= 1999 UEFA European Under-16 Championship squads =

Football tournament squads

Below are the rosters for the 1999 UEFA European Under-16 Football Championship tournament in the Czech Republic.

== Group A ==
=== Finland ===
Head coach:

=== Israel ===
Head coach: (Israel) Avraham Bakhar

No.	Pos.	Player	Date of birth (age)	Club
1	GK	Galil Ben Shanan	27 June 1982 (aged 16)	(Israel Football Association) Hapoel Ramat Gan
2	DF	Shlomi Oukashi	1 January 1982 (aged 17)	(Israel Football Association) Maccabi Netanya
3	DF	Hay Ben Lulu	28 June 1982 (aged 16)	(Israel Football Association) Hapoel Haifa
4	DF	Rahamim Halis	21 June 1982 (aged 16)	(Israel Football Association) Hapoel Tel Aviv
5	DF	Yossi Nagar	22 August 1982 (aged 16)	(Israel Football Association) Maccabi Haifa
6	DF	Hen Kessler	1 February 1982 (aged 17)	Unknown
7	MF	Ohad Tsur	5 May 1982 (aged 16)	(Israel Football Association) Hapoel Kfar Saba
8	MF	Roei Hazan	19 January 1982 (aged 17)	(Israel Football Association) Hapoel Tel Aviv
9	FW	Kfir Chokol	31 July 1982 (aged 16)	(Israel Football Association) Maccabi Netanya
10	MF	Reuven Oved	28 November 1983 (aged 15)	(Israel Football Association) Maccabi Tel Aviv
11	FW	Eli Bitton	25 January 1982 (aged 17)	(Israel Football Association) Maccabi Tel Aviv
12	MF	Adi Peretz	1 January 1982 (aged 17)	Unknown
14	MF	Daniel Heidman	10 November 1982 (aged 16)	(Israel Football Association) Maccabi Tel Aviv
15	DF	Ze'ev Haimovich	7 April 1983 (aged 16)	(Israel Football Association) Beitar Tubruk
16	MF	Yossi Shivhon	22 March 1982 (aged 17)	(Israel Football Association) Hapoel Petah Tikva
17	DF	Samuel Lavan	21 January 1982 (aged 17)	(Royal Belgian Football Association) Lierse S.K.
18	GK	Alon Cohen	1 February 1982 (aged 17)	Unknown

=== Portugal ===
Head coach:

=== Switzerland ===
Head coach:

== Group B ==
=== England ===
Head coach: (England) Dick Bate

No.	Pos.	Player	Date of birth (age)	Caps	Goals	Club
1	GK	Rhys Evans	27 January 1982 (aged 17)			(The Football Association) Chelsea
2	DF	Frazer Richardson	19 October 1982 (aged 16)			(The Football Association) Leeds United
3	DF	Neil Jenkins	6 January 1982 (aged 17)			(The Football Association) Wimbledon
4	DF	Matthew Davies	2 January 1982 (aged 17)			(The Football Association) Southampton
5	DF	Peter Clarke	3 January 1982 (aged 17)			(The Football Association) Everton
6	DF	Stuart Parnaby	19 July 1982 (aged 16)			(The Football Association) Middlesbrough
7	MF	Chris O'Brien	13 January 1982 (aged 17)			(The Football Association) Liverpool
8	MF	Jamie McMaster	19 January 1982 (aged 17)			(The Football Association) Leeds United
9	FW	Rory Fallon	20 March 1982 (aged 17)			(The Football Association) Barnsley
10	FW	Leon Knight	16 September 1982 (aged 16)			(The Football Association) Chelsea
11	FW	Jimmy Davis	6 February 1982 (aged 17)			(The Football Association) Manchester United
12	MF	Matt Hamshaw	1 January 1982 (aged 17)			(The Football Association) Sheffield Wednesday
13	GK	Russell Howarth	27 March 1982 (aged 17)			(The Football Association) York City
14	MF	Marek Szmid	2 March 1982 (aged 17)			(The Football Association) Manchester United
15	FW	Craig Farrell	5 December 1982 (aged 16)			(The Football Association) Leeds United
16	MF	Jon Bewers	10 September 1982 (aged 16)			(The Football Association) Aston Villa
17	MF	Leon Britton	19 June 1982 (aged 16)			(The Football Association) Arsenal
18	FW	Jay Bothroyd	7 May 1982 (aged 16)			(The Football Association) Arsenal

=== Hungary ===
Head coach: (Hungary) Mihály Ubrankovics

No.	Pos.	Player	Date of birth (age)	Caps	Goals	Club
1	GK	Levente Szántai	15 November 1982 (aged 16)			(Hungarian Football Federation) Újpest FC
2	MF	Krisztián Nánási	21 June 1982 (aged 16)			(Hungarian Football Federation) Kispest Honvéd FC
3	DF	Zsolt Vass	30 January 1982 (aged 17)			(Hungarian Football Federation) Vasas SC
4	DF	Boldizsár Bodor	27 April 1982 (aged 16)			(Hungarian Football Federation) Pécsi MFC
5	DF	Gábor Oszlánszki	2 January 1982 (aged 17)			(Hungarian Football Federation) Kispest Honvéd FC
6	MF	Norbert Hajdú	1 October 1982 (aged 16)			(Hungarian Football Federation) Vác FC
7	MF	Levente Horváth	13 April 1982 (aged 17)			(Hungarian Football Federation) MTK Budapest FC
8	MF	Krisztián Szokoli	8 February 1982 (aged 17)			(Hungarian Football Federation) Vasas SC
9	FW	Ákos Buzsáky	7 May 1982 (aged 16)			(Hungarian Football Federation) MTK Budapest FC
10	MF	Péter Czvitkovics	10 February 1983 (aged 16)			(Hungarian Football Federation) MTK Budapest FC
11	FW	Kristóf Bánka	8 January 1982 (aged 17)			(Hungarian Football Federation) MTK Budapest FC
12	GK	János Balogh	29 November 1982 (aged 16)			(Hungarian Football Federation) Debreceni VSC
13	DF	Csaba Regedei	16 January 1983 (aged 16)			(Hungarian Football Federation) Győri ETO FC
14	DF	Attila Blaogh	7 March 1982 (aged 17)			(Hungarian Football Federation) MTK Budapest FC
15	MF	Milán Disztl	27 June 1982 (aged 16)			(Hungarian Football Federation) Videoton FC
16	DF	Roland Juhász	1 July 1983 (aged 15)			(Hungarian Football Federation) MTK Budapest FC
17	MF	Szabolcs Kanta	29 January 1982 (aged 17)			(Hungarian Football Federation) MTK Budapest FC
18	FW	Zsolt Szabó	8 January 1982 (aged 17)			(Hungarian Football Federation) MTK Budapest FC

=== Slovakia ===
Head coach: (Slovakia) Anton Valovič

No.	Pos.	Player	Date of birth (age)	Caps	Goals	Club
1	GK	Péter Molnár	15 May 1982 (aged 16)			(Slovak Football Association) FK Slovan Levice
2	DF	Gabriel Pavlulík	5 January 1982 (aged 17)			(Slovak Football Association) MFK Košice
3	DF	Vladimír Pončák	19 June 1982 (aged 16)			(Slovak Football Association) Tatran Prešov
4	DF	Karol Kovalík	31 January 1982 (aged 17)			(Slovak Football Association) Tatran Prešov
5	DF	František Kaprálik	16 March 1982 (aged 17)			(Slovak Football Association) MFK Ružomberok
6	MF	Braníslav Ambrózy	9 January 1982 (aged 17)			(Slovak Football Association) Tatran Prešov
7	MF	Stanislav Angelovič	26 March 1982 (aged 17)			(Slovak Football Association) Tatran Prešov
8	MF	Igor Držík	10 April 1982 (aged 17)			(Slovak Football Association) MFK Dubnica
9	FW	Marek Helcz	27 October 1982 (aged 16)			(Slovak Football Association) FK Baník Prievidza
10	FW	Branislav Jašurek	21 March 1982 (aged 17)			(Slovak Football Association) MŠK Žilina
11	FW	Ladislav Vencel	17 July 1982 (aged 16)			(Slovak Football Association) FC Nitra
12	MF	Rudolf Novák	11 January 1982 (aged 17)			(Slovak Football Association) MŠK Žilina
13	MF	Peter Mazúch	2 October 1982 (aged 16)			(Slovak Football Association) FK Dukla Banská Bystrica
14	DF	Richard Szabo	24 September 1983 (aged 15)			(Slovak Football Association) ŠK Slovan Bratislava
15	MF	Tomáš Sloboda	15 May 1982 (aged 16)			(Slovak Football Association) ŠK Slovan Bratislava
16	FW	Tomáš Šimček	11 April 1982 (aged 17)			(Slovak Football Association) MŠK Žilina
17	DF	Peter Rybár	25 August 1982 (aged 16)			(Slovak Football Association) MFK Košice
18	GK	Ján Mucha	5 December 1982 (aged 16)			(Slovak Football Association) FK Inter Bratislava

=== Sweden ===
Head coach: (Sweden) Hans Lindbom

No.	Pos.	Player	Date of birth (age)	Caps	Goals	Club
1	GK	John Alvbåge	10 August 1982 (aged 16)			(Swedish Football Association) Torslanda IK
2	DF	John Claesson	19 March 1982 (aged 17)			(Swedish Football Association) Halmstads BK
3	DF	John Erlandsson	2 May 1982 (aged 16)			(Swedish Football Association) Motala AIF
4	DF	Richard Henriksson	5 October 1982 (aged 16)			(Swedish Football Association) Djurgårdens IF
5	DF	Per Nilsson	15 September 1982 (aged 16)			(Swedish Football Association) GIF Sundsvall
6	DF	Saleh Saadoo	10 August 1982 (aged 16)			(Swedish Football Association) IK Sirius
7	DF	Gabriel Ucar	12 March 1982 (aged 17)			(Swedish Football Association) Landskrona BoIS
8	MF	Stefan Ishizaki	15 May 1982 (aged 16)			(Swedish Football Association) AIK
9	MF	Kim Källström	24 August 1982 (aged 16)			(Swedish Football Association) BK Häcken
10	MF	Dime Kuzev	7 January 1982 (aged 17)			(Swedish Football Association) Örgryte IS
11	MF	Daniel Nilsson	21 September 1982 (aged 16)			(Swedish Football Association) Helsingborgs IF
12	GK	Charlie Fält	4 June 1982 (aged 16)			(Swedish Football Association) Halmstads BK
13	MF	Jens Sloth	9 September 1982 (aged 16)			(Swedish Football Association) Trelleborgs FF
14	FW	Bojan Djordjic	6 February 1982 (aged 17)			(Swedish Football Association) IF Brommapojkarna
15	FW	David Eek	24 August 1982 (aged 16)			(Swedish Football Association) IFK Hässleholm
16	FW	Jon Lundblad	16 February 1982 (aged 17)			(Swedish Football Association) Örebro SK
17	FW	John Pelu	2 February 1982 (aged 17)			(Swedish Football Association) Helsingborgs IF
18	FW	Andreas Skogdalen	19 April 1982 (aged 17)			(Swedish Football Association) Västra Frölunda IF

== Group C ==
=== Croatia ===
Head coach: Martin Novoselac

No.	Pos.	Player	Date of birth (age)	Caps	Goals	Club
1	GK	Marko Šarlija	31 January 1982 (aged 17)			
2	FW	Siniša Linić	23 August 1982 (aged 16)			
3	DF	Zlatko Blaškić	27 April 1982 (aged 16)			
4	MF	Darijo Srna	1 May 1982 (aged 16)			
5	DF	Miodrag Gak	8 September 1982 (aged 16)			
6	MF	Mario Carević	29 March 1982 (aged 17)			
7	DF	Igor Čagalj	8 October 1982 (aged 16)			
8	FW	Marko Gavranović	11 October 1982 (aged 16)			
9	FW	Dario Zahora (c)	21 March 1982 (aged 17)			
10	DF	Tomislav Mikulić	4 January 1982 (aged 17)			
11	MF	Vladimir Lalić	5 February 1982 (aged 17)			
12	GK	Sead Delkić	26 September 1983 (aged 15)			
13	DF	Vladimir Maljković	14 August 1982 (aged 16)			
14	FW	Damir Klinčić	12 March 1982 (aged 17)			
15	FW	Dino Kresinger	20 March 1982 (aged 17)			
16	MF	Ninoslav Parmaković	24 November 1982 (aged 16)			
17	FW	Igor Koretić	22 January 1982 (aged 17)			
18	MF	Alen Maras	27 February 1982 (aged 17)			

=== Poland ===
Head coach: Michał Globisz

No.	Pos.	Player	Date of birth (age)	Caps	Goals	Club
1	GK	Paweł Kapsa	24 July 1982 (aged 16)			(Polish Football Association) KSZO Ostrowiec
2	DF	Marcin Rogalski	15 July 1982 (aged 16)			(Polish Football Association) Zawisza Bydgoszcz
3	DF	Adrian Napierała	16 February 1982 (aged 17)			(Polish Football Association) MSP Szamotuły
4	DF	Tomasz Wisio	24 July 1982 (aged 16)			(Polish Football Association) Zagłębie Lubin
5	DF	Łukasz Nawotczyński	30 March 1982 (aged 17)			(Polish Football Association) Lechia Gdańsk
6	MF	Wojciech Łobodziński	20 October 1982 (aged 16)			(Polish Football Association) Zawisza Bydgoszcz
7	MF	Dariusz Zawadzki	18 June 1982 (aged 16)			(Polish Football Association) Wisła Kraków
8	MF	Rafał Grzelak	24 June 1982 (aged 16)			(Polish Football Association) ŁKS Łódź
9	MF	Łukasz Madej	14 April 1982 (aged 17)			(Polish Football Association) ŁKS Łódź
10	MF	Paweł Hajduczek	17 May 1982 (aged 16)			(Polish Football Association) MOSiR Jastrzębie Zdrój
11	FW	Michał Janicki	29 July 1982 (aged 16)			(Polish Football Association) Wawel Kraków
12	GK	Sebastian Malicki	21 January 1982 (aged 17)			(Polish Football Association) KS Piaseczno
13	FW	Radosław Matusiak	1 January 1982 (aged 17)			(Polish Football Association) ŁKS Łódź
14	MF	Sebastian Mila	10 July 1982 (aged 16)			(Polish Football Association) Lechia Gdańsk
15	DF	Paweł Strąk	24 March 1983 (aged 16)			(Polish Football Association) Wisła Kraków
16	MF	Robert Sierant	8 July 1982 (aged 16)			(Polish Football Association) ŁKS Łódź
17	FW	Łukasz Mierzejewski	31 August 1982 (aged 16)			(Polish Football Association) Lechia Gdańsk
18	DF	Krzysztof Łągiewka	23 January 1983 (aged 16)			(Polish Football Association) Olimpia Zambrów

=== Russia ===
Head coach: Aleksandr Grebnev

No.	Pos.	Player	Date of birth (age)	Caps	Goals	Club
1	GK	Sergei Kotov	17 March 1982 (aged 17)			(Russian Football Union) Spartak Moscow
2	DF	Fyodor Usov	30 March 1982 (aged 17)			(Russian Football Union) Zenit Saint Petersburg
3	DF	Vasili Berezutski	20 June 1982 (aged 16)			(Russian Football Union) Torpedo-ZIL
4	MF	Andrei Ryabykh	16 May 1982 (aged 16)			(Russian Football Union) Olimpia Volgograd
5	DF	Ivan Sablya	15 November 1982 (aged 16)			(Russian Football Union) Dynamo Stavropol
6	DF	Vasili Chernov	26 May 1982 (aged 16)			(Russian Football Union) Olimpia Volgograd
7	DF	Aleksei Berezutski	20 June 1982 (aged 16)			(Russian Football Union) Torpedo-ZIL
8	FW	Aleksei Zhdanov	28 March 1982 (aged 17)			(Russian Football Union) Olimpia Volgograd
9	MF	Dmitri Kudryashov	13 May 1983 (aged 15)			(French Football Federation) Saint-Étienne
10	MF	Valerian Bestayev	5 March 1982 (aged 17)			(Russian Football Union) Avtodor Vladikavkaz
11	MF	Amzor Ailarov	29 January 1982 (aged 17)			(Russian Football Union) Avtodor Vladikavkaz
12	GK	Denis Vavilin	4 July 1982 (aged 16)			(Russian Football Union) Krylia Sovetov Samara
13	MF	Alan Zaseyev	16 March 1982 (aged 17)			(Russian Football Union) Avtodor Vladikavkaz
14	DF	Eduard Gabeyev	25 April 1982 (aged 16)			(Russian Football Union) Avtodor Vladikavkaz
15	FW	Ivan Danshin	20 April 1982 (aged 17)			(Russian Football Union) CSKA Moscow
16	FW	Gadzhi Bamatov	16 February 1982 (aged 17)			(Russian Football Union) Anzhi Makhachkala

=== Spain ===
Head coach: Juan Santisteban

No.	Pos.	Player	Date of birth (age)	Caps	Goals	Club
1	GK	Pepe Reina	31 August 1982 (aged 16)			(Royal Spanish Football Federation) Barcelona
2	DF	Juan Carlos Duque	26 January 1982 (aged 17)			(Royal Spanish Football Federation) Real Madrid
3	DF	Enrique Corrales	1 March 1982 (aged 17)			(Royal Spanish Football Federation) Real Madrid
4	MF	Mikel Arteta	26 March 1982 (aged 17)			(Royal Spanish Football Federation) Barcelona
5	DF	Mario	2 February 1982 (aged 17)			(Royal Spanish Football Federation) Atlético Madrid
6	DF	Rubén González	19 January 1982 (aged 17)			(Royal Spanish Football Federation) Real Madrid
7	FW	Nano	20 April 1982 (aged 17)			(Royal Spanish Football Federation) Barcelona
8	MF	Líbero Parri	18 January 1982 (aged 17)			(Royal Spanish Football Federation) Valencia
9	MF	Elías Molina	16 February 1983 (aged 16)			(Royal Spanish Football Federation) Atlético Madrid
10	FW	Ernesto	5 March 1982 (aged 17)			(Royal Spanish Football Federation) Real Madrid
11	MF	Albert Crusat	13 May 1982 (aged 16)			(Royal Spanish Football Federation) Espanyol
12	DF	Diego Alegre	22 March 1982 (aged 17)			(Royal Spanish Football Federation) Valencia
13	GK	David Relaño	22 April 1982 (aged 17)			(Royal Spanish Football Federation) Real Betis
14	FW	Jonathan Aspas	28 February 1982 (aged 17)			(Royal Spanish Football Federation) Celta Vigo
15	FW	Aitor	20 April 1982 (aged 17)			(Royal Spanish Football Federation) Barcelona
16	FW	Jorge Perona	1 April 1982 (aged 17)			(Royal Spanish Football Federation) Valencia
17	MF	Jon Sancet	11 January 1982 (aged 17)			(Royal Spanish Football Federation) Osasuna
18	DF	Berna	12 February 1982 (aged 17)			(Royal Spanish Football Federation) Real Madrid

== Group D ==
=== Czech Republic ===
Head coach: (Czech Republic) Štěpán Oldřich

No.	Pos.	Player	Date of birth (age)	Caps	Goals	Club
1	GK	Petr Čech	20 May 1982 (aged 16)			(Football Association of the Czech Republic) Škoda Plzeň
2	DF	Aleš Hujík	23 March 1982 (aged 17)			(Football Association of the Czech Republic) Baník Ostrava
3	DF	Pavel Besta	2 September 1982 (aged 16)			(Football Association of the Czech Republic) Baník Ostrava
4	DF	Michal Šimeček	27 July 1982 (aged 16)			(Football Association of the Czech Republic) SK Dynamo České Budějovice
5	DF	David Bystroň	18 November 1982 (aged 16)			(Football Association of the Czech Republic) Baník Ostrava
6	MF	Petr Čoupek	10 May 1982 (aged 16)			(Football Association of the Czech Republic) FC Brno
7	FW	Aleš Majer	27 May 1982 (aged 16)			(Football Association of the Czech Republic) Sparta Prague
8	MF	Jaroslav Plašil	5 January 1982 (aged 17)			(Football Association of the Czech Republic) FC Hradec Králové
9	MF	Marek Ctiburek	18 February 1982 (aged 17)			(Football Association of the Czech Republic) FC Vítkovice
10	FW	Ondřej Holeček	16 March 1982 (aged 17)			(Football Association of the Czech Republic) FC Slovan Liberec
11	MF	Filip Trojan	21 February 1983 (aged 16)			(Football Association of the Czech Republic) SK Slavia Prague
12	MF	Ondřej Švejdík	3 December 1982 (aged 16)			(Football Association of the Czech Republic) Kaučuk Opava
13	DF	Dušan Lizák	18 March 1982 (aged 17)			(Football Association of the Czech Republic) SK Benešov
14	FW	Martin Vyskočil	15 September 1982 (aged 16)			(Football Association of the Czech Republic) SK Sigma Olomouc
15	DF	Marek Liolias	9 November 1982 (aged 16)			(Football Association of the Czech Republic) Baník Ostrava
16	GK	Jan Laštůvka	7 July 1982 (aged 16)			(Football Association of the Czech Republic) MFK Karviná
17	FW	Tomáš Jun	17 January 1983 (aged 16)			(Football Association of the Czech Republic) Sparta Prague
18	MF	Josef Laštovka	20 February 1982 (aged 17)			(Football Association of the Czech Republic) SK Benešov

=== Denmark ===
Head coach: (Denmark) Hans Brun Larsen

No.	Pos.	Player	Date of birth (age)	Caps	Goals	Club
1	GK	Lasse Sørensen	6 March 1982 (aged 17)			(Danish Football Association) Boldklubben Frem
2	DF	Martin Jensen	11 May 1983 (aged 15)			(Danish Football Association) Boldklubben Frem
3	GK	Jeppe Eriksen	4 March 1983 (aged 16)			(Danish Football Association) Odense BK
4	DF	Christian Traoré	18 April 1982 (aged 17)			(Danish Football Association) F.C. Copenhagen
5	MF	Brian Friis	21 February 1982 (aged 17)			(Danish Football Association) AGF Aarhus
6	DF	Casper Kruse	12 February 1982 (aged 17)			(Danish Football Association) Odense BK
7	MF	Volkan Ceran	22 January 1982 (aged 17)			(Danish Football Association) AGF Aarhus
8	MF	Claus Pedersen	18 February 1982 (aged 17)			(Danish Football Association) Odense BK
9	FW	Jonas Schmidt	16 June 1982 (aged 16)			(Danish Football Association) Odense BK
10	FW	Jacob Bymar	19 March 1982 (aged 17)			(Danish Football Association) Esbjerg fB
11	FW	Tom Christensen	31 January 1982 (aged 17)			(Danish Football Association) AGF Aarhus
12	DF	Mike Andresen	26 August 1982 (aged 16)			(Danish Football Association) AGF Aarhus
13	DF	Kasper Kure Vidkjær	20 July 1982 (aged 16)			(Danish Football Association) AGF Aarhus
14	MF	Sebastian Svärd	15 January 1983 (aged 16)			(Danish Football Association) F.C. Copenhagen
15	MF	Hans Yoo Mathiesen	18 August 1983 (aged 15)			(Danish Football Association) Brøndby IF
16	GK	Kasper Jensen	7 October 1982 (aged 16)			(Danish Football Association) AaB
17	FW	Brian Bække	5 June 1982 (aged 16)			(Danish Football Association) Brøndby IF
18	FW	Simon Azoulay Pedersen	14 December 1982 (aged 16)			(Danish Football Association) B.93

=== Germany ===
Manager: Erich Rutemöller

No.	Pos.	Player	Date of birth (age)	Caps	Goals	Club
1	GK	Jan Schlösser	27 September 1982 (aged 16)			(German Football Association) Bayern Munich II
2	DF	Andreas Hinkel	26 March 1982 (aged 17)			(German Football Association) VfB Stuttgart II
3	MF	Torsten Reuter	15 September 1982 (aged 16)			(German Football Association) 1. FC Kaiserslautern II
4	DF	Florian Thorwart	20 April 1982 (aged 17)			(German Football Association) Borussia Dortmund II
5	MF	Marco Löring	21 February 1982 (aged 17)			(German Football Association) Borussia Dortmund II
6	MF	Markus Feulner	12 February 1982 (aged 17)			(German Football Association) Bayern Munich II
7	MF	Florian Kringe	18 August 1982 (aged 16)			(German Football Association) Borussia Dortmund II
8	MF	Thomas Hitzlsperger	5 April 1982 (aged 17)			(German Football Association) Bayern Munich II
9	FW	Florian Heller	10 March 1982 (aged 17)			(German Football Association) Bayern Munich II
10	MF	Daniel Jungwirth	15 January 1982 (aged 17)			(German Football Association) Bayern Munich II
11	DF	Markus Wersching	2 January 1982 (aged 17)			(German Football Association) Borussia Dortmund II
12	GK	Dennis Eilhoff	31 July 1982 (aged 16)			(German Football Association) Arminia Bielefeld II
13	MF	Thorsten Redlich	13 August 1982 (aged 16)			(German Football Association) Energie Cottbus II
14	MF	Stefan Beckert	3 May 1982 (aged 16)			(German Football Association) Werder Bremen II
15	MF	Andreas Görlitz	8 March 1982 (aged 17)			(German Football Association) 1. FC Nürnberg II
16	MF	Thomas Wörle	11 February 1982 (aged 17)			(German Football Association) FC Augsburg II
17	FW	Andreas Haas	20 April 1982 (aged 17)			(German Football Association) 1. FC Saarbrücken II
18	FW	Jürgen Schmid	11 February 1982 (aged 17)			(German Football Association) Bayern Munich II

=== Greece ===
Head coach: (Greece) Thomas Sentelidis

No.	Pos.	Player	Date of birth (age)	Caps	Goals	Club
1	GK	Eleftherios Petkaris	5 March 1982 (aged 17)			(Italian Football Federation) Napoli
2	DF	Ilias Pastos	1 May 1982 (aged 16)			(Hellenic Football Federation) Aetos Skydra F.C.
3	DF	Anestis Anastasiadis	21 January 1983 (aged 16)			(Hellenic Football Federation) Iraklis
4	MF	Charalambos Siligardakis	17 March 1982 (aged 17)			(Hellenic Football Federation) Papagos FC
5	DF	Fotis Kiskampanis	8 January 1982 (aged 17)			(Hellenic Football Federation) Kilkisiakos F.C.
6	DF	Vasilis Alevizos	11 October 1982 (aged 16)			(Hellenic Football Federation) Kalamata F.C.
7	MF	Konstantinos Daskalakis	6 December 1982 (aged 16)			(Hellenic Football Federation) Kalamata F.C.
8	MF	Tasos Dentsas	19 March 1982 (aged 17)			(Hellenic Football Federation) Panserraikos F.C.
9	FW	Evaggelos Kapsalis	19 September 1982 (aged 16)			(Hellenic Football Federation) Meliteas F.C.
10	MF	Dimitrios Kosmas	5 June 1982 (aged 16)			(Hellenic Football Federation) AEK Athens F.C.
11	FW	Vasilis Andreadakis	5 August 1982 (aged 16)			(Hellenic Football Federation) Panathinaikos F.C.
12	FW	Christos Kalantzis	1 December 1982 (aged 16)			(Hellenic Football Federation) Kalamata F.C.
13	FW	Sokratis Chounouzidis	5 August 1982 (aged 16)			(Hellenic Football Federation) Krepeni F.C.
14	DF	Ioannis Lamprianidis	12 February 1982 (aged 17)			(Hellenic Football Federation) Panelefsiniakos F.C.
15	GK	Antonis Voulgaris	9 April 1982 (aged 17)			(Hellenic Football Federation) Anthoupoli F.C.
16	DF	Michael Fotiadis	21 January 1983 (aged 16)			(Hellenic Football Federation) Elpides Karditsas
17	DF	Dimitris Kontodimos	21 April 1982 (aged 17)			(Hellenic Football Federation) A.E Dimitra Efxeinoupolis
18	MF	Georgios Kousas	12 August 1982 (aged 16)			(Hellenic Football Federation) Aris
