= 2001 UEFA European Under-18 Championship =

2001 UEFA Under-18 Championship
Jalkapallon alle 18-vuotiaiden Euroopan-mestaruuskilpailut 2001 2001 U18-Europamästerskapet i fotboll

Tournament details
- Host country: Finland
- Dates: 21–29 July
- Teams: 8

Final positions
- Champions: Poland (1st title)
- Runners-up: Czech Republic
- Third place: Spain
- Fourth place: FR Yugoslavia

Tournament statistics
- Matches played: 14
- Goals scored: 59 (4.21 per match)
- Top scorer(s): (Spain) Jorge Perona (8 goals)

The UEFA European Under-18 Championship 2001 Final Tournament was held in Finland. Players born after 1 January 1982 were eligible to participate in this competition. This championship was the final one to use the Under-18 name; starting in 2002, the event was renamed as a UEFA European Under-19 Championship without any change in age eligibility.

== Teams ==
The following teams had qualified for the tournament:

- Belgium
- Czech Republic
- Denmark
- Finland (host)
- Poland
- Spain
- Ukraine
- FR Yugoslavia

== Venues ==
The final tournament was held in four stadiums located in four Finnish cities.

Stadium	City	Tenant club(s)	Capacity
Tehtaan kenttä	Valkeakoski	Haka	3,516
Tampere Stadium	Tampere	Tampere United	16,800
Finnair Stadium	Helsinki	HJK and HIFK	10,770
Pohjola Stadion	Vantaa	PK-35 and Allianssi	4,700

== Results ==
=== Group stage ===
==== Group A ====
Teams	Pld	W	D	L	GF	GA	GD	Pts
Czech Republic	3	3	0	0	8	3	+5	9
FR Yugoslavia	3	2	0	1	10	6	+4	6
Ukraine	3	0	1	2	4	6	-2	1
Finland	3	0	1	2	6	13	-7	1

21 June 2001

Finland	1 – 1	Ukraine
Scheweleff 84'		Karabkin 49'

Finnair Stadium, Helsinki
Referee: Helmut Fleischer (Germany)
21 June 2001

Czech Republic	1 – 0	FR Yugoslavia
Řehák 24'	Report

Finnair Stadium, Helsinki
Attendance: 869
Referee: Massimo Busacca (Switzerland)

23 June 2001

Finland	1 – 4	Czech Republic
Sjölund 6'	Report	Dujka 14'; Koubský 44'; Trojan 57'; Čoupek 58'

Finnair Stadium, Helsinki
Attendance: 6,237
Referee: Massimo De Santis (Italy)
23 June 2001

Ukraine	1 – 2	FR Yugoslavia
Pinchuk 24'	Report	Damjanović 35'; Misimović 79'

Pohjola Stadion, Vantaa
Attendance: 538
Referee: Eric Poulat (France)

25 June 2001

FR Yugoslavia	8 – 4	Finland
Damjanović 20', 49'; Cilinšek 23'; Misimović 38'; Lazović 53', 65', 68', 82'	Report	Sjölund 51', 74'; Peteri 54'; Okkonen 62'

Finnair Stadium, Helsinki
Attendance: 4,753
Referee: Attila Hanacsek (Hungary)
25 June 2001

Czech Republic	3 – 2	Ukraine
Bystroň 63'; Koubský 69'; Hudec 84'	Report	Motuz 51'; Kutas 56'

Pohjola Stadion, Vantaa
Attendance: 468
Referee: Martin Ingvarsson (Sweden)

==== Group B ====
Teams	Pld	W	D	L	GF	GA	GD	Pts
Poland	3	2	1	0	8	4	+4	7
Spain	3	2	0	1	5	5	0	6
Belgium	3	1	1	1	4	4	0	4
Denmark	3	0	0	3	2	6	-4	0

22 July 2001

Poland	4 – 1	Spain
Nawotczyński 14', 90'; Madej 16'; Grzelak 41'	Report	Perona 23'

Tehtaan kenttä, Valkeakoski
Referee: Martin Ingvarsson (Sweden)
22 July 2001

Belgium	2 – 0	Denmark
Aelbrecht 56'; Djamba-Shango 90'

Tehtaan kenttä, Valkeakoski
Referee: Attila Hanacsek (Hungary)

24 July 2001

Spain	1 – 0	Denmark
Perona 87'	Report

Tampere Stadium, Tampere
Referee: Helmut Fleischer (Germany)
24 July 2001

Poland	1 – 1	Belgium
Kaźmierczak 82'		Djamba-Shango 78'

Tampere Stadium, Tampere
Referee: Massimo Busacca (Switzerland)

26 July 2001

Denmark	2 – 3	Poland
Beierholm 5'; Benjaminsen 57'		Zawadzki 18', 28'; Żytko

Tampere Stadium, Tampere
Referee: Eric Poulat (France)
26 July 2001

Spain	3 – 1	Belgium
Perona 8', 76', 90' (pen.)	Report	Walasiak 31'

Tehtaan kenttä, Valkeakoski
Referee: Massimo De Santis (Italy)

=== Third place play-off ===
29 July 2001

FR Yugoslavia	2 – 6	Spain
Bihorac 5', 46'	Report	Arteta 2'; Perona 21', 58', 87'; Elá 43', 77'

Finnair Stadium, Helsinki
Attendance: 1,257
Referee: Massimo Busacca (Switzerland)

=== Final ===
29 July 2001

Czech Republic	1 – 3	Poland
Trojan 39'	Report	Nawotczyński 26'; Madej 89'; Łobodziński 90'

Finnair Stadium, Helsinki
Referee: Eric Poulat (France)

2001 UEFA U-18 Championship winner

Poland
First title

== Goalscorers ==
8 goals

- (Spain) Jorge Perona

4 goals

- (Federal Republic of Yugoslavia) Danko Lazović

3 goals

- (Finland) Daniel Sjölund
- (Poland) Łukasz Nawotczyński
- (Federal Republic of Yugoslavia) Jovan Damjanović

2 goals

- (Belgium) Serge Djamba-Shango
- (Czech Republic) Jiri Koubsky
- (Czech Republic) Filip Trojan
- (Poland) Łukasz Madej
- (Poland) Dariusz Zawadzki
- (Spain) Jacinto Elá
- (Federal Republic of Yugoslavia) Emir Bihorac
- (Federal Republic of Yugoslavia) Zvjezdan Misimović

1 goal

- (Belgium) Tim Aelbrecht
- (Belgium) Jonathan Walasiak
- (Czech Republic) David Bystroň
- (Czech Republic) Petr Čoupek
- (Czech Republic) Tomas Dujka
- (Czech Republic) Martin Hudec
- (Czech Republic) Tomáš Řehák
- (Denmark) Mads Beierholm
- (Denmark) Peter Benjaminsen
- (Finland) Antti Okkonen
- (Finland) Jussi Peteri
- (Finland) Henri Scheweleff
- (Spain) Mikel Arteta
- (Poland) Rafał Grzelak
- (Poland) Przemysław Kaźmierczak
- (Poland) Wojciech Łobodziński
- (Poland) Mateusz Żytko
- (Ukraine) Yaroslav Karabkin
- (Ukraine) Pavlo Kutas
- (Ukraine) Serhiy Motuz
- (Ukraine) Dmytro Pinchuk
- (Federal Republic of Yugoslavia) Saša Cilinšek

== See also ==
- 2001 UEFA European Under-18 Championship qualifying
