= Andrei Ryabykh =

Andrei Ryabykh may refer to:

- Andrei Ryabykh (footballer, born 1978), Russian football player
- Andrei Ryabykh (footballer, born 1982), Russian football player
