= 2006 UEFA European Under-21 Championship qualification Group 8 =

Football tournament qualification stage

The teams competing in Group 8 of the 2006 UEFA European Under-21 Championship qualifying competition were Sweden, Bulgaria, Hungary, Croatia, Iceland and Malta.

== Standings ==
Team	Pld	W	D	L	GF	GA	GD	Pts
Croatia	10	8	1	1	14	6	+8	25
Hungary	10	6	1	3	12	7	+5	19
Sweden	10	6	0	4	16	12	+4	18
Iceland	10	4	1	5	15	11	+4	13
Bulgaria	10	2	1	7	9	17	−8	7
Malta	10	1	2	7	3	16	−13	5

	(Bulgaria)	(Croatia)	(Hungary)	(Iceland)	(Malta)	(Sweden)
Bulgaria	—	2–1	1–2	1–3	2–1	1–2
Croatia	1–0	—	1–0	2–1	1–0	1–0
Hungary	1–0	2–2	—	1–0	2–0	0–1
Iceland	3–1	1–2	0–1	—	0–0	3–1
Malta	1–1	0–1	0–2	1–0	—	0–1
Sweden	2–0	0–2	2–1	1–4	6–0	—

== Matches ==
All times are CET.

3 September 2004
17:00

Croatia	1 – 0	Hungary
Eduardo 19'	Report

ŠRC Velika Gorica, Velika Gorica
Referee: Imankhan Sultani (Azerbaijan)
3 September 2004
18:00

Malta	0 – 1	Sweden
	Report	Farnerud 18'

Ta' Qali National Stadium, Ta' Qali
Referee: Robert Małek (Poland)
3 September 2004
19:00

Iceland	3 – 1	Bulgaria
Sigurðsson 41', 58' (pen.), 87' (pen.)	Report	Sigurðsson 83' (o.g.)

Víkingsvöllur, Reykjavík
Referee: Adrian Mccourt (Northern Ireland)

7 September 2004
16:30

Hungary	1 – 0	Iceland
Feczesin 90'	Report

Stadion Eszperantó Út, Dunaújváros
Referee: Raivo Lattik (Estonia)
7 September 2004
18:00

Sweden	0 – 2	Croatia
	Report	Grgurović 50'; Eduardo 69'

Edsborgs IP, Trollhättan
Referee: Mark Whitby (Wales)

8 October 2004
15:30

Croatia	1 – 0	Bulgaria
Eduardo 50'	Report

ŠRC Velika Gorica, Velika Gorica
Referee: Mike Dean (England)
8 October 2004
18:00

Malta	1 – 0	Iceland
Frendo 90+3'	Report

Ta' Qali National Stadium, Ta' Qali
Referee: Goran Mihaljević (Montenegro)
8 October 2004
19:45

Sweden	2 – 1	Hungary
Jonsson 11'; Runström 90+2'	Report	Vanczák 76'

Enavallens Idrottsplats, Enköping
Referee: Bülent Demirlek (Turkey)

12 October 2004
15:00

Bulgaria	2 – 1	Malta
Zakov 37'; Palankov 38'	Report	Milanov 90+4' (o.g.)

Balgarska Armiya Stadium, Sofia
Referee: Robert Krajnc (Slovenia)
12 October 2004
17:30

Iceland	3 – 1	Sweden
Sigurðsson 23' (pen.), 57', 60'	Report	Farnerud 53'

Grindavíkurvöllur, Grindavík
Referee: Joeri Van De Velde (Belgium)

16 November 2004
13:00

Malta	0 – 2	Hungary
	Report	Tellus 28' (o.g.); Tisza 38'

Gozo Stadium, Gozo
Referee: Aleh Chykun (Belarus)

25 March 2005
14:00

Bulgaria	1 – 2	Sweden
Venkov 41'	Report	Goitom 45+1', 56'

Balgarska Armiya Stadium, Sofia
Referee: Serge Gumienny (Belgium)
25 March 2005
15:00

Croatia	2 – 1	Iceland
Vukman 45+1'; Bartulović 80'	Report	Gudmundsson 41'

ŠRC Velika Gorica, Velika Gorica
Referee: Bülent Demirlek (Turkey)

29 March 2005
15:00

Hungary	1 – 0	Bulgaria
Magasföldi 53'	Report

Stadion Eszperantó Út, Dunaújváros
Referee: Bruno Miguel Duarte Paixao (Portugal)
29 March 2005
16:00

Croatia	1 – 0	Malta
Tadić 50'	Report

ŠRC Velika Gorica, Velika Gorica
Referee: Pavel Olsiak (Slovakia)

3 June 2005
17:00

Bulgaria	2 – 1	Croatia
Genkov 56'; Domovchiyski 63'	Report	Tadić 47'

Balgarska Armiya Stadium, Sofia
Referee: Heraklis Tsikinis (Greece)
3 June 2005
19:00

Sweden	6 – 0	Malta
Dahlberg 8', 56'; Farnerud 32'; Cilia 48' (o.g.); Jönsson 68', 89'	Report

Örjans Vall, Halmstad
Referee: Veaceslav Banari (Moldova)
3 June 2005
20:00

Iceland	0 – 1	Hungary
	Report	Sándor 12'

Víkingsvöllur, Reykjavík
Referee: Anthony Buttimer (Republic of Ireland)

7 June 2005
20:00

Iceland	0 – 0	Malta
	Report

KR-völlur, Reykjavík
Referee: Calum Murray (Scotland)

2 September 2005
19:00

Hungary	2 – 0	Malta
Máté 28'; Tisza 42'	Report

Stadion Rudolf Illovszky, Budapest
Referee: Albano Janku (Albania)
2 September 2005
19:00

Iceland	1 – 2	Croatia
Hallfreðsson 88' (pen.)	Report	Eduardo 32'; Modrić 53' (pen.)

KR-völlur, Reykjavík
Referee: Meir Levi (Israel)
2 September 2005
19:00

Sweden	2 – 0	Bulgaria
Stenman 50'; Olsson 75'	Report

Tunavallen, Eskilstuna
Referee: Andrejs Sipailo (Latvia)

6 September 2005
16:00

Bulgaria	1 – 3	Iceland
Rangelov 53'	Report	Pálmason 68'; Hallfreðsson 72'; Gunnlaugsson 90+4'

Slavia Stadium, Sofia
Referee: Marek Mikołajewski (Poland)
6 September 2005
19:00

Malta	0 – 1	Croatia
	Report	Bušić 1'

Ta' Qali National Stadium, Ta' Qali
Referee: Luc Wilmes (Luxembourg)
7 September 2005
16:00

Hungary	0 – 1	Sweden
	Report	Dahlberg 9'

Üllői úti stadion, Budapest
Referee: Claudio Circhetta (Switzerland)

7 October 2005
15:00

Bulgaria	1 – 2	Hungary
Olegov 3'	Report	Magasföldi 79'; Vadócz 83' (pen.)

Balgarska Armiya Stadium, Sofia
Referee: Brage Sandmoen (Norway)
7 October 2005
15:30

Croatia	1 – 0	Sweden
Eduardo 47'	Report

ŠRC Velika Gorica, Velika Gorica
Referee: Dietmar Drabek (Austria)

11 October 2005
18:30

Hungary	2 – 2	Croatia
Vaskó 42'; Tisza 63'	Report	Tadić 37'; Primorac 74'

Cukorgyári Stadion, Kaposvár
Referee: Aleksandr Gvardis (Russia)
11 October 2005
18:30

Sweden	1 – 4	Iceland
Farnerud 90+2'	Report	Sveinsson 40', 45+1'; Viðarsson 78'; Gunnlaugsson 90+5'

Tunavallen, Eskilstuna
Referee: Mark Courtney (Northern Ireland)
11 October 2005
19:00

Malta	1 – 1	Bulgaria
Schembri 19'	Report	Domovchiyski 14'

Ta' Qali National Stadium, Ta' Qali
Referee: Gabriele Rossi (San Marino)

== Goalscorers ==
6 goals

- (Iceland) Hannes Sigurðsson

5 goals

- (Croatia) Eduardo da Silva

4 goals

- (Sweden) Alexander Farnerud

3 goals

- (Croatia) Josip Tadić
- (Hungary) Tibor Tisza
- (Sweden) Mikael Dahlberg

2 goals

- (Bulgaria) Valeri Domovchiyski
- (Hungary) József Magasföldi
- (Iceland) Garðar Gunnlaugsson
- (Iceland) Emil Hallfreðsson
- (Iceland) Hördur Sveinsson
- (Sweden) Henok Goitom
- (Sweden) Jon Jönsson

1 goal

- (Bulgaria) Tsvetan Genkov
- (Bulgaria) Adrian Olegov
- (Bulgaria) Todor Palankov
- (Bulgaria) Dimitar Rangelov
- (Bulgaria) Mihail Venkov
- (Bulgaria) Gerasim Zakov
- (Croatia) Mladen Bartulović
- (Croatia) Tomislav Bušić
- (Croatia) Mario Grgurović
- (Croatia) Luka Modrić
- (Croatia) Karlo Primorac
- (Croatia) Neven Vukman
- (Hungary) Róbert Feczesin
- (Hungary) Péter Máté
- (Hungary) György Sándor
- (Hungary) Krisztián Vadócz
- (Hungary) Vilmos Vanczák
- (Hungary) Tamás Vaskó
- (Iceland) Ingvi Rafn Gudmundsson
- (Iceland) Davíð Viðarsson
- (Iceland) Pálmi Rafn Pálmason
- (Malta) Cleavon Frendo
- (Malta) André Schembri
- (Sweden) Dennis Jonsson
- (Sweden) Jonas Olsson
- (Sweden) Björn Runström
- (Sweden) Fredrik Stenman

1 own goal

- (Bulgaria) Zhivko Milanov (playing against Malta)
- (Iceland) Hannes Sigurðsson (playing against Bulgaria)
- (Malta) Trevor Cilia (playing against Sweden)
- (Malta) Shawn Tellus (playing against Hungary)
