= 2006 UEFA European Under-21 Championship qualification Group 1 =

The teams competing in Group 1 of the 2006 UEFA European Under-21 Championship qualifying competition were Czech Republic, Netherlands, Romania, Finland, Macedonia and Armenia.

== Standings ==
Team	Pld	W	D	L	GF	GA	GD	Pts
Netherlands	10	7	2	1	21	7	+14	23
Czech Republic	10	6	3	1	26	8	+18	21
Romania	10	6	1	3	17	8	+9	19
Macedonia	10	2	3	5	9	18	−9	9
Finland	10	2	1	7	7	16	−9	7
Armenia	10	1	2	7	2	25	−23	5

	(Armenia)	(Czech Republic)	(Finland)	(North Macedonia)	(Netherlands)	(Romania)
Armenia	—	0–4	0–1	0–0	1–3	0–5
Czech Republic	6–0	—	3–0	2–0	2–4	4–1
Finland	0–1	1–3	—	2–0	1–2	0–1
Macedonia	4–0	2–2	1–1	—	0–2	1–0
Netherlands	0–0	0–0	4–1	4–0	—	2–0
Romania	2–0	0–0	1–0	5–1	2–0	—

== Matches ==
All times are CET.

17 August 2004
19:00

Romania	1 – 0	Finland
Vasilache 58'	Report

Stadionul Cotroceni, Bucharest
Referee: Kuddusi Müftüoglu (Turkey)
18 August 2004
16:30

Macedonia	4 – 0	Armenia
Stojkov 29', 31', 88' (pen.); Todorčev 47'	Report

Boris Trajkovski Stadium, Skopje
Referee: Pieter Vink (Netherlands)

3 September 2004
16:30

Romania	5 – 1	Macedonia
Burdujan 16'; Mitea 20', 47', 58'; Cociş 74'	Report	Grozdanoski 23'

Stadionul Parc, Caracal
Referee: Stanislav Sukhina (Russia)

7 September 2004
20:00

Netherlands	0 – 0	Czech Republic
	Report

Abe Lenstra Stadion, Heerenveen
Referee: Rob Styles (England)
8 September 2004
13:00

Armenia	0 – 1	Finland
	Report	Kuqi 52'

Nairi Stadium, Yerevan
Referee: Janos Megyebiro (Hungary)

8 October 2004
16:40

Czech Republic	4 – 1	Romania
Jun 14', 51', 67'; Kadlec 46'	Report	Mitea 79'

Městský stadion, Mladá Boleslav
Referee: Daniel Stålhammar (Sweden)
9 October 2004
12:00

Finland	0 – 1	Armenia
	Report	Melkonyan 77'

Pori Stadium, Pori
Referee: Hristo Ristoskov (Bulgaria)
9 October 2004
14:30

Macedonia	0 – 2	Netherlands
	Report	John 22', 53'

Boris Trajkovski Stadium, Skopje
Referee: Darius Miezelis (Lithuania)

12 October 2004
19:30

Netherlands	4 – 1	Finland
John 27'; El Hamdaoui 31'; Huntelaar 86' van Persie 89' (pen.)	Report	Kuqi 53'

De Vijverberg, Doetinchem
Referee: Christoforos Zografos (Greece)
13 October 2004
12:00

Armenia	0 – 4	Czech Republic
	Report	Sivok 2', 55'; Trojan 70', 79'

Nairi Stadium, Yerevan
Referee: Igor Egorov (Russia)

16 November 2004
12:00

Armenia	0 – 5	Romania
	Report	Cociş 5'; Tamaş 15'; Mitea 43', 80'; Moţi 48'

Nairi Stadium, Yerevan
Referee: Sergiy Berezka (Ukraine)
17 November 2004
13:00

Macedonia	2 – 2	Czech Republic
Stojanovski 34'; Grozdanoski 79'	Report	Besta 73'; Magera 90+5'

Boris Trajkovski Stadium, Skopje
Referee: Michael Svendsen (Denmark)

25 March 2005
14:00

Romania	2 – 0	Netherlands
Prepeliţă 21' (pen.); Curelea 81'	Report

Stadionul Tineretului, Urziceni
Referee: Bruno Coué (France)
25 March 2005
16:40

Czech Republic	3 – 0	Finland
Magera 20'; Halsti 53' (o.g.); Svěrkoš 87'	Report

Městský stadion, Mladá Boleslav
Referee: Bernhard Brugger (Austria)

29 March 2005
19:30

Netherlands	0 – 0	Armenia
	Report

Willem II Stadion, Tilburg
Referee: Sergey Shmolik (Belarus)
30 March 2005
16:00

Macedonia	1 – 0	Romania
Gligorov 67'	Report

Boris Trajkovski Stadium, Skopje
Referee: Anthony Zammit (Malta)

3 June 2005
19:30

Netherlands	2 – 0	Romania
Hofs 87'; Huntelaar 90+4'	Report

Stadion Woudestein, Rotterdam
Referee: Igor Ishchenko (Ukraine)
4 June 2005
12:00

Armenia	0 – 0	Macedonia
	Report

Hrazdan Stadium, Yerevan
Referee: Akmalkhan Kholmatov (Kazakhstan)

7 June 2005
17:00

Czech Republic	2 – 0	Macedonia
Svěrkoš 50' (pen.); Papadopulos 52'	Report

Městský stadion, Mladá Boleslav
Referee: Sergiy Berezka (Ukraine)
7 June 2005
17:30

Finland	1 – 2	Netherlands
Lehtonen 50'	Report	Huntelaar 32', 90'

Tampere Stadium, Tampere
Referee: Mark Courtney (Northern Ireland)
8 June 2005
16:00

Romania	2 – 0	Armenia
Cociş 49'; Curelea 78'	Report

Stadionul Petromidia, Năvodari
Referee: Panayiotis Kailis (Cyprus)

16 August 2005
17:00

Macedonia	1 – 1	Finland
Ilijoski 82'	Report	Mäkelä 44'

Stadion Mladost, Strumica
Referee: Pavel Saliy (Kazakhstan)

3 September 2005
13:00

Armenia	1 – 3	Netherlands
Gharabaghtsyan 5'	Report	Huntelaar 28', 34' (pen.); Owusu-Abeyie 76'

Hrazdan Stadium, Yerevan
Referee: Michael Svendsen (Denmark)
3 September 2005
16:00

Romania	0 – 0	Czech Republic
	Report

Stadionul Petromidia, Năvodari
Referee: David Malcolm (Northern Ireland)

6 September 2005
18:00

Finland	2 – 0	Macedonia
Lehtonen 86'; Scheweleff 88'	Report

Veritas Stadion, Turku
Referee: Valery Vyalichka (Belarus)
7 September 2005
16:00

Czech Republic	6 – 0	Armenia
Papadopulos 17', 59'; Bednář 60'; Limberský 64'; Jirsák 77', 90+1'	Report

Městský fotbalový stadion, Uherské Hradiště
Referee: Robert Krajnc (Slovenia)

7 October 2005
16:40

Czech Republic	2 – 4	Netherlands
Svěrkoš 8' (pen.); Rilke 45+1'	Report	Castelen 61'; Jenner 62'; Luirink 74'; Huntelaar 90+1'

Městský stadion, Mladá Boleslav
Referee: Bernardino González Vázquez (Spain)
7 October 2005
18:00

Finland	0 – 1	Romania
	Report	Nicoliţă 2'

Tehtaan kenttä, Valkeakoski
Referee: Ferenc Bede (Hungary)

11 October 2005
17:00

Finland	1 – 3	Czech Republic
Mäkelä 65' (pen.)	Report	Knakal 37'; Svěrkoš 51'; Pudil 82'

ISS Stadion, Vantaa
Referee: Sten Kaldma (Estonia)
11 October 2005
19:30

Netherlands	4 – 0	Macedonia
Castelen 23', 73', 90+3'; Huntelaar 65'	Report

Mandemakers Stadion, Waalwijk
Referee: Anthony Zammit (Malta)

== Goalscorers ==
8 goals

- (Netherlands) Klaas-Jan Huntelaar

6 goals

- (Romania) Nicolae Mitea

4 goals

- (Czech Republic) Václav Svěrkoš
- (Netherlands) Romeo Castelen

3 goals

- (Czech Republic) Tomáš Jun
- (Czech Republic) Michal Papadopulos
- (North Macedonia) Aco Stojkov
- (Netherlands) Collins John
- (Romania) Răzvan Cociş

2 goals

- (Czech Republic) Tomáš Jirsák
- (Czech Republic) Lukáš Magera
- (Czech Republic) Tomáš Sivok
- (Czech Republic) Filip Trojan
- (Finland) Ville Lehtonen
- (Finland) Njazi Kuqi
- (Finland) Juho Mäkelä
- (North Macedonia) Vlatko Grozdanoski
- (Romania) Costin Curelea
- (Sweden) Jon Jönsson

1 goal

- (Armenia) Tigran Gharabaghtsyan
- (Armenia) Samvel Melkonyan
- (Czech Republic) Roman Bednář
- (Czech Republic) Aleš Besta
- (Czech Republic) Michal Kadlec
- (Czech Republic) Martin Knakal
- (Czech Republic) David Limberský
- (Czech Republic) Daniel Pudil
- (Czech Republic) Emil Rilke
- (Finland) Henri Scheweleff
- (North Macedonia) Nikola Gligorov
- (North Macedonia) Baže Ilijoski
- (North Macedonia) Aleksandar Stojanovski
- (North Macedonia) Goran Todorčev
- (Netherlands) Mounir El Hamdaoui
- (Netherlands) Nicky Hofs
- (Netherlands) Julian Jenner
- (Netherlands) Gijs Luirink
- (Netherlands) Quincy Owusu-Abeyie
- (Netherlands) Robin van Persie
- (Romania) Lucian Burdujan
- (Romania) Cosmin Moţi
- (Romania) Bănel Nicoliţă
- (Romania) Andrei Prepeliţă
- (Romania) Gabriel Tamaş
- (Romania) Ciprian Vasilache

1 own goal

- (Finland) Markus Halsti (playing against Czech Republic)
