= Martin Hudec =

Martin Hudec may refer to:

- Martin Hudec (footballer)
- Martin Hudec (rally driver)
