= Zaseyev =

Zaseyev is a surname. Notable people with the surname include:

- Alan Zaseyev (born 1982), Russian footballer
- Alen Zaseyev (born 1988), South Ossetia-born Ukrainian wrestler
- Azamat Zaseyev (born 1988), Russian footballer
- Gela Zaseyev (born 1993), Russian footballer
