= Usov =

Usov is a Russian male surname, its feminine counterpart is Usova. It is derived from Russian: ус, romanized: us, lit. 'mustache'. It may refer to

- Aleksandr Usov (athlete) (born 1976), Russian sprinter
- Alexandre Usov (born 1977), Belarusian racing cyclist
- Anton Usov (born 1994), Russian association football player
- Fyodor Usov (born 1982), Russian association football player
- Ivan Usov (born 1977), Russian swimmer
- Mikhail Usov (1883–1939), Russian geologist
- Roman Usov (born 1978), Russian Olympic runner
- Sergey Usov (born 1964), Olympic runner from Uzbekistan
- Anastasiya Usova (born 1988), Kazakhstani singer
- Maya Usova (born 1964), Russian ice dancer
- Tatiana Usova (born 1987), Russian fashion model
- Kostiantyn Usov (born 1988), Ukrainian MP

== See also ==
- Úsov, a town in Czech Republic
