= Knakal =

Knakal is a surname. Notable people with the surname include:

- Martin Knakal (born 1984), Czech footballer
- Petr Knakal (born 1983), Czech footballer
