= Mateusz Żytko =

Polish footballer (born 1982)

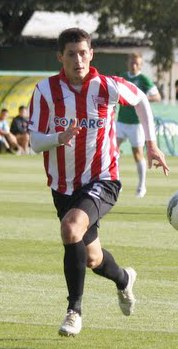
- Żytko with Cracovia in 2012

Personal information
- Full name: Mateusz Żytko
- Date of birth: 27 November 1982 (age 43)
- Place of birth: Wrocław, Poland
- Height: 1.87 m (6 ft 1 1/2 in)
- Position: Centre-back

Team information
- Current team: Piast Żmigród
- Number: 28

Senior career*
Years	Team	Apps	(Gls)
1999–2003	Śląsk Wrocław	47	(0)
2003–2007	Zagłębie Lubin	47	(0)
2006	→ Polonia Warsaw (loan)	11	(0)
2007–2010	Wisła Płock	84	(8)
2010–2011	Polonia Bytom	28	(2)
2011–2015	Cracovia	106	(4)
2015–2018	Pogoń Siedlce	90	(10)
2018–2021	KKS 1925 Kalisz	47	(4)
2021–	Piast Żmigród	101	(6)

International career
- Poland U18
	Poland U21	5	(0)

Managerial career
- 2021–: Piast Żmigród (assistant)
- 2021: Piast Żmigród (caretaker)
- 2022: Piast Żmigród (caretaker)
Medal record
Men's football
Representing Poland
UEFA European Under-18 Championship
Winner	2001 Finland
- * Club domestic league appearances and goals as of 15:41, 11 July 2025 (UTC)

Mateusz Żytko (born 27 November 1982) is a Polish professional footballer who plays as a centre-back for IV liga club Piast Żmigród, where he also serves as an assistant manager.

== Career ==
In July 2010, Żytko joined Polonia Bytom on a two-year contract deal.

In July 2011, he signed a two-year contract with Cracovia.

== Honours ==
Zagłębie Lubin

- Ekstraklasa: 2006–07

KKS 1925 Kalisz

- III liga, group II: 2019–20
- Polish Cup (Greater Poland regionals): 2019–20
- Polish Cup (Kalisz regionals): 2018–19

Piast Żmigród

- Polish Cup (Wrocław regionals): 2022–23

Poland U18

- UEFA European Under-18 Championship: 2001
