= 2006 UEFA European Under-21 Championship qualification Group 5 =

Football tournament qualification stage

The teams competing in Group 5 of the 2006 UEFA European Under-21 Championship qualifying competition were Italy, Scotland, Slovenia, Norway, Belarus and Moldova.

== Standings ==
Team	Pld	W	D	L	GF	GA	GD	Pts
Italy	10	8	1	1	16	3	+13	25
Slovenia	10	4	3	3	13	13	0	15
Norway	10	4	2	4	14	13	+1	14
Belarus	10	4	1	5	20	19	+1	13
Moldova	10	3	2	5	8	22	−14	11
Scotland	10	1	3	6	6	17	−11	6

	(Belarus)	(Italy)	(Moldova)	(Norway)	(Scotland)	(Slovenia)
Belarus	—	1–1	2–3	2–3	3–2	1–2
Italy	2–1	—	1–0	1–0	2–0	1–0
Moldova	1–0	0–1	—	1–3	0–0	1–3
Norway	2–3	1–0	1–2	—	0–1	0–0
Scotland	2–3	0–3	0–0	0–2	—	1–1
Slovenia	1–4	0–3	1–0	2–2	3–0	—

== Matches ==
All times are CET.

3 September 2004
21:00

Italy	2 – 0	Norway
Aquilani 19'; Pazzini 38'	Report

Stadio Provinciale, Trapani
Attendance: 6,000
Referee: Dejan Stanišić (Serbia and Montenegro)
4 September 2004
16:00

Slovenia	1 – 0	Moldova
Semler 60'	Report

Ob Jezeru City Stadium, Velenje
Attendance: 400
Referee: Valery Vyalichka (Belarus)

7 September 2004
19:00

Norway	2 – 3	Belarus
Eriksen 26'; Markegård 80'	Report	Shkabara 78'; Afanasyev 82', 85'

Marienlyst Stadion, Drammen
Attendance: 1,077
Referee: Richard Havrilla (Slovakia)
7 September 2004
21:00

Moldova	0 – 1	Italy
	Report	Floro Flores 90'

Stadionul Republican, Chișinău
Attendance: 1,500
Referee: Meir Levi (Israel)
7 September 2004
21:00

Scotland	1 – 1	Slovenia
O'Connor 11'	Report	Semler 14'

McDiarmid Park, Perth
Attendance: 4,000
Referee: Egill Már Markússon (Iceland)

8 October 2004
14:00

Belarus	2 – 3	Moldova
Kornilenko 32'; V.Hleb 44'	Report	Doroș 27' (pen.), 59'; Hromțov 71'

City Stadium, Borisov
Attendance: 2,500
Referee: Pavel Saliy (Kazakhstan)
8 October 2004
20:30

Scotland	0 – 2	Norway
	Report	Grindheim 42'; Eriksen 75'

Broadwood Stadium, Cumbernauld
Attendance: 3,014
Referee: Jari Maisonlahti (Finland)
8 October 2004
21:00

Slovenia	0 – 3	Italy
	Report	Bianchi 61', 77'; Chiellini 67'

Nova Gorica Sports Park, Nova Gorica
Attendance: 2,500
Referee: Athanassios Briakos (Greece)

12 October 2004
13:00

Moldova	0 – 0	Scotland
	Report

Stadionul Republican, Chișinău
Attendance: 3,000
Referee: Sašo Lazarevski (Macedonia)
12 October 2004
19:00

Norway	0 – 0	Slovenia
	Report

Åråsen Stadion, Lillestrøm
Attendance: 448
Referee: Milan Šedivý (Czech Republic)
12 October 2004
21:00

Italy	2 – 1	Belarus
Bianchi 47'; Aquilani 74'	Report	Skvernyuk 32'

Stadio Danilo Martelli, Mantova
Attendance: 3,500
Referee: Albano Janku (Albania)

25 March 2015
21:00

Italy	2 – 0	Scotland
Bianchi 65'; Rosina 70'	Report

Stadio Pietro Fortunati, Pavia
Attendance: 5,000
Referee: Marian Mircea Salomir (Romania)
29 March 2015
13:00

Moldova	1 – 3	Norway
Picușceac 81'	Report	Strand 54'; Moen 83'; B. Riise 90'

Dinamo Stadium, Chișinău
Attendance: 1,200
Referee: Merab Malaguradze (Georgia)
29 March 2015
17:00

Slovenia	1 – 4	Belarus
Birsa 1'	Report	Afanasyev 3'; Kornilenko 67', 90+1'; Shkabara 90+2'

ŽŠD Ljubljana Stadium, Ljubljana
Attendance: 1,500
Referee: Tony Asumaa (Finland)

3 June 2005
18:00

Belarus	1 – 2	Slovenia
Rodionov 73'	Report	Birsa 40' (pen.); Robnik 45'

Traktor Stadium, Minsk
Attendance: 5,000
Referee: Csaba Sápi (Hungary)
3 June 2005
20:00

Norway	1 – 0	Italy
B. Riise 78'	Report

Marienlyst Stadion, Drammen
Attendance: 2,000
Referee: Joeri Van De Velde (Belgium)
3 June 2005
20:45

Scotland	0 – 0	Moldova
	Report

Firhill Stadium, Glasgow
Attendance: 1,499
Referee: Christopher Lautier (Malta)

7 June 2005
18:00

Belarus	3 – 2	Scotland
Kovel 2'; Stashchanyuk 49'; Afanasyev 51'	Report	Whittaker 58'; Clarkson 86'

Traktor Stadium, Minsk
Attendance: 5,000
Referee: Lasha Silagava (Georgia)

2 September 2005
15:00

Moldova	1 – 0	Belarus
Picușceac 37'	Report

Dinamo Stadium, Chișinău
Attendance: 1,800
Referee: Siniša Zrnić (Bosnia and Herzegovina)
2 September 2005
17:00

Slovenia	2 – 2	Norway
Stevanović 50', 88'	Report	Sokolowski 12', 34'

Domžale Sports Park, Domžale
Attendance: 2,000
Referee: Serhiy Berezka (Ukraine)
2 September 2005
20:30

Scotland	0 – 3 (awarded)	Italy
Diamond 45+1'; Gallagher 74'	Report	Lazzari 53'; Pepe 77'

Fir Park, Motherwell
Attendance: 5,913
Referee: Kevin Blom (Netherlands)
- Match originally ended 2–2 and awarded to Italy due to Scotland fielding a suspended player.

6 September 2005
18:00

Belarus	1 – 1	Italy
Kontsevoy 11'	Report	Lazzari 8'

City Stadium, Borisov
Attendance: 3,500
Referee: Christoforos Zografos (Greece)
6 September 2005
20:00

Norway	0 – 1	Scotland
	Report	Gallagher 7'

Marienlyst Stadion, Drammen
Attendance: 2,207
Referee: Igor Zakharov (Russia)
7 September 2005
15:00

Moldova	1 – 3	Slovenia
Josan 30'	Report	Burgić 5', 42'; Birsa 75'

Dinamo Stadium, Chișinău
Attendance: 1,000
Referee: Audrius Žuta (Lithuania)

7 October 2005
20:00

Norway	1 – 2	Moldova
Olsen 56'	Report	Calincov 57'; Țîgîrlaș 72'

Marienlyst Stadion, Drammen
Attendance: 1,082
Referee: Lassin Isaksen (Faroe Islands)
7 October 2005
20:30

Scotland	2 – 3	Belarus
Duffy 3'; Robertson 46'	Report	Kontsevoy 57'; Kovel 65'; Afanasyev 78'

Broadwood Stadium, Cumbernauld
Attendance: 3,000
Referee: Paulius Malžinskas (Lithuania)
7 October 2005
21:00

Italy	1 – 0	Slovenia
Palladino 18'	Report

Stadio Romeo Menti, Vicenza
Attendance: 3,000
Referee: Richard Havrilla (Slovakia)

11 October 2005
18:00

Italy	1 – 0	Moldova
Palladino 85'	Report

Stadio Centro d'Italia, Rieti
Attendance: 2,000
Referee: Pavel Královec (Czech Republic)
11 October 2005
18:00

Slovenia	3 – 0	Scotland
Ljubijankić 36'; Stevanović 60', 90+2'	Report

Ob Jezeru City Stadium, Velenje
Attendance: 1,500
Referee: José Luis Mengual Prades (Andorra)
11 October 2005
18:00

Belarus	2 – 3	Norway
V.Hleb 22'; Kontsevoy 51'	Report	Amundsen 6'; Myklebust 36'; B.Riise 71'

City Stadium, Borisov
Attendance: 5,500
Referee: Stefan Johannesson (Sweden)

== Goalscorers ==
- TBD
