= Paweł Hajduczek =

Polish footballer

Personal information
- Date of birth: 12 November 1982 (age 43)
- Place of birth: Jastrzębie-Zdrój, Poland
- Height: 1.87 m (6 ft 2 in)
- Position: Midfielder

Youth career
- 2000–2002: AJ Auxerre

Senior career*
Years	Team	Apps	(Gls)
2002–2003	Polonia Warsaw	8	(0)
2003–2004	Znicz Pruszków	16	(3)
2004–2005	GKS Jastrzębie	32	(2)
2005–2007	AE Giannina	53	(6)
2007–2008	Olympiacos Volos		
2008–2010	Tavriya Simferopol	37	(2)
2010–2011	Metalurh Zaporizhzhia	13	(0)
2011–2012	Chojniczanka Chojnice	11	(0)
2013	Sioni Bolnisi	9	(1)
2014	ŁKS Łódź		
2015	LKS Rosanów		
2017–2018	Więcej Niż Sport Łódź	4	(0)
Total		183	(14)

International career
1998–1999	Poland U16	6	(0)
Medal record
Men's football
Representing Poland
UEFA European Under-16 Championship
Runner-up	1999 Czech Republic
- * Club domestic league appearances and goals

Paweł Hajduczek (born 12 November 1982) is a Polish former professional footballer who played as a midfielder.

== Honours ==
Poland U16

- UEFA European Under-16 Championship runner-up: 1999
