= 2006 UEFA European Under-21 Championship qualification =

The qualifying groups for the 2006 UEFA European Under-21 Championship, where possible, matched the 7- and 6-team World Cup 2006 qualifying groups of the senior European teams. The exceptions were where Andorra, Faroe Islands, Liechtenstein, and Northern Ireland were involved; none of whom entered an under-21 team. Germany, whose seniors did not need to qualify for the World Cup (as they will be hosts) were added to one of the 5-team groups created by the absence of the aforementioned nations.

Europe's 48 national under-21 teams entering were divided into eight groups (six groups of 6 + one group of 5 + one group of 7). The eight group winners played off against the eight group runners-up on a two-legged home-and-away basis to decide the eight qualifying teams.

== Qualifying Groups ==
=== Draw ===
The allocation of teams into qualifying groups was based on that of 2006 FIFA World Cup qualification with several changes, reflecting the absence of some nations:

- Groups 2, 5, 7 and 8 featured the same nations
- Group 1 did not include Andorra
- Group 3 did not include Liechtenstein
- Group 4 did not include Faroe Islands
- Group 6 did not include Northern Ireland, but included Germany (who did not participate in World Cup qualification)

This was the last time when this grouping schema was applied for U21 qualifying groups.

=== Group 1 ===
Team	Pld	W	D	L	GF	GA	GD	Pts
Netherlands	10	7	2	1	21	7	+14	23
Czech Republic	10	6	3	1	26	8	+18	21
Romania	10	6	1	3	17	8	+9	19
Macedonia	10	2	3	5	9	18	−9	9
Finland	10	2	1	7	7	16	−9	7
Armenia	10	1	2	7	2	25	−23	5

	(Armenia)	(Czech Republic)	(Finland)	(North Macedonia)	(Netherlands)	(Romania)
Armenia	—	0–4	0–1	0–0	1–3	0–5
Czech Republic	6–0	—	3–0	2–0	2–4	4–1
Finland	0–1	1–3	—	2–0	1–2	0–1
Macedonia	4–0	2–2	1–1	—	0–2	1–0
Netherlands	0–0	0–0	4–1	4–0	—	2–0
Romania	2–0	0–0	1–0	5–1	2–0	—

=== Group 2 ===
Team	Pld	W	D	L	GF	GA	GD	Pts
Denmark	12	9	2	1	30	12	+18	29
Ukraine	12	7	2	3	22	7	+15	23
Greece	12	6	2	4	18	9	+9	20
Turkey	12	5	4	3	15	9	+6	19
Georgia	12	3	2	7	7	22	−15	11
Albania	12	2	3	7	9	27	−18	9
Kazakhstan	12	2	1	9	8	23	−15	7

	(Albania)	(Denmark)	(Georgia (country))	(Greece)	(Kazakhstan)	(Turkey)	(Ukraine)
Albania	—	1–2	0–1	1–1	3–1	1–1	1–1
Denmark	7–0	—	1–0	2–1	5–1	1–1	3–2
Georgia	2–1	2–4	—	1–1	0–1	0–2	0–3
Greece	2–0	0–1	3–0	—	5–0	2–1	0–1
Kazakhstan	0–1	1–1	0–1	1–2	—	2–1	0–1
Turkey	4–0	3–2	0–0	0–1	1–0	—	1–0
Ukraine	5–0	0–1	6–0	1–0	2–1	0–0	—

=== Group 3 ===
Team	Pld	W	D	L	GF	GA	GD	Pts
Portugal	10	10	0	0	29	3	+26	30
Russia	10	6	1	3	24	6	+18	19 (Note: Head-to-head results: Russia 4–0 Slovakia, Slovakia 1–0 Russia)
Slovakia	10	6	1	3	12	9	+3	19
Latvia	10	3	3	4	10	16	−6	12
Estonia	10	0	3	7	4	24	−20	3
Luxembourg	10	0	2	8	4	25	−21	2

	(Estonia)	(Latvia)	(Luxembourg)	(Portugal)	(Russia)	(Slovakia)
Estonia	—	1–3	0–0	0–5	1–5	0–2
Latvia	0–0	—	2–1	1–2	0–4	0–0
Luxembourg	1–1	1–2	—	1–6	0–4	0–2
Portugal	3–0	3–0	4–0	—	2–0	2–1
Russia	3–0	1–1	3–0	0–1	—	4–0
Slovakia	2–1	3–1	1–0	0–1	1–0	—

=== Group 4 ===
Team	Pld	W	D	L	GF	GA	GD	Pts
France	8	6	1	1	13	5	+8	19
Switzerland	8	4	3	1	15	8	+7	15 (Note: Head-to-head results: Switzerland 0–0 Israel, Israel 1–1 Switzerland)
Israel	8	4	3	1	11	7	+4	15
Republic of Ireland	8	1	2	5	10	14	−4	5
Cyprus	8	0	1	7	2	17	−15	1

	(Cyprus)	(France)	(Republic of Ireland)	(Israel)	(Switzerland)
Cyprus	—	0–1	1–1	0–1	1–5
France	2–0	—	1–0	1–0	1–1
Republic of Ireland	3–0	1–2	—	2–2	0–1
Israel	1–0	3–2	3–1	—	1–1
Switzerland	3–0	0–3	4–2	0–0	—

=== Group 5 ===
Team	Pld	W	D	L	GF	GA	GD	Pts
Italy	10	8	1	1	16	3	+13	25
Slovenia	10	4	3	3	13	13	0	15
Norway	10	4	2	4	14	13	+1	14
Belarus	10	4	1	5	20	19	+1	13
Moldova	10	3	2	5	8	12	−4	11
Scotland	10	1	3	6	6	17	−11	6

	(Belarus)	(Italy)	(Moldova)	(Norway)	(Scotland)	(Slovenia)
Belarus	—	1–1	2–3	2–3	3–2	1–2
Italy	2–1	—	1–0	1–0	2–0	1–0
Moldova	1–0	0–1	—	1–3	0–0	1–3
Norway	2–3	1–0	1–2	—	0–1	0–0
Scotland	2–3	0–3	0–0	0–2	—	1–1
Slovenia	1–4	0–3	1–0	2–2	3–0	—

=== Group 6 ===
Team	Pld	W	D	L	GF	GA	GD	Pts
Germany	10	7	3	0	24	5	+19	24
England	10	6	3	1	21	7	+14	21
Poland	10	3	4	3	18	18	0	13
Austria	10	3	2	5	9	14	−5	11
Wales	10	3	1	6	9	21	−12	10
Azerbaijan	10	0	3	7	1	17	−16	3

	(Austria)	(Azerbaijan)	(England)	(Germany)	(Poland)	(Wales)
Austria	—	3–0	0–2	0–3	0–3	2–0
Azerbaijan	0–0	—	0–0	0–2	1–1	0–1
England	1–2	2–0	—	2–2	4–1	2–0
Germany	2–0	2–0	1–1	—	1–1	4–0
Poland	2–2	3–0	1–3	1–3	—	3–2
Wales	1–0	3–0	0–4	0–4	2–2	—

=== Group 7 ===
Team	Pld	W	D	L	GF	GA	GD	Pts
Belgium	10	7	3	0	25	6	+19	24
Serbia and Montenegro	10	7	1	2	29	11	+18	22
Spain	10	6	2	2	37	8	+29	20
Bosnia and Herzegovina	10	3	1	6	17	20	−3	10 (Note: Head-to-head results: Bosnia and Herzegovina 2–0 Lithuania, Lithuania 1–0 Bosnia and Herzegovina)
Lithuania	10	3	1	6	9	16	−7	10
San Marino	10	0	0	10	4	60	−56	0

	(Belgium)	(Bosnia and Herzegovina)	(Lithuania)	(Serbia and Montenegro)	(San Marino)	(Spain)
Belgium	—	2–1	3–0	4–0	5–0	1–0
Bosnia and Herzegovina	1–1	—	2–0	1–3	5–1	0–2
Lithuania	1–2	1–0	—	0–2	2–0	1–1
Serbia and Montenegro	1–1	5–1	3–2	—	9–0	1–0
San Marino	0–4	1–4	1–2	0–5	—	1–10
Spain	2–2	4–2	2–0	2–0	14–0	—

=== Group 8 ===
Team	Pld	W	D	L	GF	GA	GD	Pts
Croatia	10	8	1	1	14	6	+8	25
Hungary	10	6	1	3	12	7	+5	19
Sweden	10	6	0	4	16	12	+4	18
Iceland	10	4	1	5	15	11	+4	13
Bulgaria	10	2	1	7	9	17	−8	7
Malta	10	1	2	7	3	16	−13	5

	(Bulgaria)	(Croatia)	(Hungary)	(Iceland)	(Malta)	(Sweden)
Bulgaria	—	2–1	1–2	1–3	2–1	1–2
Croatia	1–0	—	1–0	2–1	1–0	1–0
Hungary	1–0	2–2	—	1–0	2–0	0–1
Iceland	3–1	1–2	0–1	—	0–0	3–1
Malta	1–1	0–1	0–2	1–0	—	0–1
Sweden	2–0	0–2	2–1	1–4	6–0	—

== Play-offs ==
Group winners played at home in the second leg.

Team 1	Agg.	Team 2	1st leg	2nd leg
England	2–3	France	1–1	1–2
Czech Republic	0–3	Germany	0–2	0–1
Hungary	1–2	Italy	1–1	0–1
Serbia and Montenegro	5–2	Croatia	3–1	2–1
Ukraine	5–4	Belgium	2–3	3–1
Russia	1–4	Denmark	0–1	1–3
Switzerland	2–3	Portugal	1–1	1–2
Slovenia	0–2	Netherlands	0–0	0–2
