= Marek Szmid =

English footballer

Personal information
- Full name: Marek Andrezj Szmid
- Date of birth: 2 March 1982 (age 44)
- Place of birth: Nuneaton, England
- Height: 5 ft 8 in (1.73 m)
- Position: Midfielder

Youth career
- 1998–2001: Manchester United

Senior career*
Years	Team	Apps	(Gls)
2001–2002	Southend United	2	(0)
2002–2003	Sutton Coldfield Town		
2003	Marine		
2003–2004	Nuneaton Griff		
2004–2005	Nuneaton Borough		
2004–2005	Liverpool John Moores University		
2005–2006	Vauxhall Motors		

International career
1997–1998	ESFA U15		
1998–1999	England U16		
- England U17
2005	England futsal	6	(1)
- * Club domestic league appearances and goals

Marek Andrezj Szmid (born 2 March 1982) is an English retired professional footballer who played as a midfielder.

== Early life ==
Szmid was born in Nuneaton, Warwickshire.

== Club career ==
=== Manchester United ===
Szmid signed for Manchester United as a youth trainee in July 1998. He made his first appearance for United in the friendly against the San Diego Nomads in August. He scored his first goal for the club in the FA Premier Academy League under-17 match against Derby County on 12 September. United won the game 4−0. On 5 December, Szmid made his first appearance for the reserves; he replaced Lee Roche in the friendly against a Major League Soccer under-21 side. He featured in the NIVEA Junior Football Tournament in April 1999 and played against the likes of Bayern Munich and VfB Stuttgart as United were runners-up. In July, he played in every game as United participated in the Milk Cup in Northern Ireland. They lost 2−1 to Crewe Alexandra in the final.

Szmid played in the Jersey Tournament in August 1999; he took part in the win versus Rangers and the defeat against Benfica. On 21 September, he signed his first professional contract with United. He played in the 2−1 defeat against Nottingham Forest in the FA Youth Cup third round at Gigg Lane. Szmid made 20 appearances as United finished third in Group B before falling to West Ham United in FA Premier Academy League under-19 playoffs. Post season he was part of the squad that took part in the International Youth Tournament hosted by Real Sociedad. He started all three group games against Sevilla, Osasuna, and Real Sociedad, but United failed to qualify for the final.

In August 2000, Szmid played in the Bayern Munich Centenary Youth Tournament; he featured in four games and scored in the 2−2 draw with IFK Göteborg. He scored for the reserves in the friendly against Bristol City in September. The game, a testimonial for City's Buster Footman, finished 4−0 at Ashton Gate. He featured throughout United's run to the Manchester Senior Cup final but was an unused substitute in the final defeat to Manchester City at Old Trafford in May 2001. He was released by United on 30 June. Szmid spent just over three years at United but failed to make a senior appearance.

=== Southend United ===
Szmid signed for Third Division club Southend United in November 2001. His first involvement with the first team was as an unused substitute in the defeat at Shrewsbury Town on 24 November. On 23 February 2002, he made his debut when he replaced Brian Barry-Murphy in the 80th minute of the 5−1 defeat against Hartlepool United. Szmid was involved in several other matchday squads before the end of the season, but he only made one more appearance for United when he started the defeat against Leyton Orient in March. This was his final appearance for Southend and he left the club in the summer.

=== Later career ===
Szmid later played non-league football with Sutton Coldfield Town and Marine. In the same season he moved to play for Nuneaton Griff. In 2004, he played for Nuneaton Borough. The next season saw him playing for Vauxhall Motors. That season saw him suffering a bad injury which caused him to retire from playing football.

== International career ==
=== ESFA U15 ===
Szmid represented English Schools' Football Association (ESFA) under-15s and the team reached 3rd place of the mini World Cup at the Montaigu Tournament in France. He was in the last ESFA under-15 team when they beat Germany 1–0 at the Olympic Stadium in Berlin, before The Football Association took over the running of Schools' Football.

=== England U16 ===
Szmid represented England at 1999 UEFA European Under-16 Championship in the Czech Republic. He featured in the quarter final defeat against the Czech Republic on 2 May 1999; he played 61 minutes before being replaced by Jay Bothroyd as England lost 1−0 after extra time.

=== England futsal ===
Szmid was called up to the England national futsal team for the Four Nations tournament in March 2005. On 9 March, he made his debut against France and scored a penalty in the 5−2 defeat in Villeneuve-d'Ascq, France. Two days later, he played in the loss against Finland as England finished last place in the tournament.

== Post-retirement ==
After retiring, he attended Liverpool John Moores University where he graduated with a B.A. in Sports Development in 2007. Whilst studying he suffered a severe injury which caused his playing career to stop. The following year he attended the University of Chester where he took part in the GTP (Graduate Teacher Programme). He started teaching Physical Education at Ashton-on-Mersey School in Trafford in 2008. In September 2010 he started work as the Assistant Head of Education and Welfare at Manchester United F.C.

In September 2022, Szmid took up the position of Academy Player Care Manager at the Liverpool F.C. Academy.

== Career statistics ==
Appearances and goals by club, season and competition
Club	Season	League			Cup		League Cup		Other		Total	
Club	Season	Division	Apps	Goals	Apps	Goals	Apps	Goals	Apps	Goals	Apps	Goals
Southend United	2001–02	Third Division	2	0	0	0	0	0	0	0	2	0
Career total			2	0	0	0	0	0	0	0	2	0
