= Łukasz Nawotczyński =

Polish footballer

Personal information
- Full name: Łukasz Nawotczyński
- Date of birth: 30 March 1982 (age 44)
- Place of birth: Ciechanów, Poland
- Height: 1.89 m (6 ft 2 in)
- Position: Defender

Youth career
- SP 3 Ciechanów
- 1999: Lechia Gdańsk
- 2000: Wisła Kraków

Senior career*
Years	Team	Apps	(Gls)
2000–2006	Wisła Kraków	9	(0)
2002	→ Arka Gdynia (loan)	11	(1)
2004	→ Górnik Polkowice (loan)	12	(1)
2004	→ GKS Katowice (loan)	6	(0)
2005–2006	→ Jagiellonia Białystok (loan)	44	(0)
2006–2008	Jagiellonia Białystok	45	(0)
2008	→ Korona Kielce (loan)	13	(1)
2009–2010	Korona Kielce	16	(1)
2011–2012	Cracovia	15	(0)
2011	Cracovia (ME)	4	(0)
2013–2016	Zawisza Bydgoszcz	41	(0)
2016–2017	MKS Ciechanów		

International career
1998–1999	Poland U16		
1999–2000	Poland U17		
2000–2001	Poland U18		
2002–2003	Poland U21		
2004	Poland B	1	(0)
Medal record
Men's football
Representing Poland
UEFA European Under-18 Championship
Winner	2001 Finland
UEFA European Under-16 Championship
Runner-up	1999 Czech Republic
- * Club domestic league appearances and goals

Łukasz Nawotczyński (born 30 March 1982 in Ciechanów) is a Polish former professional footballer who played as a defender.

== Career ==
=== Club ===
He played for clubs such as Wisła Kraków, Lechia Gdańsk, Górnik Polkowice, GKS Katowice, Jagiellonia Białystok and Korona Kielce.

=== International ===
Nawotczyński was a member of the Poland U17s team that participated in the 1999 FIFA U-17 World Championship.

== Honours ==
Wisła Kraków

- Ekstraklasa: 2000–01, 2003–04
- Polish Cup: 2001–02, 2002–03
- Polish League Cup: 2000–01

Zawisza Bydgoszcz

- I liga: 2012–13
- Polish Cup: 2013–14

Poland U16

- UEFA European Under-16 Championship runner-up: 1999

Poland U18

- UEFA European Under-18 Championship: 2001
