= Emir Bihorac =

Serbian footballer

Personal information
- Full name: Emir Bihorac
- Date of birth: 19 July 1982 (age 44)
- Place of birth: Novi Pazar, SFR Yugoslavia
- Height: 1.82 m (5 ft 11 1/2 in)
- Position: Midfielder

Youth career
- 1993–2001: Novi Pazar

Senior career*
Years	Team	Apps	(Gls)
2001–2002	Novi Pazar	12	(2)
2002–2005	Vojvodina	37	(1)
2005–2006	Novi Pazar	31	(0)
2006–2007	ČSK Čelarevo	8	(0)
2007–2009	Novi Pazar	32	(2)
2009–2010	Varbergs GIF		
2010–2011	Novi Pazar	0	(0)
2017	Jošanica		
- * Club domestic league appearances and goals

Emir Bihorac (Serbian Cyrillic: Емир Бихорац; born 19 July 1982) is a Serbian retired footballer.

== Playing career ==
Born in Novi Pazar (SR Serbia, SFR Yugoslavia), he played most of his career in his birth-town club FK Novi Pazar which he joined in 1993, He joined FK Vojvodina where he played between 2002 and 2005 in the First League of Serbia and Montenegro. He also with FK ČSK Čelarevo and in Sweden, with Varbergs GIF. He came out of retirement in April 2017 to help FK Jošanica in their battle against relegation.
