= Andrei Ryabykh (footballer, born 1978) =

Russian footballer

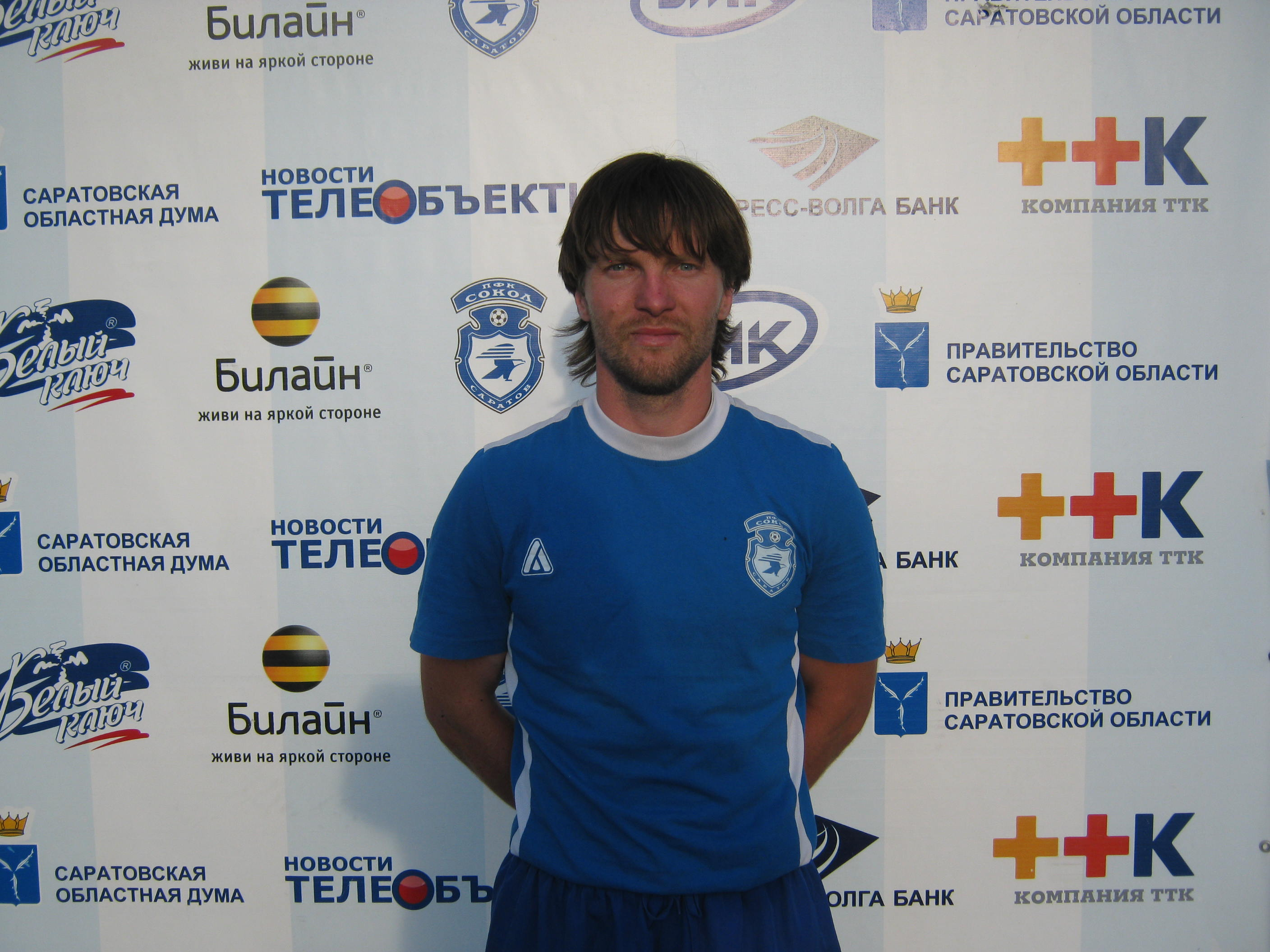
- Ryabykh in 2012

Personal information
- Full name: Andrei Vladimirovich Ryabykh
- Date of birth: 24 December 1978 (age 47)
- Place of birth: Balashov, Saratov Oblast, Russian SFSR
- Height: 1.76 m (5 ft 9 1/2 in)
- Positions: Midfielder; defender

Senior career*
| Years | Team | Apps | (Gls) |
| 1998–2003 | FC Iskra Engels | 137 | (3) |
| 2003–2005 | FC Sokol Saratov | 74 | (0) |
| 2006–2008 | FC Mordovia Saransk | 99 | (6) |
| 2009–2014 | FC Sokol Saratov | 115 | (6) |
- * Club domestic league appearances and goals

Andrei Vladimirovich Ryabykh (Russian: Андрей Владимирович Рябых; born 24 December 1978) is a former Russian professional football player.

Ryabykh played in the Russian Football National League with FC Sokol Saratov and FC Mordovia Saransk.
