= 1999 UEFA European Under-16 Championship =

1999 UEFA Under-16 Championship
Mistrovství Evropy ve fotbale hráčů do 16 let 1999

Tournament details
- Host country: Czech Republic
- Dates: 24 April – 7 May
- Teams: 16 (from 1 confederation)

Final positions
- Champions: Spain (5th title)
- Runners-up: Poland
- Third place: Germany
- Fourth place: Czech Republic

Tournament statistics
- Matches played: 32
- Goals scored: 97 (3.03 per match)

The 1999 UEFA European Under-16 Championship was the 17th edition of UEFA's European Under-16 Football Championship. Czech Republic hosted the championship, from 24 April to 7 May 1999. Players born on or after 1 January 1982 were eligible to participate in this competition. 16 teams entered the competition, and Spain defeated Poland in the final to win the competition for the fifth time.

== Participants ==
- Croatia
- Czech Republic
- Denmark
- England
- Finland
- Germany
- Greece
- Hungary
- Israel
- Poland
- Portugal
- Russia
- Slovakia
- Spain
- Sweden
- Switzerland

== Group stage ==
=== Group A ===
Team	Pld	W	D	L	GF	GA	GD	Pts
Portugal	3	2	1	0	7	5	+2	7
Israel	3	2	0	1	7	5	+2	6
Switzerland	3	1	1	1	7	6	+1	4
Finland	3	0	0	3	5	10	−5	0

24 April 1999

Israel	3–2	Finland
Oved 31'; Tzur 45'; Eli Bitton 70'

Blansko
Referee: Georgios Kasnaferis (Greece)
24 April 1999

Portugal	2–2	Switzerland
Pedro Nuno 23'; Martins 38'	Report	Baumann 61' (pen.); Luyet 64'

Vranovice
Referee: Anton Guenov (Bulgaria)

26 April 1999

Israel	1–2	Portugal
Eli Biton 48'	Report	Zamorano 36' (pen.); Vítor Silva 41'

Třebíč
Referee: David Malcolm (Republic of Ireland)
26 April 1999

Finland	1–4	Switzerland

Jihlava
Referee: Karel Vidlak (Czech Republic)

28 April 1999

Switzerland	1–3	Israel
		Lavan 57'; Tzur 76'; Bitton 80'

Sportovní areál Drnovice, Drnovice
Referee: Egill Mar Markusson (Iceland)
28 April 1999

Finland	2–3	Portugal
Hahto 20'; Haara 44'	Report	Hugo Moreira 12', 37'; Postiga 75'

Blansko
Referee: Bernhard Brugger (Austria)

=== Group B ===
Team	Pld	W	D	L	GF	GA	GD	Pts
England	3	2	1	0	6	3	+3	7
Slovakia	3	2	0	1	5	4	+1	6
Sweden	3	1	0	2	3	5	−2	3
Hungary	3	0	1	2	3	5	−2	1

24 April 1999

Hungary	1–1	England

Staré Město
Referee: Paulo Manuel Gomes Costa (Portugal)
24 April 1999

Slovakia	2–0	Sweden

Slušovice
Referee: Darius Miezelis (Lithuania)

26 April 1999

Hungary	1–2	Slovakia

Zlín
Referee: Massimo Busacca (Switzerland)
26 April 1999

England	2–1	Sweden

Kunovice
Referee: Anton Guenov (Bulgaria)

28 April 1999

Sweden	2–1	Hungary

Kunovice
Referee: David Malcolm (Republic of Ireland)
28 April 1999

England	3–1	Slovakia

Staré Město
Referee: Georgios Kasnaferis (Greece)

=== Group C ===
Team	Pld	W	D	L	GF	GA	GD	Pts
Spain	3	3	0	0	6	0	+6	9
Poland	3	1	1	1	3	5	−2	4
Russia	3	1	0	2	2	3	−1	3
Croatia	3	0	1	2	1	4	−3	1

24 April 1999

Spain	2–0	Croatia
Arteta 15'; Sancet 79'

Moravská Třebová
Referee: Massimo Busacca (Switzerland)
24 April 1999

Russia	1–2	Poland

Uničov
Referee: David Malcolm (Republic of Ireland)

26 April 1999
13:00

Croatia	1–1	Poland
Srna 42'

LeRK Prostějov, Prostějov
Attendance: 2,700
Referee: Egill Mar Markusson (Iceland)
26 April 1999

Spain	1–0	Russia
Perona 3'

Uničov
Referee: Georgios Kasnaferis (Greece)

28 April 1999

Poland	0–3	Spain
		Aitor 9'; Perona 65'; Aspas 71'

Andrův stadion, Olomouc
Referee: Karel Vidlak (Czech Republic)
28 April 1999

Croatia	0–1	Russia

Moravská Třebová
Referee: Éric Poulat (France)

=== Group D ===
Team	Pld	W	D	L	GF	GA	GD	Pts
Germany	3	2	0	1	3	2	+1	6
Czech Republic	3	2	0	1	3	1	+2	6
Denmark	3	1	0	2	2	2	0	3
Greece	3	1	0	2	1	4	−3	3

24 April 1999

Denmark	0–1	Greece

Šardice
Referee: Bernhard Brugger (Austria)
25 April 1999

Czech Republic	0–1	Germany
	Report	Heller 37'

Sokol Lanžhot, Lanžhot
Attendance: 3,150
Referee: Éric Poulat (France)

26 April 1999

Germany	2–0	Greece
Hitzlsperger 51'; Wörle 75'

FC VMG Kyjov, Kyjov
Referee: Paulo Manuel Gomes da Costa (Portugal)
27 April 1999

Czech Republic	1–0	Denmark
Majer 79'	Report

Městský stadion, Ratíškovice
Attendance: 4,200
Referee: Darius Miezelis (Lithuania)

28 April 1999

Germany	0–2	Denmark

Sokol Lanžhot, Lanžhot
Referee: Massimo Busacca (Switzerland)
29 April 1999

Czech Republic	2–0	Greece
Lizák 7' (pen.); Bystroň 52'	Report

FC VMG Kyjov, Kyjov
Attendance: 6,800
Referee: Anton Guenov (Bulgaria)

== Knockout stage ==
=== Bracket ===
Quarter-finals
1 May – Jihlava
Portugal	1
Poland	2
2 May – Zlín
England	0
Czech Republic (a.e.t.)	1
2 May – Ratíškovice
Germany	6
Slovakia	0
1 May – Prostějov
Spain	5
Israel	1

Semi-finals
4 May – Kyjov
Poland	3
Czech Republic	2
4 May – Drnovice
Germany	0
Spain	4

Final
7 May – Olomouc
Poland	1
Spain	4
Third place
7 May – Prostějov
Czech Republic	1
Germany	2

=== Quarter-finals ===
1 May 1999

Portugal	1–2	Poland
Vítor Silva 26'	Report	6' Łukasz Madej; 73'Dariusz Zawadzki

Jihlava
Referee: Karel Vidlak (Czech Republic)

1 May 1999

Spain	5–1	Israel
Parri 15'; Perona 26'; Nano 35', 77'; Alegre 41'		Zokol 79'

LeRK Prostějov, Prostějov
Referee: Darius Miezelis (Lithuania)

2 May 1999

Czech Republic	1–0 (a.e.t.)	England
Besta 90+3'	Report

Letná Stadion, Zlín
Attendance: 3,200
Referee: Paulo Manuel Gomes Costa (Portugal)

2 May 1999

Germany	6–0	Slovakia

Městský stadion, Ratíškovice
Referee: Egill Mar Markusson (Iceland)

=== Semi-finals ===
4 May 1999

Czech Republic	2–3	Poland
Plašil 73'; Jun 76'	Report	Mierzejewski 7', 32'; Grzelak 31'

FC VMG Kyjov, Kyjov
Attendance: 7,000
Referee: Bernhard Brugger (Austria)

4 May 1999

Spain	4–0	Germany
Arteta 20', 62'; Perona 37'; Alegre 51'

Sportovní areál Drnovice, Drnovice
Referee: David Malcolm (Republic of Ireland)

=== Third place play-off ===
7 May 1999

Czech Republic	1–2	Germany
Jun 65'	Report	Löring 57'; Wersching 80'

LeRK Prostějov, Prostějov
Attendance: 6,800
Referee: Massimo Busacca (Switzerland)

=== Final ===
7 May 1999

Poland	1–4	Spain
Grzelak 28'		Perona 21'; Mario 60'; Ernesto 69'; Molina 81'

Andrův stadion, Olomouc
Attendance: 1,500
Referee: Éric Poulat (France)
