= Andrei Ryabykh (footballer, born 1982) =

Russian footballer

Personal information
- Full name: Andrei Mitrofanovich Ryabykh
- Date of birth: 16 May 1982 (age 44)
- Place of birth: Voronezh, Russian SFSR
- Height: 1.81 m (5 ft 11 1/2 in)
- Position: Midfielder

Youth career
- SDYuSShOR-14 Voronezh

Senior career*
Years	Team	Apps	(Gls)
1998–1999	FC Olimpia Volgograd (D4)		
2000–2002	FC Olimpia Volgograd	75	(30)
2002–2004	FC Arsenal Kyiv	13	(1)
2003–2004	→ FC Arsenal-2 Kyiv (loan)	2	(0)
2004	FC CSKA Kyiv	1	(0)
2004	FC Uralan Elista	7	(1)
2005	FC Arsenal Kyiv	8	(0)
2006	FC Telma-Vodnik Nizhny Novgorod		
- * Club domestic league appearances and goals

Andrei Mitrofanovich Ryabykh (Russian: Андрей Митрофанович Рябых; born 16 May 1982) is a former Russian football player.

He represented Russia at the 1999 UEFA European Under-16 Championship.
