= Líbero Parri =

Spanish footballer

Personal information
- Full name: Líbero Parri Romero
- Date of birth: 18 January 1982 (age 44)
- Place of birth: Burjassot, Spain
- Height: 1.74 m (5 ft 8 1/2 in)
- Position: Midfielder

Youth career
- Valencia

Senior career*
Years	Team	Apps	(Gls)
1998–1999	Valencia B	3	(1)
1999–2005	Valencia	2	(0)
1999–2000	→ Villarreal (loan)	27	(3)
2001	→ Elche (loan)	18	(1)
2001–2002	→ Numancia (loan)	21	(1)
2002–2004	→ Albacete (loan)	59	(12)
2004–2005	→ Racing Santander (loan)	26	(0)
2005–2007	Albacete	56	(16)
2007–2009	Cádiz	22	(3)
2008–2009	→ Levante (loan)	24	(4)
2009–2010	Gimnàstic	14	(0)
Total		272	(41)

International career
1998–1999	Spain U16	18	(3)
1998–1999	Spain U17	10	(3)
2000–2001	Spain U18	8	(1)
2000–2003	Spain U21	3	(0)
Medal record
Representing Spain
UEFA European Under-16 Championship
Winner	1999 Czech Republic
- * Club domestic league appearances and goals

Líbero Parri Romero (born 18 January 1982) is a Spanish retired footballer who played as an attacking midfielder.

In a senior career spanning 12 years, he appeared in 212 Segunda División games and scored 34 goals while representing seven clubs, mainly Albacete (four seasons in that tier, five in total).

In La Liga he played 57 matches, with Albacete, Valencia and Racing de Santander.

== Club career ==
Parri was born in Burjassot, Valencian Community. A gifted attacking player who emerged from local Valencia CF's youth system, he never established himself with the first team. During 2000–01 he made his first two and only La Liga appearances with them, against CA Osasuna and Racing de Santander, and finished the season with neighbouring Elche CF.

Until his release on 1 July 2005, Parri was consecutively loaned to CD Numancia, Albacete Balompié and Racing Santander, competing with the last two sides in the top flight – he was subsequently purchased by the second club. From 2007 to 2009 another two campaigns in Segunda División ensued, at Cádiz CF and Levante UD, the latter also in his native region (loaned by Cádiz).

In August 2009, Parri broke ties with Cádiz but stayed in the second level, quickly signing a one-year contract with Gimnàstic de Tarragona. In late June 2010, he was released after one unassuming season – 14 matches out of a possible 42, 272 minutes of play.

After retiring at the age of only 28, Parri worked as a players' agent.

== Honours ==
Spain U16

- UEFA European Under-16 Championship: 1999
