= Trevor Cilia =

Malta international football player (born 1983)

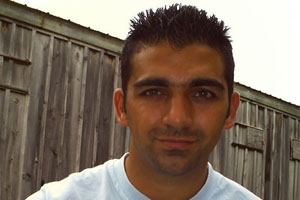

Personal information
- Full name: Trevor Cilia
- Date of birth: 2 January 1983 (age 43)
- Place of birth: Marsa, Malta
- Height: 5 ft 6 in (1.68 m)
- Position: Winger

Team information
- Current team: Għargħur

Youth career
- Floriana

Senior career*
Years	Team	Apps	(Gls)
2000–2008	Floriana	135	(21)
2008–2012	Birkirkara	33	(8)
2012–2015	Sliema	70	(10)
2012–2013	→ Floriana (loan)	28	(3)
2015–2017	Hamrun Spartans		
2017–2018	Marsaxlokk		
2019	Luqa St. Andrew's		
2019–	Għargħur		

International career
	Malta U21	25	(0)
2006–2011	Malta	4	(0)
- * Club domestic league appearances and goals as of 2 November 2016

Trevor Cilia (born 2 January 1983 in Pietà, Malta) is a professional footballer currently playing for Għargħur, where he plays as a midfielder.

Trevor Cilia was part of the 2009–2010 team for Birkirkara, where Birkirkara were crowned champions of the Maltese Premier League for their third time ever in the club's history.

== Playing career ==
Trevor is a Floriana Product whose debut with the 'Greens' was in the Premier League of 2000 at the age of 17. Trevor spent eight successful years with the 'Greens' and, with 135 appearances managed to score 21 goals.

In the Summer Transfer Market of 2008, Trevor was the main target of several main clubs including Birkirkara and it was the 'Stripes' who won Trevor's signature for two years. The 2008–2009 season was not the best for Trevor, as due to his position of retire role of a right back, Trevor could not show off his skills in his favoured position. Although not playing in his favorite position, Trevor still managed to score two goals.

Season 2009–2010 was a special one for Cilia as he was one of the most dangerous strikers of the season. With his daring runs on the wing, Trevor established himself as an important player in the squad. During this season, besides making a good number of assists, he has managed to rank as the 3rd best club scorer with 13 goals. Cilia won his first ever Premier League title in 2010 when, on 5 May he had the joy of lifting the cup for the first time.

In June 2010, 'il-Bazzaz' as he is known among his teammates and numerous fans, extended his stay with Birkirkara by another three years and was the first player to sign the new contract meaning that Trevor shall be wearing the yellow and red shirt, at least until the end of 2012–2013 season.

In 2015, Cilia was signed by Hamrun Spartans F.C.

On 14 September 2019 Għargħur announced, that Cilia had joined the club.
