= Josef Laštovka =

Czech footballer (born 1982)

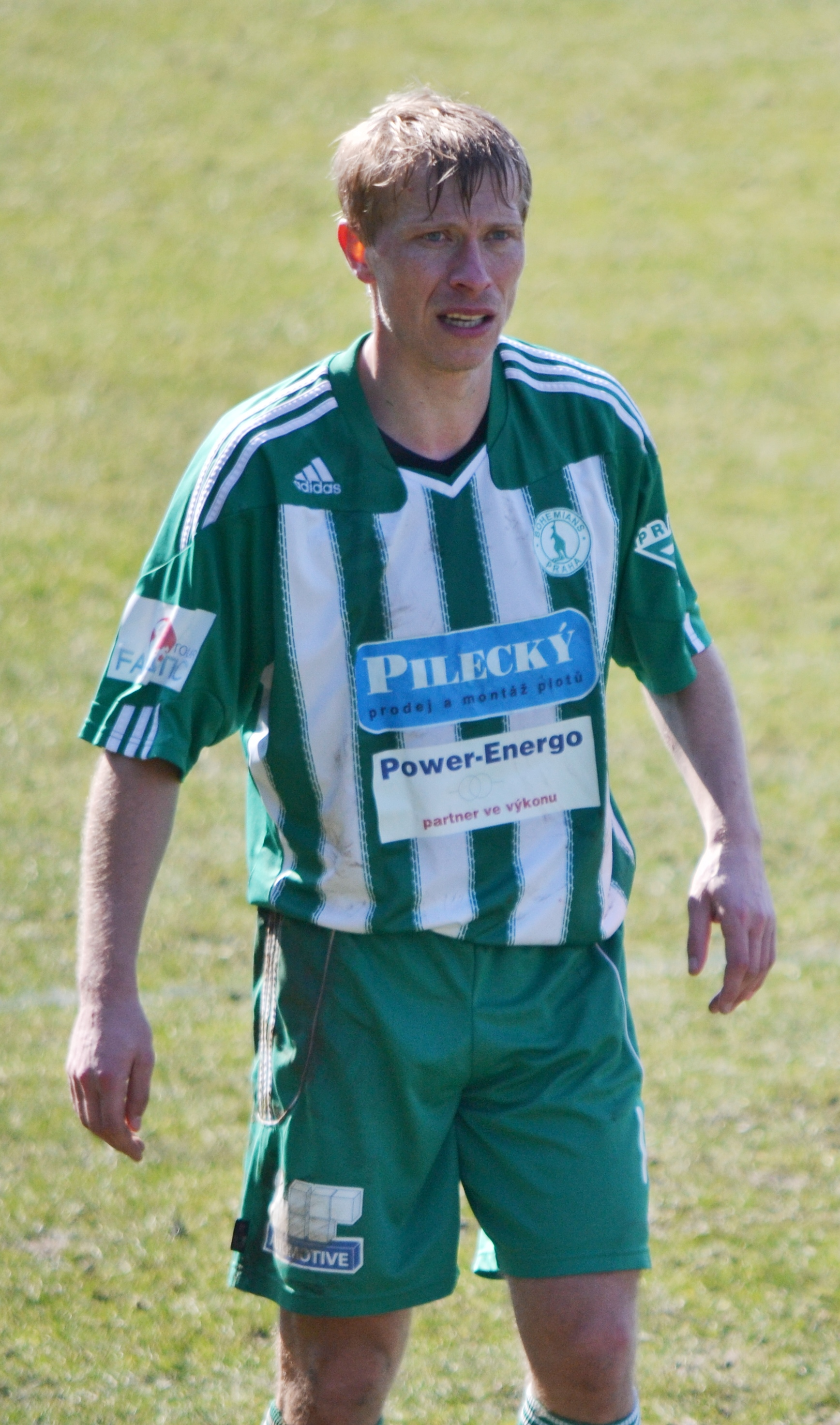
- Josef Laštovka (2013)

Personal information
- Date of birth: 20 February 1982 (age 44)
- Place of birth: Benešov, Czechoslovakia
- Height: 1.72 m (5 ft 8 in)
- Position: Right back

Team information
- Current team: Benešov

Youth career
- 1988–1994: FK Soběhrdy
- 1994–1999: Švarc Benešov

Senior career*
Years	Team	Apps	(Gls)
1999–2005	Jablonec 97	115	(3)
2005–2006	Greuther Fürth	3	(0)
2007–2009	Wacker Burghausen	81	(0)
2009–2011	Dynamo České Budějovice	34	(0)
2011–2012	DAC Dunajská Streda	20	(0)
2012	Torgelower Greif	9	(1)
2013–2015	Bohemians Prague (Střížkov)	5	(0)
2015–	Benešov		

International career^{‡}
1998–1999	Czech Republic U16	9	(2)
1999–2000	Czech Republic U17	8	(1)
1999–2001	Czech Republic U18	16	(4)
2002–2002	Czech Republic U20	2	(0)
- * Club domestic league appearances and goals as of 14 April 2013 ‡ National team caps and goals as of 26 June 2011

Josef Laštovka (born 20 February 1982 in Benešov) is a Czech football player.
