= Kfir Zokol =

Israeli footballer (born 1982)

Kfir Zokol כפיר צוקול
Personal information
- Full name: Kfir Zokol
- Date of birth: July 31, 1982 (age 44)
- Place of birth: Ethiopia
- Height: 5 ft 8 in (1.73 m)
- Position: Midfielder

Youth career
- Maccabi Netanya

Senior career*
Years	Team	Apps	(Gls)
2000–2008	Maccabi Netanya	59	(3)
2004–2005	→ Hapoel Nazareth Illit (loan)	0	(0)
2005	→ Hapoel Ironi Rishon LeZion (loan)		
2006–2007	→ Hapoel Jerusalem (loan)	13	(1)
2007	→ Beitar Shimshon Tel Aviv (loan)	15	(1)
2007–2008	→ Hapoel Umm al-Fahm (loan)	20	(3)
2008–2009	Maccabi Shlomi Nahariya	17	(2)
2010	Maccabi Kafr Kanna	15	(1)
2010–2011	Beitar Petah Tikva	16	(1)
2011–2012	Hapoel Hadera	7	(0)
2012	Ahva Arraba	14	(4)
2012–2013	Hapoel Ahva Haifa	11	(0)

International career
1997–1999	Israel U16	16	(3)
1998	Israel U17	4	(0)
2000	Israel U18	?	(1)
2003	Israel U21	1	(0)
- * Club domestic league appearances and goals

Kfir Zokol (Hebrew: כפיר צוקול; born 31 July 1982) is a retired footballer. Born in Ethiopia, he represented Israel at youth level.

== Career ==
Kfir made his debut for the senior side of Maccabi Netanya in the end of the 1999–00 season. At the start of the 2000–01 season he suffered a serious knee injury from a nasty tackle by Joško Bilić. He missed the entire season after he had to go through surgery. His breakthrough season came in 2002-03 when he was an important part of the successful season Netanya had. In the end of the season he won a cap for the Israel U-21 team and it seemed he was on his way to the top of Israeli football. In the middle of the 2003–04 season Kfir suffered another injury and after that got loaned to teams from the lower divisions until he was released from his contract in Netanya. By most supporters of Netanya he is still regarded as one of the most talented players to never fulfil his full potential.

In 4 seasons with Netanya he managed to play 79 games, score 10 goals and also provided 2 assists in all club competitions.

== Honours ==
- Liga Alef - Northern Division (1):
  - 2007-08
