= Rafał Grzelak =

Polish footballer (born 1982)

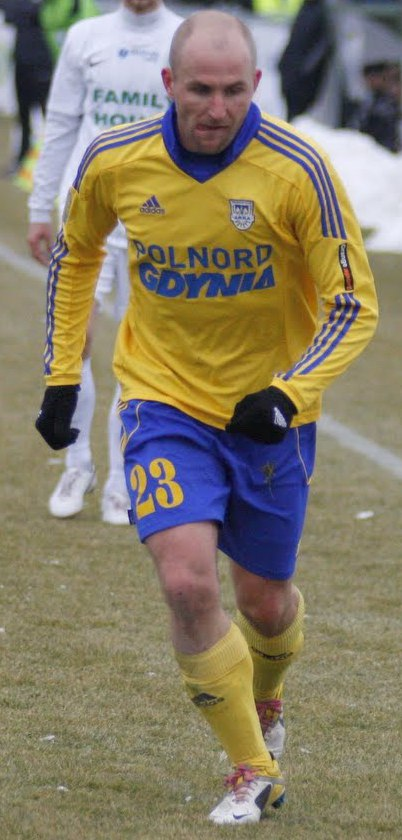
- Grzelak with Arka Gdynia in March 2013

Personal information
- Full name: Rafał Grzelak
- Date of birth: 24 June 1982 (age 44)
- Place of birth: Łódź, Poland
- Height: 1.76 m (5 ft 9 in)
- Position: Left winger

Youth career
- Orzeł Łódź
- Widzew Łódź

Senior career*
Years	Team	Apps	(Gls)
1998–2000	ŁKS Łódź		
2000–2001	Ruch Chorzów	24	(3)
2001–2002	MSV Duisburg	15	(4)
2002–2003	Widzew Łódź	14	(0)
2003	Piotrcovia Piotrków Trybunalski	13	(2)
2003–2004	Lech Poznań	26	(0)
2004–2006	Pogoń Szczecin	45	(4)
2006–2008	→ Boavista (loan)	28	(5)
2006–2008	Boavista	9	(1)
2008–2011	Skoda Xanthi	40	(7)
2009–2010	→ Steaua București (loan)	6	(0)
2010	→ Steaua II București (loan)	1	(0)
2010–2011	→ Widzew Łódź (loan)	7	(0)
2011–2012	Ruch Chorzów	4	(0)
2013	Arka Gdynia	12	(0)
2013–2015	Flota Świnoujście	52	(3)
2015–2018	Chojniczanka Chojnice	89	(9)
2018–2019	KP Starogard Gdański	6	(0)
2019	SV Blau-Weiß Ramsloh		
2020–2022	Prawobrzeże Świnoujście	35	(11)
2022	LKS Różyca	8	(0)
2022	Jutrzenka Bychlew	8	(2)

International career
2007	Poland	1	(0)
Medal record
Men's football
Representing Poland
UEFA European Under-18 Championship
Winner	2001 Finland
UEFA European Under-16 Championship
Runner-up	1999 Czech Republic
- * Club domestic league appearances and goals

Rafał Grzelak (Polish pronunciation: [ˈrafaw ˈɡʐɛlak]; born 24 June 1982) is a Polish former professional footballer who played as a left winger.

== Career ==
Born in Łódź, Grzelak made his Ekstraklasa debut on 22 May 1999 for ŁKS Łódź against Wisła Kraków.

He spent the 2006–07 season on loan at Boavista from Pogon Szczecin. In June 2007, he signed a three-year deal with the Portuguese club. He transferred to Greek side Skoda Xanthi in January 2008. On 30 June 2009, it was reported that Steaua București have signed the Polish midfielder from Skoda Xanthi.

On 23 July 2009, he scored his first goal for Steaua București in a UEFA Europa League match against Újpest FC; he scored the second goal in the 2–1 victory. On 2 August 2009, Grzelak played his first Liga I match in Steaua's shirt against Ceahlăul Piatra Neamţ, Steaua won away with 2–0.

In January 2010, Grzelak was demoted to the B squad.

In August 2011, he joined Ruch Chorzów on a one-year contract.

Grzelak joined KP Starogard Gdański in July 2018.

== Career statistics ==
=== Club ===
As of 26 July 2017

Appearances and goals by club, season and competition
Club	Season	League			National Cup		Europe		Other		Total	
Club	Season	Division	Apps	Goals	Apps	Goals	Apps	Goals	Apps	Goals	Apps	Goals
Xanthi F.C.	2008–09	Super League Greece	27	3	0	0	0	0	0	0	27	3
Steaua București	2009–10	Liga I	6	0	0	0	6 (Note: Appearances in the Europa League)	0	0	0	12	0
Widzew Łódź	2010–11	Ekstraklasa	7	0	2	0	0	0	0	0	9	0
Ruch Chorzów	2011–12	Ekstraklasa	22	0	2	0	0	0	0	0	24	0
Arka Gdynia	2012–13	I liga	12	0	0	0	0	0	0	0	12	0
Flota Świnoujście	2013–14	I liga	33	1	2	0	0	0	0	0	35	1
Flota Świnoujście	2014–15	I liga	19	2	1	0	0	0	0	0	20	2
Flota Świnoujście	Total		52	3	3	0	0	0	0	0	55	3
Chojniczanka Chojnice	2014–15	I liga	13	2	0	0	0	0	0	0	13	2
Chojniczanka Chojnice	2015–16	I liga	25	2	4	1	0	0	0	0	29	3
Chojniczanka Chojnice	2016–17	I liga	28	4	3	0	0	0	0	0	31	4
Chojniczanka Chojnice	Total		66	8	7	1	0	0	0	0	73	9
Career total			182	14	14	1	6	0	0	0	202	15

== Honours ==
Lech Poznań

- Polish Cup: 2003–04
- Polish Super Cup: 2004

Poland U18

- UEFA European Under-18 Championship: 2001

Poland U16

- UEFA European Under-16 Championship runner-up: 1999
