= Alan Zaseyev =

Russian footballer

Personal information
- Full name: Alan Khristoforovich Zaseyev
- Date of birth: 16 March 1982 (age 44)
- Place of birth: Beslan, Russian SFSR
- Height: 1.75 m (5 ft 9 in)
- Position: Forward

Youth career
- SDYuSShOR Yunost Vladikavkaz

Senior career*
Years	Team	Apps	(Gls)
1998–2001	FC Avtodor Vladikavkaz	83	(26)
2002–2003	FC Alania Vladikavkaz	1	(0)
2002	→ FC Alania-d Vladikavkaz (loan)	5	(1)
2003–2004	FC Avtodor Vladikavkaz	34	(2)
- * Club domestic league appearances and goals

Alan Khristoforovich Zaseyev (Russian: Алан Христофорович Засеев; born 16 March 1982) is a former Russian football player.

Zaseyev made a single appearance in the Russian Premier League with FC Alania Vladikavkaz.

He represented Russia at the 1999 UEFA European Under-16 Championship.
