= Gabriel Ucar =

Swedish footballer

Personal information
- Date of birth: 12 March 1982 (age 44)
- Place of birth: Sweden
- Height: 1.74 m (5 ft 9 in)
- Position: Defender

Senior career*
Years	Team	Apps	(Gls)
2001–2004	Landskrona	85	(0)
2005–2006	Assyriska	20	(0)
2007	Östers IF	9	(0)
2008–2012	Ängelholms FF	69	(1)
2013	Prespa Birlik		

International career
	Sweden U21	9	(0)
- * Club domestic league appearances and goals

Gabriel Ucar (born 12 March 1982) is a Swedish former professional footballer who played as a defender.

Ucar grew up in Landskrona, a town in Scania, Sweden and became an own product for Landskrona BoIS. He was among the players who in 2001 got his club promoted from Superettan to the top Swedish league Allsvenskan. He left Landskrona BoIS for Assyriska FF in middle of the 2004 season.

He spent time on trial at Irish side Derry City in 2008.

Ucar has also represented the Sweden under-21 side, earning a total of 9 caps.
