= Šardice =

- Municipality
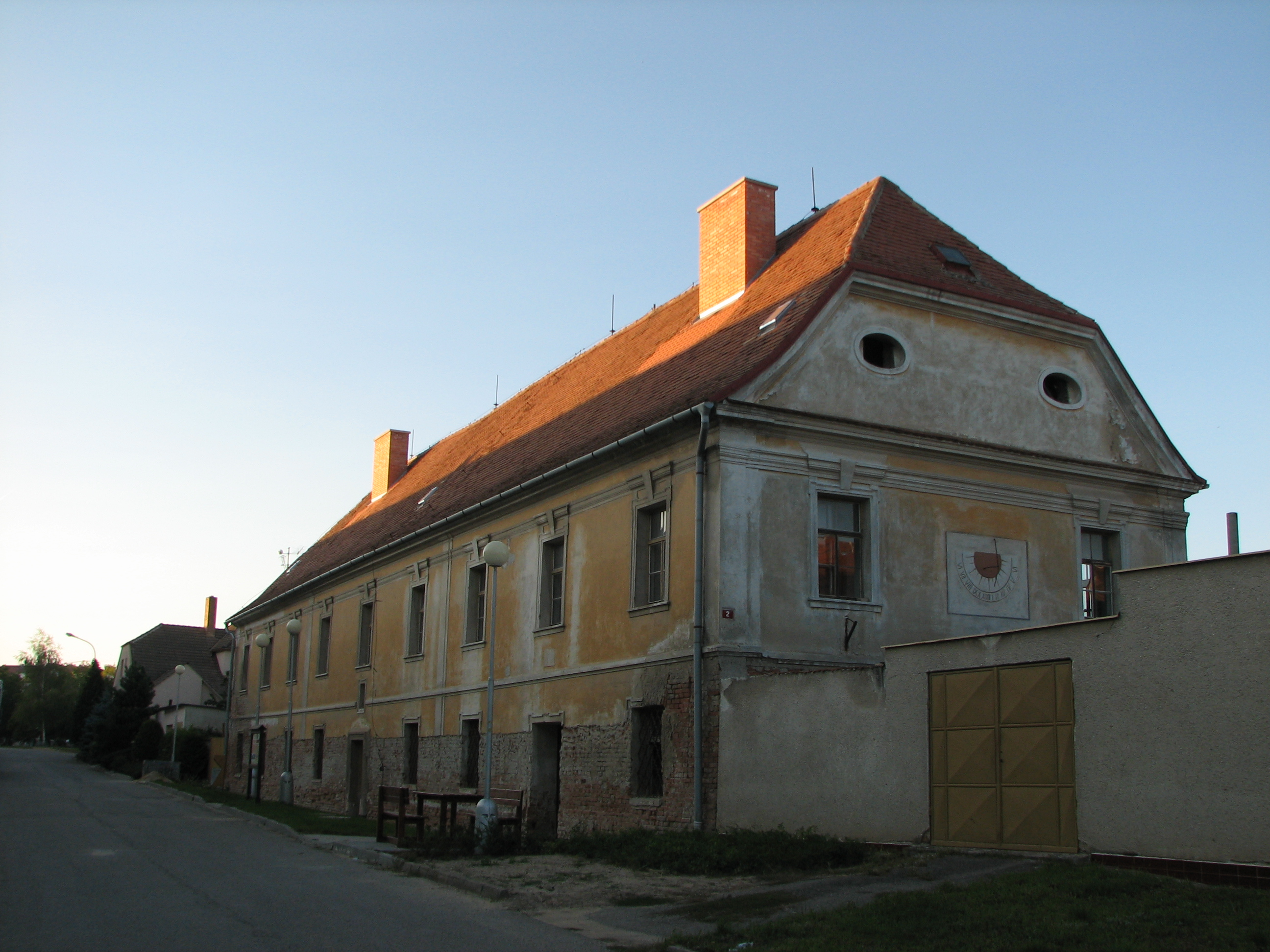
- Bishop's residence

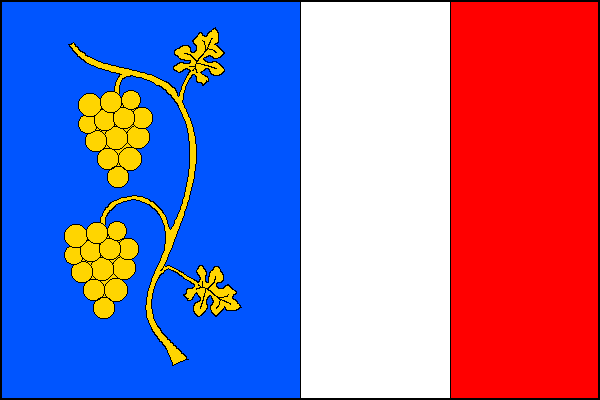
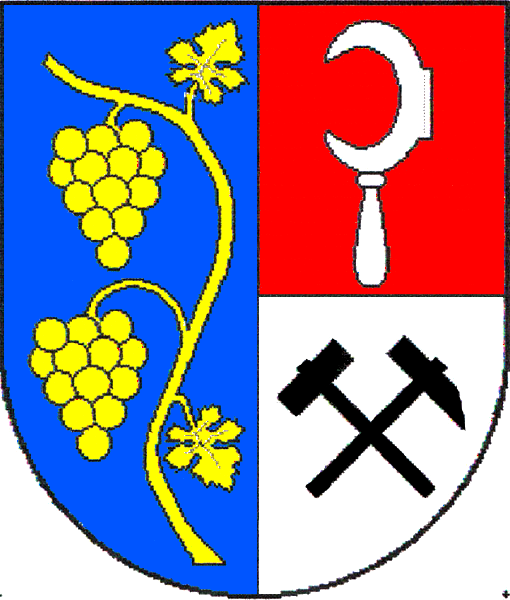
- Flag Coat of arms

- Location in the Czech Republic
- Coordinates: 48°57′51″N 17°1′41″E
- Country: Czech Republic
- Region: South Moravian
- District: Hodonín
- First mentioned: 1286

Area
  - Total: 17.29 km^{2} (6.68 sq mi)
- Elevation: 183 m (600 ft)

Population (2026-01-01)
  - Total: 2,162
  - Density: 125.0/km^{2} (323.9/sq mi)
- Time zone: UTC+1 (CET)
  - Summer (DST): UTC+2 (CEST)
- Postal code: 696 13
- Website: www.sardice.cz

Šardice is a municipality and village in Hodonín District in the South Moravian Region of the Czech Republic. It has about 2,200 inhabitants.

== Geography ==
Šardice is located about 14 kilometres (9 mi) north of Hodonín and 38 km (24 mi) southeast of Brno. It lies in the Kyjov Hills. The highest point is at 319 m (1,047 ft) above sea level. The stream Šardický potok flows through the municipality.

== History ==
The first written mention of Šardice is from 1286. In 1370, the village was acquired by the Augustinian monastery in Brno. Except for the years 1420–1446 and 1475–1492, when the village passed into the ownership of various nobles, it was a property of the monastery. From 1830 to 1993, Šardice was known for mining of lignite.

== Demographics ==
Historical population

| Year | Pop. | ±% |
|---|---|---|
| 1869 | 1,463 | — |
| 1880 | 1,561 | +6.7% |
| 1890 | 1,623 | +4.0% |
| 1900 | 1,744 | +7.5% |
| 1910 | 2,003 | +14.9% |

| Year | Pop. | ±% |
|---|---|---|
| 1921 | 2,096 | +4.6% |
| 1930 | 1,979 | −5.6% |
| 1950 | 1,920 | −3.0% |
| 1961 | 2,302 | +19.9% |
| 1970 | 2,303 | +0.0% |

| Year | Pop. | ±% |
|---|---|---|
| 1980 | 2,284 | −0.8% |
| 1991 | 2,116 | −7.4% |
| 2001 | 2,197 | +3.8% |
| 2011 | 2,225 | +1.3% |
| 2021 | 2,096 | −5.8% |

Source: Censuses

== Economy ==
Šardice is known for viticulture and winemaking. The municipality lies in the Slovácká wine subregion.

== Transport ==
There are no railways or major roads passing through the municipality.

== Sights ==
The main landmark of Šardice is the Church of Saint Michael the Archangel. It was built in the late Baroque style in 1754–1758, on the foundations of a Gothic church from the 13th century.
