= Vladimír Pončák =

Slovak footballer

Personal information
- Full name: Vladimír Pončák
- Date of birth: 19 June 1982 (age 44)
- Place of birth: Bratislava, Czechoslovakia
- Height: 1.83 m (6 ft 0 in)
- Position: Fullback

Youth career
- 1990–1999: Tatran Prešov

Senior career*
Years	Team	Apps	(Gls)
1999–2002	Inter Bratislava	8	(0)
2002–2005	Dynamo České Budějovice	66	(1)
2005–2006	→ Baumit Jablonec (loan)	19	(0)
2006–2007	→ Kladno (loan)	15	(0)
2007–2009	Spartak Trnava	36	(1)
2010–2011	Petržalka	40	(0)
2012–2020	Šamorín	155	(8)
- * Club domestic league appearances and goals as of 8 January 2020

Vladimír Pončák (born 19 June 1982) is a Slovak former football defender who last played for the II. liga club ŠTK 1914 Šamorín. He played 100 times in the Gambrinus liga, the top football league in the Czech Republic.
