= Mads Beierholm =

Danish footballer (born 1984)

Personal information
- Date of birth: 15 November 1984 (age 41)
- Place of birth: Jelling, Denmark
- Position: Midfielder

Senior career*
Years	Team	Apps	(Gls)
2001–2005	Vejle Boldklub		
2005–2007	SønderjyskE		
2007–2009	Fylkir		
2009	Odder IGF		
2009–2010	Middelfart Boldklub		

International career
	Denmark U16	3	(1)
	Denmark U17	14	(3)
	Denmark U18	1	(0)
	Denmark U19	15	(4)
	Denmark U20	4	(2)
- * Club domestic league appearances and goals as of 30 June 2020

Mads Beierholm (born 15 November 1984) is a Danish former professional footballer who played as a midfielder.

He held the record as the youngest goalscorer in Danish Superliga history, until Roony Bardghji beat that in November 2021.

== Career ==
=== Club career ===
Beierholm has played in the Danish Superliga for Vejle Boldklub and SønderjyskE, and has also played in Iceland for Fylkir.

=== International career ===
Beierholm represented Denmark at youth level from under-16 to under-20.
