= Jiří Koubský =

Czech footballer and coach (born 1982)

Personal information
- Date of birth: 5 August 1982 (age 44)
- Place of birth: Kyjov, Czechoslovakia
- Height: 1.95 m (6 ft 5 in)
- Position: Centre back

Team information
- Current team: FC Köniz (assistant coach)

Youth career
- 1987–1995: Jiskra Kyjov
- 1995–1996: Uherské Hradiště
- 1996–2000: Zlín

Senior career*
Years	Team	Apps	(Gls)
2000–2005	Zlín	54	(3)
2004	→ Sparta Prague (loan)	2	(1)
2005–2010	St. Gallen	130	(9)
2010–2011	Slavia Prague	12	(2)
2011–2012	Spartak Trnava	23	(1)
2013	Aarau	16	(1)
2013–2014	Wil	25	(1)
2014–2018	Köniz	76	(5)
2018–2019	Köniz II	7	(2)

International career
1998	Czech Republic U-16	7	(0)
1999–2000	Czech Republic U-17	13	(0)
2000–2001	Czech Republic U-18	12	(2)
2002	Czech Republic U-20	2	(0)
2002–2003	Czech Republic U-21	16	(4)

Managerial career
- 2018: Köniz II (assistant)
- 2019: Köniz (assistant)
- 2019–2020: Köniz II
- 2020–: Köniz (assistant)
- * Club domestic league appearances and goals

Jiří Koubský (born 5 August 1982) is a Czech football coach and a former defender. He is an assistant manager with the Swiss club Köniz.
