= Toni Hahto =

Finnish footballer (born 1982)

Personal information
- Date of birth: 7 April 1982 (age 44)
- Place of birth: Finland
- Height: 1.76 m (5 ft 9 1/2 in)
- Position: Defender

Team information
- Current team: Vaasan Palloseura
- Number: 11

Senior career*
Years	Team	Apps	(Gls)
2005–2010	Vaasan Palloseura	114	(6)
- * Club domestic league appearances and goals as of 9 September 2022

Toni Hahto (born 7 April 1982) is a retired Finnish footballer who represented Vaasan Palloseura of Veikkausliiga.
