= Fyodor Usov =

Russian footballer

Personal information
- Full name: Fyodor Veniaminovich Usov
- Date of birth: 30 March 1982 (age 44)
- Height: 1.80 m (5 ft 11 in)
- Position: Defender

Youth career
- Smena St. Petersburg

Senior career*
Years	Team	Apps	(Gls)
1999–2000	FC Zenit St. Petersburg	2	(0)
1999–2000	→ FC Zenit-d St. Petersburg (loan)	56	(1)
2001–2002	FC Zenit-2 St. Petersburg	53	(5)
2003	FC Svetogorets	35	(0)
2004	FC Lada Tolyatti	32	(1)
2006	FC Kolpino-INKON Kolpino		
2006	FC Zenit Penza	14	(1)
2007–2008	FC Kolpino-INKON Kolpino		
2008–2009	FC Trevis & VVK St. Petersburg		
- * Club domestic league appearances and goals

Fyodor Veniaminovich Usov (Russian: Фёдор Вениаминович Усов; born 30 March 1982) is a former Russian football player.

He represented Russia at the 1999 UEFA European Under-16 Championship.
