= Daniel Heidman =

Israeli footballer

Daniel Heidman דניאל היידמן
Personal information
- Date of birth: November 10, 1982 (age 43)
- Place of birth: Ra'anana, Israel
- Position: Midfielder

Youth career
- Hapoel Ra'anana
- Maccabi Tel Aviv

Senior career*
Years	Team	Apps	(Gls)
2001–2002	Maccabi Tel Aviv	2	(0)
2002–2003	Hapoel Kfar Saba	23	(0)
2003–2005	Beitar Jerusalem	39	(0)
2005–2006	Hapoel Petah Tikva	22	(0)
2006–2007	Hakoah Ramat Gan	16	(1)
2007–2008	Hapoel Petah Tikva	22	(0)
2008–2010	Hapoel Rishon Lezion	25	(4)
2010–2011	Hapoel Ashkelon	19	(0)

International career
1998–1999	Israel U16	12	(1)
2000	Israel U18	1	(1)
2001–2002	Israel U21	2	(0)
- * Club domestic league appearances and goals

Daniel Heidman (Hebrew: דניאל היידמן; born November 10, 1982) is a former Israeli professional football (soccer) player.
