= Hans Lindbom =

Swedish football manager

Personal information
- Date of birth: 12 February 1953 (age 73)
- Place of birth: Sweden

Senior career*
Years	Team	Apps	(Gls)
–1970	Tranås BoIS		
1971	Östers IF		
1971–1974	Åtvidabergs FF		
1975–1978	Jönköpings Södra IF		
1979	IS Halmia		
1980–1981	Huskvarna Södra		
1982–1983	Råsunda IS		

Managerial career
- 1984: Tranås BoIS
- 1985–1987: IK Tord
- 1988–1990: Tidaholms GoIF
- 1991–1992: IF Elfsborg
- 1993–1995: Tidaholms GoIF
- 2009–2011: Jönköpings Södra IF
- * Club domestic league appearances and goals

Hans Lindbom (born 12 February 1953) is a Swedish football manager. He has managed teams like Jönköpings Södra IF. and IF Elfborg
