= Vítor Silva (footballer, born 1982) =

Portuguese footballer

Personal information
- Full name: Vítor Manuel Andrade Bastos da Silva
- Date of birth: 24 May 1982 (age 44)
- Place of birth: Arrifana, Portugal
- Height: 1.80 m (5 ft 11 in)
- Position: Forward

Youth career
- 1992–1996: Arrifanense
- 1996–2001: Boavista
- 2001–2002: Torino
- 2001–2002: Lecco

Senior career*
| Years | Team | Apps | (Gls) |
| 2002–2004 | Porto B | 61 | (11) |
| 2004–2008 | Santa Clara | 87 | (6) |
| 2008–2009 | Gondomar | 20 | (2) |
| 2009–2010 | Chaves | 20 | (0) |
| 2010–2011 | Esmoriz | 25 | (3) |
| 2011–2012 | Espinho | 26 | (2) |
| 2012–2013 | Cinfães | 23 | (3) |
| 2013–2014 | Coimbrões | 18 | (0) |
| 2014–2015 | Sanjoanense | 13 | (0) |
| 2015 | Cucujães | 11 | (3) |
| 2015–2016 | Paivense | 30 | (9) |
| 2016–2017 | Bustelo | 20 | (3) |
| 2017–2018 | Arrifanense | | |

International career
| 2000 | Portugal U18 | 2 | (0) |
- * Club domestic league appearances and goals

Vítor Manuel Andrade Bastos da Silva (born 24 May 1982) is a Portuguese footballer who played as a forward.
