= Dariusz Zawadzki =

Polish footballer

Personal information
- Full name: Dariusz Zawadzki
- Date of birth: 18 June 1982 (age 44)
- Place of birth: Kraków, Poland
- Height: 1.80 m (5 ft 11 in)
- Position: Midfielder

Team information
- Current team: Garbarnia Kraków U19 (manager)

Senior career*
Years	Team	Apps	(Gls)
1999–2004	Wisła Kraków	0	(0)
2001	→ Arka Gdynia (loan)	4	(0)
2001–2002	→ ŁKS Łódź (loan)	17	(1)
2002	→ Proszowianka (loan)	15	(3)
2003	→ Cracovia (loan)	16	(0)
2004	Wisła Kraków II		
2004	Tłoki Gorzyce		
2005–2007	Kmita Zabierzów	29	(6)
2007–2008	Wisła Płock	21	(2)
2008	Kmita Zabierzów	17	(0)
2009	Sandecja Nowy Sącz	34	(7)
2010–2011	Pogoń Szczecin	26	(0)
2011–2012	Kolejarz Stróże	20	(0)
2012–2013	Limanovia Limanowa	23	(5)
2013–2014	Skra Częstochowa	16	(1)
2014	Limanovia Limanowa	9	(0)
2015	Sparta Kazimierza Wielka		
2016	Skawinka Skawina		
2016–2018	Sparta Kazimierza Wielka		
2018	Targowianka Targowisko	12	(1)
2019–2021	Nidzica Dobiesławice	20	(3)
2021–2023	Zielonka Wrząsowice	17	(2)

International career
1998–1999	Poland U16		
1999–2000	Poland U17		
2000–2001	Poland U18		

Managerial career
- 2023–2024: Garbarnia Kraków II
- 2024–2025: Garbarnia Kraków
- 2025–: Garbarnia Kraków U19
Medal record
Men's football
Representing Poland
UEFA European Under-18 Championship
Winner	2001 Finland
UEFA European Under-16 Championship
Runner-up	1999 Czech Republic
- * Club domestic league appearances and goals

Dariusz Zawadzki (born 18 June 1982) is a Polish former professional footballer who played as a midfielder. He currently manages Garbarnia Kraków's under-19 team.

== Club career ==
In January 2010, he joined Pogoń Szczecin. He was released from Pogoń on 10 June 2011.

In June 2011, he joined Kolejarz Stróże.

== Managerial statistics ==
As of match played 21 June 2025

Managerial record by team and tenure
Team	From	To	Record							
Team	From	To	G	W	D	L	GF	GA	GD	Win %
Garbarnia Kraków II	19 July 2023	10 August 2024	32	17	3	12	70	68	+2	53.13
Garbarnia Kraków (co-manager)	10 August 2024	30 June 2025	35	21	7	7	81	40	+41	60.00
Total			67	38	10	19	151	108	+43	56.72

== Honours ==
=== Player ===
Cracovia

- III liga, group IV: 2002–03

Kmita Zabierzów

- III liga, group IV: 2005–06

Limanovia Limanowa

- III liga Lesser Poland–Świętokrzyskie: 2012–13

Sparta Kazimierza Wielka

- IV liga Świętokrzyskie: 2014–15

Zielonka Wrząsowice

- Klasa A Myślenice: 2021–22

Poland U16

- UEFA European Under-16 Championship runner-up: 1999

Poland U18

- UEFA European Under-18 Championship: 2001

=== Managerial ===
Garbarnia Kraków

- V liga Lesser Poland West: 2024–25
