= Tomáš Dujka =

Czech footballer

Personal information
- Date of birth: 10 December 1982 (age 43)
- Place of birth: Czechoslovakia
- Height: 1.77 m (5 ft 10 in)
- Position: Midfielder

Senior career*
Years	Team	Apps	(Gls)
2000–2008	FC Tescoma Zlín	38	(0)
2003	→ FK AS Pardubice (loan)		
2005	→ SFC Opava (loan)	13	(0)
2006	→ FC Vysočina Jihlava (loan)		
2007	→ SFC Opava (loan)		

International career
2001	Czech Republic U18	4	(1)
2003	Czech Republic U21	2	(0)
- * Club domestic league appearances and goals

Tomáš Dujka (born 10 December 1982) is a retired professional Czech football player who played in the Czech First League for FC Tescoma Zlín and SFC Opava.
