= Adrian Olegov =

Bulgarian footballer

Personal information
- Full name: Adrian Ivanov Olegov
- Date of birth: 1 May 1985 (age 41)
- Place of birth: Pernik, Bulgaria
- Height: 1.79 m (5 ft 10 in)
- Position: Defender

Youth career
- Minyor Pernik
- CSKA Sofia

Senior career*
Years	Team	Apps	(Gls)
2004–2005	CSKA Sofia	3	(0)
2006	Conegliano German	15	(1)
2006–2007	Vihar Gorublyane	24	(2)
2007–2008	Minyor Pernik	29	(6)
2008–2009	Chavdar Etropole	25	(2)
2009–2011	Minyor Pernik	44	(2)
2012	Neftochimic Burgas	9	(1)
2012	Ħamrun Spartans	16	(0)
2013–2017	Minyor Pernik	25	(2)
- * Club domestic league appearances and goals

Adrian Olegov (Bulgarian: Адриан Олегов; born 1 May 1985 in Pernik) is a Bulgarian former football defender.
