= Martin Hudec (footballer) =

Czech footballer (born 1982)

Personal information
- Full name: Martin Hudec
- Date of birth: 15 April 1982 (age 44)
- Place of birth: Znojmo, Czechoslovakia
- Height: 1.85 m (6 ft 1 in)
- Position: Defender

Youth career
- 1988–1998: VTJ Znojmo
- 1998–2001: Sigma Olomouc

Senior career*
Years	Team	Apps	(Gls)
2001–2010	Sigma Olomouc	131	(15)
2009–2010	→ TuS Koblenz (loan)	4	(0)
2010	→ FC Zbrojovka Brno (loan)	9	(0)
2011	Karlsruher SC	2	(0)
2011–	VfL Osnabrück	34	(4)

International career^{‡}
2003	Czech Republic U-21	3	(0)
- * Club domestic league appearances and goals as of 13 December 2012 ‡ National team caps and goals as of 13 December 2012

Martin Hudec (born 15 April 1982) is a Czech football player who currently plays for VfL Osnabrück.

== Career ==
His career started in the city of Znojmo in the club VTJ Znojmo. After successive loans to TuS Koblenz and FC Zbrojovka Brno in 2009 and 2010 respectively, he transferred to Karlsruher SC.
