= Petr Čoupek =

Czech footballer (born 1982)

Personal information
- Date of birth: 10 May 1982 (age 44)
- Place of birth: Brno, Czechoslovakia
- Height: 1.79 m (5 ft 10 in)
- Position: Defender

Youth career
- 1989–1999: FC Brno

Senior career*
Years	Team	Apps	(Gls)
1999–2003	Bayer Leverkusen II	55	(1)
2003–2005	1. FC Slovácko	41	(3)
2005–2008	FC Baník Ostrava	57	(1)
2008–2010	1. FC Brno	30	(0)
2011	FC Slovan Rosice	14	(3)
2011–2012	1. HFK Olomouc	9	(0)

International career^{‡}
1998	Czech Republic U15	1	(0)
1998–1999	Czech Republic U16	15	(3)
2000–2001	Czech Republic U18	11	(1)
2002	Czech Republic U20	2	(0)
2002–2003	Czech Republic U21	4	(0)
- * Club domestic league appearances and goals ‡ National team caps and goals as of 5 September 2014

Petr Čoupek (born 10 May 1982 in Brno) is a Czech former football defender who played for several Gambrinus liga teams. He has represented his country at under-21 level.
