= Jorge Perona =

Spanish footballer

Personal information
- Full name: Jorge Perona García
- Date of birth: 1 April 1982 (age 44)
- Place of birth: Enguera, Spain
- Height: 1.76 m (5 ft 9 1/2 in)
- Position: Forward

Team information
- Current team: CF Lorca Deportiva (manager)

Youth career
- Valencia
- 1998–2000: Barcelona

Senior career*
Years	Team	Apps	(Gls)
2000–2001	Barcelona C	31	(18)
2000–2003	Barcelona B	47	(10)
2003–2004	Hércules	35	(10)
2004–2006	Lorca Deportiva CF	61	(19)
2006–2007	Levante B	36	(10)
2007–2008	Alcoyano	36	(10)
2008–2009	Lorca Deportiva CF	41	(9)
2009–2010	Sangonera	22	(11)
2010–2011	Oviedo	48	(15)
2011–2012	Tenerife	41	(16)
2012–2013	Cartagena	33	(7)
2013–2014	Huracán Valencia	20	(5)
2014–2015	Alcoyano	10	(0)
2015	Eldense	17	(0)
2015–2017	Jumilla	63	(7)
Total		541	(147)

International career
1998–1999	Spain U16	9	(8)
1999	Spain U17	3	(0)
2000–2001	Spain U18	12	(9)

Managerial career
- 2019–2021: Salamanca (assistant)
- 2021–2022: Archena Sport
- 2022–2023: Racing Murcia
- 2023–: CF Lorca Deportiva
Medal record
Representing Spain
UEFA European Under-16 Championship
Winner	1999 Czech Republic
- * Club domestic league appearances and goals

Jorge Perona García (born 1 April 1982 in Enguera, Valencian Community) is a Spanish former professional footballer who played as a forward, and is the current manager of CF Lorca Deportiva.

== Honours ==
Spain U16

- UEFA European Under-16 Championship: 1999
