= Samuel Lavan =

Israeli-Belgian footballer

Samuel Lavan שמואל לבן
Personal information
- Full name: Samuel Lavan
- Date of birth: January 21, 1982 (age 44)
- Place of birth: Jerusalem, Israel
- Position: Defender

Youth career
- 1995–1997: Beerschot
- 1997–1999: Lierse

Senior career*
Years	Team	Apps	(Gls)
2003–2004	Eendracht Aalst	9	(0)
2008–2009	Beitar Jerusalem	8	(0)
2002–2004	Deinze	38	(4)
2003	Roeselare	25	(0)
2000–2002	R. Antwerp	22	(3)
2005–2007	K. Berchem Sport	22	(2)
Total		124	(9)

International career
1998–1999	Israel U16	8	(1)
2003	Israel U21	1	(0)
- * Club domestic league appearances and goals

Shmuel lavan (Hebrew: שמואל לבן; born January 21, 1982) is an Israeli former footballer who played as a defender.
