= Martin Knakal =

Czech footballer (born 1984)

Personal information
- Date of birth: 17 April 1984 (age 42)
- Place of birth: Czechoslovakia
- Height: 1.87 m (6 ft 2 in)
- Position: Defender

Team information
- Current team: FK Baník Sokolov
- Number: 4

Senior career*
Years	Team	Apps	(Gls)
2004–2007	FC Viktoria Plzeň	41	(1)
2007	Xanthi		
2007	SK Sigma Olomouc	7	(0)
2008	→ Bohemians 1905 (loan)	6	(0)
2008–2009	1. FK Příbram	3	(0)
2009–2012	FK Baník Most		
2012	→ TJ Jiskra Domažlice (loan)		
2012–	FK Baník Sokolov	5	(0)

International career
2005–2007	Czech Republic U21	8	(1)
- * Club domestic league appearances and goals as of 31 December 2012

Martin Knakal (born 17 April 1984) is a Czech football defender, currently playing for FK Baník Sokolov. He made over 50 appearances in the Gambrinus liga. He played international football at youth level for his country including eight matches and one goal for Czech Republic U21.
