= Henri Scheweleff =

Finnish footballer (born 1983)

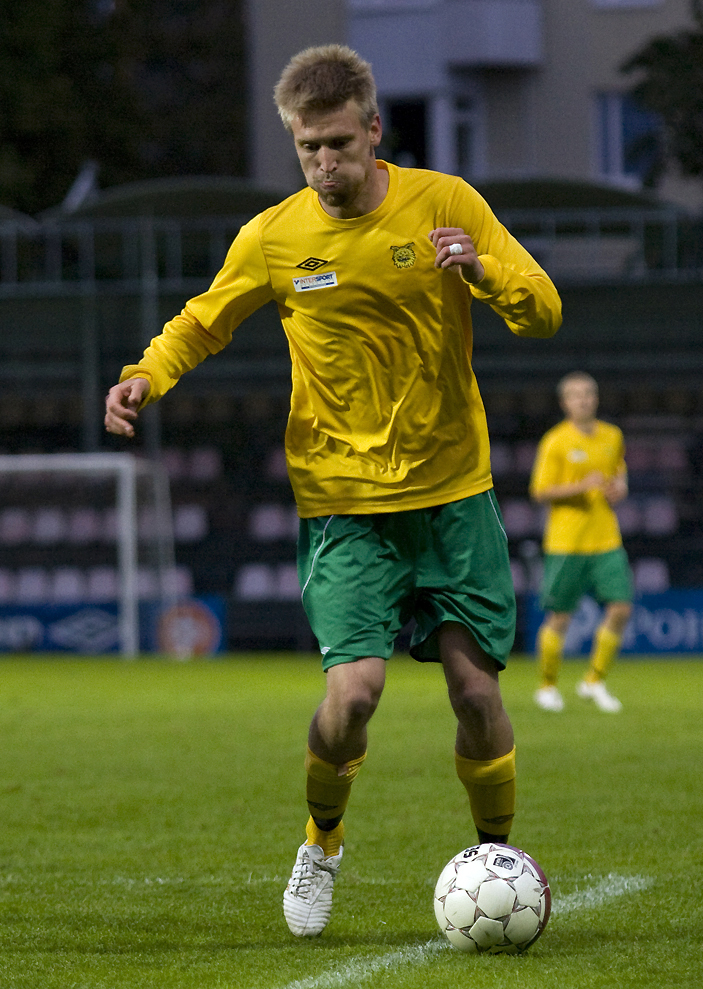
- Henri Scheweleff (2010)

Personal information
- Date of birth: 15 April 1983 (age 43)
- Place of birth: Vaasa, Finland
- Height: 1.83 m (6 ft 0 in)
- Position: Midfielder

Senior career*
Years	Team	Apps	(Gls)
2003–2005	Tampere United	61	(11)
2005–2006	Örgryte IS	12	(0)
2007	VPS	20	(3)
2008–2009	Tampere United	24	(1)
2010–2012	Ilves	40	(12)

International career
2004–2005	Finland	3	(0)
- * Club domestic league appearances and goals as of 2 May 2013

Henri Scheweleff (born 15 April 1983) is a retired Finnish football player, who played as a midfielder. He has previously played for Vaasan Palloseura, Örgryte IS and Tampere United of the Finnish Veikkausliiga. He has also represented the Finland national football team.

== Career statistics ==
As of 1 September 2024.

Appearances and goals by club, season and competition
Club	Season	League			Cup (Note: Includes Suomen Cup)		League cup		Europe		Total	
Club	Season	Division	Apps	Goals	Apps	Goals	Apps	Goals	Apps	Goals	Apps	Goals
Kiisto	2000	Kakkonen	18	13	–		–		–		18	13
VPS	2001	Veikkausliiga	18	8	–		–		–		18	8
VPS	2002	Veikkausliiga	17	5	–		–		–		17	5
VPS	Total		35	13	0	0	0	0	0	0	35	13
Tampere United	2003	Veikkausliiga	26	1	–		–		6 (Note: Appearances in UEFA Intertoto Cup)	1	32	2
Tampere United	2004	Veikkausliiga	18	4	–		–		1	1	19	5
Tampere United	2005	Veikkausliiga	17	6	–		–		5	0	22	6
Tampere United	Total		61	11	0	0	0	0	12	2	73	13
Örgryte	2005	Allsvenskan	4	0	–		–		–		4	0
Örgryte	2006	Allsvenskan	8	0	–		–		–		8	0
Örgryte	2007	Superettan	1	0	–		–		–		1	0
Örgryte	Total		13	0	0	0	0	0	0	0	13	0
VPS	2007	Veikkausliiga	20	3	–		–		–		20	3
TPV	2008	Ykkönen	3	0	–		–		–		3	0
Tampere United	2008	Veikkausliiga	0	0	1	0	–		–		1	0
Tampere United	2009	Veikkausliiga	25	1	4	0	5	0	–		34	1
Tampere United	Total		25	1	5	0	5	0	0	0	35	1
Ilves	2010	Kakkonen	25	8	–		–		–		25	8
Ilves	2011	Kakkonen	22	7	–		–		–		22	7
Ilves	2012	Kakkonen	16	5	–		–		–		16	5
Ilves	Total		63	20	0	0	0	0	0	0	63	20
Career total			248	61	5	0	5	0	12	2	270	63
