= 1999 FIFA U-17 World Championship squads =

== Group A ==
=== New Zealand ===
Head Coach: (England) Kevin Fallon

No.	Pos.	Player	Date of birth (age)	Caps	Club
1	GK	Sacha Nathu	26 April 1982 (aged 17)		(New Zealand) Wellington JFA
2	DF	Julius Kolk	18 March 1982 (aged 17)		(New Zealand) Nelson
3	DF	Sanjay Singh	4 June 1982 (aged 17)		(New Zealand) Taranaki
4	DF	David Rayner	18 March 1982 (aged 17)		(New Zealand) Bay of Plenty
5	DF	Tony Lochhead	12 January 1982 (aged 17)		(New Zealand) Bay of Plenty
6	DF	Cameron Knowles	11 October 1982 (aged 17)		(New Zealand) North Harbour JFA
7	MF	Dave Mulligan	24 March 1982 (aged 17)		(England) Barnsley
8	MF	Jeremy Christie	22 May 1983 (aged 16)		(New Zealand) Northland
9	FW	James Pritchett	1 July 1982 (aged 17)		(New Zealand) Auckland JFA
10	FW	Allan Pearce	7 April 1983 (aged 16)		(New Zealand) Mana JFA
11	FW	Brent Fisher	6 July 1983 (aged 16)		(New Zealand) Canterbury United
12	MF	Steve Turner	30 June 1982 (aged 17)		(New Zealand) Auckland JFA
13	MF	Daniel Trent	12 October 1982 (aged 17)		(New Zealand) Counties
14	MF	Neil Jones	16 February 1982 (aged 17)		(New Zealand) North Harbour JFA
15	MF	Ricky Hill	30 April 1982 (aged 17)		(New Zealand) Auckland JFA
16	MF	Karl Budgen	13 February 1982 (aged 17)		(New Zealand) Waikato
17	FW	Sebastián Pérez	4 February 1982 (aged 17)		(New Zealand) Auckland JFA
18	GK	Gary Bridle	25 March 1982 (aged 17)		(New Zealand) Hawkes Bay

=== United States ===
Head Coach: (United States) John Ellinger

No.	Pos.	Player	Date of birth (age)	Caps	Club
1	GK	D. J. Countess	9 January 1982 (aged 17)		(United States) San Juan
2	DF	Kellen Kalso	16 January 1982 (aged 17)		(United States) Vardar III
3	MF	DaMarcus Beasley	24 May 1982 (aged 17)		(United States) Los Angeles Galaxy
4	MF	Nelson Akwari	4 February 1982 (aged 17)		(United States) Texans
5	DF	Alex Yi	27 February 1982 (aged 17)		(United States) FC Potomac
6	DF	Gregory Martin	5 January 1982 (aged 17)		(United States) Dallas Comets
7	MF	Kenny Cutler	8 March 1982 (aged 17)		(United States) Richmond Strikers
8	MF	Bryan Jackson	14 April 1982 (aged 17)		(United States) Claremont Stars
9	MF	Adolfo Gregorio	1 October 1982 (aged 17)		(United States) Turlock Tornadoes
10	FW	Landon Donovan	4 March 1982 (aged 17)		(Germany) Bayer Leverkusen
11	FW	Bobby Convey	27 May 1983 (aged 16)		(United States) Coppa
12	MF	Raúl Palomares	6 February 1983 (aged 16)		(Germany) 1. FC Kaiserslautern
13	FW	Abe Thompson	12 January 1982 (aged 17)		(United States) Braddock Warhawks
14	DF	Oguchi Onyewu	13 May 1982 (aged 17)		(United States) FC Potomac
15	MF	Kyle Beckerman	23 April 1982 (aged 17)		(United States) Commack United
16	FW	Jordan Cila	11 April 1982 (aged 17)		(United States) Commack United
17	DF	Seth Trembly	21 March 1982 (aged 17)		(United States) Colorado Rapids
18	GK	Steve Cronin	28 May 1983 (aged 16)		(United States) San Juan

=== Uruguay ===
Head Coach: (Uruguay) Víctor Púa

No.	Pos.	Player	Date of birth (age)	Caps	Club
1	GK	Martín Silva	25 March 1983 (aged 16)		(Uruguay) Defensor Sporting
2	DF	Williams Martínez	18 December 1982 (aged 16)		(Uruguay) Defensor Sporting
3	DF	Alvaro Meneses	26 May 1982 (aged 17)		(Uruguay) Nacional
4	DF	Rodolfo Pavia	9 April 1982 (aged 17)		(Uruguay) Nacional
5	MF	Carlos Jacques	11 February 1982 (aged 17)		(Uruguay) Peñarol
6	DF	Miguel Lapolla	27 January 1982 (aged 17)		(Uruguay) Danubio
7	MF	Sebastián Álvarez	29 January 1982 (aged 17)		(Uruguay) Peñarol
8	MF	Javier Garcia	30 September 1982 (aged 17)		(Uruguay) Defensor Sporting
9	FW	Mario Leguizamón	7 July 1982 (aged 17)		(Uruguay) Peñarol
10	MF	Rubén Olivera	4 May 1983 (aged 16)		(Uruguay) Danubio
11	FW	Horacio Peralta	3 June 1982 (aged 17)		(Uruguay) Danubio
12	GK	Fernando Rodríguez	2 January 1983 (aged 16)		(Uruguay) Defensor Sporting
13	DF	Gonzalo Novegil	14 October 1982 (aged 17)		(Uruguay) Danubio
14	DF	Washington Alonso	24 September 1982 (aged 17)		(Uruguay) Cerro
15	DF	Ignacio Portillo	3 August 1982 (aged 17)		(Uruguay) Wanderers
16	MF	Pablo Munhoz	31 August 1982 (aged 17)		(Uruguay) Defensor Sporting
17	FW	Sergio Leal	25 September 1982 (aged 17)		(Uruguay) Peñarol
18	MF	Peter Vera	8 December 1982 (aged 16)		(Uruguay) Nacional

=== Poland ===
Head Coach: (Poland) Michał Globisz

No.	Pos.	Player	Date of birth (age)	Caps	Club
1	GK	Tomasz Kuszczak	20 March 1982 (aged 17)		(Poland) Śląsk Wrocław
2	DF	Marcin Rogalski	15 July 1982 (aged 17)		(Poland) Halex Olsztyn
3	DF	Adrian Napierała	16 February 1982 (aged 17)		(Poland) MSP Szamotuły
4	DF	Tomasz Wisio	20 January 1982 (aged 17)		(Poland) Zagłębie Lubin
5	DF	Wojciech Szymanek	1 March 1982 (aged 17)		(Poland) Polonia Warszawa
6	MF	Wojciech Łobodziński	20 October 1982 (aged 17)		(Poland) Halex Olsztyn
7	DF	Łukasz Nawotczyński	30 March 1982 (aged 17)		(Poland) Lechia Gdańsk
8	MF	Dariusz Zawadzki	18 June 1982 (aged 17)		(Poland) Wisła Kraków
9	MF	Łukasz Madej	14 April 1982 (aged 17)		(Poland) ŁKS Łódź
10	FW	Łukasz Mierzejewski	31 August 1982 (aged 17)		(Poland) Lechia Gdańsk
11	FW	Radosław Matusiak	1 January 1982 (aged 17)		(Poland) ŁKS Łódź
12	GK	Paweł Kapsa	24 July 1982 (aged 17)		(Poland) Ostrowiec
13	MF	Piotr Brożek	21 April 1983 (aged 16)		(Poland) Wisła Kraków
14	MF	Sebastian Mila	10 July 1982 (aged 17)		(Poland) Lechia Gdańsk
15	MF	Robert Sierant	8 July 1982 (aged 17)		(Poland) ŁKS Łódź
16	FW	Michał Janicki	29 September 1982 (aged 17)		(Poland) Pogoń Szczecin
17	DF	Kamil Kuzera	11 March 1983 (aged 16)		(Poland) Wisła Kraków
18	FW	Paweł Brożek	21 April 1983 (aged 16)		(Poland) Wisła Kraków

== Group B ==
=== Ghana ===
Head Coach: (Ghana) Cecil Jones Attuquayefio

No.	Pos.	Player	Date of birth (age)	Caps	Club
1	GK	Maxwell Owusu	7 September 1982 (aged 17)		(Ghana) Hasaacas
2	DF	Emmanuel Nkrumah	20 December 1982 (aged 16)		(Ghana) All Blacks
3	DF	Lawrence Kainya	10 January 1982 (aged 17)		(Ghana) Neoplan Stars
4	DF	Michael Essien	3 December 1982 (aged 16)		(Ghana) Liberty Professionals
5	DF	Michael Donkor	24 January 1982 (aged 17)		(Ghana) De Gaulle Stars
6	MF	Kwame Pele Frimpong	24 September 1983 (aged 16)		(Ghana) Liberty Professionals
7	DF	Ibrahim Atiku	20 May 1986 (aged 13)		(Ghana) Cowlane Babies
8	MF	Michael Osei	22 September 1982 (aged 17)		(Ghana) Mysterious Dwarfs
9	MF	Razak Pimpong	30 December 1982 (aged 16)		(Ghana) Great Olympics
10	MF	Nathaniel Lamptey	7 July 1983 (aged 16)		(Ghana) Stay Cool
11	FW	Seth Ablade	30 April 1983 (aged 16)		(Ghana) Accra Angels Soccer Academy
12	DF	Ibrahim Abdul Razak	18 April 1983 (aged 16)		(Nigeria) Mighty Jets
13	MF	Anthony Obodai	6 August 1982 (aged 17)		(Ghana) Liberty Professionals
14	DF	Stephen Tetteh	14 April 1982 (aged 17)		(Ghana) Mighty Jets
15	FW	Ishmael Addo	30 July 1982 (aged 17)		(Ghana) Hearts of Oak
16	GK	Sumaila Abdallah	17 July 1982 (aged 17)		(Ghana) Dawu Youngstars
17	FW	Stephen Oduro	13 April 1983 (aged 16)		(Ghana) Real Tamale United
18	DF	Bernard Dong Bortey	22 September 1982 (aged 17)		(Ghana) Ghapoha Readers

=== Spain ===
Head Coach: (Spain) Juan Santisteban

No.	Pos.	Player	Date of birth (age)	Caps	Club
1	GK	Pepe Reina	31 August 1982 (aged 17)		(Spain) Barcelona
2	DF	Juan Carlos Duque	26 January 1982 (aged 17)		(Spain) Real Madrid
3	DF	Enrique Corrales	1 March 1982 (aged 17)		(Spain) Real Madrid
4	MF	Mikel Arteta	26 March 1982 (aged 17)		(Spain) Barcelona
5	DF	Mario	2 February 1982 (aged 17)		(Spain) Amorós
6	DF	Rubén	19 January 1982 (aged 17)		(Spain) Real Madrid
7	DF	Nano	20 April 1982 (aged 17)		(Spain) Barcelona
8	MF	Líbero Parri	18 January 1982 (aged 17)		(Spain) Villarreal
9	MF	Elías	16 February 1982 (aged 17)		(Spain) Amorós
10	MF	Ernesto	5 March 1982 (aged 17)		(Spain) Real Madrid
11	MF	Albert Crusat	13 May 1982 (aged 17)		(Spain) Espanyol
12	DF	Diego Alegre	22 March 1982 (aged 17)		(Spain) Valencia
13	GK	David Relaño	22 April 1982 (aged 17)		(Spain) Betis
14	FW	Jonathan Aspas	28 February 1982 (aged 17)		(Spain) Celta Vigo
15	FW	Aitor Gómez	6 May 1982 (aged 17)		(Spain) Atlético Madrid
16	FW	Jorge Perona	1 April 1982 (aged 17)		(Spain) Barcelona
17	FW	Nacho	6 November 1982 (aged 17)		(Spain) Racing Santander
18	DF	Fernando Navarro	25 June 1982 (aged 17)		(Spain) Barcelona

=== Mexico ===
Head Coach: (Mexico) José Luís Real Casillas

No.	Pos.	Player	Date of birth (age)	Caps	Club
1	GK	Adolfo Cabrera	18 May 1982 (aged 17)		(Mexico) Guadalajara
2	DF	Félix Grijalva	6 June 1982 (aged 17)		(Mexico) Atlante
3	DF	Julio Bracamontes	9 September 1982 (aged 17)		(Mexico) Guadalajara
4	DF	Juan Manuel Azuara	21 March 1982 (aged 17)		(Mexico) Tigres
5	DF	Mario Pérez	17 June 1982 (aged 17)		(Mexico) Necaxa
6	DF	Ernesto María	22 February 1982 (aged 17)		(Mexico) Atlas
7	FW	Héctor Vallejo	28 March 1982 (aged 17)		(Mexico) Monterrey
8	MF	Edgar López	20 January 1982 (aged 17)		(Mexico) Cruz Azul
9	FW	Juan Estrada	18 May 1982 (aged 17)		(Mexico) Cruz Azul
10	MF	Ricardo Sánchez	27 May 1982 (aged 17)		(Mexico) Atlas
11	FW	Omar Aguayo	8 April 1982 (aged 17)		(Mexico) Guadalajara
12	GK	Cirilo Saucedo	5 January 1982 (aged 17)		(Mexico) León
13	MF	Aarón Galindo	8 May 1982 (aged 17)		(Mexico) Cruz Azul
14	FW	Gerardo Hernández	20 April 1982 (aged 17)		(Mexico) Pumas UNAM
15	FW	Gerardo Baca	13 January 1982 (aged 17)		(Mexico) Atlante
16	FW	Gustavo Ramírez	20 September 1982 (aged 17)		(Mexico) Necaxa
17	DF	Julio Elías	21 August 1982 (aged 17)		(Mexico) Cruz Azul
18	FW	Yared Yañez	2 April 1982 (aged 17)		(Mexico) Toros Neza

=== Thailand ===
Head Coach: (Thailand) Somchad Yimsiri

No.	Pos.	Player	Date of birth (age)	Caps	Club
1	GK	Intharat Apinyakool	30 May 1982 (aged 17)		(Thailand) Bangkok Christian College
2	DF	Suree Sukha	27 July 1982 (aged 17)		(Thailand) Assumption College Sriracha
3	DF	Pimponkan Sopon	8 April 1983 (aged 16)		(Thailand) Assumption College Sriracha
4	DF	Kraikiat Beadtaku	26 January 1982 (aged 17)		(Thailand) Suphanburi Sports College
5	DF	Nontapan Jeansatawong	9 February 1982 (aged 17)		(Thailand) Suphanburi Sports College
6	DF	Wasan Sungkpurn	18 February 1982 (aged 17)		(Thailand) Assumption College Bangkok
7	DF	Kittikun Suwannatri	3 March 1983 (aged 16)		(Thailand) Triam Udom Suksa School
8	DF	Songsak Chaisamak	10 July 1983 (aged 16)		(Thailand) Assumption College Sriracha
9	FW	Suriya Amatawech	28 January 1982 (aged 17)		(Thailand) Bangkok Christian College
10	FW	Teeratep Winothai	16 February 1985 (aged 14)		(Thailand) Bangkok Christian College
11	FW	Preecha Pinpradub	2 January 1982 (aged 17)		(Thailand) Suphanburi Sports College
12	DF	Nattaporn Phanrit	11 January 1982 (aged 17)		(Thailand) Assumption College Sriracha
13	DF	Udorn Pimpak	7 February 1982 (aged 17)		(Thailand) Assumption College Sriracha
14	MF	Theerayut Duangpimy	20 November 1982 (aged 16)		(Thailand) Wat Suthiwararam School
15	MF	Sakda Joemdee	7 April 1982 (aged 17)		(Thailand) Suankularb Wittayalai School
16	MF	Pichitphong Choeichiu	28 August 1982 (aged 17)		(Thailand) Suphanburi Sports College
17	MF	Praiwet Wanna	23 May 1983 (aged 16)		(Thailand) Assumption College Sriracha
18	GK	Kosin Hathairattanakool	23 March 1982 (aged 17)		(Thailand) Assumption College Sriracha

== Group C ==
=== Brazil ===
Head Coach: (Brazil) Carlos César Ramos

No.	Pos.	Player	Date of birth (age)	Caps	Club
1	GK	Rubinho	4 August 1982 (aged 17)		(Brazil) Corinthians
2	DF	Bruno Leite	11 January 1982 (aged 17)		(Brazil) Vasco da Gama
3	DF	Marquinhos	21 October 1982 (aged 17)		(Brazil) Corinthians
4	DF	Ricardo	25 February 1982 (aged 17)		(Brazil) Vasco da Gama
5	MF	Eduardo Costa	23 September 1982 (aged 17)		(Brazil) Grêmio
6	MF	Anderson	10 January 1983 (aged 16)		(Brazil) Flamengo
7	MF	Léo Lima	14 January 1982 (aged 17)		(Brazil) Madureira
8	MF	Walker	15 February 1982 (aged 17)		(Netherlands) Ajax
9	FW	Souza	4 March 1982 (aged 17)		(Brazil) Madureira
10	MF	Cacá	9 October 1982 (aged 17)		(Brazil) Atlético Mineiro
11	FW	Leandro Alves	26 February 1982 (aged 17)		(Brazil) São Paulo
12	GK	Diego Cavalieri	1 December 1982 (aged 16)		(Brazil) Palmeiras
13	DF	Carlinhos	23 June 1983 (aged 16)		(Brazil) Vitória
14	DF	Matheus	5 April 1982 (aged 17)		(Brazil) Grêmio
15	MF	Wellington	23 January 1982 (aged 17)		(Brazil) Corinthians
16	FW	Léo Macaé	28 March 1983 (aged 16)		(Brazil) Vasco da Gama
17	MF	Andrezinho	30 July 1983 (aged 16)		(Brazil) Flamengo
18	FW	Adriano	17 February 1982 (aged 17)		(Brazil) Flamengo

=== Australia ===
Head Coach: (Australia) Les Scheinflug

No.	Pos.	Player	Date of birth (age)	Caps	Club
1	GK	Jess Kedwell-Vanstrattan	19 July 1982 (aged 17)		(Australia) Northern Spirit
2	DF	Shane Lockhart	26 September 1982 (aged 17)		(Australia) NSW Academy
3	DF	Shane Cansdell-Sherriff	20 November 1982 (aged 16)		(England) Leeds United
4	DF	Aaron Goulding	29 April 1982 (aged 17)		South Australia Institute of Sport
5	DF	Adrian Madaschi	11 July 1982 (aged 17)		(Italy) Atalanta
6	DF	Mark Byrnes	8 February 1982 (aged 17)		(Australia) Parramatta Power
7	MF	Jade North	7 January 1982 (aged 17)		(Australia) Australian Institute of Sport
8	MF	Louis Brain	9 May 1982 (aged 17)		(Australia) Adelaide Force
9	FW	Joe Di Iorio	8 April 1982 (aged 17)		(Germany) Werder Bremen
10	MF	Lucas Pantelis	12 March 1982 (aged 17)		(Australia) Australian Institute of Sport
11	FW	Scott McDonald	21 August 1983 (aged 16)		(Australia) Victoria Institute of Sport
12	FW	Joshua Kennedy	20 August 1982 (aged 17)		(Australia) Australian Institute of Sport
13	DF	Iain Fyfe	3 April 1982 (aged 17)		South Australia Institute of Sport
14	MF	Bradley Groves	29 January 1982 (aged 17)		(England) Leeds United
15	MF	Anthony Doumanis	1 February 1982 (aged 17)		(Australia) NSW Academy
16	MF	Wayne Srhoj	23 March 1982 (aged 17)		(Australia) Australian Institute of Sport
17	MF	Dylan Macallister	17 May 1982 (aged 17)		(Australia) Sydney Olympic
18	GK	Matthew Milošević	29 October 1982 (aged 17)		South Australia Institute of Sport

=== Mali ===
Head Coach: (Mali) Fanyery Diarra

No.	Pos.	Player	Date of birth (age)	Caps	Club
1	GK	Cheick Bathily	10 October 1982 (aged 17)		(Mali) Onze Créateurs
2	DF	Mintou Doucouré	19 July 1982 (aged 17)		(Mali) CSK
3	MF	Sidi Diop	28 December 1982 (aged 16)		(Mali) Onze Créateurs
4	DF	Ousmane Diakité	4 March 1982 (aged 17)		(Mali) CSK
5	DF	Bamba Sylla	17 February 1982 (aged 17)		(Mali) Djoliba AC
6	DF	Dalla Diallo	3 March 1982 (aged 17)		(Mali) CSK
7	MF	Amadou Diallo	16 October 1982 (aged 17)		(Mali) Djoliba AC
8	MF	Djibril Sidibé	23 March 1982 (aged 17)		(France) AS Monaco
9	FW	Idrissa Koné	20 June 1982 (aged 17)		(Mali) Stade Malien
10	MF	Abdoul Traoré	24 March 1982 (aged 17)		(Mali) Djoliba AC
11	FW	Mamadou Diallo	17 April 1982 (aged 17)		(Mali) CSK
12	FW	Mohamed Sidibé	17 May 1983 (aged 16)		(Mali) CSK
13	FW	Abdoulaye Diaby	25 November 1982 (aged 16)		(Mali) Djoliba AC
14	FW	Mamadou Diawara	25 May 1982 (aged 17)		(Mali) CSK
15	FW	Kalilou Doumbia	25 January 1982 (aged 17)		(Mali) Cercle Olympique
16	GK	Youssouf Simpara	14 January 1982 (aged 17)		(Mali) CSK
17	FW	Koly Kanté	11 November 1982 (aged 16)		(France) Angoulême
18	DF	Souleymane Diamouténé	30 January 1983 (aged 16)		(Mali) Tata National

=== Germany ===
Head Coach: (Germany) Erich Rutemoeller

No.	Pos.	Player	Date of birth (age)	Caps	Club
1	GK	Jan Schlösser	27 September 1982 (aged 17)		(Germany) Bayern Munich
2	DF	Torsten Reuter	15 September 1982 (aged 17)		(Germany) 1. FC Kaiserslautern
3	MF	Lars Finke	25 August 1982 (aged 17)		(Germany) Hertha BSC
4	DF	Florian Thorwart	20 April 1982 (aged 17)		(Germany) Borussia Dortmund
5	DF	Hannes Wilking	17 April 1982 (aged 17)		(Germany) Werder Bremen
6	MF	Markus Feulner	12 February 1982 (aged 17)		(Germany) Bayern Munich
7	MF	Florian Kringe	18 August 1982 (aged 17)		(Germany) Borussia Dortmund
8	MF	Thomas Hitzlsperger	5 April 1982 (aged 17)		(Germany) Bayern Munich
9	FW	Florian Heller	10 March 1982 (aged 17)		(Germany) Bayern Munich
10	MF	Andreas Hinkel	26 March 1982 (aged 17)		(Germany) VfB Stuttgart
11	FW	Leonhard Haas	9 January 1982 (aged 17)		(Germany) Bayern Munich
12	GK	Dennis Eilhoff	31 July 1982 (aged 17)		(Germany) Arminia Bielefeld
13	DF	Michael Fink	1 February 1982 (aged 17)		(Germany) VfB Stuttgart
14	DF	Stefan Beckert	3 May 1982 (aged 17)		(Germany) Carl Zeiss Jena
15	MF	Andreas Görlitz	31 January 1982 (aged 17)		(Germany) 1860 München
16	MF	Thomas Wörle	11 February 1982 (aged 17)		(Germany) FC Augsburg
17	FW	Daniel Niemann	18 March 1982 (aged 17)		(Germany) Werder Bremen
18	FW	Jürgen Schmid	11 February 1982 (aged 17)		(Germany) Bayern Munich

== Group D ==
=== Jamaica ===
Head Coach: (Brazil) Clovis de Oliveira

No.	Pos.	Player	Date of birth (age)	Caps	Club
1	GK	Keith Wilson	9 August 1982 (aged 17)		(Jamaica) Wadadah
2	DF	Sheldon Battiste	27 July 1983 (aged 16)		(Jamaica) Galaxy
3	DF	Alex Thomas	12 January 1983 (aged 16)		(Jamaica) Real Mona
4	DF	Keveral Stewart	12 July 1982 (aged 17)		(Jamaica) Real Mona
5	DF	Shane Stevens	10 March 1982 (aged 17)		(Jamaica) Real Mona
6	DF	Loren Sailsman	14 March 1982 (aged 17)		(Jamaica) Violet Kickers
7	MF	Sean Fraser	15 February 1983 (aged 16)		(Jamaica) Harbour View
8	MF	Keith Kelly	25 March 1983 (aged 16)		(Jamaica) Harbour View
9	FW	Reinaldo Stewart	10 November 1982 (aged 17)		(Jamaica) Real Mona
10	FW	Anthony Bennett	23 September 1982 (aged 17)		(Jamaica) Real Mona
11	MF	Eshaya Bryan	15 March 1982 (aged 17)		(Jamaica) Cooreville
12	FW	Craig Gordon	12 February 1983 (aged 16)		(Jamaica) Reno
13	GK	Allien Whitthker	19 June 1983 (aged 16)		(Jamaica) Hazard United
14	DF	Kingsley Brown	17 April 1982 (aged 17)		(Jamaica) Reno
15	FW	Dwayne Richards	11 January 1982 (aged 17)		(Jamaica) Cooreville
16	DF	Kevin King	3 February 1982 (aged 17)		(Jamaica) Santos
17	MF	Dane Chambers	2 January 1982 (aged 17)		(Jamaica) Juventos
18	MF	Deshaun Woolery	13 September 1982 (aged 17)		(Jamaica) Violet Kickers

=== Burkina Faso ===
Head Coach: (Burkina Faso) Michel Jacques Yameogo

No.	Pos.	Player	Date of birth (age)	Caps	Club
1	GK	Daouda Diakité	30 March 1983 (aged 16)		(Burkina Faso) Planète Champion
2	DF	Lamine Traoré	10 June 1982 (aged 17)		(Burkina Faso) Planète Champion
3	DF	Jose Yameogo	20 March 1982 (aged 17)		(Burkina Faso) Racing Club Bobo
4	DF	Aboubacar Sanou	7 June 1984 (aged 15)		(Burkina Faso) Racing Club Bobo
5	DF	Soumaila Tassembedo	27 November 1983 (aged 15)		(Burkina Faso) Planète Champion
6	DF	Charles Pafadnam	5 January 1983 (aged 16)		(Burkina Faso) Planète Champion
7	FW	Patrick Zoundi	19 July 1982 (aged 17)		(Burkina Faso) Planète Champion
8	FW	Boureima Maïga	15 November 1983 (aged 15)		(Burkina Faso) Planète Champion
9	FW	Tanguy Barro	13 September 1982 (aged 17)		(Burkina Faso) Racing Club Bobo
10	FW	Moussa Kaboré	6 July 1982 (aged 17)		(Burkina Faso) Santos FC
11	FW	Djibril Compaoré	1 August 1983 (aged 16)		(Burkina Faso) ASFA Yennenga
12	DF	Siaka Sanou	25 December 1984 (aged 14)		(Burkina Faso) Planète Champion
13	MF	Ibrahim Kaboré	5 September 1984 (aged 15)		(Burkina Faso) Planète Champion
14	MF	Issaka Ouedraogo	5 April 1982 (aged 17)		(Burkina Faso) US Ouagadougou
15	MF	Ousseni Zongo	6 August 1984 (aged 15)		(Burkina Faso) Planète Champion
16	FW	Alhassan Gambo	17 June 1983 (aged 16)		(Burkina Faso) Racing Club Bobo
17	MF	Gaston Rouamba	7 December 1982 (aged 16)		(Burkina Faso) Planète Champion
18	GK	Jean Kaboré	10 December 1982 (aged 16)		(Burkina Faso) RCK

=== Paraguay ===
Head Coach: (Paraguay) Christobal Maldonado

No.	Pos.	Player	Date of birth (age)	Caps	Club
1	GK	Ever Caballero	27 April 1982 (aged 17)		(Paraguay) Olimpia
2	DF	David Villalba	13 April 1982 (aged 17)		(Paraguay) Olimpia
3	DF	José Devaca	18 September 1982 (aged 17)		(Paraguay) Cerro Porteño
4	DF	Víctor Melgarejo	24 February 1982 (aged 17)		(Paraguay) Cerro Corá
5	DF	Milner Farina	24 January 1982 (aged 17)		(Paraguay) Atletico Colegiales
6	MF	Walter Fretes	18 May 1982 (aged 17)		(Paraguay) Cerro Porteño
7	FW	Tomás Guzmán	7 March 1982 (aged 17)		(Paraguay) Presidente Hayes
8	MF	Diego Moreno	1 March 1982 (aged 17)		(Paraguay) Olimpia
9	FW	Alejandro Da Silva	18 May 1982 (aged 17)		(Paraguay) Cerro Porteño
10	MF	Victorino Peralta	30 December 1984 (aged 14)		(Paraguay) Sportivo Colombia
11	MF	Diego Figueredo	28 April 1982 (aged 17)		(Paraguay) Olimpia
12	GK	Carlos Veron	21 August 1982 (aged 17)		(Paraguay) Olimpia
13	DF	Ever Miers	2 April 1982 (aged 17)		(Paraguay) Cerro Porteño
14	DF	Rolando Guerrero	6 March 1982 (aged 17)		(Paraguay) 12 de Octubre
15	FW	José Vera	22 September 1983 (aged 16)		(Paraguay) Tacuary
16	FW	Diego Santa Cruz	29 October 1982 (aged 17)		(Paraguay) Cerro Corá
17	FW	Víctor Cabrera	28 June 1982 (aged 17)		(Paraguay) Guaraní
18	FW	Daniel Ferreira	25 September 1982 (aged 17)		(Paraguay) Olimpia

=== Qatar ===
Head Coach: (Qatar) Saeed Al-Misnad

No.	Pos.	Player	Date of birth (age)	Caps	Club
1	GK	Salman Ahmed Al-Ansari	13 June 1983 (aged 16)		Qatar SC
2	DF	Abdullah Al-Asseiri	28 September 1983 (aged 16)		(Qatar) Al Sadd
3	DF	Essa Al-Kuwari	11 November 1982 (aged 16)		(Qatar) Al Shamal
4	DF	Salmeen Fawaz	11 September 1983 (aged 16)		(Qatar) Al Wakrah
5	DF	Mohd Madabbu	4 October 1982 (aged 17)		(Qatar) Al Wakrah
6	DF	Meshal Budawood	25 February 1982 (aged 17)		Qatar SC
7	MF	Mohammed Mohamady	10 October 1982 (aged 17)		(Qatar) Al Tawoun
8	MF	Muamer Abdulrab	20 August 1982 (aged 17)		Qatar SC
9	MF	Ahmed Moosa	7 October 1982 (aged 17)		(Qatar) Al Wakrah
10	MF	Ibrahim Al-Romaihi	7 November 1983 (aged 16)		Qatar SC
11	FW	Waleed Rasoul	7 September 1982 (aged 17)		(Qatar) Al Arabi
12	DF	Mohammed Hussein	1 May 1982 (aged 17)		(Qatar) Al Ittihad
13	FW	Sayed Ali Bechir	6 September 1982 (aged 17)		(Qatar) Al Arabi
14	DF	Ibrahim Al-Ghanim	27 June 1983 (aged 16)		(Qatar) Al Arabi
15	MF	Mohammed Nafeed	27 January 1982 (aged 17)		(Qatar) Al Rayyan
16	FW	Eissa Gholom	27 April 1982 (aged 17)		(Qatar) Al Sadd
17	MF	Bilal Abuhamda	14 November 1983 (aged 15)		(Qatar) Al Sadd
18	GK	Madoud Mohamed	7 February 1983 (aged 16)		(Qatar) Al Arabi
