= 2001 CAF Super Cup =

Hearts of Oak	Zamalek
(Ghana)	(Egypt)
2	0
- Date: 11 February 2001
- Venue: Kumasi Sports Stadium, Kumasi
- Referee: Felix Tangawarima (Zimbabwe)
- Attendance: 25,000

The 2001 CAF Super Cup was the ninth CAF Super Cup, an annual football match in Africa organized by the Confederation of African Football (CAF), between the winners of the previous season's two CAF club competitions, the African Cup of Champions Clubs and the African Cup Winners' Cup.

== Teams ==
Team	Qualification	Previous participation (bold indicates winners)
(Ghana) Hearts of Oak	2000 CAF Champions League winner	
(Egypt) Zamalek	2000 African Cup Winners' Cup winner	**1994**, **1997**

== Match details ==
11 February 2001

Hearts of Oak (Ghana)	2 – 0	(Egypt) Zamalek
Taylor 11'; Osei Kuffour 46'	Report

Kumasi Sports Stadium
Attendance: 25,000
Referee: Felix Tangawarima (Zimbabwe)

**Hearts of Oak**	**Zamalek**

GK	(Ghana) Sammy Adjei
CB	(Ghana) Amankwa Mireku
CB	(Ghana) Jacob Nettey
CB	(Ghana) Dan Quaye
RM	(Ghana) Stephen Tetteh
CM	(Ghana) Edmund Copson
CM	(Ghana) Adja Tetteh		(substituted off) 87'
LM	(Ghana) Charles Allotey	(yellow card) 25'	(substituted off) 72'
CM	(Ghana) Ishmael Addo
CF	(Ghana) Emmanuel Osei Kuffour	(yellow card) 60'
CF	(Ghana) Charles Taylor
Substitutes:
MF	(Ghana) Emmanuel Adjogu		(substituted on) 72'
MF	(Ghana) Abdul Razak		(substituted on) 87'
Manager:
(Ghana) Cecil Jones Attuquayefio

GK	1	(Egypt) Abdel-Wahed El-Sayed
RB	2	(Egypt) Ibrahim Hassan
CB	25	(Egypt) Medhat Abdel-Hady
CB	22	(Egypt) Hossam Abdel-Moneim
CB	3	(Egypt) Haytham Farouk
LB	17	(Egypt) Ahmed Saleh	(substituted off) 55'
CM	16	(Egypt) Tarek El-Said
CM	23	(Egypt) Tamer Abdel Hamid
CM	4	(Egypt) Khaled El-Ghandour	(substituted off) 69'
RF	9	(Egypt) Hossam Hassan	(substituted off) 72'
LF	10	(Egypt) Walid Salah Abdel-Latif
Substitutes:
DF	13	(Egypt) Tarek El-Sayed	(substituted on) 55'
MF	7	(Egypt) El-Hassan Mohamed	(substituted on) 69'
FW	19	(Egypt) Abdel-Latif El-Doumany	(substituted on) 72'
Manager:
(Germany) Otto Pfister
