= Charles Asampong Taylor =

Ghanaian football striker (born 1981)

Kweku Asampong
Personal information
- Full name: Charles Kweku Bismark Taylor Asampong
- Date of birth: 14 July 1981 (age 45)
- Place of birth: Sefwi Asanwinso, Ghana
- Height: 1.84 m (6 ft 0 in)
- Position: Striker

Senior career*
| Years | Team | Apps | (Gls) |
| 1998–2000 | Great Olympics | | |
| 2000–2003 | Accra Hearts of Oak | | |
| 2003–2004 | Asante Kotoko | | |
| 2004–2006 | Etoile du Sahel | | |
| 2006–2010 | Accra Hearts of Oak | | |
| 2010–2011 | Enugu Rangers | | |
| 2011–2014 | Berekum Chelsea | | |

International career
| 1999–2004 | Ghana | 16 | (2) |
- * Club domestic league appearances and goals

Charles Kweku Bismark Taylor Asampong (born 14 July 1981 in Sefwi, Western Region) is a former Ghanaian professional footballer who played as a striker or an attacking midfielder. He had his greatest playing days and is one of the few players to play for Accra Hearts of Oak S.C. and Asante Kotoko. As a kid, he was often called tailor, after his uncle who was a tailor as he used to help his uncle with work, hence, he adopted the name Charles Taylor after the former Liberian president. Nicknamed "Terror" due to his ability to terrorise opponents. He's arguably one of the greatest players to ever play the Ghana premier league and a key member of the famous "64 Battalion" squad of Accra Hearts of Oak S.C. that won the African Champions League in 2000 and consecutive Ghanaian league titles.

== Club career ==
=== Early life ===
His playing career started off at Great Olympics, where he used to polish the shoes of their management, he had a bet with the then chairman Ade Coker that he could play better than the team players, he was asked to play and showed excellent dribbling skills, he later signed for the club.

=== Accra Hearts of Oak ===
Asamponk transferred to Accra Hearts of Oak in 2000 where he helped them win the Ghana premier national league in 2000, 2001 and 2002 seasons. Then coached by Sir Cecil Jones Attuquayefio and Ofei Ansah, Taylor formed a partnership with Ishmael Addo and Emmanuel Osei Kuffour affectionately called the deadly trio. In addition to the national premier league in 2000, Hearts of oak won the FA cup and the African champions league for the first time. In February 2001, they won the African Super Cup Championship where he scored the first goal against Al-Zamalek of Egypt at the Kumasi Sports Stadium. Charles Taylor alongside Charles Allotey, Amankwah Mireku, Joseph Ansah, Jacob Nettey, Stephen Tetteh, Ishmael Addo, Emmanuel Osei Kuffour, Sammy Adjei, Edmund Copson, and Emmanuel Adjogu were deemed as the best squad ever to be assembled by Accra Hearts of oak and also famously called "64 Battalion" a name after the most feared unit of the Ghana Army in the 1990s

=== Asante Kotoko ===
He controversially transferred from Accra Hearts of Oak to arch-rivals Asante Kotoko in 2003 for the then domestic transfer record fee of GH₵ 40,000 (roughly US$42,000). Charles Taylor essentially boycotted training with Hearts of oak and did not play any games way into the season just to force the move. His first season with Kotoko was a success and he won the Ghana Premier league with Kotoko in 2003. However, this transfer caused a lot of bitter local sentiment towards Taylor, from which his popularity has never recovered. Taylor joined Etoile du Sahel from Kotoko in 2004 for a fee of US$250,000 After an unsuccessful spell in Tunisia he was loaned to Accra Hearts of Oak in October 2006.

== International career ==
He was part of the Ghanaian 2004 Olympic football team that exited in the first round, having finished in third place in group B. He was a silver medalist with Ghana U-20 team at 2001 Africa youth championship in Ethiopia. He currently has forty one caps for the Ghana national football team, the Black Stars, scoring nineteen goals. Taylor represented the Black Stars at 2009 African Championship of Nations in Côte d'Ivoire, where they finished second, beaten by the famous Congo.

== Personal life ==
In August 2015, he was ordained as a priest, after making known his intentions of becoming a pastor to propagate the word of God.

== Honours ==
Accra Hearts of Oak

- Ghana Premier League: 2000, 2001, 2002, 2006–07, 2008–09
- Ghanaian FA Cup: 2000
- African Champions League: 2000
- African Super Cup: 2000

Asante Kotoko

- Ghana Premier League: 2003

Ghana

- African Nations Championship runners-up: 2009

Individual

- Ghana Premier League Top Scorer (shared with Bernard Dong Bortey): 2002
- SWAG Sports Personality of the year: 2002
- GFA player of the year: 2001
