= Compaoré =

Compaoré is a surname. Notable people with the surname include:

- Bassirou Compaoré (born 1998), Burkinabé football striker
- Benjamin Compaoré (born 1987), French triple jumper
- Blaise Compaoré (born 1951), Burkinabé politician, President of Burkina Faso
- Chantal Compaoré (born 1962), First Lady of Burkina Faso, wife of Blaise
- Daouda Compaoré (born 1973), Burkinabé football goalkeeper
- Djibril Compaoré (born 1983), Burkinabé football striker
- François Compaoré (born 1954), Burkinabé politician
- Issouf Compaoré (born 1988), Burkinabé football defender
- Simon Compaoré (born 1952), Burkinabé politician
- Tegwinde Rebeca Compaore, Burkinabé microbiologist
