= Michael Donkor (footballer) =

Ghanaian footballer

Michael Donkor (born 24 January 1982) is former Ghanaian professional footballer who played as a defender. He played most of his career with Ghanaian Premier league giants Accra Hearts of Oak.

== Club career ==
Donkor played most of his career with Accra Hearts of Oak though he started his career with a lower-tier side De Gaulle Stars. He is remembered most for scoring the final penalty spot during the 2004 CAF Confederation Cup Final match against Asante Kotoko helping Hearts to clinch the title.

== International career ==
Donkor was a member of the Ghana national under-17 football team during 1999 FIFA U-17 World Cup along with players like Michael Essien, Bernard Dong Bortey, Stephen Oduro and Ishmael Addo. At the competition Ghana placed third.
