= 2000 CAF Champions League final =

- Event: 2000 CAF Champions League
ES Tunis	Hearts of Oak
(Tunisia)	(Ghana)
2	5
- On aggregate

First leg
ES Tunis	Hearts of Oak
1	2
- Date: 2 December 2000
- Venue: Stade El Menzah, Tunis
- Referee: Lim Kee Chong (Mauritius)
- Attendance: 30,000

Second leg
Hearts of Oak	ES Tunis
3	1
- Date: 17 December 2000
- Venue: Ohene Djan Stadium, Accra
- Referee: Robin Williams (South Africa)
- Attendance: 45,000

The 2000 CAF Champions League final was a football tie held over two legs in December 2000. Hearts of Oak of Ghana beat Espérance of Tunisia 5–2.

== Qualified teams ==
In the following table, finals until 1996 were in the African Cup of Champions Club era, since 1997 were in the CAF Champions League era.

Team	Region	Previous finals appearances (bold indicates winners)
(Tunisia) ES Tunis	UNAF (North Africa)	**1994**, 1999
(Ghana) Hearts of Oak	WAFU (West Africa)	1977, 1979

== Venues ==
=== Stade El Menzah ===
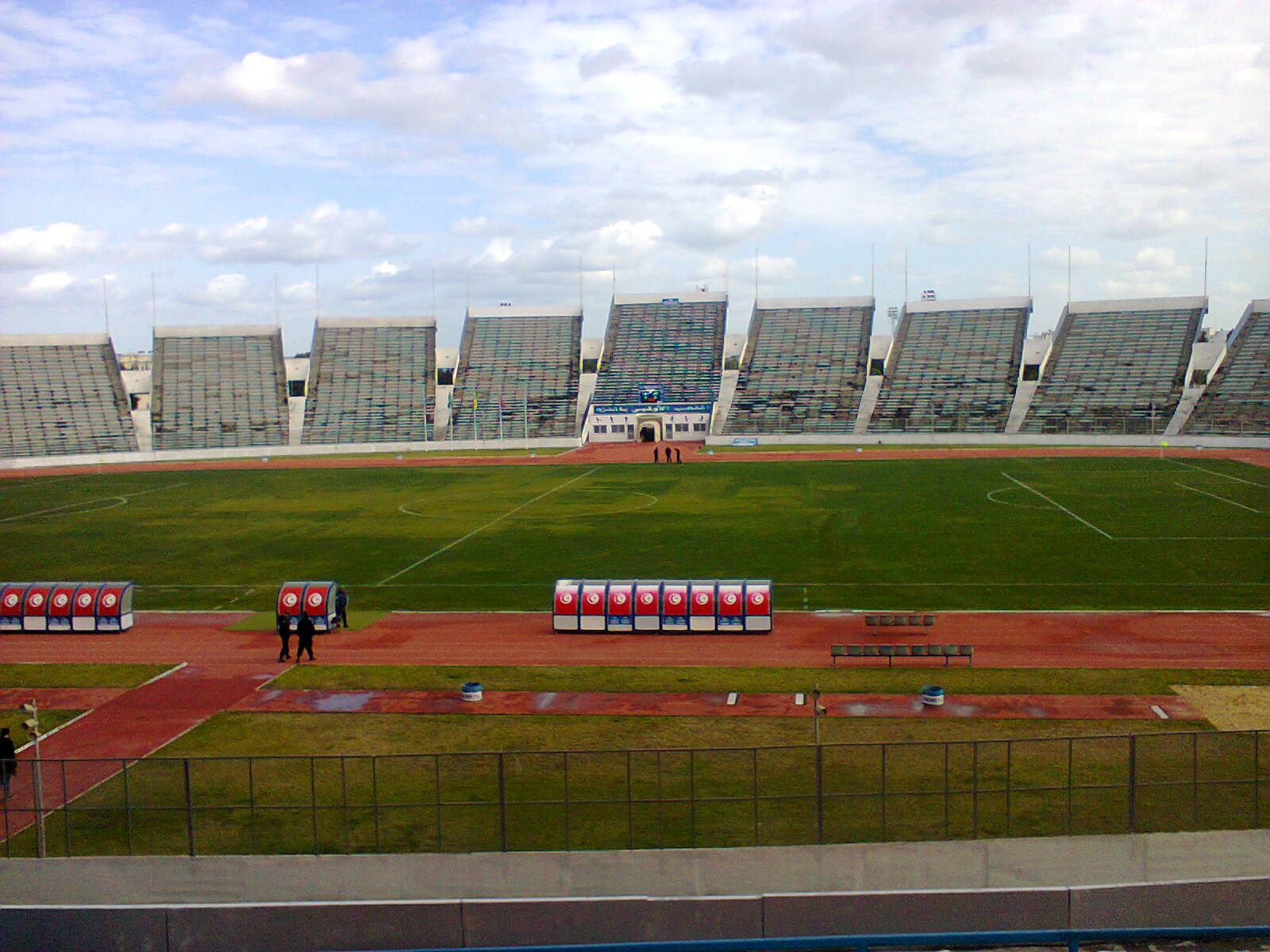
Stade El Menzah in Tunis, Tunisia hosted the first leg.

Stade Olympique El Menzah is a multi-purpose stadium, located in the north of Tunis, Tunisia.

It is built to host the 1967 Mediterranean Games at the same time as the Olympic swimming pool and gymnasium. Since then, it is an integral part of Tunisia's main sports complex. Tunisia's three major football teams, ES Tunis, Club Africain and Stade Tunisien played their games there. The stadium is completely renovated for the 1994 African Cup of Nations. It has a capacity of 39,858 seats. The VIP section consists of a grandstand and 2 salons that can accommodate 300 people in a "cocktail" configuration.

=== Ohene Djan Stadium ===
The Accra Sports Stadium, formerly named the Ohene Djan Stadium is a multi-use, 39,800 all-seater stadium in Accra. Ghana, mostly used for association football matches. It is also used for rugby union.

The stadium was inaugurated in 1952 by a football match played between Accra XI and Kumasi XI.

The stadium is also the home of one of Africa's most popular clubs, Hearts of Oak as well as Great Olympics, but Ghana's national team matches are sometimes played there.

During the 2000 African Cup of Nations in Ghana and Nigeria, the stadium hosted 9 matches, and was also the venue of the 1978 final.

== Road to final ==
(Tunisia) ES Tunis				Round	(Ghana) Hears of Oak			
Opponent	Agg.	1st leg	2nd leg	Qualifying rounds	Opponent	Agg.	1st leg	2nd leg
(Rwanda) APR FC	7–0	7–0 (H)	withdrew (A)	First round	(Guinea) Horoya AC	4–3	2–1 (H)	2–2 (A)
(Mali) Djoliba AC	4–3	3–2 (H)	1–1 (A)	Second round	(Democratic Republic of the Congo) DC Motema Pembe	4–3	4–1 (H)	0–2 (A)
Opponent	Result			Group stage	Opponent	Result		
(Cameroon) Sable FC	4–0 (H)			Matchday 1	(Egypt) Al Ahly	2–1 (H)		
(Ivory Coast) Africa Sports	1–2 (A)			Matchday 2	(Senegal) Jeanne d'Arc	4–2 (A)		
(South Africa) Mamelodi Sundowns	3–2 (H)			Matchday 3	(Nigeria) Lobi Stars	2–0 (A)		
(South Africa) Mamelodi Sundowns	0–2 (A)			Matchday 4	(Nigeria) Lobi Stars	2–0 (H)		
(Cameroon) Sable FC	2–1 (A)			Matchday 5	(Egypt) Al Ahly SC	1–1 (A)		
(Ivory Coast) Africa Sports	2–0 (H)			Matchday 6	(Senegal) Jeanne d'Arc	1–1 (H)		
Group A Winner: Pos / Team / Pld / W / D / L / GF / GA / GD / Pts / Qualification; 1 / (Tunisia) ES Tunis / 6 / 4 / 0 / 2 / 12 / 7 / +5 / **12** / Final; 2 / (South Africa) Mamelodi Sundowns / 6 / 4 / 0 / 2 / 11 / 11 / 0 / **12**; 3 / (Ivory Coast) Africa Sports / 6 / 3 / 1 / 2 / 12 / 8 / +4 / **10**; 4 / (Cameroon) Sable FC / 6 / 0 / 1 / 5 / 5 / 14 / −9 / **1**; Source: Rules for classification: Group stage tiebreakers				Final standings	Group B Winner: Pos / Team / Pld / W / D / L / GF / GA / GD / Pts / Qualification; 1 / (Ghana) Hearts of Oak / 6 / 4 / 2 / 0 / 12 / 5 / +7 / **14** / Final; 2 / (Egypt) Al Ahly / 6 / 2 / 2 / 2 / 10 / 9 / +1 / **8**; 3 / (Nigeria) Lobi Stars / 6 / 2 / 1 / 3 / 7 / 9 / −2 / **7**; 4 / (Senegal) Jeanne d'Arc / 6 / 0 / 3 / 3 / 6 / 12 / −6 / **3**; Source: Rules for classification: Group stage tiebreakers			

== Format ==
The final was decided over two legs, with aggregate goals used to determine the winner. If the sides were level on aggregate after the second leg, the away goals rule would have been applied, and if still level, the tie would have proceeded directly to a penalty shootout (no extra time is played).

== Matches ==
=== First leg ===
2 December 2000
--:-- UTC+1

ES Tunis (Tunisia)	1–2	(Ghana) Hearts of Oak
Zitouni 36'		Addo 52'; Kuffour 79'

Stade El Menzah, Tunis
Attendance: 30,000
Referee: Lim Kee Chong (Mauritius)

=== Second leg ===
17 December 2000
--:-- UTC+0

Hearts of Oak (Ghana)	3–1 (Note: The match was interrupted for 18 minutes at 75' with ES Tunis leading 1–0 after teargas was fired into a rioting crowd by police, with one canister landing in the VIP box.ES Tunis protested against the result, but the protest was rejected. It was also marred by the antics of Espérance's goalkeeper Chokri El Ouaer who deliberately injured himself with the intent to get the game abandoned since Espérance had exhausted their substitution. He was banned for one year by CAF for gamesmanship after the game.)	(Tunisia) ES Tunis
Kuffour 83', 89'; Addo 90'		Gabsi 18'

Ohene Djan Stadium, Accra
Attendance: 45,000
Referee: Robin Williams (South Africa)
