= Boureima =

Boureima is a given name. Here is a list of notable people, with this name:

- Boureima Badini (born 1956), Burkinabé politician
- Boureima Hassane Bandé (born 1998), Burkinabé football player
- Boureima Maïga (born 1983), Burkinabé football player
- Boureima Ouattara (born 1984), Burkinabé football player
- Boureima Zongo (born 16 March 1972), Burkinabé former footballer

== See also ==
- Bourem Airport
