= Moussa Kaboré =

Burkinabé footballer

Personal information
- Full name: Moussa Kabore Menolasso
- Date of birth: July 6, 1982 (age 44)
- Place of birth: Kombissiri, Upper Volta
- Height: 1.82 m (6 ft 0 in)
- Position: Striker

Youth career
- Santos FC

Senior career*
| Years | Team | Apps | (Gls) |
| 2000–2001 | ASFA Yennenga | | |
| 2001–2002 | LR Ahlen | | |
| 2002–2005 | 1. FC Bocholt | 50 | (10) |
| 2005–2006 | TuRU Düsseldorf | | |
| 2006–2008 | Wydad Casablanca | | |
| 2008–2009 | KS Bylis Ballsh | 12 | (1) |

International career
| 1999 | Burkina Faso U-17 | | |
- * Club domestic league appearances and goals

Moussa Kaboré (born 6 July 1982 in Kombissiri, Burkina Faso) is a Burkinabé football striker.

Kaboré was part of the Burkinabé U-17 World Championship team, which finished third place of its group in the first round of competition. In 2000–2001 he played for ASFA Yennenga in the Burkinabé Premier League.

In Germany, the striker played for LR Ahlen, 1. FC Bocholt and TuRU Düsseldorf. In 2006, Kaboré moved to Moroccan sports club Wydad Casablanca and two years later he joined KS Bylis Ballsh in the Albanian Superliga.
