= Clóvis de Oliveira =

Brazilian football manager

Personal information
- Full name: Clóvis Alberto de Oliveira
- Date of birth: 22 October 1954 (age 72)
- Place of birth: Duque de Caxias, Brazil

Managerial career
- Years: Team
- 1991: Friburguense
- 1992: Trinidad and Tobago
- 1995–1996: Tanzania
- 1999: Jamaica U17
- 2000–2001: Jamaica
- 2004: Brazil Women (assistant)
- 2009: America-RJ
- 2016: America-RJ
- 2022–2023: Chapelton Maroons

Clóvis Alberto de Oliveira (born 22 October 1954) is a Brazilian football manager, currently in charge of Jamaican club Chapelton Maroons.

== Coaching career ==
Having managed the Trinidad and Tobago and Tanzania national teams, Clovis de Oliveira was managing in Saudi Arabia when he was offered the chance to take the Jamaica U17 to the 1999 FIFA U-17 World Championship by friend and compatriot, René Simões. He went on to manage the Jamaica national team for the following two years.

Following his departure in 2001, he went on to work as assistant coach to René Simões with the Brazil women's national team at the 2004 Summer Olympics.

In 2009, he was appointed manager of America-RJ, and went on to record 21 wins in 31 games. He managed Friburguense before returning to America-RJ in 2016.

He has also managed in the United Arab Emirates and Oman.
