= Kwame Pele Frimpong =

Ghanaian footballer

Kwame Frimpong
Personal information
- Full name: Kwame Pelé Frimpong
- Date of birth: 24 September 1983 (age 43)
- Place of birth: Cape Coast, Ghana
- Height: 1.73 m (5 ft 8 in)
- Position: Midfielder

Youth career
- Asante Kotoko
- Panathinaikos F.C.

Senior career*
Years	Team	Apps	(Gls)
2001–2004	Marko	0	(0)
2004–2005	Kalamata	34	(4)
2005–2008	Chaidari	75	(5)
2008–2009	Ilisiakos	26	(1)
2009–2010	Egaleo	24	(0)
2010-2011	Thrasyvoulos	20	(3)
2011–2015	Ebusua Dwarfs	16	(1)

International career
1999	Ghana U-17	4	(0)
- * Club domestic league appearances and goals as of 8 February 2026

Kwame Pelé Frimpong (born 24 September 1983) is a former Ghanaian professional footballer.

== Career ==
Frimpong previously played for Greek clubs Ilisiakos F.C., Chaidari F.C., Kalamata F.C. and Marko F.C. In January 2012, Frimpong transferred from Egaleo F.C. to Ghana top-flight club Ebusua Dwarfs for an undisclosed fee.

== International career ==
Frimpong played for the Ghana national under-17 football team in the 1999 FIFA U-17 World Championship in New Zealand.
