= 2000 CAF Champions League group stage =

The group stage of the 2000 CAF Champions League was played from 22 July to 12 November 2000. A total of eight teams competed in the group stage.

== Format ==
In the group stage, each group was played on a home-and-away round-robin basis. The winners of each group advanced directly to the final.

== Groups ==
The matchdays were 22–23 July, 4–7 August, 19–20 August, 13–15 September, 27 October–4 November, and 11–12 November 2000.

Key to colours in group tables
Group winners advance to the final

=== Group A ===
Pos	Team	Pld	W	D	L	GF	GA	GD	Pts	Qualification
1	(Tunisia) ES Tunis	6	4	0	2	12	7	+5	12	Final
2	(South Africa) Mamelodi Sundowns	6	4	0	2	11	11	0	12	
3	(Ivory Coast) Africa Sports	6	3	1	2	12	8	+4	10	
4	(Cameroon) Sable FC	6	0	1	5	5	14	−9	1	

Rules for classification: Group stage tiebreakers
22 July 2000

Mamelodi Sundowns (South Africa)	2–0	(Ivory Coast) Africa Sports

Loftus Versfeld Stadium, Pretoria
23 July 2000

ES Tunis (Tunisia)	4–0	(Cameroon) Sable FC

Stade El Menzah, Tunis

6 August 2000

Africa Sports (Ivory Coast)	2–1	(Tunisia) ES Tunis

Stade Félix Houphouët-Boigny, Abidjan
7 August 2000

Sable FC (Cameroon)	1–2	(South Africa) Mamelodi Sundowns

19 August 2000

ES Tunis (Tunisia)	3–2	(South Africa) Mamelodi Sundowns

Stade El Menzah, Tunis
19 August 2000

Sable FC (Cameroon)	1–1	(Ivory Coast) Africa Sports

14 October 2000

Mamelodi Sundowns (South Africa)	2–0	(Tunisia) ES Tunis

Loftus Versfeld Stadium, Pretoria
15 October 2000

Africa Sports (Ivory Coast)	3–1	(Cameroon) Sable FC

Stade Félix Houphouët-Boigny, Abidjan

29 October 2000

Sable FC (Cameroon)	1–2	(Tunisia) ES Tunis

4 November 2000

Africa Sports (Ivory Coast)	6–1	(South Africa) Mamelodi Sundowns

Stade Félix Houphouët-Boigny, Abidjan

11 November 2000

Mamelodi Sundowns (South Africa)	2–1	(Cameroon) Sable FC

Loftus Versfeld Stadium, Pretoria
11 November 2000

ES Tunis (Tunisia)	2–0	(Ivory Coast) Africa Sports

Stade El Menzah, Tunis

=== Group B ===
Pos	Team	Pld	W	D	L	GF	GA	GD	Pts	Qualification
1	(Ghana) Hearts of Oak	6	4	2	0	12	5	+7	14	Final
2	(Egypt) Al Ahly	6	2	2	2	10	9	+1	8	
3	(Nigeria) Lobi Stars	6	2	1	3	7	9	−2	7	
4	(Senegal) Jeanne d'Arc	6	0	3	3	6	12	−6	3	

Rules for classification: Group stage tiebreakers
22 July 2000

Lobi Stars (Nigeria)	3–1	(Senegal) Jeanne d'Arc

Aper Aku Stadium, Makurdi
23 July 2000

Hearts of Oak (Ghana)	2–1	(Egypt) Al Ahly

Ohene Djan Stadium, Accra

4 August 2000

Al Ahly (Egypt)	3–1	(Nigeria) Lobi Stars

Cairo International Stadium, Cairo
5 August 2000

Jeanne d'Arc (Senegal)	2–4	(Ghana) Hearts of Oak

Stade Demba Diop, Dakar

19 August 2000

Lobi Stars (Nigeria)	0–2	(Ghana) Hearts of Oak

Aper Aku Stadium, Makurdi
19 August 2000

Jeanne d'Arc (Senegal)	1–1	(Egypt) Al Ahly

Stade Demba Diop, Dakar

13 October 2000

Al Ahly (Egypt)	3–1	(Senegal) Jeanne d'Arc

Cairo International Stadium, Cairo
15 October 2000

Hearts of Oak (Ghana)	2–0	(Nigeria) Lobi Stars

Ohene Djan Stadium, Accra

27 October 2000

Al Ahly (Egypt)	1–1	(Ghana) Hearts of Oak

Cairo International Stadium, Cairo
29 October 2000

Jeanne d'Arc (Senegal)	0–0	(Nigeria) Lobi Stars

Stade Demba Diop, Dakar

12 November 2000

Hearts of Oak (Ghana)	1–1	(Senegal) Jeanne d'Arc

Ohene Djan Stadium, Accra
12 November 2000

Lobi Stars (Nigeria)	3–1	(Egypt) Al Ahly

Aper Aku Stadium, Makurdi
