= Bernard Dong Bortey =

Ghanaian footballer (born 1982)

Bernard Bortey
Personal information
- Full name: Bernard Dong-Bortey
- Date of birth: 22 September 1982 (age 44)
- Place of birth: Nungua, Ghana
- Height: 1.80 m (5 ft 11 in)
- Position: Winger

Senior career*
Years	Team	Apps	(Gls)
2000	Ghapoha Readers		
2001–2010	Hearts of Oak		(54)
2002–2003	→ Al Wasl (loan)		
2008–2009	→ Bnei Sakhnin (loan)		
2010–2013	Aduana Stars		
2011–2012	→ Sông Lam Nghệ An (loan)		(0)
2013	New Edubiase United		
2014	The Panthers		
2015	Ånge IF	2	(0)
2019	Great Olympics	0	(0)

International career
1999	Ghana U-17	6	(3)
2002–2004	Ghana	7	(0)
- * Club domestic league appearances and goals

Bernard Dong Bortey (born 22 September 1982) is a Ghanaian retired footballer who played as an attacking winger.

== Career ==
Bortey began his career in 2000 with Ghapoha Readers in Tema. One year later, he moved to Accra Hearts of Oak SC and became an integral part of the "64 Battalion" and a deadly force alongside Charles Asampong Taylor, Ishmael Addo, Emmanuel Osei Kuffour. Hearts loaned him out in 2002 to Al Wasl FC in Dubai, where he played for 6 months. He returned in June 2002 to Hearts where he won the league and shared the Top Scorer award with Charles Asampong Taylor.

Since 2015 in Sweden with Ånge IF, Bortey was without club until signing with Ghanaian club Accra Great Olympics in December 2019. However, in the beginning of January 2020, Olympics manager Prince George Koffie said, that he hadn't seen Bortey yet and therefore wasn't a part of his team. A few days later Bortey said that he didn't receive the financial benefits he was promised when he signed the contract and that he wouldn't play until they had paid him. On 6 April 2020, Bortey officially announced his retirement and expressed, that he would like to be a coach.

== International career ==
Bortey played seven games for the Ghanaian national football team without scoring; the latest game being in the qualifying stage of the 2006 FIFA World Cup. He also represented his homeland in the 1999 FIFA U-17 World Championship in New Zealand, where he played 6 games and scored 3 goals, helping Ghana to third place.

== Style of play ==
Nicknamed "Dong Dada Diouf" a reference to Senegalese forward El Hadji Diouf due to similar style of play and his dyed hair.

== Honours ==
=== Club ===
Hearts of Oak

- Ghana Premier League: 2001, 2002, 2004, 2006–07
- CAF Confederation Cup: 2004

Song Lam Nghe An

- V-League: 2011

=== International ===
Ghana U-17

- FIFA U-17 World Championship Third place: 1999

=== Individual ===
- Ghana Premier League Top goalscorer: 2002
- GHALCA Top Four Top goalscorer: 2012
