= Robert Sierant =

Polish footballer

Personal information
- Full name: Robert Sierant
- Date of birth: 8 July 1982 (age 44)
- Place of birth: Łódź, Poland
- Height: 1.89 m (6 ft 2 1/2 in)
- Position: Midfielder

Team information
- Current team: Guzovia Guzów
- Number: 6

Youth career
- 1997–1999: ŁKS Łódź

Senior career*
| Years | Team | Apps | (Gls) |
| 1999–2009 | ŁKS Łódź | 135 | (4) |
| 2007–2008 | → Kolejarz Stróże (loan) | 44 | (1) |
| 2010–2011 | Chojniczanka Chojnice | 28 | (2) |
| 2011 | Olimpia Elbląg | 10 | (1) |
| 2012 | Chojniczanka Chojnice | 11 | (0) |
| 2012–2013 | Energetyk Gryfino | 28 | (4) |
| 2013 | Zawisza Rzgów | 1 | (0) |
| 2013–2014 | Sokół Kleczew | 31 | (4) |
| 2014–2015 | ŁKS Łódź | 29 | (6) |
| 2015–2016 | Żyrardowianka Żyrardów | | |
| 2016–2017 | Guzovia Guzów | | |
| 2017 | Orzeł Piątkowisko | 3 | (1) |
| 2019– | Guzovia Guzów | 98 | (38) |

International career
- Poland U16
- Poland U17
- Poland U18
Medal record
Men's football
Representing Poland
UEFA European Under-18 Championship
| Winner | 2001 Finland |
UEFA European Under-16 Championship
| Runner-up | 1999 Czech Republic |
- * Club domestic league appearances and goals as of 20:55, 30 June 2025 (UTC)

Robert Sierant (born 8 July 1982) is a Polish footballer who plays as a midfielder for Klasa A club Guzovia Guzów.

== Club career ==
In July 2011, he joined Olimpia Elbląg.

== International career ==
In 1999, he played at the FIFA U-17 World Championship tournament. In 2000, Sierant played at the UEFA European Under-16 Football Championship tournament. In 2001, he won the UEFA European Under-18 Football Championship with the Poland under-18 team.

== Honours ==
Sokół Kleczew

- III liga Kuyavia-Pomerania – Greater Poland: 2013–14
- Polish Cup (Greater Poland regionals): 2013–14
- Polish Cup (Konin regionals): 2013–14

Guzovia Guzów

- Klasa B Warsaw V: 2021–22

Poland U16

- UEFA European Under-16 Championship runner-up: 1999

Poland U18

- UEFA European Under-18 Championship: 2001
