= Stephen Oduro =

Ghanaian footballer

Personal information
- Full name: Stephen Oduro
- Date of birth: April 13, 1983 (age 43)
- Place of birth: Tamale, Ghana
- Position: Midfielder

Youth career
- 1996: Conesterstones Babies
- 1997–1998: Real Tamale United

Senior career*
Years	Team	Apps	(Gls)
1999	Real Tamale United		
2000	Asante Kotoko		

International career
2003	Ghana		
- * Club domestic league appearances and goals

Stephen Oduro (born 13 April 1983) is a professional footballer who plays as a midfielder.

== Career ==
Oduro, nicknamed "Yaw Zico or Tico Tico" because of his height, began his career with Real Tamale United and was transferred in 2000 to Asante Kotoko. He has been an instrumental part to porcupine warriors since his arrival from the north giants.

== International ==
He is also former Black Stars, and was a member of the Black Starlets squad for the 1999 FIFA U-17 World Championship in New Zealand.
