= Cheick Bathily =

Malian football player

Personal information
- Full name: Cheick Oumar Bathily
- Date of birth: 10 October 1982 (age 44)
- Place of birth: Mali
- Height: 1.73 m (5 ft 8 in)
- Position: Goalkeeper

Senior career*
| Years | Team | Apps | (Gls) |
| 2003–2009 | Djoliba AC | | |
| 2009–2013 | CS Duguwolofila | | |
| 2013–2015 | Djoliba AC | | |
| 2016–2017 | CS Duguwolofila | | |

International career
| 2004–2013 | Mali | 4 | (0) |
- * Club domestic league appearances and goals

Cheick Oumar Bathily (born 10 October 1982) is a retired Malian football goalkeeper.

== Career ==
In 2009 left Djoliba AC and signed for League rival CS Duguwolofila.

=== International ===
He was part of the Malian 2004 Olympic football team, who exited in the quarter-finals, finishing top of group A, but losing to Italy in the next round.
