= Suriya Amatawech =

Thai footballer

Personal information
- Full name: Suriya Amatawech
- Date of birth: 28 January 1982 (age 44)
- Place of birth: Phattalung, Thailand
- Height: 1.69 m (5 ft 6 1/2 in)
- Position: Striker

Youth career
- Bangkok Christian College

Senior career*
Years	Team	Apps	(Gls)
2007–2009	Chula United		
2010	Phattalung		

International career
1998–1999	Thailand U17	3	(1)
2000–2001	Thailand U20		
- * Club domestic league appearances and goals as of 22 June 2008

Suriya Amatawech (Thai: สุริยะ อมตเวทย์, born 28 January 1982) is a Thai former professional footballer who plays as a striker.

== International career ==
Suriya played for Thailand at the 1999 FIFA U-17 World Championship in New Zealand.
