= Łukasz Mierzejewski =

Polish footballer (born 1982)

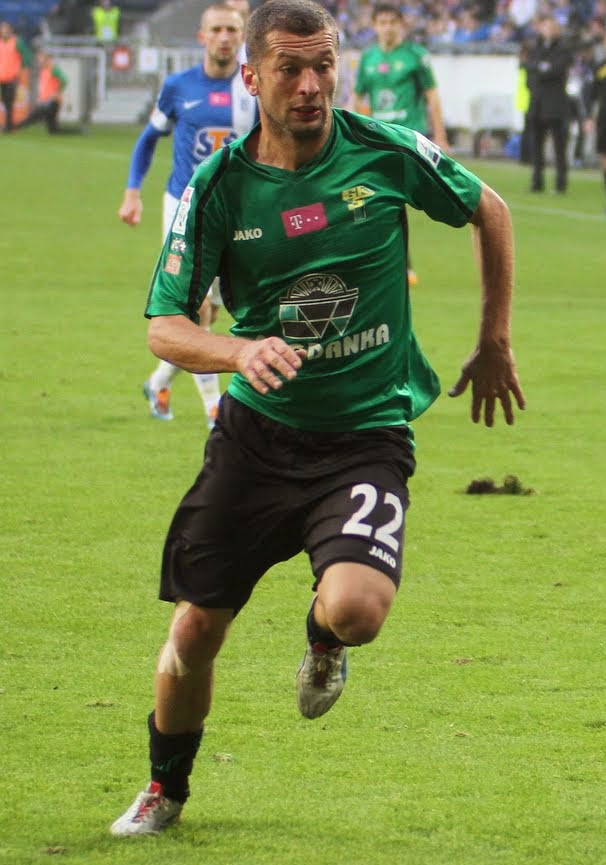
- Mierzejewski with Górnik Łęczna in 2014

Personal information
- Full name: Łukasz Mierzejewski
- Date of birth: 31 August 1982 (age 44)
- Place of birth: Ciechanów, Poland
- Height: 1.82 m (6 ft 0 in)
- Position: Defender

Team information
- Current team: Górnik Łęczna (assistant)

Youth career
- SP 3 Ciechanów
- 1999: Lechia-Polonia Gdańsk
- 2000: Legia Warsaw

Senior career*
Years	Team	Apps	(Gls)
2000–2002	Legia Warsaw	13	(1)
2002–2003	ŁKS Łódź	31	(7)
2003–2004	Świt NDM	22	(2)
2004–2007	Zagłębie Lubin	53	(5)
2007–2009	Widzew Łódź	40	(1)
2009–2011	Cracovia	45	(1)
2011	Kavala	0	(0)
2012	Podbeskidzie	5	(0)
2012–2013	HNK Rijeka	17	(0)
2014–2017	Górnik Łęczna	63	(3)
Total		289	(20)

International career
- Poland U15
- Poland U16
- Poland U17
- Poland U18
2010	Poland	5	(0)

Managerial career
- 2017–2019: Lewart Lubartów
- 2019–2024: Avia Świdnik
- 2024–2025: Sandecja Nowy Sącz
Medal record
Men's football
Representing Poland
UEFA European Under-18 Championship
Winner	2001 Finland
UEFA European Under-16 Championship
Runner-up	1999 Czech Republic
- * Club domestic league appearances and goals

Łukasz Mierzejewski (born 31 August 1982) is a Polish professional football manager and former player who is currently the assistant manager of II liga club Górnik Łęczna.

== Club career ==
Mierzejewski was released from Cracovia on 15 July 2011. Then, he joined Greek side Kavala on 11 August 2011 and returned to Poland for Podbeskidzie Bielsko-Biała on 29 December 2011.

== International career ==
In 1999, Mierzejewski played at the FIFA U-17 World Championship tournament. In 2000, he played at the UEFA European Under-16 Championship tournament. In 2001, he won the UEFA European Under-18 Championship with the Poland under-18 team.

In 2010, Mierzejewski earned five caps for the senior national team.

== Managerial statistics ==
As of match played 21 October 2025

Managerial record by team and tenure
Team	From	To	Record							
Team	From	To	G	W	D	L	GF	GA	GD	Win %
Lewart Lubartów	12 September 2017	30 June 2019	57	35	8	14	134	50	+84	61.40
Avia Świdnik	1 July 2019	30 June 2024	180	98	40	42	366	176	+190	54.44
Sandecja Nowy Sącz	9 July 2024	21 October 2025	53	31	13	9	95	58	+37	58.49
Total			290	164	61	65	595	284	+311	56.55

== Honours ==
=== Player ===
Legia Warsaw

- Ekstraklasa: 2001–02
- Polish League Cup: 2001–02

Zagłębie Lubin

- Ekstraklasa: 2006–07

Poland U16

- UEFA European Under-16 Championship runner-up: 1999

Poland U18

- UEFA European Under-18 Championship: 2001

=== Manager ===
Avia Świdnik

- Polish Cup (Lublin Voivodeship regionals): 2023–24
- Polish Cup (Lublin District regionals): 2023–24

Sandecja Nowy Sącz

- III liga, group IV: 2024–25
- Polish Cup (Nowy Sącz regionals): 2024–25
