= Jürgen Schmid =

German footballer

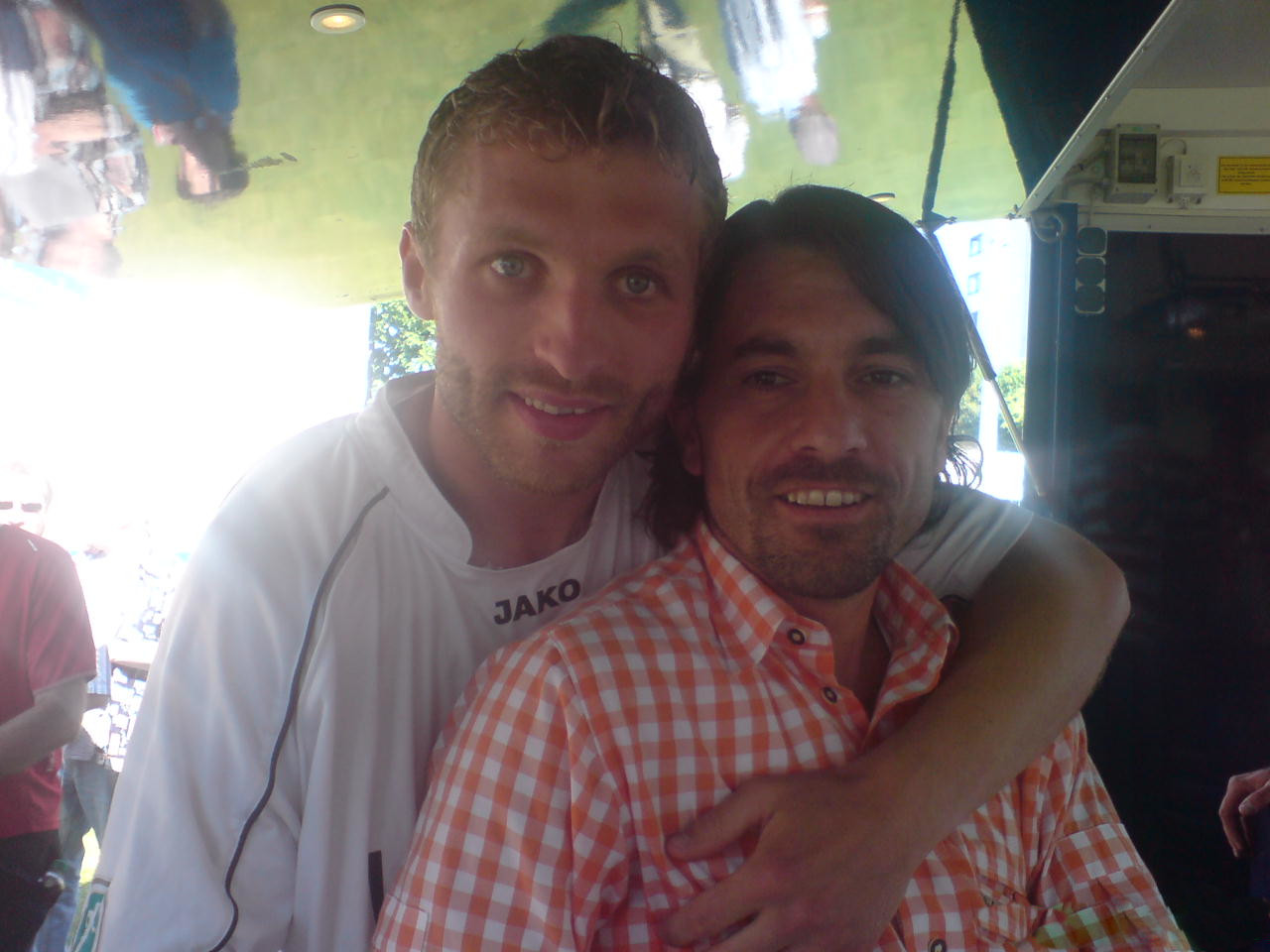
- Harald Gfreiter, Jürgen Schmid

Personal information
- Full name: Jürgen Schmid
- Date of birth: 11 February 1982 (age 44)
- Place of birth: Parsberg, West Germany
- Height: 1.78 m (5 ft 10 in)
- Position: Forward

Youth career
- SV Breitenbrunn
- TV Parsberg
- SG Post/Süd Regensburg
- –2000: FC Bayern Munich

Senior career*
Years	Team	Apps	(Gls)
2000–2002	Bayern Munich (A)	2	(0)
2002–2005	1. SC Feucht	79	(30)
2005–2007	SSV Jahn Regensburg	71	(23)
2008–2009	SV Sandhausen	26	(3)
2009–2012	SSV Jahn Regensburg	80	(8)
Total		258	(64)
- * Club domestic league appearances and goals

Jürgen Schmid (born 11 February 1982 in Parsberg) is a retired German footballer.

After he retired from playing football, Schmid coached ASV Neumarkt and SV Breitenbrunn while he operated a dairy farm with his brother in Matzelsburg, near Breitenbrunn, Upper Palatinate.
