= Carlos Jacques =

Uruguayan footballer (born 1982)

Personal information
- Full name: Carlos Andrés Jacques Coelho
- Date of birth: 11 February 1982 (age 44)
- Place of birth: Artigas, Uruguay
- Height: 1.80 m (5 ft 11 in)
- Position: Midfielder

Team information
- Current team: Boston River

Youth career
- 1998: Peñarol

Senior career*
Years	Team	Apps	(Gls)
1999–2003	Peñarol	?	(?)
2002	→ Bella Vista (loan)	?	(?)
2003–2004	Basáñez	8	(0)
2004–2005	Boston River	?	(?)
2007	Platense	?	(?)
2008–2010	Sitges	?	(?)
2010–2013	Sant Julià	?	(?)
2013–2014	Boston River	?	(? 2015-2016 A.E. La Munia)

International career
1997	Uruguay U15	?	(?)
1999	Uruguay U17	4	(0)
2001	Uruguay U20	?	(?)
- * Club domestic league appearances and goals

Carlos Andrés Jacques Coelho (born 11 February 1982) is an Uruguayan footballer who plays for Boston River in the Uruguayan Segunda División, as a midfielder.

== Career ==
Jacques began his senior career at Peñarol in 1999, moving to loan to Bella Vista in 2002 and being free in January 2003. He signed for Sant Julià in 2010 after several years in lower Uruguayan clubs and UE Sitges, a Spanish team belonging to the Catalan regional divisions.
