= Juan Estrada =

Argentine footballer

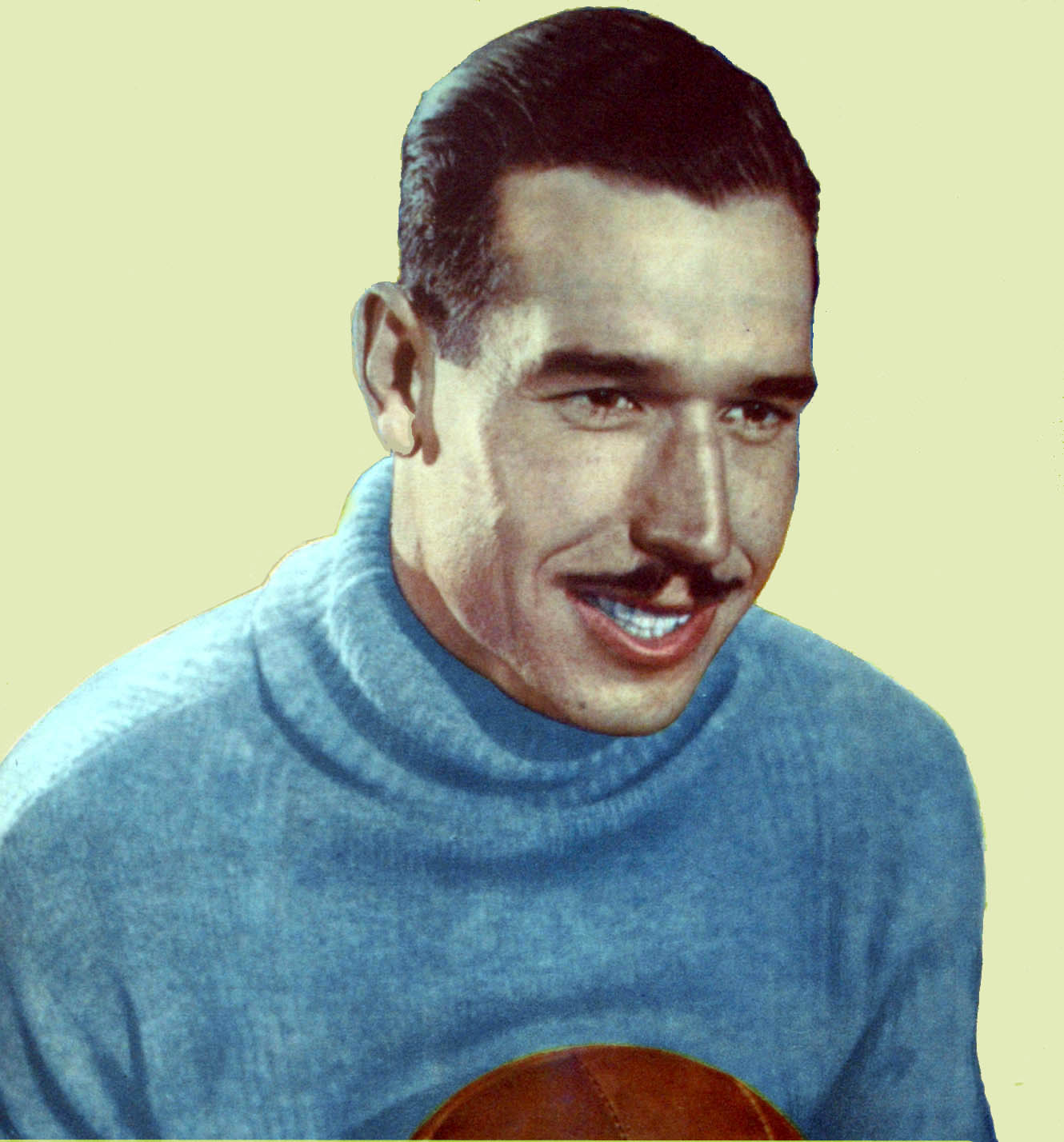
- Estrada in 1940

Personal information
- Full name: Juan Alberto Estrada
- Date of birth: 28 October 1912
- Place of birth: San Pedro, Argentina
- Date of death: 28 May 1985 (aged 72)
- Position: Goalkeeper

Youth career
- Sportivo Palermo

Senior career*
Years	Team	Apps	(Gls)
1933–1937	Huracán	102	(0)
1938–1943	Boca Juniors	139	(0)
1944–?	Defensor		

International career
1936–1941	Argentina	18	(0)
- * Club domestic league appearances and goals

Juan Alberto Estrada (28 October 1912 – 28 May 1985) was an Argentine football goalkeeper who won two Copa América championships with the Argentina national team and two league titles with Boca Juniors.

== Playing career ==
=== Club ===
Estrada began his career with Sportivo Palermo, in 1933 he joined Huracán where he made 102 league appearances for the club before his transfer to Boca Juniors at the end of the 1937 season.

Estrada made his debut for Boca on 3 April 1938 in a 1–1 away draw with Ferro Carril Oeste. He went on to win two league championships with the club in 1940 and 1943. He made a total of 142 appearances for the club in all competitions before his departure in October 1943.

Estrada ended his playing career in Uruguay playing for Defensor. During the 1944 season he made a club record five penalty saves.

=== International ===
Estrada made 18 appearances for the Argentina national team between 1936 and 1941. He played in two editions of Copa América. He was on the winning team in 1937 in Argentina and again in 1941 in Chile.

== Honours ==
Boca Juniors

- Primera División: 1940, 1943

Argentina national team

- Copa América: 1937, 1941
