= Adrian Napierała =

Polish footballer and manager

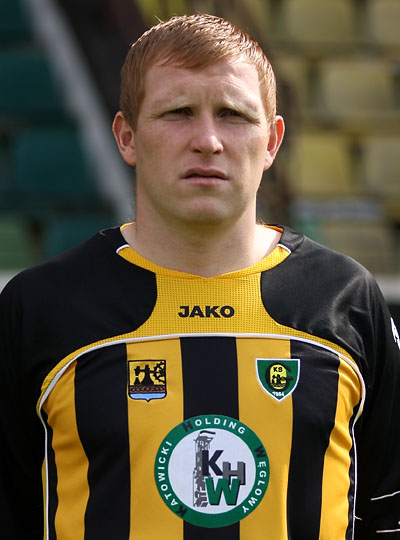

Personal information
- Date of birth: 16 February 1982 (age 44)
- Place of birth: Gorzów Wielkopolski, Poland
- Height: 1.87 m (6 ft 1 1/2 in)
- Position: Defender

Team information
- Current team: GKS Katowice II (manager); MKS Lędziny (manager)

Senior career*
| Years | Team | Apps | (Gls) |
- Warta Wawrów
| 1996–1999 | MSP Szamotuły | | |
| 2000 | Aluminium Konin | | |
| 2000–2002 | ŁKS Łódź | 9 | (0) |
| 2003 | Piotrcovia | 13 | (0) |
| 2003–2004 | Pogoń Szczecin | 12 | (0) |
| 2004–2008 | Jagiellonia Białystok | 58 | (3) |
| 2008–2014 | GKS Katowice | 111 | (10) |
| 2014–2015 | Puszcza Niepołomice | 27 | (3) |

International career
| 1999 | Poland U16 | | |
| 2001 | Poland U18 | | |

Managerial career
- 2015–2016: GKS Katowice II (assistant)
- 2016–2017: GKS Katowice II
- 2017–2023: MKS Lędziny
- 2023–: GKS Katowice II
- 2024–: MKS Lędziny
Medal record
Men's football
Representing Poland
UEFA European Under-18 Championship
| Winner | 2001 Finland |
UEFA European Under-16 Championship
| Runner-up | 1999 Czech Republic |
- * Club domestic league appearances and goals

Adrian Napierała (born 16 February 1982) is a Polish professional football manager and former player. He is currently in charge of GKS Katowice's reserve team and MKS Lędziny.

== Club career ==
In February 2003, he moved to Piotrcovia Piotrków Trybunalski.

In June 2004, he joined Jagiellonia Białystok on a four-year contract.

In July 2008, he left Jagiellonia for GKS Katowice.

== International career ==
He was part of the Poland U16 team that placed second at the UEFA U-16 Championship in 1999, as well as the U18s that won the UEFA U-18 Championship in 2001.

== Honours ==
=== Player ===
Pogoń Szczecin

- I liga: 2003–04

Poland U16

- UEFA European Under-16 Championship runner-up: 1999

Poland U18

- UEFA European Under-18 Championship: 2001

=== Managerial ===
MKS Lędziny

- Regional league Silesia V: 2021–22

GKS Katowice II

- Regional league Silesia IV: 2024–25
- Polish Cup (Katowice regionals): 2024–25
