= Amorós =

- Locality
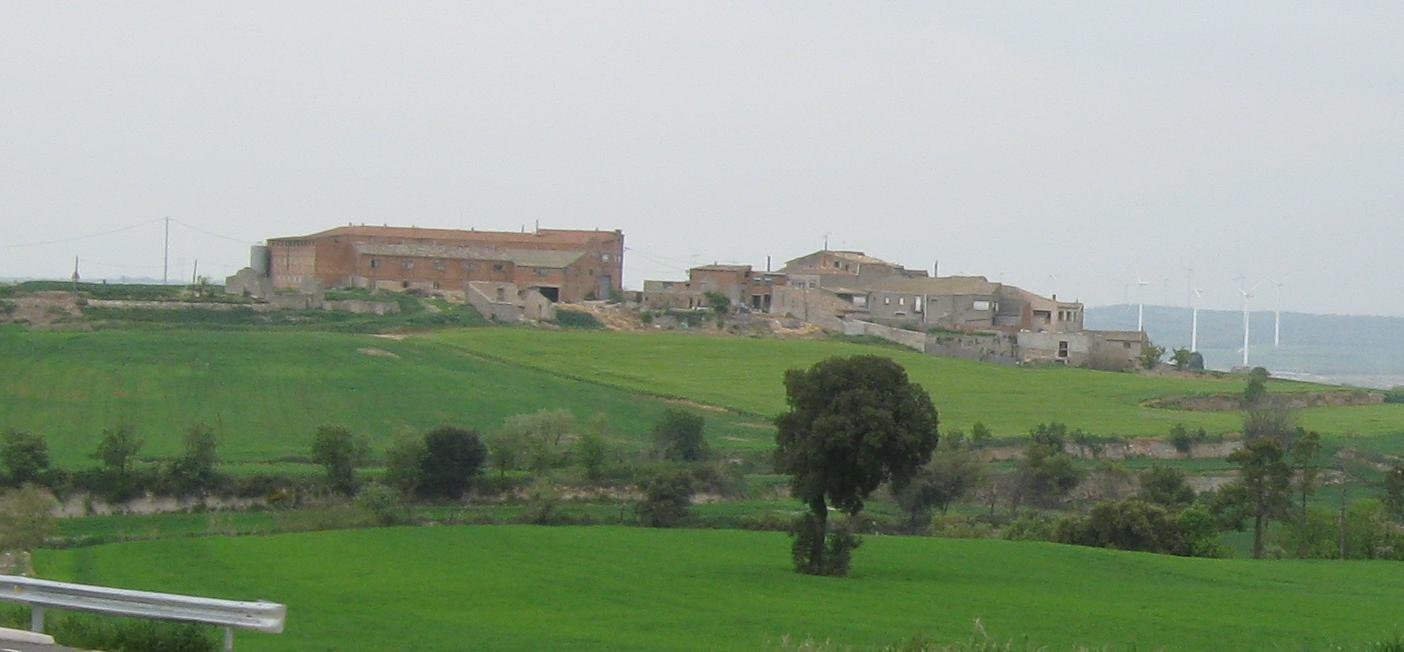

- Location within Province of Lleida Location within Catalonia Location within Spain
- Coordinates: 41°39′11″N 1°25′35″E
- Country: Spain
- Community: Catalonia
- Province: Lleida
- Municipality: Sant Guim de Freixenet
- Elevation: 754 m (2,474 ft)

Population
  - Total: 12

Amorós is a locality belonging to the municipality of Sant Guim de Freixenet, in the Province of Lleida, Catalonia, Spain. As of 2020, it has a population of 12. A standalone municipality in the past, it was absorbed by the municipality of Sant Guim de Freixenet in between 1842 and 1857. The Madoz dictionary described its location as lying "on a plain with free ventilation and a healthy climate".

== Geography ==
Amorós is located 86km east of Lleida.
