= Essa Al-Kuwari =

Qatari footballer (born 1982)

Essa Al Kuwari
Personal information
- Full name: Essa Al Kuwari
- Date of birth: November 11, 1982 (age 43)
- Place of birth: Qatar
- Height: 1.80 m (5 ft 11 in)
- Position: Midfielder

Senior career*
Years	Team	Apps	(Gls)
- Al Sadd
- * Club domestic league appearances and goals

Essa Al Kuwari (born 11 November 1982) is a Qatari footballer who is a midfielder for Al Sadd. He was a member of the Qatar national football team.
