= Koly Kanté =

Malian former footballer

Personal information
- Date of birth: 11 November 1982 (age 43)
- Place of birth: Bamako, Mali
- Height: 1.78 m (5 ft 10 in)
- Position: Defender

Team information
- Current team: Belasitsa Petrich
- Number: 22

Senior career*
Years	Team	Apps	(Gls)
1998–1999	Centre Salif Keita	?	(?)
1999–2004	AS Angoulême		
2004–2007	Tours FC	73	(2)
2008–2010	Belasitsa Petrich		
2010–2011	UA Cognac		

International career
- Mali
- * Club domestic league appearances and goals

Koly Kanté (born 11 November 1982) is a Malian former footballer who played as a defender.
