= Gustavo Ramírez (footballer, born 1984) =

Paraguayan footballer

Personal information
- Full name: Gustavo René Ramírez López
- Date of birth: 9 January 1984 (age 42)
- Place of birth: Choré, Paraguay
- Height: 1.72 m (5 ft 8 in)
- Position: Forward

Senior career*
Years	Team	Apps	(Gls)
1999	General Caballero ZC		
2000	1º de Marzo		
2001–2002	Libertad		
2003	Sportivo Trinidense		
2004–2006	Fernando de la Mora	20	(2)
2007	3 de Febrero		
2008	O'Higgins	1	(0)
2008	Sol de América	7	(0)
2008	12 de Octubre	1	(0)
- * Club domestic league appearances and goals

Gustavo René Ramírez López (Note: In this Spanish name, the first or paternal surname is Ramírez and the second or maternal family name is López.) (born 9 January 1984 in Asunción, Paraguay), known as Gustavo Ramírez, is a Paraguayan former footballer who played as a forward.

== Teams ==
- (Paraguay) General Caballero (Zeballos Cue) 1999
- (Paraguay) 1º de Marzo 2000
- (Paraguay) Libertad 2001–2002
- (Paraguay) Sportivo Trinidense 2003
- (Paraguay) Fernando de la Mora 2004–2006
- (Paraguay) 3 de Febrero 2007
- (Chile) O'Higgins 2008
- (Paraguay) Sol de América 2008
- (Paraguay) 12 de Octubre 2008
