= Walker (Brazilian footballer) =

Brazilian footballer (born 1982)

Personal information
- Full name: Walker Américo Frônio
- Date of birth: 15 February 1982 (age 44)
- Place of birth: Americana, Brazil
- Height: 1.77 m (5 ft 10 in)
- Position: Midfielder

Youth career
- –1999: Guarani
- 1999–2000: Ajax

Senior career*
Years	Team	Apps	(Gls)
2002–2004	Ajax	0	(0)
2000–2002	→ Jong Ajax	?	(?)
2002–2003	→ Germinal Beerschot (loan)	23	(1)
2003–2004	→ Jong Ajax	10	(?)
2006	Atlético Mineiro	23	(0)
2006–2007	Juventude	?	(?)
2007–2008	Náutico	?	(?)
2008–2010	Itumbiara	?	(?)
2010	Juventude	16	(0)
2010	Rio Claro	22	(0)
2011	Santo André	1	(0)
2011	Sertãozinho	0	(0)
2012	Botafogo SP	9	(0)
2013	Rio Claro	16	(?)
2013–2015	Batatais	12	(0)
2015	Independente	?	(?)
- * Club domestic league appearances and goals as of 6 April 2014

Walker Américo Frônio (born 15 February 1982), commonly known as Walker, is a former Brazilian footballer who last played as a midfielder for Brazilian Paulista B club Independente.

== Career ==
In 1999, Walker joined the Ajax Youth Academy coming from Guarani, he was crowned World Champions with the Brazil U-17 at the 1999 FIFA U-17 World Championship. That same year his Guarani youth team won the South American championship for under-17 teams. In July 2000, Walker Américo Frônio signed with Ajax. In 2001 and in 2002, Walker won the Dutch reserves competition title in the Beloften Eredivisie with Jong Ajax. He also made a great impression when he helped the reserves team to a semi-final appearance in the KNVB Cup in 2002. During the 2002–03 season, Walker played on loan of the Belgian satellite club Germinal Beerschot in Antwerp making a total of 21 appearances while scoring one goal. On 6 January his contract was terminated and he returned to Brazil where he played for Atlético Mineiro. He then continued his career playing for Juventude, Náutico, Itumbiara, Rio Claro, Santo André, Sertãozinho and Botafogo SP.

== Honours ==
=== Club ===
Jong Ajax

- Beloften Eredivisie (2): 2001, 2002

=== International ===
Brazil U-17

- FIFA U-17 World Championship (1): 1999
