= Praiwet Wanna =

Thai footballer (born 1983)

Personal information
- Full name: Praiwet Wanna
- Date of birth: May 23, 1983 (age 43)
- Place of birth: Nakhon Phanom, Thailand
- Height: 1.68 m (5 ft 6 in)
- Position: Midfielder

Senior career*
Years	Team	Apps	(Gls)
2006–2009	Thai Honda		
2010–2012	Chainat		
2012	Roi Et United		
2013	Rayong United		
2014	Phayao		
2015	Uttaradit		
2015	Samut Sakhon		
2016	Uttaradit		

International career
1998–1999	Thailand U17		
2002	Thailand U20		
- * Club domestic league appearances and goals as of 19 October 2012

Praiwet Wanna (Thai ไปรเวท วันนา; born May 23, 1983), simply known as Ti (Thai: ตี้), is a Thai professional footballer who plays as a midfielder.

== Career ==
He played for club side Rayong United in 2013 and played for Uttaradit in 2016.

== Honours ==
Thailand U20

- AFF U-20 Youth Championship: 2002
