= 2000 CAF Champions League =

Tournament details
- Dates: 30 January – 17 December
- Teams: 45 (from 45 associations)

Final positions
- Champions: (Ghana) Hearts of Oak (1st title)
- Runners-up: (Tunisia) ES Tunis

Tournament statistics
- Matches played: 97
- Goals scored: 270 (2.78 per match)

The 2000 CAF Champions League was the 36th edition of Africa's premier club football tournament organized by the Confederation of African Football (CAF), and the 4th edition under the CAF Champions League format. Hearts of Oak SC of Ghana defeated ES Tunis of Tunisia in the final to win their first title.

== Qualifying rounds ==
=== Preliminary round ===
Team 1	Agg.	Team 2	1st leg	2nd leg
Tusker FC (Kenya)	2–2 (6–5 p)	(Eritrea) Red Sea FC	1–1	1–1
SC Villa (Uganda)	2–5	(Ethiopia) Saint George	2–2	0–3
Vital'O FC (Burundi)	5–0	(Malawi) Bata Bullets	4–0	1–0
Dragons de l'Ouémé (Benin)	3–1	(The Gambia) Gambia Ports Authority FC	2–0	1–1
Sporting Praia (Cape Verde)	2–4	(Central African Republic) Tempête Mocaf	2–3	0–1
Primeiro de Agosto (Angola)	5–0	(Equatorial Guinea) Akonangui	4–0	1–0
Horoya AC (Guinea)	3–1	(Guinea-Bissau) Sporting Bissau	2–0	1–1
Notwane FC (Botswana)	3–5	(Namibia) Black Africa SC	1–1	2–4
AS de Vacoas-Phoenix (Mauritius)	3–2^{1}	(Seychelles) St.-Michel United	1–1	2–1
AS Fortior (Madagascar)	0–0 (2–3 p)	(Lesotho) LDF	0–0	0–0
Al Ahli Tripoli (Libya)	6–1	(Niger) Olympic Niamey	4–0	2–1
APR FC (Rwanda)	2–2 (3–2 p)	(Chad) Renaissance FC	1–1	1–1
Ferroviário de Maputo (Mozambique)	3–3 (a)	(Tanzania) Prisons FC	1–0	2–3

^{1} AS de Vacoas-Phoenix were ejected from the competition for fielding an ineligible player.

=== First round ===
Team 1	Agg.	Team 2	1st leg	2nd leg
Raja Casablanca (Morocco)	5–3	(Benin) Dragons de l'Ouémé	3–1	2–2
MC Alger (Algeria)	2–6	(Senegal) Jeanne d'Arc	1–1	1–5
Al Ahly (Egypt)	3–2	(Kenya) Tusker FC	3–1	0–1
Saint George (Ethiopia)	3–4	(Burundi) Vital'O FC	1–2	2–2
ES Tunis (Tunisia)	10–0	(Rwanda) APR FC	7–0	3–0 (awd.)^{1}
ASFA Yennenga (Burkina Faso)	3–3 (a)	(Mali) Djoliba AC	2–2	1–1
Lobi Stars (Nigeria)	3–1	(Central African Republic) Tempête Mocaf	2–0	1–1
Vita Club Mokanda (Republic of the Congo)	2–5	(Angola) Primeiro de Agosto	2–1	0–4
Hearts of Oak (Ghana)	4–3	(Guinea) Horoya AC	2–1	2–2
DC Motema Pembe (Democratic Republic of the Congo)	w/o^{2}	(Namibia) Black Africa SC	–	–
Highlanders FC (Zimbabwe)	3–0	(Seychelles) St.-Michel United	1–0	2–0
Sable FC (Cameroon)	3–2	(Gabon) FC 105 Libreville	2–1	1–1
US Stade Tamponnaise (Réunion)	1–5	(Zambia) Nkana FC	1–2	0–3
Mamelodi Sundowns (South Africa)	6–2	(Lesotho) LDF	2–1	4–1
Africa Sports (Ivory Coast)	6–0	(Libya) Al Ahli Tripoli	4–0	2–0
Al-Hilal (Sudan)	2–2 (4–5 p)	(Mozambique) Ferroviário de Maputo	1–1	1–1

^{1} APR FC withdrew after the first leg; they were banned from CAF competitions for three years and fined $4000.
^{2} Black Africa SC withdrew.

=== Second round ===
Team 1	Agg.	Team 2	1st leg	2nd leg
Raja Casablanca (Morocco)	2–2 (a)	(Senegal) Jeanne d'Arc	2–1	0–1
Al Ahly (Egypt)	4–2	(Burundi) Vital'O FC	3–0	1–2
ES Tunis (Tunisia)	4–3	(Mali) Djoliba AC	3–2	1–1
Lobi Stars (Nigeria)	2–1	(Angola) Primeiro de Agosto	1–1	1–0
Hearts of Oak (Ghana)	4–3	(Democratic Republic of the Congo) DC Motema Pembe	4–1	0–2
Highlanders FC (Zimbabwe)	3–3 (3–4 p)	(Cameroon) Sable FC	3–0	0–3
Nkana FC (Zambia)	1–1 (a)	(South Africa) Mamelodi Sundowns	1–1	0–0
Africa Sports (Ivory Coast)	7–1	(Mozambique) Ferroviário de Maputo	5–0	2–1

== Group stage ==
Key to colours in group tables
Group winners advance to the Knockout stage

=== Group A ===
Pos	Team	Pld	W	D	L	GF	GA	GD	Pts	Qualification	ESP	SUN	AFR	SAB
1	(Tunisia) ES Tunis	6	4	0	2	12	7	+5	12	Final	—	3–2	2–0	4–0
2	(South Africa) Mamelodi Sundowns	6	4	0	2	11	11	0	12		2–0	—	2–0	2–1
3	(Ivory Coast) Africa Sports	6	3	1	2	12	8	+4	10		2–1	6–1	—	3–1
4	(Cameroon) Sable FC	6	0	1	5	5	14	−9	1		1–2	1–2	1–1	—

Rules for classification: Group stage tiebreakers

=== Group B ===
Pos	Team	Pld	W	D	L	GF	GA	GD	Pts	Qualification	HEA	AHL	LOB	JEA
1	(Ghana) Hearts of Oak	6	4	2	0	12	5	+7	14	Final	—	2–1	2–0	1–1
2	(Egypt) Al Ahly	6	2	2	2	10	9	+1	8		1–1	—	3–1	3–1
3	(Nigeria) Lobi Stars	6	2	1	3	7	9	−2	7		0–2	3–1	—	3–1
4	(Senegal) Jeanne d'Arc	6	0	3	3	6	12	−6	3		2–4	1–1	0–0	—

Rules for classification: Group stage tiebreakers

== Final ==
2 December 2000
--:-- UTC+1

ES Tunis (Tunisia)	1–2	(Ghana) Hearts of Oak
Zitouni 36'		Addo 52'; Kuffour 79'

Stade El Menzah, Tunis
Attendance: 30,000
Referee: Lim Kee Chong (Mauritius)
17 December 2000
--:-- UTC+0

Hearts of Oak (Ghana)	3–1^{1}	(Tunisia) ES Tunis
Kuffour 83', 89'; Addo 90'		Gabsi 18'

Ohene Djan Stadium, Accra
Attendance: 45,000
Referee: Robin Williams (South Africa)

^{1} The match was interrupted for 18 minutes at 75' with ES Tunis leading 1–0 after teargas was fired into a rioting crowd by police, with one canister landing in the VIP box.ES Tunis protested against the result, but the protest was rejected. It was also marred by the antics of Espérance's goalkeeper Chokri El Ouaer who deliberately injured himself with the intent to get the game abandoned. He was banned for one year by CAF for gamesmanship after the game.

== Top goalscorers ==
The top scorers from the 2000 CAF Champions League are as follows:

Rank	Name	Team	Goals
1	(Ghana) Emmanuel Osei Kuffour	(Ghana) Hearts of Oak	10
2	(Angola) Isaac	(Angola) Primeiro de Agosto	6
2	(Egypt) Alaa Ibrahim	(Egypt) Al Ahly	6
2	(Tunisia) Ali Zitouni	(Tunisia) ES Tunis	6
5	(Ghana) Ishmael Addo	(Ghana) Hearts of Oak	5
6	(Egypt) Ibrahim Said	(Egypt) Al Ahly	4
6	(Ivory Coast) Alhassane Issoufou	(Ivory Coast) Africa Sports	4
6	(Ivory Coast) Fadel Keïta	(Ivory Coast) Africa Sports	4
6	(Senegal) Mamadou Ali Diallo	(Senegal) Jeanne d'Arc	4
10	(South Africa) Daniel Mudau	(South Africa) Mamelodi Sundowns	3
