= Daouda Compaoré =

Burkinabé footballer

Personal information
- Full name: Daouda Compaoré
- Date of birth: January 6, 1973 (age 53)
- Place of birth: Ouagadougou, Upper Volta
- Position: Goalkeeper

Team information
- Current team: ASFA Yennega
- Number: 1

Senior career*
Years	Team	Apps	(Gls)
2003–2004	K.V.C. Westerlo		
2004–	ASFA Yennega		

International career^{‡}
2004	Burkina Faso	6	(0)
- * Club domestic league appearances and goals ‡ National team caps and goals as of June 28, 2008

Daouda Compaoré (born January 6, 1973) is a Burkinabé football player who currently plays for ASFA Yennega as a goalkeeper.

== Career ==
Compaoré has played for K.V.C. Westerlo in the past.

== International ==
He was part of the Burkinabé 2004 African Nations Cup team, who finished bottom of their group in the first round of competition, thus failing to secure qualification for the quarter-finals.

== Clubs ==
- 2003-2004 K.V.C. Westerlo
- 2004–present ASFA Yennega

== Privates ==
Daouda's younger brother Djibril Compaoré played with him for ASFA Yennega and is former member of the Burkina Faso national football team.
