= Alejandro da Silva =

Paraguayan footballer (born 1983)

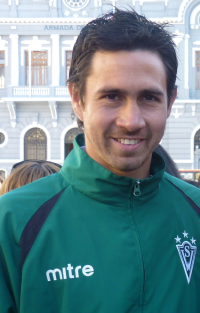

Personal information
- Full name: Alejandro Damián Da Silva Mercado
- Date of birth: 18 May 1983 (age 43)
- Place of birth: Lambaré, Paraguay
- Height: 1.74 m (5 ft 9 in)
- Position: Striker

Senior career*
Years	Team	Apps	(Gls)
1998–2000	Cerro Porteño	0	(0)
2000–2003	Udinese	1	(0)
2003–2005	Foggia	43	(11)
2005	Sambenedettese	10	(1)
2005–2007	Cerro Porteño	62	(23)
2007–2009	Newell's Old Boys	45	(9)
2010	Santiago Wanderers	18	(4)
2011–2013	Cerro Porteño	27	(3)
2013–2014	The Strongest	14	(0)
2014–2015	Rubio Ñu	21	(4)

International career
1999	Paraguay U17		
2007	Paraguay	2	(1)
- * Club domestic league appearances and goals

Alejandro Damian da Silva (born 18 May 1983) is a former Paraguayan football striker.

== Career ==
=== Club career ===
Da Silva started his career with Cerro Porteño before moving to Italy where he played for Udinese, Foggia and Sambenedettese. In 2000 it was discovered that he had entered Italy using a forged passport and banned in July 2001.

In 2005, Da Silva returned to Paraguay to rejoin Cerro Porteño where he played until his transfer to Newell's Old Boys in 2007.

He represented Paraguay U17 at the 1999 FIFA U-17 World Championship.

Da Silva made his debut for the Paraguay national football team in 2007.
