= Waleed Hamzah =

Qatari footballer (born 1982)

Personal information
- Full name: Waleed Hamzah Rasoul Al-Bloushi
- Date of birth: 17 June 1982 (age 44)
- Place of birth: Qatar
- Height: 1.78 m (5 ft 10 in)
- Positions: Striker; winger

Senior career*
| Years | Team | Apps | (Gls) |
| 1999–2011 | Al-Arabi | 177 | (38) |
| 2011–2012 | Al Wakrah | 17 | (1) |
| 2012–2013 | Al Gharafa | | |
| 2013–2014 | Al Ahli | | |
| 2014–2015 | Al Wakrah | | |

International career
| 2000–2008 | Qatar | 37 | (9) |
- * Club domestic league appearances and goals

Waleed Hamzah Rasoul Al-Bloushi is a Qatari footballer who is of Pakistani origin, He was awarded the Asian Young Footballer of the Year by the Asian Football Confederation (AFC) in 1999. He also played at the 2004 AFC Asian Cup.

He plays as a forward for Al-Gharafa Sports Club.

Hamzah played for Qatar at the 1999 FIFA U-17 World Championship in New Zealand. He was named in FIFA's team of the Tournament.

On May 26, 2011, it was announced that Waleed Hamza had signed a 1-year deal to Al Wakrah after not playing for the majority of the season in Al-Arabi.

On July 14, 2012, Hamza move to Al-Gharafa Sports Club on a free transfer.
