= Florian Thorwart =

German footballer

Personal information
- Date of birth: April 20, 1982 (age 44)
- Place of birth: Hagen, West Germany
- Height: 1.85 m (6 ft 1 in)
- Position: Defender

Youth career
- –1998: SC DO-Dorstfeld 09
- 1998–2001: Borussia Dortmund

Senior career*
Years	Team	Apps	(Gls)
2001–2003	Borussia Dortmund	1	(0)
2003–2005	VfB Lübeck	48	(1)
2005–2007	Rot-Weiss Essen	22	(0)
2007–2008	SSVg Velbert	32	(0)
2008–2009	FC Schalke 04 II	10	(1)

International career
	Germany U-20	20	(5)
- * Club domestic league appearances and goals as of 15:26, 22 January 2009 (UTC)

Florian Thorwart (born April 20, 1982, in Hagen) is a German retired football player who last played for FC Schalke 04 II.

== Career ==
He made his professional debut in the Bundesliga for Borussia Dortmund on November 16, 2002, in a game against TSV 1860 München, when he came on as a substitute in the 90th minute.
