= Alex Yi =

American soccer player and coach (born 1982)

Alex Yi 이현
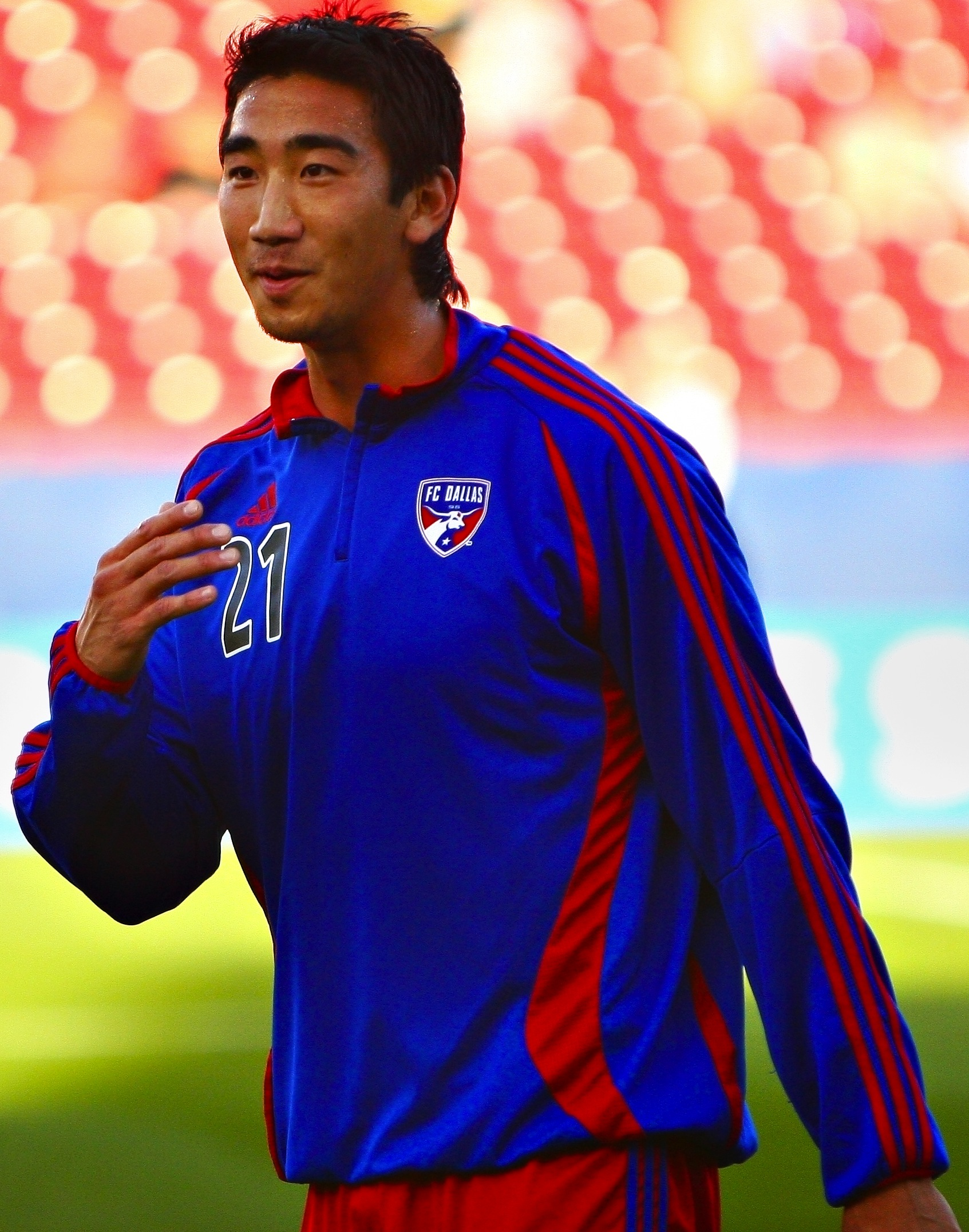
- Yi playing for FC Dallas in 2008

Personal information
- Full name: Alexander Hyun Yi
- Date of birth: February 27, 1982 (age 44)
- Place of birth: Alexandria, Virginia, U.S.
- Height: 6 ft 3 in (1.91 m)
- Position: Defender

College career
Years	Team	Apps	(Gls)
2000–2001	UCLA Bruins		

Senior career*
Years	Team	Apps	(Gls)
2002–2004	Royal Antwerp	17	(0)
2005–2008	FC Dallas	27	(0)
Total		44	(0)

International career^{‡}
1999	United States U17	5	(0)
2001	United States U20	3	(0)

Managerial career
- 2008: Dayton Flyers (assistant)
- 2008–2012: LA Galaxy (academy)
- 2013–2016: San Francisco Dons (assistant)
- 2016–2018: Navy Midshipmen (assistant)
- 2019: Atlanta United (scout)
- 2020: Academy of Art Urban Knights
- 2021: Utah Valley Wolverines (assistant)
- 2022: Utah Valley Wolverines (associate head coach)
- 2024–: Ventura County (assistant)
- * Club domestic league appearances and goals as of 03:42, December 19, 2007 (UTC) ‡ National team caps and goals as of July 16, 2006

- Alex Yi
- Hangul: 이현
- Hanja: 한자
- RR: I Hyeon
- MR: I Hyŏn

Alexander Hyun Yi (Korean: 이싸빅; Korean pronunciation: [i.çʌn] or [i.ɦʌn]; born February 27, 1982) is an American former professional soccer player who last played for FC Dallas of Major League Soccer. He is currently assistant coach for Ventura County.

== Early life ==
Yi was born in Alexandria, Virginia, to Korean-American parents. His father, Kyom Yi, had previously played for the South Korean national team's youth squad.

Yi developed an early interest in soccer through participation in youth leagues and club teams in the Washington, D.C., metropolitan area, notably playing for FC Potomac alongside future Major League Soccer talents such as Kyle Beckerman and Oguchi Onyewu. His exposure to competitive play intensified when he joined the U.S. Soccer Federation residency program at the Bradenton Academy in Florida as part of its inaugural class, training with prominent young players like Landon Donovan and DaMarcus Beasley.

At McDonogh High School in Owings Mills, Maryland, Yi excelled as a defender, earning all-metropolitan, all-league, and all-county honors in 1998 while scoring a goal from his sweeper position that year. He was recognized as a first-team Parade All-American in 2000 and a two-time National Soccer Coaches Association of America (NSCAA) All-American, achievements that highlighted his defensive prowess and solidified his commitment to pursuing soccer at the collegiate level. Yi later transitioned to college soccer at the University of California, Los Angeles (UCLA).

== Club career ==
=== Playing career ===
As a teenager, Yi was a member of Under-17 national team, and as such was part of the inaugural class of the USSF's Bradenton Academy, along with other players such as Landon Donovan, DaMarcus Beasley, and Oguchi Onyewu. Upon graduating, he matriculated to UCLA, where he played college soccer in 2000 and 2001, where he started in 41 games and was named a third team All-American as a sophomore. He was named PAC-10 Player of the Year.

Following his sophomore year Yi left UCLA to pursue a professional career in Europe; he signed with Royal Antwerp of the Belgian First Division, a feeder club of Manchester United, before the start of the 2002–03 season. Yi disappointingly only appeared in four matches for Antwerp in the 2002–03 season, and, after appearing in only seven for the struggling club in the subsequent season, was released from his contract to pursue opportunities in America.

Yi was coveted by several teams upon his return to the United States, most notably his hometown D.C. United, but was eventually allocated to FC Dallas through a weighted lottery on January 12, 2005.

=== Coaching career ===
Alex Yi retired from soccer in April 2008. He struggled with injury and decided to head back to school, applying to UCLA. Eventually, he was hired as an assistant coach at the University of Dayton.

== International career ==
Yi has played for the U17, U20, and U23 United States youth national teams, and played in the 1999 and 2001 Football World Youth Championship. His father, Kyom Yi, played for the South Korean national team at the youth level.

== Honours ==
United States U17

- FIFA U-17 World Cup fourth place: 1999
