= Boureima Maïga =

Burkinabé footballer

Bureima Maïga
Personal information
- Full name: Boureima Maïga
- Date of birth: November 15, 1983 (age 42)
- Place of birth: Bobo Dioulasso, Upper Volta
- Height: 1.72 m (5 ft 8 in)
- Position: Midfielder

Team information
- Current team: Lance FC de Réo
- Number: 7

Youth career
- 1997–1999: Planète Champion

Senior career*
Years	Team	Apps	(Gls)
2000–2002	Planète Champion		
2002–2005	KSC Lokeren	16	(1)
2005–2006	R.E. Bertrix	20	(5)
2006–2007	KRC Waregem	20	(0)
2007–2008	K.V. Oostende	19	(1)
2008–2009	Talba Sport de Bassinko	17	(4)
2009–2010	KMSK Deinze	10	(2)
2010–	Lance FC de Réo		

International career
2001–2009	Burkina Faso	3	(1)
- * Club domestic league appearances and goals

Boureima Maïga (born November 15, 1983, in Bobo Dioulasso) is a Burkinabé football player who currently plays for Lance FC de Réo.

== Career ==
Maïga began his career with Planète Champion. In July 2002 he signed a contract with KSC Lokeren. He spent two years with Lokeren, and left in the summer of 2004 to go back to Planète Champion. After only one year with his youth club Planète Champion, he signed in summer 2006 with KRC Waregem. He played 20 games for K. Racing Waregem, then left the club to sign with K.V. Oostende on 6 August 2007. Maïga left after one year and nineteen games, who scores one goal Oostende and moved to KMSK Deinze.

== International career ==
He was a member of the Burkinabé 2003 FIFA World Youth Championship team in United Arab Emirates and 1999 FIFA U-17 World Championship in New Zealand. Maïga is member for the Les Etalons and holds three games there.

== Personal life ==
Maïga, who was born Bobo Dioulasso in Burkina Faso, holds a Belgian passport.
