= Tegwinde Rebeca Compaore =

Burkinabe researcher

Tegwinde Rebeca Compaore is a Burkinabe molecular biologist and virologist.

== Education and career ==
In the United States, Compaore earned her bachelor's degree in biological sciences at the University of Houston–Clear Lake and her master's degree in infectious diseases at the University of Pittsburgh. She pursued her PhD in molecular biology and virology at the University Joseph Ki-Zerbo in Burkina Faso.

She is a senior researcher at Institut de Recherche en Sciences de la Santé (IRSS-CNRST). Her research centers around liver, pancreatic, and biliary cancers caused by infections of Hepatitis B, Hepatitis C, and Helicobacter pylori. She also studies the burden of hepatocellular carcinoma (HCC) in sub-Saharan Africa, where over 80% of HCC cases are associated with Hepatitus B infection. She particularly focuses on biomarker development for the early detection of Hepatitis B-induced HCC.

=== Recognition ===
Compaore received the UNESCO–Equatorial Guinea Fellowship Programme for Young African Women Scientists in a ceremony held on 25 November 2025 in Malabo, Equatorial Guinea. She was awarded a US$25,000 grant for her contributions to the diagnostics of cancers caused by hepatitis viruses and H. pylori.
