= 1999 FIFA U-17 World Championship =

1999 FIFA U-17 World Cup
FIFA U-17 World Championship New Zealand 1999 1999 FIFA I Raro I Te 17 Marama Ao

Tournament details
- Host country: New Zealand
- Dates: 10–27 November
- Teams: 16 (from 6 confederations)
- Venues: 4 (in 4 host cities)

Final positions
- Champions: Brazil (2nd title)
- Runners-up: Australia
- Third place: Ghana
- Fourth place: United States

Tournament statistics
- Matches played: 32
- Goals scored: 93 (2.91 per match)
- Attendance: 216,853 (6,777 per match)
- Top scorer(s): (Ghana) Ishmael Addo (7 goals)
- Best player: (United States) Landon Donovan
- Fair play award: Mexico

The 1999 FIFA U-17 World Championship, the eighth edition of the tournament, was held in the cities of Auckland, Christchurch, Napier, and Dunedin in New Zealand from 10 to 27 November 1999. Players born after 1 January 1982 could participate in this tournament. This was the first FIFA tournament to be held in the Pacific Islands country.

== Venues ==
Auckland	Napier	Christchurch	Dunedin
North Harbour Stadium	McLean Park	Queen Elizabeth II Park	
Capacity: 25,000	Capacity: 21,000	Capacity: 20,000	Capacity: 29,000
1999 FIFA U-17 World Championship is located in New Zealand

New Zealand's capital city Wellington was not allocated any matches as the city's only venue at the time– Athletic Park–was not deemed adequate by FIFA as a match venue.

== Teams ==
Confederation	Qualifying Tournament	Qualifier(s)
AFC (Asia)	1998 AFC U-16 Championship	Thailand; Qatar
CAF (Africa)	1999 African Under-17 Championship	Ghana; Burkina Faso^{1} Mali
CONCACAF (Central, North America and Caribbean)	1999 CONCACAF U-17 Tournament	Jamaica^{1} Mexico; United States
CONMEBOL (South America)	1999 South American Under 17 Football Championship	Brazil; Paraguay^{1} Uruguay
OFC (Oceania)	Host nation	New Zealand
OFC (Oceania)	1999 OFC U-17 Qualifying Tournament	Australia^{2}
UEFA (Europe)	1999 UEFA European Under-16 Football Championship	Spain; Poland; Germany

1.Teams that made their debut.
2.Australia qualified for the tournament after two-leg playoff matches with 3rd Place winner of 1998 AFC U-17 Championship, Bahrain.

== Group stage ==
=== Group A ===
Team	Pld	W	D	L	GF	GA	GD	Pts
United States	3	2	1	0	4	2	+2	7
Uruguay	3	1	1	1	6	2	+4	4
New Zealand	3	1	0	2	3	8	−5	3
Poland	3	0	2	1	3	4	−1	2

10 November 1999
19:30

New Zealand	1–2	United States
Mulligan 16'	Report	Thompson 69'; Donovan 74'

North Harbour Stadium, Auckland
Attendance: 14,103
Referee: Wolfgang Stark (Germany)

11 November 1999
19:30

Uruguay	1–1	Poland
Alvarez 46'	Report	Madej 51'

North Harbour Stadium, Auckland
Attendance: 3,623
Referee: Hichem Guirat (Tunisia)

13 November 1999
13:45

New Zealand	0–5	Uruguay
	Report	Lapolla 42'; Peralta 45+1'; Leal 63'; Martinez 71'; Meneses 77'

North Harbour Stadium, Auckland
Attendance: 10,265
Referee: Costas Kapitanis (Cyprus)

13 November 1999
16:00

United States	1–1	Poland
Donovan 89' (pen.)	Report	Madej 43' (pen.)

North Harbour Stadium, Auckland
Attendance: 10,265
Referee: Robert Troxler Ayala (Paraguay)

16 November 1999
18:00

Poland	1–2	New Zealand
Mierzejewski 88'	Report	Mulligan 53'; Pearce 64'

North Harbour Stadium, Auckland
Attendance: 7,643
Referee: Edgar Rangel Perez (Mexico)

16 November 1999
20:15

United States	1–0	Uruguay
Onyewu 90'	Report

North Harbour Stadium, Auckland
Attendance: 7,643
Referee: Kyros Vassaras (Greece)

=== Group B ===
Team	Pld	W	D	L	GF	GA	GD	Pts
Ghana	3	2	1	0	12	2	+10	7
Mexico	3	2	0	1	5	4	+1	6
Spain	3	1	1	1	7	2	+5	4
Thailand	3	0	0	3	1	17	−16	0

11 November 1999
16:00

Ghana	1–1	Spain
Atiku 45+2'	Report	Mario 90+7'

McLean Park, Napier
Attendance: 4,000
Referee: Toru Kamikawa (Japan)

11 November 1999
18:15

Mexico	4–0	Thailand
Estrada 7'; Galindo 38'; Ramirez 53'; Grijalva 76'	Report

McLean Park, Napier
Attendance: 3,950
Referee: Bruce Edward Grimshaw (New Zealand)

13 November 1999
13:45

Spain	6–0	Thailand
Aitor 35', 44', 90+1'; Crusat 42'; Ernesto 45+1'; Aspas 80'	Report

McLean Park, Napier
Attendance: 5,200
Referee: Noel Bynoe (Trinidad & Tobago)

13 November 1999
16:00

Ghana	4–0	Mexico
Lamptey 38', 75'; Atiku 71', 89'	Report

McLean Park, Napier
Attendance: 5,200
Referee: Bruce Edward Grimshaw (New Zealand)

16 November 1999
16:00

Thailand	1–7	Ghana
Suriya 62'	Report	Dong-Bortey 7', 16', 50'; Addo 22', 28', 52'; Obodai 90+1'

McLean Park, Napier
Attendance: 4,056
Referee: Mark Shield (Australia)

16 November 1999
18:15

Spain	0–1	Mexico
	Report	Vallejo 38'

McLean Park, Napier
Attendance: 4,056
Referee: Byron Moreno (Ecuador)

=== Group C ===
Team	Pld	W	D	L	GF	GA	GD	Pts
Australia	3	2	0	1	4	3	+1	6
Brazil	3	1	2	0	2	1	+1	5
Germany	3	0	2	1	1	2	−1	2
Mali	3	0	2	1	0	1	−1	2

12 November 1999
13:45

Brazil	2–1	Australia
Marquinhos 31'; Carlos Henrique 66'	Report	MacAllister 81'

QE II Stadium, Christchurch
Attendance: 6,000
Referee: Tomasz Mikulski (Poland)

12 November 1999
16:00

Mali	0–0	Germany
	Report

QE II Stadium, Christchurch
Attendance: 6,000
Referee: Byron Moreno (Ecuador)

14 November 1999
16:00

Australia	2–1	Germany
Cansdell-Sherriff 66'; Byrnes 70'	Report	Haas 9'

QE II Stadium, Christchurch
Attendance: 4,000
Referee: Issack Abdulkadir (Tanzania)

14 November 1999
18:15

Brazil	0–0	Mali
	Report

QE II Stadium, Christchurch
Attendance: 4,000
Referee: Edgar Rangel Perez (Mexico)

17 November 1999
16:00

Germany	0–0	Brazil
	Report

QE II Stadium, Christchurch
Attendance: 6,500
Referee: Hichem Guirat (Tunisia)

17 November 1999
18:15

Australia	1–0	Mali
McDonald 23'	Report

QE II Stadium, Christchurch
Attendance: 6,500
Referee: Carlos Batres (Guatemala)

=== Group D ===
Team	Pld	W	D	L	GF	GA	GD	Pts
Paraguay	3	2	1	0	9	2	+7	7
Qatar	3	2	0	1	6	3	+3	6
Burkina Faso	3	1	1	1	4	4	0	4
Jamaica	3	0	0	3	0	10	−10	0

12 November 1999
18:00

Jamaica	0–1	Burkina Faso
	Report	Compaore 12'

Carisbrook, Dunedin
Attendance: 5,173
Referee: Kyros Vassaras (Greece)

12 November 1999
20:15

Paraguay	2–0	Qatar
Fretes 37'; Guzman 57'	Report

Carisbrook, Dunedin
Attendance: 5,173
Referee: Mark Shield (Australia)

14 November 1999
18:00

Burkina Faso	1–2	Qatar
Kabore 57'	Report	Hamza 16' (pen.), 37'

Carisbrook, Dunedin
Attendance: 4,662
Referee: Carlos Batres (Guatemala)

14 November 1999
20:15

Jamaica	0–5	Paraguay
	Report	Ferreira 11'; Da Silva 15', 80' (pen.); Cabrera 30'; Figueredo 43'

Carisbrook, Dunedin
Attendance: 4,662
Referee: Taj Addin Fares (Syria)

17 November 1999
18:00

Qatar	4–0	Jamaica
Hamza 52', 63'; Abdulrahman 69'; Mubarak 90+1'	Report

Carisbrook, Dunedin
Attendance: 2,180
Referee: Costas Kapitanis (Cyprus)

17 November 1999
20:15

Burkina Faso	2–2	Paraguay
Ouedraogo 50', 53'	Report	Cabrera 4'; Ferreira 45'

Carisbrook, Dunedin
Attendance: 2,180
Referee: Wolfgang Stark (Germany)

== Knockout stage ==
Quarter-finals
20 November – Auckland
United States	3
Mexico	2
21 November – Christchurch
Australia	1
Qatar	0
20 November – Napier
Ghana (a.e.t.)	3
Uruguay	2
21 November – Dunedin
Paraguay	1
Brazil	4

Semi-finals
24 November – Christchurch
United States	2 (6)
Australia (pen.)	2 (7)
24 November – Auckland
Ghana	2 (2)
Brazil (pen.)	2 (4)

Final
27 November – Auckland
Australia	0 (7)
Brazil (pen.)	0 (8)
Third place
27 November – Auckland
United States	0
Ghana	2

=== Quarter-finals ===
20 November 1999
16:00

United States	3–2	Mexico
Beasley 38'; Cila 43'; Beckerman 48'	Report	Vallejo 2'; Yañez 70'

North Harbour Stadium, Auckland
Attendance: 7,483
Referee: Carlos Batres (Guatemala)

21 November 1999
14:00

Australia	1–0	Qatar
Di Iorio 55'	Report

QE II Stadium, Christchurch
Attendance: 3,500
Referee: Wolfgang Stark (Germany)

20 November 1999
16:00

Ghana	3–2 (a.e.t.)	Uruguay
Addo 35', 107'; Novegil 45+1' (o.g.)	Report	Olivera 9'; Leal 65'

McLean Park, Napier
Attendance: 5,600
Referee: Edgar Rangel Perez (Mexico)

21 November 1999
16:00

Paraguay	1–4	Brazil
Da Silva 42'	Report	Léo Macaé 26', 37', 56'; Caca 90'

Carisbrook, Dunedin
Attendance: 7,251
Referee: Taj Addin Fares (Syria)

=== Semi-finals ===
24 November 1999
16:00

United States	2–2 (a.e.t.)	Australia
Donovan 36'; Onyewu 52'	Report	Byrnes 2'; McDonald 35'
Penalties
Donovan (penalty scored); Beasley (penalty missed); Convey (penalty scored); Akwari (penalty scored); Thompson (penalty scored); Gregorio (penalty scored); Yi (penalty scored); Cutler (penalty missed)	6–7	(penalty scored) Byrnes; (penalty scored) Di Iorio; (penalty scored) Cansdell-Sherriff; (penalty missed) Srhoj; (penalty scored) North; (penalty scored) MacAllister; (penalty scored) Goulding; (penalty scored) Kennedy

QE II Stadium, Christchurch
Attendance: 5,000
Referee: Byron Moreno (Ecuador)

24 November 1999
19:30

Ghana	2–2 (a.e.t.)	Brazil
Lamptey 66'; Addo 81'	Report	Léo Macaé 26'; Tetteh 28' (o.g.)
Penalties
Essien (penalty scored); Dong-Bortey (penalty missed); Obodai (penalty missed); Nkrumah (penalty scored)	2–4	(penalty scored) Léo Macaé; (penalty scored) Marquinhos; (penalty scored) Eduardo Costa; (penalty missed) Walker; (penalty scored) Ricardo

North Harbour Stadium, Auckland
Attendance: 12,451
Referee: Costas Kapitanis (Cyprus)

=== Playoff for 3rd place ===
27 November 1999
13:15

United States	0–2	Ghana
	Report	Pimpong 35'; Addo 84'

North Harbour Stadium, Auckland
Attendance: 15,675
Referee: Taj Addin Fares (Syria)

=== Final ===
27 November 1999
16:00 UTC+12

Australia	0–0 (a.e.t.)	Brazil
	Report
Penalties
Byrnes (penalty missed); Di Iorio (penalty scored); Srhoj (penalty scored); Madaschi (penalty scored); North (penalty scored); MacAllister (penalty scored); Goulding (penalty scored); Kennedy (penalty scored); Fyfe (penalty missed)	7–8	(penalty scored) Léo Macaé; (penalty missed) Marquinhos; (penalty scored) Eduardo Costa; (penalty scored) Walker; (penalty scored) Ricardo; (penalty scored) Léo Lima; (penalty scored) Bruno Leite; (penalty scored) Souza; (penalty scored) Wellington

North Harbour, Auckland
Attendance: 22,859
Referee: Kyros Vassaras (Greece)

== Winners ==
1999 FIFA U-17 World Championship winners

Brazil
Second title

== Awards ==
FIFA Golden Shoe	FIFA Golden Ball	FIFA Fair Play Award
(Ghana) Ishmael Addo	(United States) Landon Donovan	Mexico

== Goalscorers ==
Ishmael Addo of Ghana won the Golden Shoe award for scoring seven goals. In total, 93 goals were scored by 59 different players, with two of them credited as own goals.

7 goals

- (Ghana) Ishmael Addo

4 goals

- (Brazil) Leonardo Santiago
- (Qatar) Waleed Hamza

3 goals

- (Ghana) Bernard Dong Bortey
- (Ghana) Ibrahim Atiku
- (Ghana) Nathaniel Lamptey
- (Paraguay) Alejandro Da Silva
- (Spain) Aitor Gómez
- (United States) Landon Donovan

2 goals

- (Australia) Mark Byrnes
- (Australia) Scott McDonald
- (Burkina Faso) Issaka Ouedraogo
- (Mexico) Hector Vallejo
- (New Zealand) Dave Mulligan
- (Paraguay) Daniel Ferreira
- (Paraguay) Victor Cabrera
- (Poland) Lukasz Madej
- (United States) Oguchi Onyewu
- (Uruguay) Sergio Leal

1 goal

- (Australia) Dylan MacAllister
- (Australia) Joe Di Iorio
- (Australia) Shane Cansdell-Sherriff
- (Brazil) Caca
- (Brazil) Carlos Henrique
- (Brazil) Marcos Roberto
- (Burkina Faso) Djibril Compaoré
- (Burkina Faso) Ibrahim Kabore
- (Germany) Leonhard Haas
- (Ghana) Anthony Obodai
- (Ghana) Razak Pimpong
- (Mexico) Aarón Galindo
- (Mexico) Felix Grijalva
- (Mexico) Gustavo Ramirez
- (Mexico) Juan Estrada
- (Mexico) Yared Yanez
- (New Zealand) Allan Pearce
- (Paraguay) Diego Figueredo
- (Paraguay) Tomas Guzman
- (Paraguay) Walter Fretes
- (Poland) Łukasz Mierzejewski
- (Spain) Albert Crusat
- (Spain) Ernesto
- (Spain) Jonathan Aspas
- (Spain) Mario
- (Thailand) Suriya Amatawech
- (United States) Abe Thompson
- (United States) DaMarcus Beasley
- (United States) Jordan Cila
- (United States) Kyle Beckerman
- (Uruguay) Alvaro Meneses
- (Uruguay) Horacio Peralta
- (Uruguay) Miguel Lapolla
- (Uruguay) Ruben Olivera
- (Uruguay) Sebastian Alvarez
- (Uruguay) Williams Martínez

Own goal

- (Ghana) Stephen Tetteh (playing against Brazil)
- (Uruguay) Gonzalo Novegil (playing against Ghana)

== Final ranking ==
Rank	Team	Pld	W	D	L	GF	GA	GD	Pts
1	Brazil	6	2	4	0	8	4	+4	10
2	Australia	6	3	2	1	7	5	+2	11
3	Ghana	6	4	2	0	19	6	+13	14
4	United States	6	3	2	1	9	8	+1	11
Eliminated in the quarter-finals
5	Paraguay	4	2	1	1	10	6	+4	7
6	Qatar	4	2	0	2	6	4	+2	6
7	Mexico	4	2	0	2	7	7	0	6
8	Uruguay	4	1	1	2	8	5	+3	4
Eliminated at the group stage
9	Spain	3	1	1	1	7	2	+5	4
10	Burkina Faso	3	1	1	1	4	4	0	4
11	New Zealand	3	1	0	2	3	8	−5	3
12	Poland	3	0	2	1	3	4	−1	2
13	Germany	3	0	2	1	1	2	−1	2
14	Mali	3	0	2	1	0	1	−1	2
15	Jamaica	3	0	0	3	0	10	−10	0
16	Thailand	3	0	0	3	1	17	−16	0
