= Muamer Abdulrab =

Qatari footballer (1982–2021)

Personal information
- Full name: Muamer Abdulrab Awaz
- Date of birth: 20 August 1982
- Place of birth: Qatar
- Date of death: 14 December 2021 (aged 39)
- Place of death: Qatar
- Height: 1.65 m (5 ft 5 in)
- Position: Defender

Senior career*
Years	Team	Apps	(Gls)
1999–2007	Qatar SC		
2007–2009	Al-Sailiya SC		
2009–2010	Al Kharaitiyat SC		

International career
2002–2008	Qatar	5	(0)
- * Club domestic league appearances and goals

Muamer Abdulrab (20 August 1982 – 14 December 2021) was a Qatari footballer who played as a defender for Qatar in the 2004 Asian Cup. He also played for Qatar SC, Al-Sailiya SC, Al Kharaitiyat SC. Abdulrab died on 14 December 2021, at the age of 39.
