= Jacob Nettey =

Ghanaian footballer

Jacob Nettey (born 25 January 1976) is a retired Ghanaian football defender. He is currently the coach of Hearts of Oak reserve team.

== Club career ==
Nettey played for Hearts of Oak from 1994 to 2002 and Heart of Lions from 2003 to 2005.

== International career ==
He was part of the Ghanaian 2000 African Nations Cup team, who exited in the quarter-finals after losing to South Africa. He was the captain of the all conquering Accra Hearts of Oak team that won the 2000 African Champions League. He was also a member of the Ghanaian squad at the 1996 Summer Olympics.

== Honours ==
=== Club ===
Hearts of Oak

- Ghana Premier League: 1996–97, 1997–98, 1999, 2000, 2001, 2002
- Ghanaian FA Cup: 1995–96, 1999, 2000
- Ghana Super Cup: 1997, 1998
