= Daniel Ferreira =

Paraguayan footballer (born 1982)

Personal information
- Full name: Daniel Ferreira Caballero
- Date of birth: 25 September 1982 (age 44)
- Place of birth: Asunción, Paraguay
- Height: 1.79 m (5 ft 10 in)
- Position: Forward

Youth career
- Olimpia

Senior career*
Years	Team	Apps	(Gls)
2002–2004	Olimpia	20	(0)
2003	→ Sport Colombia (loan)		
2004–2006	Sportivo Luqueño	28	(6)
2006–2007	12 de Octubre	40	(12)
2007	Barcelona SC	7	(0)
2008	Tacuary	59	(15)
2009–2011	Sportivo Luqueño	69	(15)
2009	→ Olimpia (loan)	3	(3)
2011	Deportes Copiapó	19	(1)
2012	Real Garcilaso	4	(0)
2013	General Díaz	22	(1)
2014	San Simón	6	(0)
2014	Pacífico FC	9	(8)
2015	Sport Victoria	21	(4)
Total		307+	(65+)

International career
1999	Paraguay U17		
2001	Paraguay U20		
- * Club domestic league appearances and goals

Daniel Ferreira Caballero (born 25 September 1982) is a Paraguayan former footballer who played for several clubs in Chile, Ecuador, Paraguay and Peru.

The son of a former Club Olimpia footballer, Ferreira was a graduate of the club's youth system. He had limited opportunities to play with Olimpia's senior side, and would enjoy success playing as a striker for rivals Sportivo Luqueño.

== Career ==
- (Paraguay) Olimpia 2002–2004
- (Paraguay) Sport Colombia 2003
- (Paraguay) Sportivo Luqueño 2004–2006
- (Paraguay) 12 de Octubre 2006–2007
- (Ecuador) Barcelona 2007
- (Paraguay) Tacuary 2008
- (Paraguay) Sportivo Luqueño 2009
- (Paraguay) Olimpia 2009
- (Paraguay) Sportivo Luqueño 2010–2011
- (Chile) Deportes Copiapó 2011
- (Peru) Real Garcilaso 2012
- (Paraguay) General Díaz 2013
- (Peru) San Simón 2014
- (Peru) Pacífico FC 2014
- (Peru) Sport Victoria 2015

== Personal life ==
His father, Jorge Daniel, is a former Argentine football player for Racing Club de Avellaneda and Paraguayan clubs.
