= Djibril Compaoré =

Burkinabé footballer

Personal information
- Full name: Djibril Compaoré
- Date of birth: August 1, 1983 (age 43)
- Place of birth: Ouagadougou, Upper Volta
- Height: 1.74 m (5 ft 8 1/2 in)
- Position: Striker

Youth career
- 1997–2000: ASFA Yennega

Senior career*
Years	Team	Apps	(Gls)
2000–2009	ASFA Yennega	74	(19)
2010–2011	ASC HLM	6	(0)

International career
2000–2004	Burkina Faso	13	(4)
2001–2003	Burkina Faso	7	(0)
- * Club domestic league appearances and goals

Djibril Compaoré (born 1 August 1983) is a Burkinabé football (soccer) striker who plays for ASFA Yennega.

== Career ==
Compaoré began his career with ASFA Yennega and was promoted to the senior team in 2000.

== International ==
He was two years member of the Burkina Faso national football team and played for his country at 2003 Afro-Asian Games. Compaoré was a member of the Burkinabé team at 1999 FIFA U-17 World Championship in New Zealand.

== Privates ==
Dhibril's older brother Daouda Compaoré played with him for ASFA Yennega and was member of the Burkina Faso national football team.

== See also ==
- List of one-club men
