= Marquinhos (footballer, born October 1982) =

Brazilian footballer

Personal information
- Full name: Marcos Roberto da Silva Barbosa
- Date of birth: 21 October 1982 (age 44)
- Place of birth: São Caetano do Sul, Brazil
- Height: 1.94 m (6 ft 4 in)
- Position: Centre-back

Youth career
- 2000–2001: Corinthians

Senior career*
Years	Team	Apps	(Gls)
2001–2007	Corinthians	55	(1)
2005	→ Atlético Mineiro (loan)	7	(0)
2007–2008	Çaykur Rizespor	8	(0)
2008–2011	İstanbul BB	37	(3)
2012	Botafogo-SP	7	(0)
2012–2013	Guaratinguetá	43	(2)
2014	Comercial-SP	0	(0)
2014–2018	Figueirense	82	(7)
2018–2019	Avaí	39	(0)
Total		278	(13)
- * Club domestic league appearances and goals

Marcos Roberto da Silva Barbosa (born 21 October 1982), known as Marquinhos Silva or just Marquinhos, is a Brazilian retired professional footballer who played as a centre-back.

== Career ==
He started his professional career with Sport Club Corinthians Paulista (Corinthians) where he played for seven seasons 2001 to 2007. He played internationally in Turkey (most notably in İstanbul Büyükşehir Belediyespor commonly known as İstanbul BB) and in Spain.

On 29 April 2020, 37-year old Marquinhos confirmed in his Instagram profile, that he had retired from football.

== Honours ==
Corinthians

- Campeonato Brasileiro Série A: 2005
- Copa do Brasil: 2002
- Campeonato Paulista: 2001, 2003

Figueirense

- Campeonato Catarinense: 2014, 2015

Avaí

- Campeonato Catarinense: 2019
