= Stephen Tetteh =

Ghanaian footballer

Personal information
- Full name: Stephen Tetteh
- Date of birth: April 11, 1982 (age 44)
- Place of birth: Accra, Ghana
- Position: Defender

Youth career
- Hearts of Oak

Senior career*
Years	Team	Apps	(Gls)
- Hearts of Oak

International career
1999	Ghana U-17	6	(0)
2001	Ghana	5	(0)
- * Club domestic league appearances and goals

Stephen Tetteh (born April 11, 1982, in Accra) is a Ghanaian football (soccer) defender, not to be confused with midfielder Stephen Caesar Tetteh (born May 14, 1995, in Accra), is a former player of Hearts of Oak.

== Career ==
Tetteh began his career with Accra Hearts of Oak in the beginning of the 2000 league campaign. He was part of a formidable defence used in the team's continental triumph and treble-trophy season that year. After helping Hearts of Oak win six national league championships and two continental trophies, he left for the United States of America in 2003, where he is currently domiciled.

== International career ==
Tetteh was member of the Ghana national under-17 football team at 1999 FIFA U-17 World Championship in New Zealand, here played six goals and scores one goal. His debut for the Black Stars was on 5 May 2001 against Sierra Leone in the Qualification for the FIFA World Cup 2002.
