= Emmanuel Osei Kuffour =

Ghanaian footballer

Personal information
- Date of birth: 6 April 1976 (age 50)
- Place of birth: Accra, Ghana
- Height: 1.82 m (6 ft 0 in)
- Position: Midfielder

Youth career
- 1992–1993: Mysterious Dwarfs

Senior career*
Years	Team	Apps	(Gls)
1994–1997	Ebusua Dwarfs		
1998–2005	Hearts of Oak		
2002	→ Anzhi (loan)	5	(0)
2005–2006	Tractor Sazi		
2006–2007	Ashanti Gold		
2007–2008	Asante Kotoko		
2008–2009	Power		
2009	Al-Ittihad Tripoli		
2009–2011	Ebusua Dwarfs	28	(3)

International career
1996–2002	Ghana	31	(2)
- * Club domestic league appearances and goals

Emmanuel Osei Kuffour (born 6 April 1976), also known as The General, is a Ghanaian former professional footballer who played as a midfielder. He was named captain of the Ghana Black Stars for the African Nations Cup in 2002 in Mali.

== Career ==
During his career, Accra-born Kuffour represented Ebusua Dwarfs, Accra Hearts of Oak SC, FC Anzhi Makhachkala, Tractor Sazi FC, Ashanti Gold SC, Asante Kotoko FC, Power F.C. and Al-Ittihad Club Tripoli, playing in four countries. Kuffour won the Ghana Premier League six times, the CAF Champions League, the CAF Confederation Cup and the CAF Super Cup.

He gained 31 caps for Ghana and was picked for the squad at both the 2000 and 2002 Africa Cup of Nations, also featuring in the 1996 Summer Olympics football tournament.

=== International goals ===
Scores and results list Ghana's goal tally first.

No	Date	Venue	Opponent	Score	Result	Competition
1.	19 January 1998	Accra Sports Stadium, Accra, Ghana	Mozambique	2–0	3–1	Friendly
2.	15 July 2001	Accra Sports Stadium, Accra, Ghana	Sudan	1–0	1–0	2002 FIFA World Cup qualification
