= Ishmael Addo =

Ghanaian footballer (born 1982)

Personal information
- Date of birth: 30 July 1982 (age 44)
- Place of birth: Accra, Ghana
- Height: 1.77 m (5 ft 10 in)
- Position: Striker

Youth career
- –1999: Hearts of Oak

Senior career*
Years	Team	Apps	(Gls)
1999–2002	Hearts of Oak	71	(64)
2002	→ Bastia (loan)	2	(0)
2002–2004	Maccabi Netanya	48	(13)
2004–2005	Maccabi Tel Aviv	13	(1)
2005	→ Ergotelis (loan)	15	(1)
2005–2006	Enosis Neon Paralimni	1	(0)
2006–2008	Hearts of Oak	53	(39)
2008–2009	East Bengal	4	(2)
2011	Wassaman United	0	(0)
2015	Eleven Wonders		

International career
- Ghana U17
- Ghana U20
2000–2002	Ghana	9	(1)
- * Club domestic league appearances and goals

Ishmael Addo (born 30 July 1982) is a Ghanaian former professional footballer who played as a striker. He is best known for his accomplishments during his career at Ghanaian side Hearts of Oak, but has also spent several years in France, Israel, Greece, Cyprus and India. A diminutive striker with an exceptional turn of pace, Addo's ability to score goals and demoralise the opposition has led to him earning the nickname "baby-faced assassin". Holding the record of overall top scorer in the history of the Ghanaian League (22 goals in a single season), he is considered to be one of the most talented strikers ever to grace the competition. At some point during his career, Addo was named in FIFA's top 100 prospects.

== Club career ==
Addo started his professional football career at Ghana's Hearts of Oak in 1998, where he remained for four seasons, in three of which he finished the country's top scorer. During his spell with the club, he won the 2000 CAF Champions League and 2001 Super Cup, four Ghanaian League championships (1997–98, 1999, 2000, 2001) and two Ghanaian FA Cups (1999, 2000). In his final playing year with Hearts of Oak, Addo broke the Ghanaian League season top-scorer record with 22 goals, thus helping his side win the league and cup double. During that same season, he scored two late, controversial goals for Hearts of Oak to defeat arch-rivals Asante Kotoko 2–1, in a match that was marred by the worst stadium disaster ever to take place in Africa.

After an unsuccessful loan spell at French club SC Bastia, Addo was signed by Israeli side Maccabi Netanya during the summer of 2002. He opened his account for his new club with a hat-trick in a cup game in his second start, and ended up scoring eight goals in 19 league appearances in his debut season. His second season with Maccabi Netanya did not go as smoothly, as he struggled to find the net during a difficult season for the club. His eventual tally of five goals were not enough to save the club from relegation. Addo had however already drawn the attention of Israeli club Maccabi Tel Aviv, joining the side in July 2004. He made an immediate impact at the start of the new season with a goal on his debut in a 2–1 win against Greek club PAOK during the 2004–05 UEFA Champions League third qualifying round. He went on to feature in all six UEFA Champions League group stage matches, without however scoring a goal.

After struggling to establish himself in the Maccabi Tel Aviv first team, Addo was loaned out to Greek Super League club Ergotelis in January 2005 until the end of the season. He scored his only goal in 15 caps for the club on 20 February 2005, in a 2–1 victory over reigning champions Olympiacos. He then moved to Cyprus signing with Cypriot First Division side Enosis Neon Paralimni, but after spending yet another season struggling, he decided to return to Ghana and his first club Hearts of Oak in October 2006.

Addo spent the next two years at the Ghanaian League club adding one more Ghanaian League championship to his palmarès in 2007. He left Hearts of Oak in 2008 and signed with Indian top flight side East Bengal in 2008, joining compatriot Yusif Yakubu at the club. He was released from his contract at the end of the season in 2009, after failing to impress the club, who fielded him as a midfielder, despite the fact he had proven to be more efficient as a striker throughout his career.

After spending the next two years without a club, Addo had a short stint with newly promoted Ghanaian Premier League side Wassaman United. He left the eventually relegated club in 2011 and was once again unattached until January 2015, when he signed with second-tier Ghanaian club Eleven Wonders.

== International career ==
Addo was a key member of the Ghanaian U-17 team that reached the FIFA U-17 World Championship semifinals in New Zealand. He won the golden boot award, scoring seven goals that helped Ghana to an impressive third-place finish.

Addo made his senior debut in July 2000 at the age of 17, also managing to score his first goal against Sierra Leone during the 2002 World Cup CAF qualification final round. He went on to have 9 appearances for the black stars.

== Career statistics ==
=== International ===
Appearances and goals by national team and year
National team	Year	Apps	Goals
Ghana	2000	2	1
Ghana	2001	5	0
Ghana	2002	2	0
Total		9	1

Scores and results list Ghana's goal tally first, score column indicates score after each Addo goal.

List of international goals scored by Ishmael Addo
No.	Date	Venue	Opponent	Score	Result	Competition
1	10 July 2000	Accra Sports Stadium, Accra, Ghana	Sierra Leone	5–0	5–0	2002 FIFA World Cup qualification

== Honours ==
Hearts of Oak

- Ghanaian League: 1999, 2000, 2001, 2002, 2007
- Ghanaian FA Cup: 1999, 2000
- CAF Champions League: 2000
- CAF Super Cup: 2001

Ghana

- FIFA World Youth Championship runners-up: 2001

Individual

- FIFA U-17 World Championship Golden Boot: 1999
- Ghanaian League top scorer: 1999, 2000, 2001

Records

- Most goals scored in a Ghanaian League season: 22 goals
