= List of Bulgarian football transfers summer 2012 =

This is a list of Bulgarian football transfers for the 2012 summer transfer window. Only transfers involving a team from the A PFG are listed.

The summer transfer window opens on 1 July 2012. The window was closed at midnight on 31 August 2012. Players without a club may join one at any time, either during or in between transfer windows.

== Beroe ==
In:

No.	Pos.	Nation	Player
1	GK	BUL	Martin Temenliev (loan return from (Kazakhstan) Caspiy)
6	DF	BUL	Ivo Ivanov (from Levski Sofia)
8	MF	POR	Alberto Louzeiro (from (Cyprus) Aris Limassol)
11	FW	BRA	Rodolfo (from (Brazil) Serra)
14	DF	BUL	Ignat Dishliev (from Lyubimetz 2007)
15	DF	BUL	Georgi Dinkov (loan return from Sliven 2000)
19	MF	BUL	Martin Raynov (loan return from Sliven 2000)
22	FW	BRA	João Sales (from (Brazil) Arapongas)
29	FW	POR	Élio Martins (from (Portugal) Beira-Mar)
77	DF	POR	Pedro Eugénio (from (Portugal) Farense)

Out:

No.	Pos.	Nation	Player
6	MF	NGA	Richard Eromoigbe (released)
7	MF	BUL	Slavi Zhekov (to Vereya Stara Zagora)
8	FW	BUL	Rangel Abushev (to Lokomotiv Plovdiv)
10	FW	BUL	Emil Angelov (to (Turkey) Konyaspor)
11	MF	BUL	Atanas Chipilov (to Slavia Sofia)
13	DF	BUL	Dimitar Vezalov (to Levski Sofia)
17	MF	BUL	Iskren Pisarov (to Minyor Pernik)
27	DF	BUL	Vladislav Yamukov (end of contract)
44	MF	BUL	Viktor Sofroniev (end of contract)
55	DF	BUL	Martin Kavdanski (to Lokomotiv Plovdiv)
71	MF	BUL	Milen Tanev (to (Kazakhstan) Caspiy)
99	GK	BUL	Ivaylo Ivanov (end of contract)

== Botev Plovdiv ==
In:

No.	Pos.	Nation	Player
3	DF	BUL	Asen Karaslavov (from (Germany) Greuther Fürth)
4	DF	BUL	Petar Chobanov (from Spartak Plovdiv)
5	DF	MKD	Boban Grnčarov (from (Belgium) Lierse)
6	MF	BUL	Kostadin Dyakov (from Chernomorets Burgas)
9	MF	BRA	Vander (from (Brazil) Democrata-GV)
10	MF	ESP	Rubén Palazuelos (from (Spain) Deportivo Alavés)
16	MF	CZE	Tomáš Jirsák (from (Poland) Wisła Kraków)
18	FW	BUL	Stanislav Kostov (from CSKA Sofia)
19	FW	BUL	Ivan Tsvetkov (from Levski Sofia)
23	GK	LTU	Ernestas Šetkus (from (Cyprus) Olympiakos Nicosia)
26	DF	BRA	Arthur Henrique (from (Brazil) Santo André)
89	DF	BUL	Stefan Stanchev (from Levski Sofia)
92	FW	BFA	Habib Bamogo (from (England) Doncaster Rovers)

Out:

No.	Pos.	Nation	Player
1	GK	ARM	Armen Ambartsumyan (retired)
2	DF	BUL	Vasil Vasilev (retired)
3	MF	BUL	Dimitar Bayrev (released)
4	DF	BUL	Radoslav Bachev (to Septemvri Simitli)
5	DF	BUL	Nikolay Domakinov (to Rakovski)
6	DF	BUL	Daniel Bozhkov (to Rakovski)
10	MF	BUL	Aleksandar Aleksandrov (retired)
18	FW	BUL	Deyan Hristov (to Montana)
19	MF	BUL	Hristo Telkiyski (to Rakovski)
20	MF	BUL	Nikolay Manchev (released)
21	DF	BUL	Ventsislav Bonev (released)
22	MF	BUL	Valentin Veselinov (to Dunav Ruse)
25	DF	BUL	Martin Dimov (to Montana)
27	DF	BUL	Nikolay Dimitrov (to Haskovo)
30	MF	BUL	Dimo Atanasov (to Lokomotiv Plovdiv)
33	DF	BUL	Emil Argirov (to Rakovski)
39	FW	BUL	Atanas Kurdov (to Lokomotiv Plovdiv)

== Botev Vratsa ==
In:

No.	Pos.	Nation	Player
3	DF	BUL	Martin Vasilev (from CSKA Sofia)
5	MF	BRA	Bruno Vicente (on loan from (Italy) Padova)
6	DF	BRA	Jairo (from (Brazil) América T.O.)
8	MF	BUL	Vladislav Romanov (from Slavia Sofia)
9	MF	URU	Ignacio Lores (on loan from (Italy) Palermo)
10	MF	ITA	Massimiliano Ammendola (from (Italy) Napoli)
11	MF	BUL	Aleksandar Yakimov (on loan from CSKA Sofia)
15	DF	URU	Pablo Caballero (from (Switzerland) Locarno)
16	FW	ARG	Nicolas Celeste (Free agent)
17	FW	BUL	Andrey Atanasov (from (Armenia) Banants)
18	FW	URU	Sasha Aneff (on loan from (Uruguay) Defensor Sporting)
20	DF	BUL	Asen Georgiev (from Levski Sofia)
21	GK	BUL	Mihail Ivanov (from (Italy) Siena)
23	FW	ITA	Roberto Floriano (from (Italy) Tritium Calcio)
—	DF	ITA	Giuseppe Pira (from (Italy) Licata 1931)
—	MF	BRA	Augusto (from (Brazil) Belo Jardim)
—	MF	BRA	Kassio (from (Brazil) América T.O.)

Out:

No.	Pos.	Nation	Player
4	DF	BUL	Rosen Vankov (to (Montenegro) Čelik Nikšić)
6	DF	BUL	Tihomir Naydenov (released)
8	MF	BUL	Svetoslav Valeriev (released)
10	FW	BUL	Branimir Kostadinov (on loan at (Slovakia) Tatran Prešov)
14	DF	BUL	Petar Alyoshev (to Slavia Sofia)
17	FW	BUL	Ivan Kokonov (loan return to Slavia Sofia)
20	MF	BUL	Konstantin Mirchev (to Lokomotiv Plovdiv)
21	MF	BUL	Ivaylo Radentsov (to Spartak Pleven)
24	FW	BUL	Nikolay Vladinov (to Minyor Pernik)
27	FW	BUL	Rumen Rangelov (released)
33	GK	BUL	Veselin Tsvetkovski (to Montana)

== Cherno More ==
In:

No.	Pos.	Nation	Player
4	DF	BUL	Detelin Dimitrov (from Kaliakra Kavarna)
6	MF	BRA	Edenilson Bergonsi (from (Belgium) Standard Liège)
12	DF	BUL	Martin Dechev (from CSKA Sofia)
20	MF	BUL	Stamen Angelov (from Neftochimic Burgas)
37	GK	BUL	Stoyan Stavrev (from Lokomotiv Plovdiv)

Out:

No.	Pos.	Nation	Player
3	DF	BUL	Tsvetan Yotov (released)
12	GK	BUL	Nikolay Kirchev (released)
17	DF	BUL	Yancho Andreev (to Kaliakra Kavarna)
20	DF	BUL	Mihail Lazarov (retired)
77	MF	BUL	Viktor Mitev (on loan at Kaliakra Kavarna)
86	MF	VEN	Marlon Fernández (loan return to (Venezuela) Deportivo Lara)
90	FW	BUL	Rumen Nikolov (to Neftochimic Burgas)
—	FW	BUL	Kristiyan Dimitrov (to Svetkavitsa)

== Chernomorets Burgas ==
In:

No.	Pos.	Nation	Player
8	DF	BUL	Rumen Trifonov (from CSKA Sofia)
11	MF	BUL	Daniel Mladenov (from Levski Sofia)
18	MF	COD	Aurélien Ngeyitala (from (France) Sochaux)
23	MF	POR	Pedro Mendes (from (Cyprus) Doxa Katokopias)
30	MF	BUL	Lachezar Baltanov (from Levski Sofia)
32	MF	BFA	Issouf Ouattara (from (France) Nîmes Olympique)
92	MF	FRA	Gaël N'Lundulu (from (Switzerland) Lausanne-Sport)

Out:

No.	Pos.	Nation	Player
7	FW	ARM	Samvel Melkonyan (to (Armenia) Ulisses Yerevan)
8	MF	BRA	Lourival Assis (to (Azerbaijan) Gabala)
10	MF	BUL	Kostadin Dyakov (to Botev Plovdiv)
25	DF	BUL	Radostin Kishishev (retired)
31	MF	BUL	Dimitar Telkiyski (to Lokomotiv Sofia)
92	MF	MAR	Aatif Chahechouhe (to (Turkey) Sivasspor)
93	DF	COD	Christopher Oualembo (to (Poland) Lechia Gdańsk)
—	DF	BUL	Petar Patev (on loan at Neftochimic Burgas)
—	MF	BUL	Michail Georgiev (on loan at Neftochimic Burgas)
—	FW	BUL	Zhivko Petkov (on loan at Neftochimic Burgas)

== CSKA Sofia ==
In:

No.	Pos.	Nation	Player
1	GK	BUL	Anatoli Gospodinov (from Sliven 2000)
2	DF	FRA	Jérémie Rodrigues (from Lokomotiv Plovdiv)
4	DF	BUL	Mihail Venkov (from Lokomotiv Plovdiv)
8	DF	BRA	Lucas Sasha (from (Brazil) São José)
10	MF	POR	Serginho (from Lokomotiv Plovdiv)
12	GK	CZE	Tomáš Černý (Free agent)
16	DF	CPV	Nilson Antonio (from (Cyprus) AEL Limassol)
18	MF	ARG	Sebastián Sciorilli (from (Argentina) River Plate)
20	MF	ROU	Alexandru Păcurar (from (Romania) Universitatea Cluj)
23	FW	BRA	Michel Platini (from (Romania) Dinamo București)
24	MF	POR	Tengarrinha (from (Portugal) Vitória Setúbal)
29	FW	BRA	Tássio (from Lokomotiv Plovdiv)
33	DF	FRA	Youness Bengelloun (from Lokomotiv Plovdiv)
55	MF	GRE	Ilias Kyriakidis (from Lokomotiv Plovdiv)
—	DF	CUW	Civard Sprockel (from (Cyprus) Anorthosis)
—	MF	BUL	Hristo Yanev (from Litex Lovech)
—	FW	IRL	Cillian Sheridan (loan return from (Scotland) St. Johnstone)

Out:

No.	Pos.	Nation	Player
1	GK	BUL	Zdravko Chavdarov (end of contract)
3	DF	BRA	Ademar (released)
7	MF	ESP	Antonio Tomás (to (Spain) Numancia)
8	DF	BUL	Rumen Trifonov (to Chernomorets Burgas)
9	FW	EQG	Iván Bolado (released)
14	FW	BUL	Stanislav Kostov (to Botev Plovdiv)
16	MF	BUL	Aleksandar Yakimov (on loan to Botev Vratsa)
18	MF	BUL	Boris Galchev (to (Romania) Dinamo București)
21	MF	BUL	Kosta Yanev (released)
22	MF	BUL	Petar Stoyanov (to (Greece) Olympiacos Volos)
23	DF	BUL	Martin Dechev (to Cherno More)
24	DF	NED	Ilias Haddad (released)
26	MF	BUL	Nikolay Dyulgerov (to Lokomotiv Plovdiv)
32	FW	ROU	Georgian Păun (loan return to (Romania) Dinamo București)
92	GK	ALG	Raïs M'Bolhi (loan return to (Russia) Krylia Sovetov)
—	DF	BUL	Aleksandar Dyulgerov (to Lokomotiv Sofia, previously on loan at Montana)
—	DF	BUL	Martin Vasilev (to Botev Vratsa, previously on loan at Akademik Sofia)
—	MF	BUL	Chetin Sadula (to Etar 1924, previously on loan at Kaliakra Kavarna)
—	MF	BUL	Hristo Yanev (to (Greece) Panetolikos)
—	FW	IRL	Cillian Sheridan (to (Scotland) Kilmarnock)

== Etar 1924 ==
In:

No.	Pos.	Nation	Player
1	GK	MNE	Pavle Velimirović (from (Poland) ŁKS Łódź)
5	MF	CHA	Azrack Mahamat (from (Spain) Espanyol)
6	DF	BUL	Tihomir Trifonov (from Montana)
9	FW	BRA	Luiz Eduardo (from Montana)
10	MF	BUL	Ahmed Hikmet (from Vidima-Rakovski)
11	MF	NED	Jasar Takak (from (Netherlands) Cambuur)
12	DF	BRA	Nerylon (from (Brazil) Uberaba)
13	DF	BUL	Kostadin Gadzhalov (from Bdin Vidin)
14	MF	BUL	Chetin Sadula (from CSKA Sofia)
18	DF	ENG	Kasali Casal (from (Hungary) Vasas)
21	MF	CMR	Tiko Messina (from (Spain) Espanyol B)
22	MF	BUL	Krasen Trifonov (from Atletik Kuklen)
23	MF	GLP	Grégory Gendrey (from (France) Paris FC)
28	DF	BUL	Atanas Atanasov (from Spartak Pleven)
29	FW	BUL	Dormushali Saidhodzha (from (Cyprus) AEP Paphos)
30	DF	BRA	Eli Marques (from Lokomotiv Plovdiv)
33	GK	SRB	Nenad Filipović (from (Serbia) Teleoptik)
91	FW	MTQ	Yoan Pivaty (from (France) Viry-Châtillon)

Out:

No.	Pos.	Nation	Player
2	DF	FRA	David Bitsindou (released)
4	DF	BUL	Aleksandar Tomash (retired)
6	MF	BUL	Dzihat Kyamil (to Nesebar)
8	MF	BUL	Hristo Gospodinov (to Lyubimetz 2007)
9	FW	BUL	Aleksandar Ruskov (released)
10	FW	BUL	Todor Kolev (to (Greece) Olympiacos Volos)
11	FW	BUL	Svetoslav Karaivanov (to Lyubimetz 2007)
17	MF	BUL	Diyan Dimov (released)
30	DF	BUL	Ventsislav Yordanov (released)
31	FW	BUL	Georgi Kakalov (to Shumen 2010)
39	FW	BUL	Borislav Kralev (to Marek Dupnitsa)
99	MF	MAR	Youssef Idrissi (to (France) US Feurs)

== Levski Sofia ==
In:

No.	Pos.	Nation	Player
3	DF	FRA	Romain Elie (from (France) Arles-Avignon)
4	MF	BUL	Stanislav Angelov (from (Cyprus) Anorthosis Famagusta)
8	MF	SVK	Roman Procházka (from (Slovakia) Spartak Trnava)
9	FW	POR	João Silva (from (England) Everton)
13	DF	BUL	Dimitar Vezalov (from Beroe Stara Zagora)
14	FW	GHA	Agyemang Opoku (from (Qatar) Al-Sadd)
19	FW	GNB	Basile de Carvalho (from Lokomotiv Plovdiv)
22	MF	BUL	Ilian Yordanov (from Lokomotiv Plovdiv)
24	GK	BUL	Ivaylo Vasilev (loan return from Vidima-Rakovski)
31	MF	BRA	Marcinho (from (Cyprus) APOEL)

Out:

No.	Pos.	Nation	Player
3	MF	NED	Serginho Greene (to (Serbia) FK Vojvodina)
4	DF	BUL	Stefan Stanchev (to Botev Plovdiv)
5	DF	BUL	Ivo Ivanov (to Beroe Stara Zagora)
8	MF	ESP	Toni Calvo (to (Cyprus) Anorthosis Famagusta)
12	FW	BRA	Jose Junior (loan return to Slavia Sofia)
17	MF	BUL	Daniel Mladenov (to Chernomorets Burgas)
19	FW	BUL	Ivan Tsvetkov (to Botev Plovdiv)
22	MF	MKD	Darko Tasevski (to (Israel) Ironi Kiryat Shmona)
24	GK	BUL	Bozhidar Mitrev (end of contract)
25	DF	MLI	Souleymane Diamoutene (released)
41	DF	BUL	Asen Georgiev (to Botev Vratsa)
55	DF	BUL	Yordan Miliev (to (Israel) Ironi Ramat HaSharon)
—	MF	BUL	Lachezar Baltanov (to Chernomorets, previously on loan at Botev Vratsa)

== Litex Lovech ==
In:

No.	Pos.	Nation	Player
3	DF	BUL	Anton Nedyalkov (loan return from Svetkavitsa)
5	DF	BUL	Emil Grozev (loan return from Chavdar Etropole)
6	MF	BUL	Simeon Slavchev (loan return from Chavdar Etropole)
9	FW	BUL	Ismail Isa (from (Turkey) Karabükspor)
10	FW	BUL	Gerasim Zakov (from Kaliakra Kavarna)
11	FW	BUL	Borislav Borisov (loan return from Montana)
13	FW	SEN	Papis Dembo Coly (from (Senegal) Dakar UC)
20	FW	BUL	Kostadin Bashov (from (Cyprus) Alki Larnaca)
24	MF	ALB	Edon Hasani (from (Albania) Vllaznia Shkodër)

Out:

No.	Pos.	Nation	Player
3	DF	BUL	Petar Zanev (to (Ukraine) Volyn Lutsk)
5	DF	FRA	Bernard Itoua (to (Israel) Hapoel Ramat Gan)
6	DF	FRA	Maxime Josse (to (Israel) Bnei Sakhnin)
7	MF	BUL	Hristo Yanev (to CSKA Sofia)
9	FW	BUL	Svetoslav Todorov (to (Ukraine) Hoverla Uzhhorod)
10	MF	BRA	Sandrinho (released)
11	MF	BRA	Thiago Miracema (loan return to (Brazil) Sampaio Corrêa)
99	FW	BRA	Marcelo Nicácio (to (Brazil) EC Vitória)
—	FW	BUL	Yanaki Smirnov (to Spartak Varna)

== Lokomotiv Plovdiv ==
In:

No.	Pos.	Nation	Player
1	GK	BUL	Stefano Kunchev (on loan from Slavia Sofia)
4	FW	BUL	Rangel Abushev (from Beroe Stara Zagora)
5	DF	BUL	Pavel Kovachev (from Kaliakra Kavarna)
6	DF	BUL	Kiril Kotev (from (China) Dalian Aerbin)
7	MF	BUL	Nikolay Stankov (from Dobrudzha Dobrich)
10	MF	BUL	Todor Timonov (from Bdin Vidin)
17	DF	BUL	Kostadin Markov (from Minyor Pernik)
19	MF	BUL	Marin Petrov (from Spartak Varna)
22	GK	BUL	Yordan Gospodinov (from (Romania) Concordia Chiajna)
24	MF	BUL	Konstantin Mirchev (from Botev Vratsa)
26	MF	BUL	Nikolay Dyulgerov (from CSKA Sofia)
33	MF	BUL	Dimo Atanasov (from Botev Plovdiv)
39	FW	BUL	Atanas Kurdov (from Botev Plovdiv)
55	DF	BUL	Martin Kavdanski (from Beroe Stara Zagora)
77	FW	BRA	Diego Ferares (from Chavdar Etropole)
88	MF	BUL	Georgi Stefanov (from Rakovski)
90	DF	CYP	Stelios Demetriou (from (Cyprus) Apollon Limassol)
—	DF	BRA	Eli Marques (from Svetkavitsa)
—	DF	GRE	Georgios Salamastrakis (from (Greece) Panserraikos)
—	MF	GRE	Ilias Kyriakidis (from (Greece) Ergotelis)
—	FW	BRA	Tássio (from (Brazil) Resende)

Out:

No.	Pos.	Nation	Player
1	GK	BUL	Stoyan Stavrev (to Cherno More)
2	DF	FRA	Jérémie Rodrigues (to CSKA Sofia)
4	DF	BUL	Mihail Venkov (to CSKA Sofia)
5	DF	FRA	Youness Bengelloun (to CSKA Sofia)
6	DF	BUL	Tanko Dyakov (to (Kazakhstan) Zhetysu)
7	MF	BUL	Yordan Todorov (to (Greece) Panserraikos)
9	FW	BUL	Lyubomir Tsekov (to Svilengrad 1921)
10	MF	POR	Serginho (to CSKA Sofia)
11	MF	BUL	Ilian Yordanov (to Levski Sofia)
12	GK	BUL	Ivan Karadzhov (released)
19	FW	GNB	Basile de Carvalho (to Levski Sofia)
25	DF	BUL	Angel Yoshev (to (Malta) Ħamrun Spartans)
29	MF	MKD	Dragi Kotsev (on loan at Pirin Gotse Delchev)
33	GK	FRA	Florian Lucchini (to (Greece) Panserraikos)
44	MF	BUL	Lyubomir Vitanov (to (Malta) Ħamrun Spartans)
77	FW	BUL	Zdravko Lazarov (to Slavia Sofia)
87	MF	BRA	Dakson (to (Brazil) Vasco da Gama)
—	DF	BRA	Eli Marques (to Etar 1924)
—	DF	GRE	Georgios Salamastrakis (to (Greece) Panachaiki)
—	MF	GRE	Ilias Kyriakidis (to CSKA Sofia)
—	FW	BRA	Tássio (to CSKA Sofia)

== Lokomotiv Sofia ==
In:

No.	Pos.	Nation	Player
12	MF	BUL	Dimitar Telkiyski (from Chernomorets Burgas)
14	FW	BUL	Dimitar Iliev (from Montana)
18	DF	BUL	Aleksandar Dyulgerov (from CSKA Sofia)
21	MF	BUL	Daniel Gadzhev (from Montana)
23	FW	BUL	Georgi Hristov (from Slavia Sofia)

Out:

No.	Pos.	Nation	Player
17	FW	BUL	Vladimir Manchev (released)
18	DF	BUL	Miroslav Koev (released)
20	MF	SRB	Vladimir Bogdanović (to (Greece) Panetolikos)
23	MF	BUL	Ivo Ivanov (released)
29	FW	BUL	Boris Kondev (to Pirin Razlog)
31	MF	BUL	Aleksandar Mladenov (released)
79	FW	BUL	Andrey Atanasov (to (Armenia) Banants)

== Ludogorets Razgrad ==
In:

No.	Pos.	Nation	Player
9	FW	SVN	Roman Bezjak (from (Slovenia) Celje)
14	MF	NED	Mitchell Burgzorg (from (Netherlands) Almere City)
27	DF	ROU	Cosmin Moți (from (Romania) Dinamo București)
80	DF	BRA	Júnior Caiçara (from (Portugal) Gil Vicente)
91	GK	BUL	Ivan Čvorović (from Minyor Pernik)
99	MF	CIV	Did'dy Guela (from (Germany) Arminia Bielefeld)

Out:

No.	Pos.	Nation	Player
3	DF	SVK	Marián Jarabica (loan return to (Poland) Cracovia)
13	GK	CZE	Radek Petr (to (Czech Republic) Zbrojovka Brno)
27	FW	BEL	Christian Kabasele (to (Belgium) Eupen)
36	MF	MNE	Mladen Kašćelan (loan return to (Poland) Jagiellonia Białystok)

== Minyor Pernik ==
In:

No.	Pos.	Nation	Player
9	FW	BUL	Nikolay Vladinov (from Botev Vratsa)
18	MF	BUL	Iskren Pisarov (from Beroe Stara Zagora)
22	GK	BUL	Boyan Peykov (from (Poland) Zawisza Bydgoszcz)
77	MF	BUL	Yordan Yurukov (from Slavia Sofia)

Out:

No.	Pos.	Nation	Player
32	DF	BUL	Kostadin Markov (to Lokomotiv Plovdiv)
39	MF	ALG	Farid Benramdane (released)
77	MF	BUL	Lyubomir Todorov (to Spartak Pleven)
91	GK	BUL	Ivan Čvorović (to Ludogorets Razgrad)

== Montana ==
In:

No.	Pos.	Nation	Player
1	GK	BUL	Veselin Tsvetkovski (from Botev Vratsa)
3	DF	BUL	Martin Dimov (from Botev Plovdiv)
6	MF	BUL	Anton Kostadinov (from Svetkavitsa)
10	MF	BUL	Petar Petrov (from Bdin Vidin)
16	MF	BUL	Dimitar Petkov (from Bdin Vidin)
17	DF	BUL	Georgi Pashov (from Slavia Sofia)
18	FW	BUL	Deyan Hristov (from Botev Plovdiv)
20	DF	BUL	Martin Kovachev (from Botev Vratsa)
21	MF	BUL	Samir Aess (from FC Bansko)
23	FW	BUL	Spas Georgiev (on loan from Slavia Sofia)
25	DF	BUL	Milen Lahchev (from (Romania) Concordia Chiajna)
26	MF	BUL	Andon Gushterov (from Septemvri Simitli)
27	FW	BUL	Atanas Chipilov (from Slavia Sofia)

Out:

No.	Pos.	Nation	Player
1	GK	BUL	Atanas Arshinkov (to Pirin Razlog)
3	DF	BUL	Emil Koparanov (to Lyubimetz 2007)
5	FW	BUL	Borislav Borisov (loan return to Litex Lovech)
6	DF	BUL	Tihomir Trifonov (to Etar 1924)
9	FW	BRA	Luiz Eduardo (to Etar 1924)
11	DF	BUL	Aleksandar Dyulgerov (loan return to CSKA Sofia)
13	DF	FRA	Boris Deugoué (released)
17	FW	BUL	Dimitar Iliev (to Lokomotiv Sofia)
21	MF	BUL	Daniel Gadzhev (to Lokomotiv Sofia)
22	MF	BUL	Svetlan Kondev (retired)

== Pirin Gotse Delchev ==
In:

No.	Pos.	Nation	Player
4	DF	BUL	Atanas Drenovichki (from Slavia Sofia)
7	FW	FRA	Albin Hodza (from (Italy) Real Nocera Superiore)
9	FW	BUL	Borislav Hazurov (from Bdin Vidin)
10	MF	BUL	Veselin Marchev (from (Poland) Flota Świnoujście)
20	MF	MKD	Dragi Kotsev (on loan from Lokomotiv Plovdiv)
21	MF	BUL	Vasil Panayotov (from Bansko)
30	DF	BUL	Ivan Stoyanov (from Brestnik 1948)

Out:

No.	Pos.	Nation	Player
6	DF	BUL	Veselin Zdravkov (released)
7	MF	BUL	Boris Shindov (released)
9	MF	BUL	Radoslav Mollov (released)
10	FW	BUL	Ivan Ploshtakov (to Rakovski)
20	MF	BUL	Zefir Katunchev (released)
21	MF	BUL	Nikolay Dimirov (released)
23	DF	BUL	Georgi Samokishev (released)
99	FW	BUL	Georgi Karaneychev (to (Moldova) Tiraspol)

== Slavia Sofia ==
In:

No.	Pos.	Nation	Player
1	GK	BUL	Georgi Petkov (from (Cyprus) Enosis Paralimni)
5	DF	BUL	Petar Alyoshev (from Botev Vratsa)
7	MF	JPN	Daisuke Matsui (from (France) Dijon FCO)
8	MF	BUL	Chavdar Yankov (from (Ukraine) Metalurh Donetsk)
15	DF	HUN	Miklós Gaál (from (Russia) Volga Nizhny Novgorod)
17	FW	BUL	Ivan Kokonov (loan return from Botev Vratsa)
22	DF	BUL	Viktor Genev (loan return from (Ukraine) Oleksandria)
25	MF	BUL	Nikolay Chipev (from Vidima-Rakovski)
29	FW	BUL	Vasil Kaloyanov (loan return from Neftochimic Burgas)
44	FW	BRA	Jose Junior (loan return from Levski Sofia)
71	MF	ESP	Hugo López (from (Portugal) Atlético CP)
77	FW	BUL	Zdravko Lazarov (from Lokomotiv Plovdiv)
—	MF	BUL	Atanas Chipilov (from Beroe Stara Zagora)

Out:

No.	Pos.	Nation	Player
1	GK	BUL	Stefano Kunchev (on loan at Lokomotiv Plovdiv)
4	MF	MNE	Ramazan Bišević (to (Serbia) FK Novi Pazar)
5	FW	BUL	Spas Georgiev (on loan at Montana)
7	MF	BUL	Vladislav Romanov (to Botev Vratsa)
8	FW	BUL	Georgi Hristov (to Lokomotiv Sofia)
17	FW	BUL	Nikolay Bozhov (to (Malta) Ħamrun Spartans)
26	DF	BUL	Mihail Milchev (to Spartak Pleven)
35	FW	SRB	Milan Stavrić (released)
44	FW	BRA	Jose Junior (on loan at (Turkey) Adana Demirspor)
83	FW	BUL	Yordan Yurukov (to Minyor Pernik)
—	MF	BUL	Atanas Chipilov (to Montana)

== See also ==
- (Cyprus) List of Cypriot football transfers summer 2012
- (Netherlands) List of Dutch football transfers summer 2012
- (England) List of English football transfers summer 2012
- (Malta) List of Maltese football transfers summer 2012
- (Germany) List of German football transfers summer 2012
- (Greece) List of Greek football transfers summer 2012
- (Portugal) List of Portuguese football transfers summer 2012
- (Spain) List of Spanish football transfers summer 2012
- (Latvia) List of Latvian football transfers summer 2012
- (Serbia) List of Serbian football transfers summer 2012
