= List of Maltese football transfers summer 2012 =

This is a list of Maltese football transfers for the 2012–13 summer transfer window by club. Only transfers of clubs in the Maltese Premier League and Maltese First Division are included.

The summer transfer window opened on 1 July 2012, although a few transfers may take place prior to that date. The window closed at midnight on 31 August 2012. Players without a club may join one at any time, either during or in between transfer windows.

== Maltese Premier League ==
=== Balzan ===
In: Note: Flags indicate national team as defined under FIFA eligibility rules; some limited exceptions apply. Players may hold more than one non-FIFA nationality.

No.	Pos.	Nation	Player
—	MF	MLT	Stefan Giglio (from Tarxien Rainbows)

Out: Note: Flags indicate national team as defined under FIFA eligibility rules; some limited exceptions apply. Players may hold more than one non-FIFA nationality.

No.	Pos.	Nation	Player
7	FW	MLT	Lydon Micallef (on loan to Vittoriosa Stars)

=== Birkirkara ===
In: Note: Flags indicate national team as defined under FIFA eligibility rules; some limited exceptions apply. Players may hold more than one non-FIFA nationality.

No.	Pos.	Nation	Player
1	GK	MLT	Reuben Gauci (from Marsaxlokk)
14	DF	MLT	Patrick Borg (from Marsaxlokk)

Out: Note: Flags indicate national team as defined under FIFA eligibility rules; some limited exceptions apply. Players may hold more than one non-FIFA nationality.

No.	Pos.	Nation	Player
—	FW	MLT	Luke Montebello (to (Italy) A.S. Livorno Calcio)
—	FW	MLT	Terence Vella (on loan to Ħamrun Spartans)

=== Floriana ===
In: Note: Flags indicate national team as defined under FIFA eligibility rules; some limited exceptions apply. Players may hold more than one non-FIFA nationality.

No.	Pos.	Nation	Player
29	GK	NED	Patrick Jansen (from (Netherlands) AGOVV)
8	DF	ENG	Carl Tremarco (on loan from (England) Macclesfield Town)
11	MF	MLT	Trevor Cilia (from Sliema Wanderers)
9	MF	ENG	Aman Verma (from (England) Kettering Town)

Out: Note: Flags indicate national team as defined under FIFA eligibility rules; some limited exceptions apply. Players may hold more than one non-FIFA nationality.

No.	Pos.	Nation	Player
12	GK	GHA	William Amamoo (released)
29	GK	NED	Patrick Jansen (released)
8	MF	ARG	Pablo Doffo (released)
20	MF	SWE	André Grabowski (released)
9	MF	MLT	Manolito Micallef (to Mosta)
13	FW	BEL	Alandson (released)
11	FW	MLT	Malcolm Licari (released)
13	FW	NGA	Onome Sodje (released)
14	FW	MLT	Ivan Woods (to Sliema Wanderers)

=== Ħamrun Spartans ===
In: Note: Flags indicate national team as defined under FIFA eligibility rules; some limited exceptions apply. Players may hold more than one non-FIFA nationality.

No.	Pos.	Nation	Player
—	MF	MLT	Massimo Grima (on loan from Valletta)
—	FW	MLT	Terence Scerri (on loan from Valletta)
—	FW	MLT	Terence Vella (on loan from Birkirkara)
—	FW	BUL	Nikolay Bozhov (from Slavia Sofia)
—	MF	BUL	Lyubomir Vitanov (from Lokomotiv Plovdiv)
—	DF	BUL	Adrian Olegov (from Neftohimik)
—	DF	BUL	Angel Yoshev (from Lokomotiv Plovdiv)
—	DF	BUL	Anton Vergilov (from PFC Chavdar Byala Slatina)
—	FW	MLT	Richard Brightwell

Out: Note: Flags indicate national team as defined under FIFA eligibility rules; some limited exceptions apply. Players may hold more than one non-FIFA nationality.

No.	Pos.	Nation	Player
7	MF	MLT	Rupert Mangion (to Marsaxlokk)
—	FW	MLT	Steven Meilaq (to Gżira United)

=== Hibernians ===
In: Note: Flags indicate national team as defined under FIFA eligibility rules; some limited exceptions apply. Players may hold more than one non-FIFA nationality.

No.	Pos.	Nation	Player

Out: Note: Flags indicate national team as defined under FIFA eligibility rules; some limited exceptions apply. Players may hold more than one non-FIFA nationality.

No.	Pos.	Nation	Player
21	FW	BRA	Tarabai (to (Hungary) Kecskeméti TE)

=== Melita ===
In: Note: Flags indicate national team as defined under FIFA eligibility rules; some limited exceptions apply. Players may hold more than one non-FIFA nationality.

No.	Pos.	Nation	Player

Out: Note: Flags indicate national team as defined under FIFA eligibility rules; some limited exceptions apply. Players may hold more than one non-FIFA nationality.

No.	Pos.	Nation	Player

=== Mosta ===
In: Note: Flags indicate national team as defined under FIFA eligibility rules; some limited exceptions apply. Players may hold more than one non-FIFA nationality.

No.	Pos.	Nation	Player
1	GK	MLT	Justin Haber (from (Greece) Kerkyra)
6	DF	Gozo	Ferdinando Apap (from (England) Sheffield)
11	DF	MLT	Steve Bezzina (from Msida Saint-Joseph)
—	DF	MLT	Luke Dimech (from (Cyprus) AEK Larnaca)
—	MF	MLT	Manolito Micallef (from Floriana)
10	FW	MLT	Daniel Bogdanović (from (England) Blackpool)
—	FW	BUL	Danail Mitev (from Sliema Wanderers)

Out: Note: Flags indicate national team as defined under FIFA eligibility rules; some limited exceptions apply. Players may hold more than one non-FIFA nationality.

No.	Pos.	Nation	Player
22	MF	MLT	Sheldon Grech (to Vittoriosa Stars)

=== Qormi ===
In: Note: Flags indicate national team as defined under FIFA eligibility rules; some limited exceptions apply. Players may hold more than one non-FIFA nationality.

No.	Pos.	Nation	Player
—	MF	MLT	Leighton Grech (on loan from Birkirkara)

Out: Note: Flags indicate national team as defined under FIFA eligibility rules; some limited exceptions apply. Players may hold more than one non-FIFA nationality.

No.	Pos.	Nation	Player
11	MF	MLT	Joseph Farrugia (to St. Andrews)
23	FW	BRA	Jorginho (to (Hungary) Kecskeméti TE)

=== Rabat Ajax ===
In: Note: Flags indicate national team as defined under FIFA eligibility rules; some limited exceptions apply. Players may hold more than one non-FIFA nationality.

No.	Pos.	Nation	Player
29	DF	MLT	Clive Brincat (from Marsaxlokk)

Out: Note: Flags indicate national team as defined under FIFA eligibility rules; some limited exceptions apply. Players may hold more than one non-FIFA nationality.

No.	Pos.	Nation	Player

=== Sliema Wanderers ===
In: Note: Flags indicate national team as defined under FIFA eligibility rules; some limited exceptions apply. Players may hold more than one non-FIFA nationality.

No.	Pos.	Nation	Player
—	FW	MLT	Ivan Woods (from Floriana)

Out: Note: Flags indicate national team as defined under FIFA eligibility rules; some limited exceptions apply. Players may hold more than one non-FIFA nationality.

No.	Pos.	Nation	Player
—	MF	MLT	Trevor Cilia (to Floriana)
10	FW	BUL	Danail Mitev (to Mosta)

=== Tarxien Rainbows ===
In: Note: Flags indicate national team as defined under FIFA eligibility rules; some limited exceptions apply. Players may hold more than one non-FIFA nationality.

No.	Pos.	Nation	Player

Out: Note: Flags indicate national team as defined under FIFA eligibility rules; some limited exceptions apply. Players may hold more than one non-FIFA nationality.

No.	Pos.	Nation	Player
26	MF	MLT	Stefan Giglio (to Balzan)

=== Valletta ===
In: Note: Flags indicate national team as defined under FIFA eligibility rules; some limited exceptions apply. Players may hold more than one non-FIFA nationality.

No.	Pos.	Nation	Player
24	GK	MLT	Manuel Bartolo (from Msida Saint-Joseph)
13	MF	BRA	Riccardo Rocha
21	MF	MLT	Shaun Bajada (from Birkirkara)
5	MF	BRA	Joao Gabriel
17	FW	BRA	Leandro Almeida

Out: Note: Flags indicate national team as defined under FIFA eligibility rules; some limited exceptions apply. Players may hold more than one non-FIFA nationality.

No.	Pos.	Nation	Player
24	GK	MLT	Andrew Hogg (to (Cyprus) Enosis Neon Paralimni)
29	GK	ENG	Matthew Towns (to St. Andrews)
—	DF	MLT	Steve Bezzina (to Mosta)
5	DF	BRA	Ramón (to Vittoriosa Stars)
—	MF	MLT	Massimo Grima (on loan to Ħamrun Spartans)
21	FW	NGA	Alfred Effiong (to Gżira United)
26	FW	SVN	Miha Robic (released)
99	FW	MLT	Terence Scerri (on loan to Ħamrun Spartans)

== Maltese First Division ==
=== Birzebbuga St.Peters ===
In: Note: Flags indicate national team as defined under FIFA eligibility rules; some limited exceptions apply. Players may hold more than one non-FIFA nationality.

No.	Pos.	Nation	Player

Out: Note: Flags indicate national team as defined under FIFA eligibility rules; some limited exceptions apply. Players may hold more than one non-FIFA nationality.

No.	Pos.	Nation	Player

=== Dingli Swallows ===
In: Note: Flags indicate national team as defined under FIFA eligibility rules; some limited exceptions apply. Players may hold more than one non-FIFA nationality.

No.	Pos.	Nation	Player

Out: Note: Flags indicate national team as defined under FIFA eligibility rules; some limited exceptions apply. Players may hold more than one non-FIFA nationality.

No.	Pos.	Nation	Player

=== Gudja United ===
In: Note: Flags indicate national team as defined under FIFA eligibility rules; some limited exceptions apply. Players may hold more than one non-FIFA nationality.

No.	Pos.	Nation	Player

Out: Note: Flags indicate national team as defined under FIFA eligibility rules; some limited exceptions apply. Players may hold more than one non-FIFA nationality.

No.	Pos.	Nation	Player

=== Gżira United ===
In: Note: Flags indicate national team as defined under FIFA eligibility rules; some limited exceptions apply. Players may hold more than one non-FIFA nationality.

No.	Pos.	Nation	Player
—	FW	NGA	Alfred Effiong (from Valletta)
—	FW	MLT	Steven Meilaq (from Ħamrun Spartans)

Out: Note: Flags indicate national team as defined under FIFA eligibility rules; some limited exceptions apply. Players may hold more than one non-FIFA nationality.

No.	Pos.	Nation	Player

=== Lija Athletic ===
In: Note: Flags indicate national team as defined under FIFA eligibility rules; some limited exceptions apply. Players may hold more than one non-FIFA nationality.

No.	Pos.	Nation	Player

Out: Note: Flags indicate national team as defined under FIFA eligibility rules; some limited exceptions apply. Players may hold more than one non-FIFA nationality.

No.	Pos.	Nation	Player

=== Marsaxlokk ===
In: Note: Flags indicate national team as defined under FIFA eligibility rules; some limited exceptions apply. Players may hold more than one non-FIFA nationality.

No.	Pos.	Nation	Player
—	MF	MLT	Rupert Mangion (from Ħamrun Spartans)
—	DF	ENG	Matthew Paul Clarke (from Msida st.Joseph)
—	MF	SWE	Andre Grabowski (from Floriana)
—	DF	MLT	Kenneth Scicluna (from Valletta)
—	GK	MLT	Omar Borg (from Birkirkara)
—	FW	MLT	Warren Chircop (from Tarxien)
—	DF	MLT	Ryan Mifsud (from Birkirkara)
—	DF	MLT	Mark Brincat (from Mosta)

Out: Note: Flags indicate national team as defined under FIFA eligibility rules; some limited exceptions apply. Players may hold more than one non-FIFA nationality.

No.	Pos.	Nation	Player
1	GK	MLT	Reuben Gauci (to Birkirkara)
24	DF	MLT	Patrick Borg (to Birkirkara)
16	DF	MLT	Clive Brincat (to Rabat Ajax)
20	MF	MLT	Trevor Templeman (released)

=== Mqabba ===
In: Note: Flags indicate national team as defined under FIFA eligibility rules; some limited exceptions apply. Players may hold more than one non-FIFA nationality.

No.	Pos.	Nation	Player

Out: Note: Flags indicate national team as defined under FIFA eligibility rules; some limited exceptions apply. Players may hold more than one non-FIFA nationality.

No.	Pos.	Nation	Player

=== Naxxar Lions ===
In: Note: Flags indicate national team as defined under FIFA eligibility rules; some limited exceptions apply. Players may hold more than one non-FIFA nationality.

No.	Pos.	Nation	Player

Out: Note: Flags indicate national team as defined under FIFA eligibility rules; some limited exceptions apply. Players may hold more than one non-FIFA nationality.

No.	Pos.	Nation	Player

=== Pietà Hotspurs ===
In: Note: Flags indicate national team as defined under FIFA eligibility rules; some limited exceptions apply. Players may hold more than one non-FIFA nationality.

No.	Pos.	Nation	Player

Out: Note: Flags indicate national team as defined under FIFA eligibility rules; some limited exceptions apply. Players may hold more than one non-FIFA nationality.

No.	Pos.	Nation	Player

=== St. Andrews ===
In: Note: Flags indicate national team as defined under FIFA eligibility rules; some limited exceptions apply. Players may hold more than one non-FIFA nationality.

No.	Pos.	Nation	Player
—	GK	ENG	Matthew Towns (from Valletta)
—	MF	MLT	Joseph Farrugia (from Qormi)

Out: Note: Flags indicate national team as defined under FIFA eligibility rules; some limited exceptions apply. Players may hold more than one non-FIFA nationality.

No.	Pos.	Nation	Player

=== Vittoriosa Stars ===
In: Note: Flags indicate national team as defined under FIFA eligibility rules; some limited exceptions apply. Players may hold more than one non-FIFA nationality.

No.	Pos.	Nation	Player
—	DF	BRA	Ramón (from Valletta)
—	MF	MLT	Sheldon Grech (from Mosta)
—	FW	MLT	Lydon Micallef (on loan to Vittoriosa Stars)

Out: Note: Flags indicate national team as defined under FIFA eligibility rules; some limited exceptions apply. Players may hold more than one non-FIFA nationality.

No.	Pos.	Nation	Player

=== Zejtun Corinthians ===
In: Note: Flags indicate national team as defined under FIFA eligibility rules; some limited exceptions apply. Players may hold more than one non-FIFA nationality.

No.	Pos.	Nation	Player

Out: Note: Flags indicate national team as defined under FIFA eligibility rules; some limited exceptions apply. Players may hold more than one non-FIFA nationality.

No.	Pos.	Nation	Player

== Manager Transfers ==
Name	Moving from	Moving to	Source

== See also ==
- (Bulgaria) List of Bulgarian football transfers summer 2012
- (Netherlands) List of Dutch football transfers summer 2012
- (England) List of English football transfers summer 2012
- (France) List of French football transfers summer 2012
- (Germany) List of German football transfers summer 2012
- (Italy) List of Italian football transfers summer 2012
- (Portugal) List of Portuguese football transfers summer 2012
- (Spain) List of Spanish football transfers summer 2012
- (Sweden) List of Swedish football transfers summer 2012
