= List of Italian football transfers summer 2012 =

For Italian football transfers summer 2012 see the following articles:

- List of Italian football transfers summer 2012 (co-ownership)
- List of Italian football transfers summer 2012 (July)
- List of Italian football transfers summer 2012 (August)
