= Veselin Tsvetkovski =

Bulgarian footballer

Personal information
- Full name: Veselin Lyubenov Tsvetkovski
- Date of birth: 8 March 1989 (age 37)
- Place of birth: Bulgaria
- Height: 1.80 m (5 ft 11 in)
- Position: Goalkeeper

Team information
- Current team: Lokomotiv Mezdra

Senior career*
Years	Team	Apps	(Gls)
2009–2012	Botev Vratsa	66	(0)
2012–2013	Montana	12	(0)
2013–2014	Botev Vratsa	20	(0)
2014–2015	Marek Dupnitsa	1	(0)
2015	Botev Vratsa	9	(0)
2016	AER Afantou		(0)
2017–	Lokomotiv Mezdra	0	(0)
- * Club domestic league appearances and goals as of 1 February 2016

Veselin Ljubenov Tsvetkovski (Bulgarian: Веселин Любенов Цветковски; born 8 March 1989) is a Bulgarian footballer who plays as a goalkeeper for Lokomotiv Mezdra.

== Career ==
He made his competitive first-team debut on 8 October 2009 in a 3–1 win at away to Lokomotiv Septemvri in a match of the Bulgarian Cup. During 2010–11 season, Tsvetkovski earned 22 appearances in the Bulgarian B PFG.

== Career statistics ==
As of 1 August 2014

Club	Season	League		Cup		Europe		Total	
Club	Season	Apps	Goals	Apps	Goals	Apps	Goals	Apps	Goals
Botev Vratsa	2009–10	21	0	3	0	–	–	24	0
Botev Vratsa	2010–11	22	0	2	0	–	–	24	0
Botev Vratsa	2011–12	23	0	0	0	–	–	23	0
Montana	2012–13	12	0	1	0	–	–	13	0
Botev Vratsa	2013–14	20	0	0	0	–	–	20	0
Marek Dupnitsa	2014–15	0	0	0	0	–	–	0	0
Career totals		98	0	6	0	0	0	104	0
