= Nikolay Vladinov =

Bulgarian footballer

Personal information
- Full name: Nikolay Petrov Vladinov
- Date of birth: 1 April 1987 (age 39)
- Place of birth: Vratsa, Bulgaria
- Height: 1.82 m (5 ft 11 1/2 in)
- Positions: Forward; attacking midfielder

Youth career
- Botev Vratsa

Senior career*
Years	Team	Apps	(Gls)
2005–2008	Lokomotiv Mezdra	12	(1)
2008–2010	Botev Krivodol	51	(12)
2010–2011	Vidima-Rakovski	19	(2)
2011	Le Mont	10	(1)
2012	Botev Vratsa	10	(4)
2012	Minyor Pernik	6	(0)
- * Club domestic league appearances and goals as of 13 January 2013

Nikolay Vladinov (Bulgarian: Николай Владинов; born 1 April 1987 in Vratsa) is a Bulgarian former footballer who played as a forward and attacking midfielder.
