= Georgios Salamastrakis =

Greek footballer

Personal information
- Full name: Georgios Michail Salamastrakis
- Date of birth: December 21, 1981 (age 44)
- Place of birth: Rhodes, Greece
- Height: 1.83 m (6 ft 0 in)
- Position: Centre back

Team information
- Current team: Panachaiki

Senior career*
Years	Team	Apps	(Gls)
2003–2005	Rodos	42	(0)
2005–2011	Diagoras	138	(11)
2011–2012	Panserraikos	31	(2)
2012	Lokomotiv Plovdiv	1	(0)
2012–	Panachaiki	14	(1)
- * Club domestic league appearances and goals as of 6 August 2012

Georgios Salamastrakis (Greek: Γεώργιος Σαλαμαστράκης; born 21 December 1981) is a Greek footballer. He currently plays for Panachaiki F.C. as a centre back.

== Career ==
Born in Rhodes, Salamastrakis began his career with local club Rodos.

In 2005, he joined Diagoras. Georgios made his debut on 25 September 2005, in a 1–0 away win over Apollon Smyrnis. On 10 September 2006, he scored his first Diagoras goal as he netted the first in a 3–1 away win over Agios Dimitrios on the opening day of the 2006–07 season. Salamastrakis scored 11 goals in 138 league matches for Diagoras, before moved to Panserraikos in 2011.

On 27 June 2012, Salamastrakis joined Bulgarian side Lokomotiv Plovdiv. He earned 3 competitive appearances. In early August his contract was terminated by mutual consent.
