= Atanas Chipilov =

Bulgarian footballer

Personal information
- Full name: Atanas Vasilev Chipilov
- Date of birth: 2 June 1987 (age 39)
- Place of birth: Sandanski, Bulgaria
- Height: 1.76 m (5 ft 9 in)
- Position: Winger

Team information
- Current team: Vihren Sandanski
- Number: 11

Youth career
- 2000–2003: Levski Sofia
- 2004–2006: Dynamo Kyiv

Senior career*
Years	Team	Apps	(Gls)
2004–2009	Dynamo Kyiv	0	(0)
2004–2009	→ Dynamo-2 Kyiv	53	(7)
2007	→ Botev Plovdiv (loan)	5	(0)
2008	→ Chernomorets Burgas (loan)	8	(0)
2009–2011	Montana	55	(9)
2011–2012	Beroe Stara Zagora	17	(1)
2012	Slavia Sofia	0	(0)
2012–2013	Montana	15	(0)
2013–2014	Bansko	25	(13)
2014	Haskovo	16	(0)
2015	Pirin Blagoevgrad	2	(0)
2015–2016	Bansko	24	(6)
2016	Neftochimic Burgas	6	(0)
2017	Bansko	12	(3)
2017–2018	Arda Kardzhali	27	(14)
2018–	Vihren Sandanski	50	(5)
- * Club domestic league appearances and goals as of 1 August 2020

Atanas Vasilev Chipilov (Bulgarian: Атанас Чипилов; born 2 June 1987) is a Bulgarian footballer who plays as a winger for Vihren Sandanski.

== Career ==
=== Youth career ===
Chipilov started training his abilities at Levski Sofia's Youth Academy. He joined Dynamo Kyiv's youth side in 2004.

=== Dynamo Kyiv ===
Chipilov joined Dynamo's second team in 2004 and played in the Ukrainian First League for a few seasons. He was loaned to Bulgarian sides Botev Plovdiv and Chernomorets Burgas during 2007 and 2008. In 2009, Chipilov returned Dynamo Kyiv, where he played for the second team of Dynamo Kyiv. He capped 12 times and scored 4 goals.

On 19 June 2009 Chipilov began a trial-period at his former club Levski Sofia. Anyway, his abilities didn't impress the coaching staff, and eventually he didn't join the team.

=== Bansko ===
In January 2017, Chipilov joined Bansko for the third time.

=== Arda Kardzhali ===
On 1 July 2017 he signed with Arda Kardzhali.
