= Boris Deugoué =

French footballer (born 1985)

Personal information
- Full name: Boris Deugoué N'Gagoué
- Date of birth: 2 November 1985 (age 40)
- Place of birth: Yaoundé, Cameroon
- Height: 1.85 m (6 ft 1 in)
- Positions: Defender; defensive midfielder

Youth career
- 1995–2003: Paris F.C.
- 2003–2006: FC Gueugnon

Senior career*
Years	Team	Apps	(Gls)
2007–2008	Olympiakos Nicosia	14	(1)
2008–2009	Navalcarnero	9	(0)
2009–2010	Servette	18	(2)
2012	Montana	2	(0)
- * Club domestic league appearances and goals as of May 26, 2012

Boris Deugoué N'Gagoué (born 2 November 1985) is a French football defender.

== Career ==
Deugoué began his career at the age of 10 at Paris F.C., before moving to FC Gueugnon. He has subsequently worn the colors of Olympiakos Nicosia in the Cypriot First Division and then in 2008 he signed for CDA Navalcarnero in the Spanish Tercera División Group 7. He is a central defender who may also evolve into a defensive midfielder. In the summer of 2009, he signed for a period of 2 years with Servette F.C. He left the club before the 2010–11 season.
