= Giuseppe Pira =

Italian footballer

Personal information
- Date of birth: 13 July 1992 (age 34)
- Place of birth: Licata, Italy
- Height: 1.77 m (5 ft 10 in)
- Position: Right back

Team information
- Current team: ASD Canicatti

Youth career
- 2002–2005: Calcio Alicata
- 2005–2006: Santa Sofia Licata
- 2006–2008: Licata 1931
- 2008–2010: SPAL 1907

Senior career*
Years	Team	Apps	(Gls)
2010–2011	Licata 1931	33	(0)
2011–2012	ASD Sancataldese	0	(0)
2012	→ Licata 1931 (loan)	11	(0)
2012	Botev Vratsa	3	(0)
2013	ASD Canicatti		
2013–2015	Gela		
2015–2019	Licata 1931		
2019	Ragusa		
2019–	ASD Canicatti		
- * Club domestic league appearances and goals as of 28 August 2012

Giuseppe Pira (born 13 July 1992) is an Italian footballer who plays for ASD Canicatti in the Eccellenza.
