= List of English football transfers summer 2012 =

This is a list of English football transfers for the 2012 summer transfer window. Only moves featuring at least one Premier League or Championship club are listed.

The summer transfer window began once clubs had concluded their final domestic fixture of the 2011–12 season, but many transfers only officially went through on 1 July because the majority of player contracts finished on 30 June. The window remained open until 23:00 BST on 31 August 2012.

This list also includes transfers featuring at least one Premier League or Championship club which were completed after the end of the winter 2011–12 transfer window and before the end of the 2012 summer window.

Players without a club could join at any time, and clubs below Premier League level could sign players on loan during loan windows. Clubs could be permitted to sign a goalkeeper on an emergency loan if they had no registered goalkeeper available.

== Transfers ==
All players and clubs without a flag are English. Although Cardiff City and Swansea City are associated with the Welsh flag, they play in the Championship and the Premier League (of England) respectively, and so transfers related to them and another non-English club are included.

Transfers involving Major League Soccer clubs in the United States and Canada technically have the league as the second party and not the listed club. MLS player contracts are owned by the league and not by individual clubs.

Date	Name	Moving from	Moving to	Fee
1 February 2012	(Portugal) Joao Carlos Teixeira	(Portugal) Sporting CP	Liverpool	Undisclosed
2 February 2012	(New Zealand) Ryan Nelsen	Blackburn Rovers	Tottenham Hotspur	Free
8 February 2012	Matthew Briggs	Fulham	Peterborough United	Loan
8 February 2012	Angus MacDonald	Reading	Torquay United	Loan
8 February 2012	(Colombia) Cristian Montaño	West Ham United	Notts County	Loan
8 February 2012	Brett Williams	Reading	Rotherham United	Loan
9 February 2012	Saido Berahino	West Bromwich Albion	Brentford	Loan
9 February 2012	Lawson D'Ath	Reading	Yeovil Town	Loan
9 February 2012	Ryan Dickson	Southampton	Leyton Orient	Loan
9 February 2012	(Cameroon) George Elokobi	Wolverhampton Wanderers	Nottingham Forest	Loan
9 February 2012	Ben Gibson	Middlesbrough	York City	Loan
9 February 2012	Tom Parkes	Leicester City	Bristol Rovers	Loan
9 February 2012	Adam Thompson	Watford	Northampton Town	Loan
9 February 2012	(Slovenia) Haris Vučkić	Newcastle United	(Wales) Cardiff City	Loan
10 February 2012	(Democratic Republic of the Congo) Britt Assombalonga	Watford	Braintree Town	Loan
13 February 2012	(Senegal) Habib Beye	Unattached	Doncaster Rovers	Free
12 February 2012	(Portugal) Francisco Júnior	Manchester City	Everton	Free
14 February 2012	Lee Holmes	Southampton	Oxford United	Loan
14 February 2012	(Scotland) Stephen McManus	Middlesbrough	Bristol City	Loan
14 February 2012	(Portugal) Toni Silva	Liverpool	Northampton Town	Loan
14 February 2012	(Brazil) Bruno Uvini	(Brazil) São Paulo	Tottenham Hotspur	Loan
16 February 2012	(Wales) David Cotterill	Unattached	Barnsley	Free
16 February 2012	(Scotland) Barry Robson	Middlesbrough	(Canada) Vancouver Whitecaps	Free*
16 February 2012	(Republic of Ireland) Rene Gilmartin	Watford	Crawley Town	Loan
17 February 2012	(Israel) Gai Assulin	Manchester City	Brighton & Hove Albion	Loan
17 February 2012	(Republic of Ireland) Jamie Devitt	Hull City	Accrington Stanley	Loan
17 February 2012	(Ivory Coast) Abdul Razak	Manchester City	Brighton & Hove Albion	Loan
17 February 2012	Olly Lee	West Ham United	Gillingham	Loan
17 February 2012	Freddie Sears	West Ham United	Colchester United	Loan
20 February 2012	(Australia) Jake Adelson	Blacktown City	Everton	Free
20 February 2012	Lateef Elford-Alliyu	West Bromwich Albion	Bury	Loan
21 February 2012	Miles Addison	Derby County	Bournemouth	Loan
21 February 2012	Michail Antonio	Reading	Sheffield Wednesday	Loan
21 February 2012	Shaun Batt	Millwall	Crawley Town	Loan
21 February 2012	Tyrone Barnett	Crawley Town	Peterborough United	Loan
21 February 2012	Jack Butland	Birmingham City	Cheltenham Town	Loan
21 February 2012	Craig Eastmond	Arsenal	Wycombe Wanderers	Loan
21 February 2012	Chris Hackett	Millwall	Wycombe Wanderers	Loan
21 February 2012	(Poland) Tomasz Kuszczak	Manchester United	Watford	Loan
22 February 2012	(Australia) Petros Skapetis	(Australia) South Melbourne	Queens Park Rangers	Free
22 February 2012	Jonathan Franks	Middlesbrough	Yeovil Town	Loan
22 February 2012	Jonathan Grounds	Middlesbrough	Yeovil Town	Loan
23 February 2012	(Scotland) Scott Allan	West Bromwich Albion	Portsmouth	Loan
23 February 2012	Jonathan Bond	Watford	Dagenham & Redbridge	Loan
23 February 2012	(Norway) Erik Huseklepp	Portsmouth	Birmingham City	Loan
23 February 2012	Ben Reeves	Southampton	Dagenham & Redbridge	Loan
23 February 2012	(Italy) Marcello Trotta	Fulham	Watford	Loan
24 February 2012	(Russia) Andrei Arshavin	Arsenal	(Russia) Zenit	Loan
24 February 2012	(Northern Ireland) Trevor Carson	Sunderland	Bury	Loan
24 February 2012	(Republic of Ireland) Mark Connolly	Bolton Wanderers	Macclesfield Town	Loan
24 February 2012	Sean Davis	Bolton Wanderers	Bristol City	Loan
24 February 2012	(Republic of Ireland) Michael Liddle	Sunderland	Accrington Stanley	Loan
24 February 2012	(France) Mathieu Manset	Reading	(China) Shanghai Greenland	Loan
24 February 2012	Lee Nicholls	Wigan Athletic	Accrington Stanley	Loan
24 February 2012	(Republic of the Congo) Christopher Samba	Blackburn Rovers	(Russia) Anzhi Makhachkala	£12m
24 February 2012	(Czech Republic) Marek Štěch	West Ham United	Leyton Orient	Loan
24 February 2012	Andros Townsend	Tottenham Hotspur	Birmingham City	Loan
27 February 2012	(Mali) Mahamadou Diarra	Unattached	Fulham	Free
27 February 2012	(Republic of Ireland) Sean McGinty	Manchester United	Morecambe	Loan
28 February 2012	Danny Webber	Unattached	Leeds United	Free
29 February 2012	(Republic of Ireland) Caleb Folan	Unattached	Birmingham City	Free
29 February 2012	Corey Gregory	Sheffield United	Leicester City	Loan
29 February 2012	(Republic of Ireland) Cian Hughton	Unattached	Birmingham City	Free
29 February 2012	Peter Ramage	Queens Park Rangers	Birmingham City	Loan
1 March 2012	Calvin Andrew	Crystal Palace	Leyton Orient	Loan
1 March 2012	Adam Hammill	Wolverhampton Wanderers	Middlesbrough	Loan
1 March 2012	Lee Hills	Crystal Palace	Southend United	Loan
1 March 2012	(Nigeria) Carl Ikeme	Wolverhampton Wanderers	Doncaster Rovers	Loan
2 March 2012	Jordan Obita	Reading	Gillingham	Loan
2 March 2012	Jordan Slew	Blackburn Rovers	Stevenage	Loan
2 March 2012	(Sweden) Samuel Adjei	Newcastle United	Hartlepool United	Loan
3 March 2012	Reece Brown	Manchester United	Oldham Athletic	Loan
3 March 2012	(Republic of Ireland) Liam Lawrence	Portsmouth	(Wales) Cardiff City	Loan
5 March 2012	(Wales) Michael Doughty	Queens Park Rangers	Aldershot Town	Loan
6 March 2012	Paul Rachubka	Leeds United	Leyton Orient	Loan
6 March 2012	Paul Robinson	Bolton Wanderers	Leeds United	Loan
6 March 2012	(France) Frédéric Piquionne	West Ham United	Doncaster Rovers	Loan
6 March 2012	Matt Hill	Blackpool	Sheffield United	Loan
6 March 2012	(Republic of Ireland) John Egan	Sunderland	Sheffield United	Loan
6 March 2012	Sam Mantom	West Bromwich Albion	Walsall	Loan
8 March 2012	(Ghana) Patrick Agyemang	Queens Park Rangers	Stevenage	Loan
8 March 2012	(Jamaica) Jamal Campbell-Ryce	Bristol City	Leyton Orient	Loan
8 March 2012	Frank Nouble	West Ham United	Barnsley	Loan
8 March 2012	Adam Reed	Sunderland	Leyton Orient	Loan
9 March 2012	(Democratic Republic of the Congo) Hérita Ilunga	Unattached	Doncaster	Free
9 March 2012	Jamaal Lascelles	Nottingham Forest	Stevenage	Loan
10 March 2012	(Scotland) Chris Maguire	Derby County	Portsmouth	Loan
12 March 2012	(Australia) Brett Holman	(Netherlands) AZ	Aston Villa	Free*
12 March 2012	(Northern Ireland) Maik Taylor	Leeds United	Millwall	Loan
14 March 2012	Lee Holmes	Southampton	Swindon Town	Loan
14 March 2012	Tope Obadeyi	Bolton Wanderers	Rochdale	Loan
14 March 2012	Lloyd Sam	Leeds United	Notts County	Loan
15 March 2012	(Northern Ireland) Matt Ball	Norwich City	Macclesfield Town	Loan
15 March 2012	Lee Collins	Port Vale	Barnsley	Loan
15 March 2012	Sam Hoskins	Southampton	Rotherham United	Loan
15 March 2012	Hayden Mullins	Portsmouth	Reading	Loan
16 March 2012	(Uruguay) Diego Arismendi	Stoke City	Huddersfield Town	Loan
16 March 2012	Harry Bunn	Manchester City	Oldham Athletic	Loan
16 March 2012	(Wales) Jake Cassidy	Wolverhampton Wanderers	Tranmere Rovers	Loan
16 March 2012	Chris Dagnall	Barnsley	Bradford City	Loan
16 March 2012	(Germany) Max Ehmer	Queens Park Rangers	Preston North End	Loan
16 March 2012	Robert Hall	West Ham United	Milton Keynes Dons	Loan
16 March 2012	(Republic of Ireland) Stephen Henderson	Portsmouth	West Ham United	Loan
16 March 2012	(Republic of Ireland) Rob Kiernan	Wigan Athletic	Accrington Stanley	Loan
16 March 2012	Gavin Massey	Watford	Colchester United	Loan
16 March 2012	(Colombia) Cristian Montaño	West Ham United	Oxford United	Loan
16 March 2012	(Belgium) Franck Moussa	Leicester City	Chesterfield	Loan
17 March 2012	(Scotland) Gregg Wylde	Unattached	Bolton Wanderers	Free
19 March 2012	Lee Cook	Queens Park Rangers	Charlton Athletic	Loan
19 March 2012	(France) Dany N'Guessan	Millwall	Charlton Athletic	Loan
19 March 2012	(Finland) Lauri Dalla Valle	Fulham	Exeter City	Loan
20 March 2012	(Nigeria) Dele Adebola	Hull City	Notts County	Loan
20 March 2012	David Button	Tottenham Hotspur	Barnsley	Loan
20 March 2012	Ryan Noble	Sunderland	Hartlepool United	Loan
22 March 2012	Benik Afobe	Arsenal	Reading	Loan
22 March 2012	Zac Aley	Blackburn Rovers	Macclesfield Town	Loan
22 March 2012	(Cameroon) André Amougou	Burnley	Bristol City	Loan
22 March 2012	Chuks Aneke	Arsenal	Preston North End	Loan
22 March 2012	James Baxendale	Doncaster Rovers	Hereford United	Loan
22 March 2012	(Malta) Daniel Bogdanović	Blackpool	Notts County	Loan
22 March 2012	(Wales) Jonathan Bond	Watford	Bury	Loan
22 March 2012	John Bostock	Tottenham Hotspur	Swindon Town	Loan
22 March 2012	James Chambers	Doncaster Rovers	Hereford United	Loan
22 March 2012	Jordan Cook	Sunderland	Carlisle United	Loan
22 March 2012	(Scotland) Stephen Dobbie	(Wales) Swansea City	Blackpool	Loan
22 March 2012	(Wales) Freddy Eastwood	Coventry City	Southend United	Loan
22 March 2012	Hogan Ephraim	Queens Park Rangers	Bristol City	Loan
22 March 2012	Louis Harris	Wolverhampton Wanderers	Notts County	Loan
22 March 2012	Kallum Higginbotham	Huddersfield Town	Barnsley	Loan
22 March 2012	Zavon Hines	Burnley	Bournemouth	Loan
22 March 2012	(Israel) Dekel Keinan	(Wales) Cardiff City	Bristol City	Loan
22 March 2012	(Scotland) Jay McEveley	Barnsley	Swindon Town	Loan
22 March 2012	Josh Morris	Blackburn Rovers	Yeovil Town	Loan
22 March 2012	Nile Ranger	Newcastle United	Sheffield Wednesday	Loan
22 March 2012	(Netherlands) Karim Rekik	Manchester City	Portsmouth	Loan
22 March 2012	(Italy) Luca Scapuzzi	Manchester City	Portsmouth	Loan
22 March 2012	(Republic of Ireland) Keith Treacy	Burnley	Sheffield Wednesday	Loan
22 March 2012	Rowan Vine	Queens Park Rangers	Gillingham	Loan
23 March 2012	Conor McAleny	Everton	Scunthorpe United	Loan
23 March 2012	(France) Oumare Tounkara	Sunderland	Oldham Athletic	Loan
23 March 2012	Nico Yennaris	Arsenal	Notts County	Loan
28 April 2012	(Germany) Marko Marin	(Germany) Werder Bremen	Chelsea	£7m*
30 April 2012	(Germany) Lukas Podolski	(Germany) 1. FC Köln	Arsenal	£11m*
2 May 2012	Conor Gough	Charlton Athletic	Bristol Rovers	Free
4 May 2012	(Argentina) Damián Martinez	Arsenal	Oxford United	Loan
4 May 2012	Jason Pearce	Portsmouth	Leeds United	Undisclosed
8 May 2012	Tyrone Barnett	Crawley Town	Peterborough United	£1.2m
8 May 2012	Shaun Brisley	Macclesfield Town	Peterborough United	Undisclosed
9 May 2012	Lee Collins	Port Vale	Barnsley	Undisclosed
11 May 2012	Nathaniel Knight-Percival	(Wales) Wrexham	Peterborough United	Free*
15 May 2012	(Belgium) Ritchie De Laet	Manchester United	Leicester City	Undisclosed
15 May 2012	Matty James	Manchester United	Leicester City	Undisclosed
16 May 2012	Garath McCleary	Nottingham Forest	Reading	Free
17 May 2012	Jonathan Franks	Middlesbrough	Hartlepool United	Free
17 May 2012	James Severn	Derby	Scunthorpe United	Free*
18 May 2012	Jamie Vardy	Fleetwood Town	Leicester City	£1m
21 May 2012	Harlee Dean	Southampton	Brentford	Free
21 May 2012	Adam Forshaw	Everton	Brentford	Free
21 May 2012	(Republic of Ireland) Stephen Henderson	Portsmouth	West Ham United	Undisclosed
22 May 2012	(Northern Ireland) Trevor Carson	Sunderland	Bury	Free*
23 May 2012	(France) Romain Amalfitano	(France) Stade de Reims	Newcastle United	Free*
24 May 2012	David Amoo	Liverpool	Preston North End	Free
24 May 2012	(Brazil) Fábio Aurélio	Liverpool	(Brazil) Grêmio	Free
24 May 2012	Andrew Davies	Stoke City	Bradford City	Free*
24 May 2012	Chris Kirkland	Wigan Athletic	Sheffield Wednesday	Free*
24 May 2012	(Democratic Republic of the Congo) Lomana LuaLua	Blackpool	(Turkey) Kardemir Karabükspor	Free
25 May 2012	Joe Lewis	Peterborough United	(Wales) Cardiff City	Free*
26 May 2012	Richard Wright	Ipswich Town	Preston North End	Free
28 May 2012	Paul Jones	Peterborough United	Crawley Town	Free
28 May 2012	Kieran Lee	Oldham Athletic	Sheffield Wednesday	Free*
29 May 2012	Lee Holmes	Southampton	Preston North End	Free*
29 May 2012	Grant Leadbitter	Ipswich Town	Middlesbrough	Free*
29 May 2012	Jeffrey Monakana	Arsenal	Preston North End	Free*
29 May 2012	Joel Ward	Portsmouth	Crystal Palace	£400k
29 May 2012	Aaron Wildig	(Wales) Cardiff City	Shrewsbury Town	Free*
30 May 2012	Elliott Hewitt	Macclesfield Town	Ipswich Town	Undisclosed
30 May 2012	Scott Malone	Bournemouth	Millwall	£750k P/Ex
30 May 2012	(Northern Ireland) Josh McQuoid	Millwall	Bournemouth	P/Ex
3 June 2012	(Netherlands) Dirk Kuyt	Liverpool	(Turkey) Fenerbahçe	£1m*
4 June 2012	(Belgium) Eden Hazard	(France) Lille	Chelsea	£32m
6 June 2012	(Scotland) Danny Swanson	(Scotland) Dundee United	Peterborough United	Free
7 June 2012	(Croatia) Niko Kranjčar	Tottenham Hotspur	(Ukraine) Dynamo Kyiv	£5.75m
7 June 2012	(Republic of Ireland) Ben Glasgow	Arsenal	Stoke City	Free
7 June 2012	Aaron Martin	Southampton	Crystal Palace	Loan
8 June 2012	(Nigeria) Kelvin Etuhu	Unattached	Barnsley	Free
8 June 2012	Joe Mattock	West Bromwich Albion	Sheffield Wednesday	Free
10 June 2012	Jay Rodriguez	Burnley	Southampton	£7m
11 June 2012	Rhys Bennett	Bolton Wanderers	Rochdale	Free
11 June 2012	Louis Harris	Wolverhampton Wanderers	AFC Wimbledon	Free
12 June 2012	Jody Morris	(Scotland) St Johnstone	Bristol City	Free*
12 June 2012	Nick Powell	Crewe Alexandra	Manchester United	Undisclosed*
13 June 2012	(Finland) Jussi Jääskeläinen	Bolton Wanderers	West Ham United	Free*
13 June 2012	Jon Parkin	(Wales) Cardiff City	Fleetwood Town	Free
14 June 2012	Sam Cowler	West Ham United	Barnet	Undisclosed
14 June 2012	George Williams	Milton Keynes Dons	Fulham	Undisclosed
14 June 2012	Dave Syers	Bradford City	Doncaster Rovers	Free
15 June 2012	(Poland) Bartosz Białkowski	Southampton	Notts County	Free
15 June 2012	Luke O'Neill	Mansfield Town	Burnley	Undisclosed
18 June 2012	(Ivory Coast) Sol Bamba	Leicester City	(Turkey) Trabzonspor	Undisclosed
18 June 2012	Andrew Johnson	Fulham	Queens Park Rangers	Free
18 June 2012	(New Zealand) Ryan Nelsen	Tottenham Hotspur	Queens Park Rangers	Free
18 June 2012	(Austria) Bobby Olejnik	Torquay United	Peterborough United	Undisclosed
18 June 2012	Gary Roberts	Huddersfield Town	Swindon Town	Free
19 June 2012	Adam Drury	Norwich City	Leeds United	Free*
19 June 2012	Jacob Mellis	Chelsea	Barnsley	Free
19 June 2012	(Iceland) Björn Sigurðarson	(Norway) Lillestrøm	Wolverhampton Wanderers	Undisclosed***
20 June 2012	(Senegal) Mohamed Diamé	Wigan Athletic	West Ham United	Free
20 June 2012	(Wales) Ryan Doble	Southampton	Shrewsbury Town	Free
20 June 2012	(Ivory Coast) Didier Drogba	Chelsea	(China) Shanghai Greenland	Free
20 June 2012	(Republic of Ireland) Paul Green	Derby County	Leeds United	Free
20 June 2012	(Poland) Tomasz Kuszczak	Manchester United	Brighton	Free
21 June 2012	Anthony Gardner	Crystal Palace	Sheffield Wednesday	Free*
21 June 2012	Robert Green	West Ham United	Queens Park Rangers	Free*
21 June 2012	(Scotland) Chris Maguire	Derby County	Sheffield Wednesday	Undisclosed
21 June 2012	(Scotland) Jay McEveley	Barnsley	Swindon Town	Free
21 June 2012	(Egypt) Mido	(Egypt) Zamalek	Barnsley	Free
21 June 2012	Tommy Miller	Huddersfield Town	Swindon Town	Free
21 June 2012	Alan Navarro	Brighton & Hove Albion	Swindon Town	Free
22 June 2012	(Japan) Shinji Kagawa	(Germany) Borussia Dortmund	Manchester United	Undisclosed*
22 June 2012	Jordon Mutch	Birmingham City	(Wales) Cardiff City	Undisclosed
22 June 2012	Frank Nouble	West Ham United	Wolverhampton Wanderers	Free
22 June 2012	Jamie Tank	Walsall	Wolverhampton Wanderers	£20k
23 June 2012	(Republic of Ireland) Sean Scannell	Crystal Palace	Huddersfield Town	Undisclosed
25 June 2012	Danny Murphy	Fulham	Blackburn Rovers	Free
25 June 2012	(Spain) Bruno Saltor	(Spain) Valencia	Brighton & Hove Albion	Free
26 June 2012	(France) Olivier Giroud	(France) Montpellier	Arsenal	£12m
26 June 2012	Michael Jacobs	Northampton Town	Derby County	Free*
26 June 2012	James Wallace	Everton	Tranmere Rovers	Undisclosed
27 June 2012	Robbie Blake	Bolton Wanderers	Doncaster Rovers	Free
27 June 2012	Alban Bunjaku	Arsenal	(Spain) Sevilla	Free
27 June 2012	(Croatia) Vedran Ćorluka	Tottenham Hotspur	(Russia) Lokomotiv Moscow	Undisclosed
27 June 2012	(Mali) Samba Diakité	(France) Nancy	Queens Park Rangers	Undisclosed
27 June 2012	(Scotland) Paul Dixon	(Scotland) Dundee United	Huddersfield Town	Free*
27 June 2012	(Spain) Joan Àngel Román	Manchester City	(Spain) Barcelona	Undisclosed
28 June 2012	Jordan Brown	West Ham United	Barnet	Free
28 June 2012	Thomas Cruise	Arsenal	Torquay United	Free
28 June 2012	(Scotland) Jamie McAllister	Bristol City	Yeovil Town	Free
28 June 2012	(Croatia) Mladen Petrić	(Germany) Hamburg SV	Fulham	Free
28 June 2012	Michael Poke	Brighton & Hove Albion	Torquay United	Free
28 June 2012	(Nigeria) Yakubu	Blackburn Rovers	(China) Guangzhou R&F	Undisclosed
29 June 2012	(Republic of Ireland) Keith Andrews	West Bromwich Albion	Bolton Wanderers	Free
29 June 2012	Ben Foster	Birmingham City	West Bromwich Albion	Undisclosed
29 June 2012	Danny Guthrie	Newcastle United	Reading	Free
29 June 2012	(Northern Ireland) Oliver Norwood	Manchester United	Huddersfield Town	Free
30 June 2012	(Russia) Pavel Pogrebnyak	Fulham	Reading	Free
30 June 2012	(Scotland) Steven Whittaker	(Scotland) Rangers	Norwich City	Free
1 July 2012	(Northern Ireland) George McCartney	Sunderland	West Ham United	Undisclosed
2 July 2012	(Republic of Ireland) Leon Best	Newcastle United	Blackburn Rovers	£3m
2 July 2012	(Spain) Carlos Cuellar	Aston Villa	Sunderland	Free
2 July 2012	(Brazil) Fábio da Silva	Manchester United	Queens Park Rangers	Loan
2 July 2012	Ryan Edwards	Blackburn Rovers	Rochdale	Loan
2 July 2012	(Morocco) Karim El Ahmadi	(Netherlands) Feyenoord	Aston Villa	Undisclosed
2 July 2012	Jonathan Grounds	Middlesbrough	Oldham Athletic	Free
2 July 2012	Brett Ormerod	Blackpool	(Wales) Wrexham	Free
2 July 2012	Stuart Parnaby	Unattached	Middlesbrough	Free
2 July 2012	(Republic of Ireland) Joe Rafferty	Liverpool	Rochdale	Free
2 July 2012	Nathan Ralph	Peterborough United	Yeovil Town	Free
3 July 2012	Lee Angol	Tottenham Hotspur	Wycombe Wanderers	Undisclosed
3 July 2012	Will Atkinson	Hull City	Bradford City	Free
3 July 2012	Jacob Butterfield	Barnsley	Norwich City	Tribunal
3 July 2012	(Jamaica) Jamal Campbell-Ryce	Bristol City	Notts County	Free
3 July 2012	(Republic of Ireland) Gary Doherty	Charlton Athletic	Wycombe Wanderers	Undisclosed
3 July 2012	(Portugal) Nuno Gomes	(Portugal) Braga	Blackburn Rovers	Free
3 July 2012	Chris Hackett	Millwall	Northampton Town	Free
3 July 2012	(France) Paul Pogba	Manchester United	(Italy) Juventus	Free
3 July 2012	George Porter	Leyton Orient	Burnley	Undisclosed
3 July 2012	Daniel Waller	Fulham	Arsenal	Free
4 July 2012	Christian Burgess	Unattached	Middlesbrough	Free
4 July 2012	Lee Croft	Derby County	Oldham Athletic	Loan
4 July 2012	Lateef Elford-Alliyu	West Bromwich Albion	Bury	Free
4 July 2012	(Republic of Ireland) Rene Gilmartin	Watford	Plymouth Argyle	Free
4 July 2012	Ashley Hemmings	Wolverhampton Wanderers	Walsall	Free
4 July 2012	Matt Mills	Leicester City	Bolton Wanderers	Undisclosed
4 July 2012	(Scotland) Steven Naismith	(Scotland) Rangers	Everton	Free
4 July 2012	Freddie Sears	West Ham United	Colchester United	Free
4 July 2012	(Iceland) Gylfi Sigurðsson	(Germany) TSG 1899 Hoffenheim	Tottenham Hotspur	£8m
4 July 2012	Oliver Norburn	Leicester City	Bristol Rovers	Free
4 July 2012	Aaron Wilbraham	Norwich City	Crystal Palace	Free
4 July 2012	(Republic of Ireland) Anthony Flood	Southend United	(Republic of Ireland) St. Patrick's Athletic	Free
5 July 2012	Ben Alnwick	Tottenham Hotspur	Barnsley	Free
5 July 2012	(Republic of Ireland) Greg Cunningham	Manchester City	Bristol City	Undisclosed
5 July 2012	Stephen Darby	Liverpool	Bradford City	Free
5 July 2012	Fraser Forster	Newcastle United	(Scotland) Celtic	£2m
5 July 2012	(Republic of Ireland) Kevin Kilbane	Hull City	Coventry City	Free
5 July 2012	(Portugal) Fábio Nunes	(Portugal) Portimonense	Blackburn Rovers	Undisclosed
5 July 2012	Jon Otsemobor	Sheffield Wednesday	Milton Keynes Dons	Free
5 July 2012	Jason Shackell	Derby County	Burnley	£1.1m
5 July 2012	(Scotland) Joe McKee	Burnley	Bolton Wanderers	Free
5 July 2012	Sean Goss	Exeter City	Manchester United	£100k
6 July 2012	(Democratic Republic of the Congo) Gaël Bigirimana	Coventry City	Newcastle United	£1m
6 July 2012	Wayne Bridge	Manchester City	Brighton & Hove Albion	Loan
6 July 2012	Adam Clayton	Leeds United	Huddersfield Town	Undisclosed
6 July 2012	(Northern Ireland) Steven Davis	(Scotland) Rangers	Southampton	Free
6 July 2012	(Brazil) Denílson	Arsenal	(Brazil) São Paulo	Loan
6 July 2012	Jake Forster-Caskey	Brighton & Hove Albion	Oxford United	Loan
6 July 2012	(Ghana) Asamoah Gyan	Sunderland	(United Arab Emirates) Al Ain	Undisclosed
6 July 2012	Matthew Lowton	Sheffield United	Aston Villa	£3m
6 July 2012	Nathaniel Mendez-Laing	Wolverhampton Wanderers	Peterborough United	Undisclosed
6 July 2012	Charlie Oatway	Unattached	Brighton & Hove Albion	Free
6 July 2012	(Germany) Sascha Riether	(Germany) 1. FC Köln	Fulham	Loan
6 July 2012	(Republic of Ireland) Pierce Sweeney	(Republic of Ireland) Bray Wanderers	Reading	Undisclosed
6 July 2012	Chris Weale	Leicester City	Shrewsbury Town	Free
6 July 2012	Jonathan Woodgate	Stoke City	Middlesbrough	Free
7 July 2012	(Ivory Coast) Salomon Kalou	Chelsea	(France) Lille	Free
7 July 2012	Ben Amos	Manchester United	Hull City	Loan
9 July 2012	Michael Bostwick	Stevenage	Peterborough United	Undisclosed
9 July 2012	Jake Caprice	Crystal Palace	Blackpool	Free
9 July 2012	Luke Chambers	Nottingham Forest	Ipswich Town	Free
9 July 2012	(Republic of Ireland) Mark Connolly	Bolton Wanderers	Crawley Town	Free
9 July 2012	Jordan Cook	Sunderland	Charlton Athletic	Free
9 July 2012	(Switzerland) Eldin Jakupović	(Greece) Aris	Hull City	Free
9 July 2012	(Denmark) Peter Løvenkrands	Newcastle United	Birmingham City	Free
9 July 2012	(South Korea) Park Ji-Sung	Manchester United	Queens Park Rangers	£2m
9 July 2012	(Wales) Christian Ribeiro	Bristol City	Scunthorpe United	Free
9 July 2012	Lawrie Wilson	Stevenage	Charlton Athletic	Undisclosed
10 July 2012	(Portugal) Diogo Amado	(Portugal) Leiria	Sheffield Wednesday	Free
10 July 2012	(Spain) Chico Flores	(Italy) Genoa	(Wales) Swansea City	£2m
10 July 2012	(Netherlands) Jonathan de Guzmán	(Spain) Villarreal	(Wales) Swansea City	Loan
10 July 2012	Gavin Hoyte	Arsenal	Dagenham & Redbridge	Free
10 July 2012	(Argentina) Emmanuel Ledesma	Unattached	Middlesbrough	Free
10 July 2012	David Lucas	Unattached	Birmingham City	Free
10 July 2012	Nicky Shorey	West Bromwich Albion	Reading	Free
10 July 2012	(Portugal) João Silva	Everton	(Bulgaria) Levski Sofia	Undisclosed
10 July 2012	Alan Smith	Newcastle United	Milton Keynes Dons	Free
10 July 2012	(South Africa) Aaron Mokoena	Portsmouth	(South Africa) Bidvest Wits	Free
11 July 2012	(Belgium) Yassine El Ghanassy	(Belgium) Gent	West Bromwich Albion	Loan
11 July 2012	(Republic of Ireland) Paddy Kenny	Queens Park Rangers	Leeds United	Undisclosed
11 July 2012	(Wales) Joel Lynch	Nottingham Forest	Huddersfield Town	Free
12 July 2012	Miles Addison	Derby County	Bournemouth	Free
12 July 2012	(Iraq) Yaser Kasim	Brighton & Hove Albion	Luton Town	Loan
12 July 2012	Hayden Mullins	Portsmouth	Birmingham City	Free
12 July 2012	(Slovenia) Etien Velikonja	(Slovenia) Maribor	(Wales) Cardiff City	Undisclosed
12 July 2012	(Belgium) Jan Vertonghen	(Netherlands) Ajax	Tottenham Hotspur	Undisclosed
12 July 2012	(Colombia) Hugo Rodallega	Wigan Athletic	Fulham	Free
13 July 2012	Darren Ambrose	Crystal Palace	Birmingham City	Undisclosed
13 July 2012	(Italy) Fabio Borini	(Italy) Roma	Liverpool	£10.5m
13 July 2012	(Ghana) John Cofie	Manchester United	Sheffield United	Loan
13 July 2012	Karleigh Osborne	Brentford	Millwall	Free
13 July 2012	(Argentina) Maxi Rodríguez	Liverpool	(Argentina) Newell's Old Boys	Free
14 July 2012	(Scotland) Paul Coutts	Preston North End	Derby County	Undisclosed
16 July 2012	(Belgium) Florent Cuvelier	Stoke City	Walsall	Loan
16 July 2012	(Scotland) Fraser Fyvie	(Scotland) Aberdeen	Wigan Athletic	Undisclosed
16 July 2012	(Scotland) Kenny Miller	(Wales) Cardiff City	(Canada) Vancouver Whitecaps	Free
16 July 2012	(Republic of Ireland) Clinton Morrison	Sheffield Wednesday	Colchester United	Free
16 July 2012	(Slovenia) Nejc Pečnik	(Portugal) Nacional	Sheffield Wednesday	Free
17 July 2012	Ryan Brunt	Stoke City	Leyton Orient	Loan
17 July 2012	(Wales) Chris Gunter	Nottingham Forest	Reading	Undisclosed
17 July 2012	(South Africa) Bongani Khumalo	Tottenham Hotspur	(Greece) PAOK	Loan
17 July 2012	Andrew Lonergan	Leeds United	Bolton Wanderers	Undisclosed
17 July 2012	(Jamaica) Adrian Mariappa	Watford	Reading	Undisclosed
17 July 2012	Liam Palmer	Sheffield Wednesday	Tranmere Rovers	Loan
18 July 2012	Ryan Allsop	Millwall	Leyton Orient	Free
18 July 2012	Nathan Clarke	Huddersfield Town	Leyton Orient	Free
18 July 2012	(Hungary) Márkó Futács	Portsmouth	Leicester City	Free
18 July 2012	Lee Hills	Crystal Palace	Stevenage	Free
18 July 2012	(Republic of Ireland) Michael Liddle	Sunderland	Accrington Stanley	Undisclosed
18 July 2012	(Mali) Modibo Maïga	(France) Sochaux	West Ham United	£4.7m
18 July 2012	Joseph Mills	Reading	Burnley	Loan
19 July 2012	Callum Ball	Derby County	Coventry City	Loan
19 July 2012	Nathaniel Clyne	Crystal Palace	Southampton	Free
19 July 2012	(Republic of Ireland) Richard Keogh	Coventry City	Derby County	Undisclosed
19 July 2012	Scott Loach	Watford	Ipswich Town	Undisclosed
19 July 2012	(Germany) Nick Proschwitz	(Germany) SC Paderborn 07	Hull City	£2.6m
20 July 2012	Reece Brown	Manchester United	Coventry City	Loan
20 July 2012	(Senegal) Abdoulaye Faye	West Ham United	Hull City	
20 July 2012	Tommy Forecast	Southampton	Gillingham	Loan
20 July 2012	(Argentina) Paulo Gazzaniga	Gillingham	Southampton	Undisclosed
20 July 2012	(Spain) Michu	(Spain) Rayo Vallecano	(Wales) Swansea City	£2m
20 July 2012	Isaiah Osbourne	(Scotland) Hibernian	Blackpool	Free
22 July 2012	(Norway) Omar Elabdellaoui	Manchester City	(Netherlands) Feyenoord	Loan
23 July 2012	(Jamaica) Rodolph Austin	(Norway) SK Brann	Leeds United	£300k
23 July 2012	Andy Gray	Barnsley	Leeds United	Free
23 July 2012	David Ball	Peterborough United	Fleetwood Town	Undisclosed
23 July 2012	Jonson Clarke-Harris	Coventry City	Peterborough United	Free
23 July 2012	(Algeria) Adlène Guedioura	Wolverhampton Wanderers	Nottingham Forest	Undisclosed
23 July 2012	(Portugal) Toni Silva	Liverpool	Barnsley	Free
23 July 2012	(Switzerland) Raphael Spiegel	(Switzerland) Grasshopper	West Ham United	Undisclosed
23 July 2012	(Czech Republic) Marcel Gecov	Fulham	(Belgium) Gent	Undisclosed
24 July 2012	Jamie Ashdown	Portsmouth	Leeds United	Free
24 July 2012	Michael Hector	Reading	Shrewsbury Town	Loan
24 July 2012	(Australia) Massimo Luongo	Tottenham Hotspur	Ipswich Town	Loan
24 July 2012	(United States) Zak Whitbread	Unattached	Leicester City	Free
24 July 2012	(Argentina) Claudio Yacob	Unattached	West Brom	Free
24 July 2012	Anthony Edgar	West Ham	Barnet	Free
24 July 2012	(Belgium) Thorgan Hazard	(France) Lens	Chelsea	Undisclosed
25 July 2012	(Nigeria) Sone Aluko	(Scotland) Rangers	Hull City	Free
25 July 2012	(Wales) Danny Collins	Stoke City	Nottingham Forest	Undisclosed
25 July 2012	(Portugal) Tiago Gomes	(Spain) Hércules	Blackpool	Free
25 July 2012	(Brazil) Oscar	(Brazil) Internacional	Chelsea	Undisclosed
25 July 2012	Luke Varney	Portsmouth	Leeds United	Free
26 July 2012	Paul Anderson	Nottingham Forest	Bristol City	Free
26 July 2012	(Australia) Tim Cahill	Everton	(United States) New York Red Bulls	Undisclosed
26 July 2012	Aidan Chippendale	Huddersfield Town	Accrington Stanley	Free
26 July 2012	Matthew Lund	Stoke City	Bristol Rovers	Loan
26 July 2012	(Scotland) Robert Snodgrass	Leeds United	Norwich City	Undisclosed
26 July 2012	Keith Southern	Blackpool	Huddersfield Town	Free
27 July 2012	Ross Atkins	Derby County	Burton Albion	Loan
27 July 2012	Greg Halford	Portsmouth	Nottingham Forest	Undisclosed
27 July 2012	Tom Heaton	(Wales) Cardiff City	Bristol City	Free
27 July 2012	(Canada) Junior Hoilett	Blackburn Rovers	Queens Park Rangers	TBC
27 July 2012	(Portugal) Paulo Jorge	(Portugal) Braga	Blackburn Rovers	Undisclosed
27 July 2012	(Portugal) Edinho Júnior	(Portugal) Olhanense	Blackburn Rovers	Undisclosed
27 July 2012	(South Korea) Kim Bo-Kyung	(Japan) Cerezo Osaka	(Wales) Cardiff City	£2m
27 July 2012	David Norris	Portsmouth	Leeds United	Free
27 July 2012	(Scotland) Scott Robertson	(Scotland) Dundee United	Blackpool	Free
27 July 2012	Michael Turner	Sunderland	Norwich City	Undisclosed
28 July 2012	Dan Harding	Southampton	Nottingham Forest	Undisclosed
29 July 2012	Tom Eckersley	Bolton Wanderers	Accrington Stanley	Free
30 July 2012	(Republic of Ireland) Alex Bruce	Leeds United	Hull City	Free
30 July 2012	(Mali) Tongo Doumbia	(France) Rennes	Wolverhampton Wanderers	Loan
30 July 2012	George Friend	Doncaster Rovers	Middlesbrough	Undisclosed
30 July 2012	Matt Hill	Blackpool	Sheffield United	Free
30 July 2012	Angus MacDonald	Reading	AFC Wimbledon	Loan
30 July 2012	(Scotland) Rhys McCabe	(Scotland) Rangers	Sheffield Wednesday	Free
30 July 2012	Tony McMahon	Middlesbrough	Sheffield United	Free
30 July 2012	Matty Pearson	Blackburn Rovers	Rochdale	Free
31 July 2012	Ben Amos	Manchester United	Hull City	Loan
31 July 2012	(Australia) Curtis Good	(Australia) Melbourne Heart	Newcastle United	Undisclosed
31 July 2012	Rob Jones	Sheffield Wednesday	Doncaster Rovers	Free
31 July 2012	David Mirfin	Watford	Scunthorpe United	Free
31 July 2012	(South Africa) Steven Pienaar	Tottenham Hotspur	Everton	£4.5m
31 July 2012	Rowan Vine	Queens Park Rangers	(Scotland) St Johnstone	Free
31 July 2012	(Wales) Sam Vokes	Wolverhampton Wanderers	Burnley	Undisclosed
1 August 2012	(The Gambia) Mustapha Carayol	Bristol Rovers	Middlesbrough	Undisclosed
1 August 2012	(Wales) James Collins	Aston Villa	West Ham United	£2.5m
1 August 2012	Paul Downing	West Bromwich Albion	Walsall	Free
1 August 2012	(France) Salim Kerkar	(Scotland) Rangers	Charlton Athletic	Free
1 August 2012	Ryan Lowe	Sheffield Wednesday	Milton Keynes Dons	Undisclosed
1 August 2012	(Republic of Ireland) Andy O'Brien	Leeds United	(Canada) Vancouver Whitecaps	Free
1 August 2012	James O'Connor	Doncaster Rovers	Derby County	Undisclosed
1 August 2012	Connor Taylor	Aston Villa	Walsall	Free
1 August 2012	(Netherlands) Ron Vlaar	(Netherlands) Feyenoord	Aston Villa	Undisclosed
2 August 2012	(Wales) Jake Cassidy	Wolverhampton Wanderers	Tranmere Rovers	Loan
2 August 2012	(Wales) Andrew Crofts	Norwich City	Brighton & Hove Albion	Undisclosed
2 August 2012	(Belgium) Kevin De Bruyne	Chelsea	(Germany) Werder Bremen	Loan
2 August 2012	(Iceland) Heiðar Helguson	Queens Park Rangers	(Wales) Cardiff City	Undisclosed
2 August 2012	(Spain) Iván Ramis	(Spain) Mallorca	Wigan Athletic	Undisclosed
2 August 2012	(Slovakia) Vladimír Weiss	Manchester City	(Italy) Pescara	Undisclosed
3 August 2012	Benik Afobe	Arsenal	Bolton Wanderers	Loan
3 August 2012	(Italy) Alberto Aquilani	Liverpool	(Italy) Fiorentina	Undisclosed
3 August 2012	(Nigeria) Dickson Etuhu	Fulham	Blackburn Rovers	Undisclosed
4 August 2012	Nathan Doyle	Barnsley	Bradford City	Free
4 August 2012	Simon Gillett	Doncaster Rovers	Nottingham Forest	Free
4 August 2012	Lee Peltier	Leicester City	Leeds United	Undisclosed
6 August 2012	Michail Antonio	Reading	Sheffield Wednesday	Undisclosed
6 August 2012	(Poland) Tomasz Cywka	Unattached	Barnsley	Free
6 August 2012	Johnny Gorman	Wolverhampton Wanderers	Plymouth Argyle	Loan
6 August 2012	Ravel Morrison	West Ham United	Birmingham City	Loan
6 August 2012	Lee Nicholls	Wigan Athletic	Northampton Town	Loan
6 August 2012	(Republic of Ireland) Karl Sheppard	Reading	Accrington Stanley	Loan
6 August 2012	(Nigeria) Joseph Yobo	Everton	(Turkey) Fenerbahçe	Undisclosed
7 August 2012	(Nigeria) Dele Adebola	Hull City	Rochdale	Free
7 August 2012	(Spain) Daniel Ayala	Norwich City	Nottingham Forest	Loan
7 August 2012	Sonny Bradley	Hull City	Aldershot Town	Loan
7 August 2012	(Spain) Santi Cazorla	(Spain) Málaga	Arsenal	Undisclosed
7 August 2012	Mark Cullen	Hull City	Bury	Loan
7 August 2012	Michael Hoganson	Newcastle United	Derby County	Free
7 August 2012	Peter Ramage	Queens Park Rangers	Crystal Palace	Free
7 August 2012	(Sweden) Markus Rosenberg	Unattached	West Bromwich Albion	Free
8 August 2012	(United States) Geoff Cameron	(United States) Houston Dynamo	Stoke City	Undisclosed
8 August 2012	Anthony Gerrard	(Wales) Cardiff City	Huddersfield Town	Undisclosed
8 August 2012	Michael Kightly	Wolverhampton Wanderers	Stoke City	Undisclosed
8 August 2012	(Democratic Republic of the Congo) Henoc Mukendi	Liverpool	Northampton Town	Loan
8 August 2012	Jordan Slew	Blackburn Rovers	Oldham Athletic	Loan
9 August 2012	(Switzerland) Alexandre Geijo	(Italy) Udinese	Watford	Loan
9 August 2012	(Poland) Sławomir Peszko	(Germany) 1. FC Köln	Wolverhampton Wanderers	Loan
9 August 2012	(Scotland) Paul Quinn	(Wales) Cardiff City	Doncaster Rovers	Free
9 August 2012	(Scotland) Mark Reynolds	Sheffield Wednesday	(Scotland) Aberdeen	Loan
10 August 2012	(Wales) Joe Allen	(Wales) Swansea City	Liverpool	Undisclosed
10 August 2012	(Wales) Craig Bellamy	Liverpool	(Wales) Cardiff City	Free
10 August 2012	Nick Blackman	Blackburn Rovers	Sheffield United	Undisclosed
10 August 2012	Harry Cooksley	Reading	Aldershot Town	Free
10 August 2012	(France) Alou Diarra	(France) Marseille	West Ham United	£2m
10 August 2012	Ryan Fredericks	Tottenham Hotspur	Brentford	Loan
10 August 2012	Ben Gordon	Chelsea	Birmingham City	Loan
10 August 2012	Antony Kay	Huddersfield Town	Milton Keynes Dons	Free
10 August 2012	(Turkey) Colin Kazim-Richards	(Turkey) Galatasaray	Blackburn Rovers	Loan
10 August 2012	(Scotland) Fraser Kerr	Birmingham City	(Scotland) Motherwell	Loan
10 August 2012	(Belgium) Romelu Lukaku	Chelsea	West Bromwich Albion	Loan
10 August 2012	Ryan Watson	Wigan Athletic	Accrington Stanley	Loan
11 August 2012	(Senegal) El Hadji Diouf	Doncaster Rovers	Leeds United	Free
11 August 2012	Tommy Elphick	Brighton & Hove Albion	Bournemouth	Undisclosed
11 August 2012	(Wales) Brian Stock	Doncaster Rovers	Burnley	Undisclosed
12 August 2012	Jack Rodwell	Everton	Manchester City	£12m
13 August 2012	Scott Barron	Millwall	Brentford	Undisclosed
13 August 2012	(Japan) Ryo Miyaichi	Arsenal	Wigan Athletic	Loan
13 August 2012	(Nigeria) Danny Shittu	Queens Park Rangers	Millwall	Free
14 August 2012	(Ivory Coast) Arouna Koné	(Spain) Sevilla	Wigan Athletic	Undisclosed
14 August 2012	Myles Anderson	Blackburn Rovers	Aldershot Town	Loan
14 August 2012	James Caton	Bolton Wanderers	Blackpool	Free
14 August 2012	(Republic of Ireland) Simon Cox	West Bromwich Albion	Nottingham Forest	Undisclosed
14 August 2012	(Denmark) Adda Djeziri	(Denmark) Viborg	Blackpool	Free
14 August 2012	Ben Gibson	Middlesbrough	Tranmere Rovers	Loan
14 August 2012	Marlon Harewood	Nottingham Forest	Barnsley	Free
14 August 2012	(Spain) Alberto Noguera	(Spain) Atlético Madrid	Blackpool	Free
14 August 2012	Sam Walker	Chelsea	Bristol Rovers	Loan
15 August 2012	(Colombia) David González	Brighton & Hove Albion	Barnsley	Free
15 August 2012	Anthony O'Connor	Blackburn Rovers	Burton Albion	Loan
16 August 2012	(Netherlands) Vurnon Anita	(Netherlands) Ajax	Newcastle United	Undisclosed
16 August 2012	Sam Hutchinson	Chelsea	Nottingham Forest	Loan
16 August 2012	(France) Louis Saha	Unattached	Sunderland	Free
16 August 2012	(Scotland) Mark Wilson	(Scotland) Celtic	Bristol City	Free
17 August 2012	Nicky Ajose	Peterborough United	Crawley Town	Loan
17 August 2012	(Morocco) Oussama Assaidi	(Netherlands) Heerenveen	Liverpool	Undisclosed
17 August 2012	(Portugal) José Bosingwa	Chelsea	Queens Park Rangers	Free
17 August 2012	(France) Dorian Dervite	(Spain) Villarreal B	Charlton Athletic	Free
17 August 2012	(France) Nouha Dicko	Wigan Athletic	Blackpool	Loan
17 August 2012	(Barbados) Jonathan Forte	Southampton	Crawley Town	Loan
17 August 2012	James Harper	Hull City	Doncaster Rovers	Free
17 August 2012	Alex Marrow	Crystal Palace	Fleetwood Town	Loan
17 August 2012	Danny Mayor	Preston North End	Sheffield Wednesday	Undisclosed
17 August 2012	(Colombia) Cristian Montaño	West Ham United	Oldham Athletic	Undisclosed
17 August 2012	Louis Moult	Stoke City	Northampton Town	Free
17 August 2012	Jamie Proctor	Preston North End	(Wales) Swansea City	Undisclosed
17 August 2012	(Netherlands) Robin van Persie	Arsenal	Manchester United	£24m
18 August 2012	(Switzerland) Valentin Gjokaj	Unattached	Derby County	Free
19 August 2012	(Belgium) Kevin Mirallas	(Greece) Olympiacos	Everton	£6m
20 August 2012	Elliott Chamberlain	Leicester City	Exeter City	Free
20 August 2012	Martin Cranie	Coventry City	Barnsley	Free
20 August 2012	Steve Davies	Derby County	Bristol City	Undisclosed
20 August 2012	Paul Hayes	Charlton Athletic	Brentford	Free
20 August 2012	Josh McEachran	Chelsea	Middlesbrough	Loan
20 August 2012	(Spain) Rodri	(Spain) Barcelona B	Sheffield Wednesday	Loan
20 August 2012	(Republic of Ireland) Conor Sammon	Wigan Athletic	Derby County	£1.2m
20 August 2012	(Cameroon) Alex Song	Arsenal	(Spain) Barcelona	£15m
20 August 2012	Stuart Taylor	Manchester City	Reading	Free
21 August 2012	(Cameroon) Sebastien Bassong	Tottenham Hotspur	Norwich City	Undisclosed
21 August 2012	(Netherlands) Alexander Büttner	(Netherlands) Vitesse Arnhem	Manchester United	Undisclosed
21 August 2012	(Togo) Emmanuel Adebayor	Manchester City	Tottenham Hotspur	£5m
21 August 2012	Harry Bunn	Manchester City	Crewe Alexandra	Loan
21 August 2012	Sam Baldock	West Ham United	Bristol City	Undisclosed
21 August 2012	(Jamaica) Ricardo Fuller	Stoke City	Charlton Athletic	Free
22 August 2012	Matthew Connolly	Queens Park Rangers	(Wales) Cardiff City	Undisclosed
22 August 2012	(Wales) Kieron Freeman	Nottingham Forest	Derby County	Undisclosed
22 August 2012	Jake Jervis	Birmingham City	Carlisle United	Loan
22 August 2012	Gavin Massey	Watford	Colchester United	Free
23 August 2012	(France) Anderson Banvo	(France) Paris Saint-Germain	Blackpool	Free
23 August 2012	(Italy) Marco Cassetti	(Italy) Udinese	Watford	Loan
23 August 2012	(France) Brice Irie-Bi	(France) Lille	Blackpool	Free
23 August 2012	(Democratic Republic of the Congo) Archange Nkumu	Chelsea	Yeovil Town	Loan
23 August 2012	(United States) Robbie Rogers	Leeds United	Stevenage	Loan
24 August 2012	(Spain) César Azpilicueta	(France) Marseille	Chelsea	£6.5m
24 August 2012	(Belgium) Geoffrey Mujangi Bia	(Belgium) Standard Liège	Watford	Loan
24 August 2012	(Wales) Darcy Blake	(Wales) Cardiff City	Crystal Palace	Undisclosed
24 August 2012	(Democratic Republic of the Congo) Yannick Bolasie	Bristol City	Crystal Palace	Undisclosed
24 August 2012	Lee Cook	Queens Park Rangers	Leyton Orient	Free
24 August 2012	(Scotland) Steven Fletcher	Wolverhampton Wanderers	Sunderland	£12m (rising to £15m)
24 August 2012	Zeki Fryers	Manchester United	(Belgium) Standard Liège	Free
24 August 2012	Matt Jarvis	Wolverhampton Wanderers	West Ham United	£7.5m
24 August 2012	Adam Johnson	Manchester City	Sunderland	Undisclosed
24 August 2012	(South Korea) Ki Sung-Yueng	(Scotland) Celtic	(Wales) Swansea City	£6m
24 August 2012	(Austria) Georg Margreitter	Austria Vienna	Wolverhampton Wanderers	Undisclosed
24 August 2012	Ishmael Miller	Nottingham Forest	Middlesbrough	Loan
24 August 2012	(Brazil) André Moritz	(Turkey) Mersin İdmanyurdu	Crystal Palace	Free
24 August 2012	(Nigeria) Victor Moses	Wigan Athletic	Chelsea	Undisclosed
24 August 2012	(Senegal) Guirane N'Daw	(France) Saint-Étienne	Ipswich Town	Loan
24 August 2012	Liam Ridehalgh	Huddersfield Town	Chesterfield	Loan
24 August 2012	Tommy Smith	Queens Park Rangers	(Wales) Cardiff City	Undisclosed
24 August 2012	James Vaughan	Norwich City	Huddersfield Town	Loan
24 August 2012	(Wales) Joe Walsh	(Wales) Swansea City	Crawley Town	Free
24 August 2012	(Norway) Alexander Tettey	(France) Rennes	Norwich City	Undisclosed
25 August 2012	(United States) Maurice Edu	(Scotland) Rangers	Stoke	Undisclosed
25 August 2012	(Turkey) Nuri Şahin	(Spain) Real Madrid	Liverpool	Loan
27 August 2012	(Togo) Razak Boukari	(France) Rennes	Wolverhampton Wanderers	Undisclosed
27 August 2012	(Croatia) Luka Modrić	Tottenham Hotspur	(Spain) Real Madrid	£30m
28 August 2012	Daniel Boateng	Arsenal	Oxford United	Loan
28 August 2012	Jimmy Bullard	Ipswich Town	Milton Keynes Dons	Free
28 August 2012	David Button	Tottenham Hotspur	Charlton Athletic	Undisclosed
28 August 2012	Henri Lansbury	Arsenal	Nottingham Forest	Undisclosed
28 August 2012	(Zambia) Emmanuel Mayuka	(Switzerland) Young Boys	Southampton	Undisclosed
28 August 2012	David Prutton	Sheffield Wednesday	Scunthorpe United	Loan
29 August 2012	Tom Adeyemi	Norwich City	Brentford	Loan
29 August 2012	Jake Bidwell	Everton	Brentford	Loan
29 August 2012	Joe Bennett	Middlesbrough	Aston Villa	Undisclosed
29 August 2012	Mark Bunn	Blackburn Rovers	Norwich City	Undisclosed
29 August 2012	(Brazil) Júlio César	(Italy) Inter Milan	Queens Park Rangers	Undisclosed
29 August 2012	(Belgium) Mousa Dembélé	Fulham	Tottenham Hotspur	Undisclosed
29 August 2012	Danny East	Hull City	Northampton Town	Loan
29 August 2012	(France) Bakary Sako	(France) Saint-Étienne	Wolverhampton Wanderers	Undisclosed
30 August 2012	(Netherlands) Roland Bergkamp	Brighton & Hove Albion	(Netherlands) VVV-Venlo	Loan
30 August 2012	John Bostock	Tottenham Hotspur	Swindon Town	Loan
30 August 2012	(Republic of Ireland) Paul Corry	(Republic of Ireland) University College Dublin	Sheffield Wednesday	Undisclosed
30 August 2012	Andy Carroll	Liverpool	West Ham United	Loan
30 August 2012	(Egypt) Ahmed Elmohamady	Sunderland	Hull City	Loan
30 August 2012	(Spain) Esteban Granero	(Spain) Real Madrid	Queens Park Rangers	Undisclosed
30 August 2012	Craig Noone	Brighton & Hove Albion	(Wales) Cardiff City	£1m
30 August 2012	(Scotland) Jordan Rhodes	Huddersfield Town	Blackburn Rovers	£8m
30 August 2012	Charlie Taylor	Leeds United	York City	Loan
30 August 2012	(Northern Ireland) Adam Thompson	Watford	Wycombe Wanderers	Loan
30 August 2012	Darren Ward	Millwall	Swindon Town	Loan
30 August 2012	(Japan) Maya Yoshida	(Netherlands) VVV-Venlo	Southampton	Undisclosed
31 August 2012	(Scotland) Charlie Adam	Liverpool	Stoke City	£5m
31 August 2012	(Ghana) Patrick Agyemang	Queens Park Rangers	Stevenage	Free
31 August 2012	Joey Barton	Queens Park Rangers	(France) Marseille	Loan
31 August 2012	(Italy) Cristian Battocchio	(Italy) Udinese	Watford	Loan
31 August 2012	(Israel) Yossi Benayoun	Chelsea	West Ham United	Loan
31 August 2012	(Denmark) Nicklas Bendtner	Arsenal	(Italy) Juventus	Loan
31 August 2012	Dale Bennett	Watford	AFC Wimbledon	Loan
31 August 2012	(Belgium) Christian Benteke	(Belgium) Genk	Aston Villa	Undisclosed
31 August 2012	(Bulgaria) Dimitar Berbatov	Manchester United	Fulham	Undisclosed
31 August 2012	(Argentina) Federico Bessone	(Wales) Swansea City	Swindon Town	Free
31 August 2012	George Brislen-Hall	Arsenal	(Scotland) Inverness Caledonian Thistle	Free
31 August 2012	(Republic of Ireland) Cian Bolger	Leicester City	Bristol Rovers	Loan
31 August 2012	Jay Bothroyd	Queens Park Rangers	Sheffield Wednesday	Loan
31 August 2012	Jordan Bowery	Chesterfield	Aston Villa	£500k
31 August 2012	(Belgium) Dedryck Boyata	Manchester City	(Netherlands) FC Twente	Loan
31 August 2012	(Republic of Ireland) Paul Caddis	Swindon Town	Birmingham City	Loan
31 August 2012	Nathaniel Chalobah	Chelsea	Watford	Loan
31 August 2012	Giles Coke	Sheffield Wednesday	Swindon Town	Loan
31 August 2012	James Coppinger	Doncaster Rovers	Nottingham Forest	Loan
31 August 2012	(United States) Cody Cropper	Unattached	Southampton	Free
31 August 2012	(Netherlands) Nigel de Jong	Manchester City	(Italy) Milan	Undisclosed
31 August 2012	(Iran) Ashkan Dejagah	(Germany) VfL Wolfsburg	Fulham	Undisclosed
31 August 2012	(Republic of Ireland) Damien Delaney	Ipswich Town	Crystal Palace	Free
31 August 2012	Nathan Delfouneso	Aston Villa	Blackpool	Loan
31 August 2012	(United States) Clint Dempsey	Fulham	Tottenham Hotspur	£6m
31 August 2012	(Scotland) Stephen Dobbie	(Wales) Swansea City	Brighton & Hove Albion	Undisclosed
31 August 2012	(Mexico) Giovani dos Santos	Tottenham Hotspur	(Spain) Mallorca	Undisclosed
31 August 2012	Paul Dummett	Newcastle United	(Scotland) St Mireen	Loan
31 August 2012	Nathan Eccleston	Liverpool	Blackpool	Undisclosed
31 August 2012	(Ghana) Michael Essien	Chelsea	(Spain) Real Madrid	Loan
31 August 2012	(Sweden) Joel Ekstrand	(Italy) Udinese	Watford	Loan
31 August 2012	(France) Jean-Alain Fanchone	(Italy) Udinese	Watford	Loan
31 August 2012	Kane Ferdinand	Southend United	Peterborough United	£200k
31 August 2012	George Francomb	Norwich City	AFC Wimbledon	Loan
31 August 2012	(Spain) Javi García	(Portugal) Benfica	Manchester City	£16m
31 August 2012	(Spain) Roman Golobart	Wigan Athletic	Tranmere Rovers	Loan
31 August 2012	(Scotland) David Goodwillie	Blackburn Rovers	Crystal Palace	Loan
31 August 2012	Adam Hammill	Wolverhampton Wanderers	Huddersfield Town	Loan
31 August 2012	Dean Hammond	Southampton	Brighton & Hove Albion	Loan
31 August 2012	(Portugal) Nuno Henrique	(Portugal) Académica	Blackburn Rovers	Undisclosed
31 August 2012	(Spain) Pablo Hernández	(Spain) Valencia	(Wales) Swansea City	£5.55m
31 August 2012	Mike Jones	Sheffield Wednesday	Crawley Town	Undisclosed
31 August 2012	(France) Gaël Kakuta	Chelsea	(Netherlands) Vitesse Arnhem	Loan
31 August 2012	Harry Kane	Tottenham Hotspur	Norwich City	Loan
31 August 2012	(Scotland) Matthew Kennedy	(Scotland) Kilmarnock	Everton	Nominal
31 August 2012	(France) Hugo Lloris	(France) Lyon	Tottenham Hotspur	£11.8m
31 August 2012	(Spain) David López	(Spain) Athletic Bilbao	Brighton & Hove Albion	Free
31 August 2012	(Scotland) Alex MacDonald	Burnley	Plymouth Argyle	Loan
31 August 2012	Sam Magri	Portsmouth	Queens Park Rangers	Free
31 August 2012	(Brazil) Maicon	(Italy) Internazionale	Manchester City	Undisclosed
31 August 2012	Nicky Maynard	West Ham United	(Wales) Cardiff City	£2.5m
31 August 2012	(Cameroon) Stéphane Mbia	(France) Marseille	Queens Park Rangers	Undisclosed
31 August 2012	David McGoldrick	Nottingham Forest	Coventry City	Loan
31 August 2012	(Republic of Ireland) Ryan McGivern	Manchester City	(Scotland) Hibernian	Loan
31 August 2012	(Serbia) Matija Nastasić	(Italy) Fiorentina	Manchester City	£10m
31 August 2012	(France) Steven Nzonzi	Blackburn Rovers	Stoke City	£3.5m
31 August 2012	(Spain) Andrea Orlandi	(Wales) Swansea City	Brighton & Hove Albion	Undisclosed
31 August 2012	(Costa Rica) Bryan Oviedo	(Denmark) Copenhagen	Everton	£5m
31 August 2012	(South Korea) Park Chu-Young	Arsenal	(Spain) Celta Vigo	Loan
31 August 2012	Matthew Parsons	Crystal Palace	Wycombe Wanderers	Loan
31 August 2012	(Brazil) Neuton Piccoli	(Italy) Udinese	Watford	Loan
31 August 2012	(North Macedonia) Goran Popov	(Ukraine) Dynamo Kyiv	West Bromwich Albion	Loan
31 August 2012	(Republic of Ireland) Stephen Quinn	Sheffield United	Hull City	Undisclosed
31 August 2012	(Uruguay) Gastón Ramírez	(Italy) Bologna	Southampton	Undisclosed
31 August 2012	Kieran Richardson	Sunderland	Fulham	£2m
31 August 2012	(Republic of Ireland) Adam Rooney	Birmingham City	Swindon Town	Loan
31 August 2012	(Portugal) Diogo Rosado	(Portugal) Sporting CP	Blackburn Rovers	Undisclosed
31 August 2012	Danny Rose	Tottenham Hotspur	Sunderland	Loan
31 August 2012	(Poland) Grzegorz Sandomierski	(Belgium) Genk	Blackburn Rovers	Loan
31 August 2012	(Paraguay) Roque Santa Cruz	Manchester City	(Spain) Málaga	Loan
31 August 2012	(Montenegro) Stefan Savić	Manchester City	(Italy) Fiorentina	Exchange
31 August 2012	Billy Sharp	Southampton	Nottingham Forest	Loan
31 August 2012	Scott Sinclair	(Wales) Swansea City	Manchester City	£6.2m
31 August 2012	Jay Spearing	Liverpool	Bolton Wanderers	Loan
31 August 2012	(Scotland) Ryan Stevenson	Ipswich Town	(Scotland) Hearts	Free
31 August 2012	Cameron Stewart	Hull City	Burnley	Loan
31 August 2012	Martin Taylor	Watford	Sheffield Wednesday	Undisclosed
31 August 2012	(Netherlands) Rafael van der Vaart	Tottenham Hotspur	(Germany) Hamburg SV	£10m
31 August 2012	Richard Wright	Unattached	Manchester City	Free
31 August 2012	Ashley Westwood	Crewe Alexandra	Aston Villa	Undisclosed

- * Signed permanently on 1 July
- ** Signed permanently on 15 June.
- *** Signed officially on 13 July.
