= Lyubomir Vitanov =

Bulgarian footballer

Personal information
- Full name: Lyubomir Vitkov Vitanov
- Date of birth: 11 May 1981 (age 45)
- Place of birth: Gotse Delchev, Bulgaria
- Height: 1.86 m (6 ft 1 in)
- Position: Midfielder

Youth career
- 1992–2000: Pirin Gotse Delchev

Senior career*
Years	Team	Apps	(Gls)
2000–2003	Pirin Gotse Delchev		
2003–2004	Tikveš Kavadarci		
2004–2005	Pirin Gotse Delchev		
2005–2009	Pirin Blagoevgrad	57	(4)
2009–2010	Minyor Pernik	38	(1)
2011–2012	Lokomotiv Plovdiv	34	(2)
2012	Ħamrun Spartans	14	(0)
2013–2014	Pirin Gotse Delchev	32	(2)
2014	Bansko	13	(0)
2015	Pirin Blagoevgrad	12	(0)
2015–2016	Bansko	27	(1)
2016	Pirin Gotse Delchev		
2017–2019	Bansko	12	(0)
- * Club domestic league appearances and goals

Lyubomir Vitanov (Bulgarian: Любомир Витанов; born 11 May 1981 in Gotse Delchev) is a retired Bulgarian football player, who played as a midfielder.

== Career ==
Born in Gotse Delchev, Vitanov started to play football in the local team, Pirin, before moving to Macedonian Tikveš Kavadarci in 2003.

Vitanov played for Pirin Blagoevgrad from June 2005 and made his official debut in Bulgarian A Professional Football Group in a match against Naftex Burgas on 10 September 2005. The result of the match was a 2–1 win for Pirin.

In January 2017, Vitanov returned to Bansko.
