= List of Dutch football transfers summer 2012 =

This is a list of transfers in Dutch football for the 2012 Summer transfer window. Only moves featuring an Eredivisie side are listed.

The summer transfer window will open on July 1, 2012, and will close on August 31. Deals may be signed at any given moment in the season, but the actual transfer may only take place during the transfer window. Unattached players may sign at any moment.

Date	Name	Moving from	Moving to	Fee
3 August 2011^{1}	(Kosovo) Shkodran Metaj	(Netherlands) FC Groningen	(Netherlands) FC Emmen	Free
6 November 2011^{1}	(Denmark) Andreas Bjelland	(Denmark) FC Nordsjælland	(Netherlands) FC Twente	€3M
19 December 2011^{1}	(Netherlands) Marc Höcher	(Netherlands) ADO Den Haag	(Netherlands) Willem II Tilburg	Free
7 January 2012^{1}	(Netherlands) Ruud Vormer	(Netherlands) Roda JC	(Netherlands) Feyenoord	Free
14 January 2012^{1}	(Netherlands) Paco van Moorsel	(Netherlands) FC Den Bosch	(Netherlands) FC Groningen	Free
16 January 2012^{1}	(Netherlands) John Goossens	(Netherlands) NEC Nijmegen	(Netherlands) Feyenoord	Free
18 January 2012^{1}	(Netherlands) Ronnie Reniers	(Netherlands) FC Den Bosch	(Netherlands) PEC Zwolle	Free
18 January 2012^{1}	(Poland) Przemysław Tytoń	(Netherlands) Roda JC	(Netherlands) PSV Eindhoven	€2.7M
1 February 2012^{1}	(Netherlands) Daryl Janmaat	(Netherlands) SC Heerenveen	(Netherlands) Feyenoord	Free
12 February 2012^{1}	(Netherlands) Aaron Meijers	(Netherlands) RKC Waalwijk	(Netherlands) ADO Den Haag	Free
22 February 2012^{1}	(Denmark) Zanka	(Denmark) FC Copenhagen	(Netherlands) PSV Eindhoven	Free
22 February 2012	(Norway) Marcus Pedersen	(Netherlands) Vitesse Arnhem	(Norway) Vålerenga IF	Loan
23 February 2012^{1}	(Brazil) Leonardo	(Netherlands) NAC Breda	(Austria) FC Red Bull Salzburg	Free
27 February 2012^{1}	(Netherlands) Joran Pot	(Netherlands) PEC Zwolle	(Netherlands) Go Ahead Eagles	Free
6 March 2012	(Sweden) Kristoffer Nordfeldt	Unattached	(Netherlands) SC Heerenveen	Free
14 March 2012^{1}	(Australia) Brett Holman	(Netherlands) AZ Alkmaar	(England) Aston Villa	Free
26 March 2012^{1}	(Netherlands) Vito Wormgoor	(Netherlands) De Graafschap	(Netherlands) ADO Den Haag	Undisclosed
2 April 2012^{1}	(Netherlands) Mitchell te Vrede	(Netherlands) SBV Excelsior	(Netherlands) Feyenoord	Free
5 April 2012^{1}	(Netherlands) Edwin Gyasi	(Netherlands) De Graafschap	(Netherlands) FC Twente	Free
10 April 2012^{1}	(Serbia) Dušan Tadić	(Netherlands) FC Groningen	(Netherlands) FC Twente	€7.7M
10 April 2012^{1}	(Netherlands) Guus Joppen	(Netherlands) Helmond Sport	(Netherlands) VVV-Venlo	Free
10 April 2012^{1}	(Serbia) Filip Kostic	(Serbia) Radnički 1923	(Netherlands) FC Groningen	€1.25M
11 April 2012^{1}	(Netherlands) Marten de Roon	(Netherlands) Sparta Rotterdam	(Netherlands) SC Heerenveen	Free
16 April 2012^{1}	(Netherlands) Tim Breukers	(Netherlands) Heracles Almelo	(Netherlands) FC Twente	Free
17 April 2012^{1}	(Belgium) Funso Ojo	(Netherlands) PSV Eindhoven	(Belgium) Germinal Beerschot	Free
18 April 2012^{1}	(Netherlands) Robbin Ruiter	(Netherlands) FC Volendam	(Netherlands) FC Utrecht	Free
18 April 2012^{1}	(Morocco) Zakaria Labyad	(Netherlands) PSV Eindhoven	(Portugal) Sporting CP	Free
18 April 2012^{1}	(Denmark) Lasse Schøne	(Netherlands) NEC Nijmegen	(Netherlands) AFC Ajax	Free
24 April 2012^{1}	(Netherlands) Dennis Telgenkamp	(Netherlands) Heracles Almelo	(Netherlands) SC Cambuur	Loan
26 April 2012^{1}	(Netherlands) Geert Arend Roorda	(Netherlands) SC Heerenveen	(Netherlands) NEC Nijmegen	Free
26 April 2012^{1}	(Netherlands) Stijn de Looijer	(Netherlands) FC Den Bosch	(Netherlands) NEC Nijmegen	Free
30 April 2012^{1}	(Netherlands) Danny van den Meiracker	(Netherlands) SV Spakenburg	(Netherlands) NEC Nijmegen	Undisclosed
30 April 2012^{1}	(Netherlands) Arjan Swinkels	(Netherlands) Willem II Tilburg	(Belgium) Lierse SK	Free
1 May 2012^{1}	(Finland) Joonas Kolkka	(Netherlands) Willem II Tilburg	(United States) Dayton Dutch Lions FC	Free
3 May 2012^{1}	(Netherlands) Dion Malone	(Netherlands) Almere City FC	(Netherlands) ADO Den Haag	Free
8 May 2012^{1}	(Netherlands) Denzel Slager	(Netherlands) Jong FC Utrecht	(Netherlands) RKC Waalwijk	Free
10 May 2012^{1}	(Germany) Mark Uth	(Germany) 1. FC Köln	(Netherlands) SC Heerenveen	Free
11 May 2012^{1}	(Netherlands) Jeffrey Altheer	(Netherlands) Helmond Sport	(Netherlands) VVV-Venlo	Undisclosed
14 May 2012^{1}	(Netherlands) Mark van Bommel	(Italy) AC Milan	(Netherlands) PSV Eindhoven	Free
15 May 2012^{1}	(Netherlands) Kees van Buuren	(Netherlands) FC Den Bosch	(Netherlands) Willem II Tilburg	Free
15 May 2012^{1}	(Netherlands) Jordens Peters	(Netherlands) FC Den Bosch	(Netherlands) Willem II Tilburg	Free
17 May 2012^{1}	(Turkey) Ömer Bayram	(Netherlands) NAC Breda	(Turkey) Kayserispor	€500K
20 May 2012^{1}	(Netherlands) Gaby Jallo	(Netherlands) Heracles Almelo	(Netherlands) Willem II Tilburg	Free
20 May 2012^{1}	(Germany) Philipp Haastrup	(Netherlands) Helmond Sport	(Netherlands) Willem II Tilburg	Free
21 May 2012^{1}	(Netherlands) Giovanni Gravenbeek	(Netherlands) Willem II Tilburg	(Netherlands) PEC Zwolle	Free
21 May 2012^{1}	(Netherlands) Nick Marsman	(Netherlands) FC Twente	(Netherlands) Go Ahead Eagles	Loan
22 May 2012^{1}	(Netherlands) Michael de Leeuw	(Netherlands) De Graafschap	(Netherlands) FC Groningen	Free
22 May 2012^{1}	(Netherlands) Mitchell Schet	(Netherlands) RKC Waalwijk	(Netherlands) FC Groningen	Free
22 May 2012^{1}	(Netherlands) Género Zeefuik	(Netherlands) PSV Eindhoven	(Netherlands) FC Groningen	€550K
24 May 2012^{1}	(Netherlands) Ola John	(Netherlands) FC Twente	(Portugal) Benfica	€9M
25 May 2012^{1}	(Netherlands) Florian Jozefzoon	(Netherlands) AFC Ajax	(Netherlands) RKC Waalwijk	Free
26 May 2012^{1}	(Netherlands) Boy Waterman	(Germany) Alemannia Aachen	(Netherlands) PSV Eindhoven	Free
29 May 2012^{1}	(Finland) Niki Mäenpää	(Netherlands) AZ Alkmaar	(Netherlands) VVV-Venlo	Free
29 May 2012^{1}	(Netherlands) Rangelo Janga	(Netherlands) Willem II Tilburg	(Netherlands) SBV Excelsior	Free
29 May 2012^{1}	(Nigeria) Michael Uchebo	(Netherlands) VVV-Venlo	(Belgium) Cercle Brugge	Free
30 May 2012^{1}	(Poland) Filip Kurto	(Poland) Wisla Krakow	(Netherlands) Roda JC	Free
30 May 2012^{1}	(Netherlands) Said Bakkati	(Netherlands) PEC Zwolle	(Netherlands) FC Emmen	Free
1 June 2012^{1}	(Belgium) Ken Leemans	(Netherlands) VVV-Venlo	(Germany) Hansa Rostock	Free
1 June 2012^{1}	(Netherlands) Fred Benson	Unattached	(Netherlands) PEC Zwolle	Free
1 June 2012^{1}	(Netherlands) Bas Dost	(Netherlands) SC Heerenveen	(Germany) VfL Wolfsburg	€9M
1 June 2012^{1}	(Netherlands) Ismo Vorstermans	(Netherlands) FC Utrecht	(Netherlands) VVV-Venlo	Loan
2 June 2012^{1}	(Netherlands) Ruud Swinkels	(Netherlands) FC Eindhoven	(Netherlands) PSV Eindhoven	Free
4 June 2012^{1}	(Netherlands) Mikhail Rosheuvel	(Netherlands) Almere City FC	(Netherlands) AZ Alkmaar	Free
5 June 2012^{1}	(Netherlands) Quenten Martinus	(Netherlands) SC Heerenveen	(Netherlands) Sparta Rotterdam	Loan
6 June 2012^{1}	(Netherlands) Antoine van der Linden	(Netherlands) Heracles Almelo	(Netherlands) FC Emmen	Free
6 June 2012^{1}	(Iraq) Anmar Almubaraki	(Netherlands) Heracles Almelo	(Netherlands) FC Emmen	Free
6 June 2012^{1}	(Sweden) Viktor Elm	(Netherlands) SC Heerenveen	(Netherlands) AZ Alkmaar	Free
6 June 2012^{1}	(Netherlands) Lex Immers	(Netherlands) ADO Den Haag	(Netherlands) Feyenoord	€900K
6 June 2012^{1}	(Netherlands) Kevin Jansen	(Netherlands) Feyenoord	(Netherlands) ADO Den Haag	Player exchange
6 June 2012^{1}	(Finland) Jukka Raitala	(Germany) TSG 1899 Hoffenheim	(Netherlands) SC Heerenveen	€800K
6 June 2012^{1}	(Netherlands) Evander Sno	(Netherlands) RKC Waalwijk	(Netherlands) NEC Nijmegen	Free
7 June 2012^{1}	(Netherlands) Brian van Loo	(Netherlands) FC Groningen	(Netherlands) Heracles Almelo	Free
7 June 2012^{1}	(Netherlands) Renze Fij	(Netherlands) FC Groningen	(Netherlands) Heracles Almelo	Free
7 June 2012^{1}	(Netherlands) Roald van Hout	(Netherlands) RKC Waalwijk	(Netherlands) Sparta Rotterdam	Free
7 June 2012^{1}	(Czech Republic) Michal Svec	(Netherlands) SC Heerenveen	(Slovakia) ŠK Slovan Bratislava	Free
8 June 2012^{1}	(Netherlands) Olivier ter Horst	(Netherlands) Heracles Almelo	(Netherlands) Helmond Sport	Free
8 June 2012^{1}	(Netherlands) Joost Broerse	(Netherlands) SBV Excelsior	(Netherlands) PEC Zwolle	Free
11 June 2012^{1}	(Netherlands) Oğuzhan Türk	(Netherlands) SC Cambuur	(Netherlands) VVV-Venlo	Free
11 June 2012^{1}	(Belgium) Stijn Wuytens	(Netherlands) PSV Eindhoven	(Belgium) Germinal Beerschot	Free
12 June 2012^{1}	(Belgium) Bart Buysse	(Netherlands) FC Twente	(Belgium) Club Brugge	Free
13 June 2012^{1}	(Netherlands) Ricky van Haaren	(Netherlands) Feyenoord	(Netherlands) VVV-Venlo	Free
13 June 2012^{1}	(Chile) Felipe Gutiérrez	(Chile) Universidad Catolica	(Netherlands) FC Twente	€2.8M
13 June 2012^{1}	(Ghana) Matthew Amoah	(Turkey) Mersin Idman Yurdu	(Netherlands) SC Heerenveen	Free
14 June 2012^{1}	(Chile) Stefano Magnasco	(Chile) Universidad Catolica	(Netherlands) FC Groningen	€480K
14 June 2012^{1}	(Netherlands) Marco Bizot	(Netherlands) AFC Ajax	(Netherlands) FC Groningen	Free
15 June 2012^{1}	(Netherlands) Koen van de Laak	(Netherlands) FC Groningen	(South Africa) Ajax Cape Town	Free
15 June 2012^{1}	(Netherlands) Gieljan Tissingh	(Netherlands) PEC Zwolle	(Netherlands) AGOVV	Free
15 June 2012^{1}	(Netherlands) Karim Fachtali	(Netherlands) RKC Waalwijk	(Kazakhstan) FC Kaisar	Free
16 June 2012^{1}	(Norway) Omar Elabdellaoui	(England) Manchester City	(Netherlands) Feyenoord	Loan
16 June 2012^{1}	(Netherlands) Evert Brouwers	(Netherlands) FC Utrecht	(Netherlands) AGOVV	Free
17 June 2012^{1}	(Netherlands) Robbert Schilder	(Netherlands) NAC Breda	(Netherlands) FC Twente	€1.5M
18 June 2012^{1}	(Netherlands) Ferry de Regt	(Netherlands) VVV-Venlo	(Netherlands) Helmond Sport	Loan
18 June 2012^{1}	(Netherlands) Danny Holla	(Netherlands) FC Groningen	(Netherlands) ADO Den Haag	€167.5K
18 June 2012^{1}	(Netherlands) Rydell Poepon	(Netherlands) De Graafschap	(Netherlands) ADO Den Haag	€300K
18 June 2012^{1}	(Denmark) Mads Junker	(Netherlands) Roda JC	(Belgium) KV Mechelen	Free
18 June 2012^{1}	(Netherlands) André Krul	(Netherlands) FC Utrecht	(Malta) Valletta FC	Free
18 June 2012^{1}	(Netherlands) Lion Kaak	(Netherlands) De Graafschap	(Netherlands) AGOVV	Free
19 June 2012^{1}	(Netherlands) Marco van Duin	(Netherlands) NEC Nijmegen	(Netherlands) Sparta Rotterdam	Free
19 June 2012^{1}	(Netherlands) Cayfano Latupeirissa	(Netherlands) NEC Nijmegen	(Netherlands) FC Oss	Loan
20 June 2012^{1}	(Netherlands) Frank Demouge	(Netherlands) FC Utrecht	(England) AFC Bournemouth	Free
21 June 2012^{1}	(Denmark) Thomas Enevoldsen	(Netherlands) FC Groningen	(Belgium) KV Mechelen	€275K
24 June 2012	(Netherlands) Jeroen Veldmate	(Netherlands) Sparta Rotterdam	(Netherlands) Heracles Almelo	€220K
26 June 2012	(Netherlands) Steven Berghuis	(Netherlands) FC Twente	(Netherlands) AZ Alkmaar	€500K
26 June 2012	(Netherlands) Yves De Winter	(Netherlands) De Graafschap	(Netherlands) AZ Alkmaar	€200K
27 June 2012	(Netherlands) Donny Gorter	(Netherlands) NAC Breda	(Netherlands) AZ Alkmaar	€350K
27 June 2012	(Germany) Thilo Leugers	(Netherlands) FC Twente	(Netherlands) NAC Breda	Loan
27 June 2012	(Sweden) Petter Andersson	(Netherlands) FC Groningen	(Denmark) FC Midtjylland	Free
27 June 2012	(Netherlands) Wouter de Vogel	(Netherlands) ADO Den Haag	(Netherlands) FC Den Bosch	Loan
27 June 2012	(Netherlands) Peter Jungschläger	(Australia) Gold Coast United	(Netherlands) RKC Waalwijk	Free
29 June 2012	(Netherlands) Christian Kum	(Netherlands) ADO Den Haag	(Netherlands) SC Heerenveen	Free
29 June 2012	(Netherlands) Mark Looms	(Netherlands) Heracles Almelo	(Netherlands) NAC Breda	Free
29 June 2012	(Portugal) Danilo Pereira	(Italy) Parma	(Netherlands) Roda JC	Loan
29 June 2012	(Netherlands) Wiljan Pluim	(Netherlands) Vitesse Arnhem	(Netherlands) PEC Zwolle	Loan
1 July 2012	(Slovakia) Filip Luksik	(Netherlands) ADO Den Haag	(Slovakia) Slovan Bratislava	Loan
2 July 2012	(Morocco) Karim El Ahmadi	(Netherlands) Feyenoord	(England) Aston Villa	€2.8M
2 July 2012	(Estonia) Ragnar Klavan	(Netherlands) AZ Alkmaar	(Germany) FC Augsburg	€250K
2 July 2012	(Denmark) Nicklas Pedersen	(Netherlands) FC Groningen	(Belgium) KV Mechelen	€350K
2 July 2012	(Netherlands) Alje Schut	(Netherlands) FC Utrecht	(South Africa) Mamelodi Sundowns	Free
3 July 2012	(Netherlands) Charlison Benschop	(Netherlands) AZ Alkmaar	(France) Brest	€1.3M
5 July 2012	(Germany) Dragan Paljić	(Poland) Wisła Kraków	(Netherlands) Heracles Almelo	Free
5 July 2012	(Norway) Harmeet Singh	(Norway) Vålerenga IF	(Netherlands) Feyenoord	€600K
5 July 2012	(Croatia) Dario Vujicevic	Unattached	(Netherlands) Heracles Almelo	Free
6 July 2012	(Morocco) Anouar Hadouir	(Germany) Alemannia Aachen	(Netherlands) NAC Breda	Free
6 July 2012	(Netherlands) Milano Koenders	(Netherlands) AZ Alkmaar	(Netherlands) Heracles Almelo	Free
6 July 2012	(Netherlands) Leon Broekhof	(Netherlands) Roda JC	(Netherlands) SC Cambuur	Free
6 July 2012	(Netherlands) Michel Breuer	(Netherlands) SC Heerenveen	(Netherlands) NEC Nijmegen	Free
7 July 2012	(Netherlands) Abel Tamata	(Netherlands) PSV Eindhoven	(Netherlands) Roda JC	Loan
9 July 2012	(Sweden) Andreas Isaksson	(Netherlands) PSV Eindhoven	(Turkey) Kasımpaşa	Free
10 July 2012	(Netherlands) Otman Bakkal	(Netherlands) PSV Eindhoven	(Russia) Dynamo Moscow	Free
10 July 2012	(Sweden) Emir Bajrami	(Netherlands) FC Twente	(France) AS Monaco	Loan
10 July 2012	(Germany) Christian Dorda	(Germany) spVgg Greuther Fürth	(Netherlands) Heracles Almelo	Free
10 July 2012	(Netherlands) Rodney Sneijder	(Netherlands) AFC Ajax	(Netherlands) RKC Waalwijk	Free
11 July 2012	(Morocco) Mounir El Hamdaoui	(Netherlands) AFC Ajax	(Italy) Fiorentina	€800K
12 July 2012	(Belgium) Jan Vertonghen	(Netherlands) AFC Ajax	(England) Tottenham Hotspur	€12.5M
12 July 2012	(Netherlands) Jules Reimerink	(Germany) Energie Cottbus	(Netherlands) VVV-Venlo	Free
13 July 2012	(Netherlands) Gianni Zuiverloon	(Spain) Mallorca	(Netherlands) SC Heerenveen	Loan
14 July 2012	(Netherlands) Kevin van Diermen	(Netherlands) Vitesse Arnhem	(Netherlands) Excelsior Rotterdam	Free
15 July 2012	(Netherlands) Luciano Narsingh	(Netherlands) SC Heerenveen	(Netherlands) PSV Eindhoven	€4.1M
16 July 2012	(Netherlands) Geoffrey Castillion	(Netherlands) AFC Ajax	(Netherlands) SC Heracles	Loan
16 July 2012	(Germany) Niclas Heimann	(Austria) Red Bull Salzburg	(Netherlands) VVV-Venlo	Free
17 July 2012	(Netherlands) Robbert Schilder	(Netherlands) NAC Breda	(Netherlands) FC Twente	€900K
18 July 2012	(Netherlands) Luuk de Jong	(Netherlands) FC Twente	(Germany) Borussia Mönchengladbach	€15M
18 July 2012	(Hungary) Krisztián Németh	(Greece) Olympiakos	(Netherlands) Roda JC	Free
20 July 2012	(Russia) Dmitri Bulykin	(Netherlands) AFC Ajax	(Netherlands) FC Twente	Free
25 July 2012	(Argentina) Darío Cvitanich	(Netherlands) AFC Ajax	(France) OGC Nice	€1.5M
25 July 2012	(Denmark) Søren Rieks	(Denmark) Esbjerg fB	(Netherlands) NEC Nijmegen	Free
25 July 2012	(France) Teddy Chevalier	(Belgium) SV Zulte-Waregem	(Netherlands) RKC Waalwijk	€100K
27 July 2012	(Netherlands) Norichio Nieveld	(Netherlands) Excelsior Rotterdam	(Netherlands) PEC Zwolle	Free
27 July 2012	(Spain) Dani Daniel Fernandez Artola	(Netherlands) Feyenoord Rotterdam	(Belgium) KRC Genk	Free
30 July 2012	(Netherlands) Luc Castaignos	(Italy) Internazionale	(Netherlands) FC Twente	€6M
30 July 2012	(Sweden) Rasmus Elm	(Netherlands) AZ Alkmaar	(Russia) CSKA Moscow	€6.5M
31 July 2012	(Sweden) Erton Fejzullahu	(Netherlands) NEC Nijmegen	(Sweden) Djurgårdens IF	€200K
31 July 2012	(Germany) Simon Cziommer	(Austria) Red Bull Salzburg	(Netherlands) Vitesse Arnhem	Free
1 August 2012	(Netherlands) Ron Vlaar	(Netherlands) Feyenoord	(England) Aston Villa	€3.8M
1 August 2012	(Sweden) Tobias Sana	(Sweden) IFK Göteborg	(Netherlands) AFC Ajax	€400K
2 August 2012	(Netherlands) Joshua John	(Netherlands) FC Twente	(Denmark) FC Nordsjælland	Loan
4 August 2012	(Netherlands) Alexander Bannink	(Netherlands) FC Twente	(Netherlands) FC Emmen	Free
5 August 2012	(Belgium) Sepp De Roover	(Belgium) SC Lokeren	(Netherlands) NAC Breda	Loan
6 August 2012	(Morocco) Khalid Sinouh	(Netherlands) PSV Eindhoven	(Netherlands) NEC Nijmegen	Free
8 August 2012	(Netherlands) Jeroen Drost	(Netherlands) Vitesse Arnhem	(Netherlands) De Graafschap	Free
9 August 2012	(Armenia) Aras Özbiliz	(Netherlands) AFC Ajax	(Russia) Kuban Krasnodar	€1M
10 August 2012	(Netherlands) Joris Mathijsen	(Spain) CD Málaga	(Netherlands) Feyenoord	Free
16 August 2012	(Netherlands) Vurnon Anita	(Netherlands) AFC Ajax	(England) Newcastle United	€8.5M
16 August 2012	(Iceland) Alfred Finnbogason	(Belgium) SC Lokeren	(Netherlands) SC Heerenveen	€500K
17 August 2012	(Netherlands) Bart Schenkeveld	(Netherlands) Feyenoord	(Netherlands) SC Heracles	Free
17 August 2012	(Netherlands) Danny Verbeek	(Belgium) Standard Liège	(Netherlands) NAC Breda	Loan
17 August 2012	(Morocco) Oussama Assaidi	(Netherlands) SC Heerenveen	(England) Liverpool F.C.	€4M
17 August 2012	(Morocco) Ismail Aissati	(Netherlands) AFC Ajax	(Turkey) Medical Park Antalyaspor	Free
21 August 2012	(Finland) Niklas Moisander	(Netherlands) AZ Alkmaar	(Netherlands) AFC Ajax	€3.2M
21 August 2012	(Netherlands) Alexander Büttner	(Netherlands) Vitesse Arnhem	(England) Manchester United	€5M
21 August 2012	(Netherlands) Theo Lucius	(Netherlands) FC Eindhoven	(Netherlands) RKC Waalwijk	Free
22 August 2012	(Israel) Dan Mori	(Israel) Bnei Yehuda Tel Aviv	(Netherlands) Vitesse Arnhem	Free
23 August 2012	(Denmark) Christian Poulsen	(France) Evian Thonon Gaillard F.C.	(Netherlands) AFC Ajax	Free
23 August 2012	(Netherlands) Daniël de Ridder	(Switzerland) Grasshopper Club Zürich	(Netherlands) SC Heerenveen	Free
25 August 2012	(Denmark) Simon Poulsen	(Netherlands) AZ Alkmaar	(Italy) Sampdoria	Free
28 August 2012	(Netherlands) Mart Lieder	(Netherlands) Vitesse Arnhem	(Netherlands) RKC Waalwijk	Free
28 August 2012	(Netherlands) Theo Janssen	(Netherlands) AFC Ajax	(Netherlands) Vitesse Arnhem	€550K
29 August 2012	(Netherlands) Danny Hoesen	(England) Fulham F.C.	(Netherlands) AFC Ajax	€500K
29 August 2012	(Netherlands) Furkan Alakmak	(Netherlands) RKC Waalwijk	(Netherlands) FC Eindhoven	Loan
29 August 2012	(Czech Republic) Lukas Marecek	(Belgium) RSC Anderlecht	(Netherlands) SC Heerenveen	Loan
29 August 2012	(Sweden) Denni Avdic	(Germany) Werder Bremen	(Netherlands) PEC Zwolle	Loan
29 August 2012	(Luxembourg) Aurélien Joachim	(Luxembourg) F91 Dudelange	(Netherlands) Willem II Tilburg	Loan
30 August 2012	(Netherlands) Roland Bergkamp	(England) Brighton & Hove Albion F.C.	(Netherlands) VVV-Venlo	Loan
30 August 2012	(Guatemala) Marco Pappa	(United States) Chicago Fire	(Netherlands) SC Heerenveen	Free
30 August 2012	(Japan) Maya Yoshida	(Netherlands) VVV-Venlo	(England) Southampton FC	€2.5M
30 August 2012	(Slovenia) Andraz Kirm	(Poland) Wisla Krakow	(Netherlands) FC Groningen	€300K
30 August 2012	(Netherlands) Jeffrey van Nuland	(Netherlands) Willem II Tilburg	(Netherlands) Helmond Sport	Loan
31 August 2012	(Norway) Marcus Pedersen	(Netherlands) Vitesse Arnhem	(Denmark) Odense Boldklub	Loan
31 August 2012	(Morocco) Nourdin Boukhari	(Netherlands) NAC Breda	(Netherlands) RKC Waalwijk	Non-contract
31 August 2012	(Slovenia) Aleksandar Radosavljevic	(Netherlands) ADO Den Haag	(Netherlands) VVV-Venlo	Loan
31 August 2012	(Netherlands) Ahmed Ammi	(Netherlands) ADO Den Haag	(Netherlands) VVV-Venlo	Loan
31 August 2012	(Germany) Nils Röseler	(Netherlands) FC Twente	(Netherlands) VVV-Venlo	Loan
31 August 2012	(Japan) Yuki Otsu	(Germany) Borussia Mönchengladbach	(Netherlands) VVV-Venlo	Free
31 August 2012	(Netherlands) Bram Nuytinck	(Netherlands) NEC Nijmegen	(Belgium) RSC Anderlecht	€3M
31 August 2012	(Netherlands) Quin Kruijsen	(Netherlands) VVV-Venlo	(Netherlands) Fortuna Sittard	Loan
31 August 2012	(Netherlands) Ryan Babel	(Germany) 1899 Hoffenheim	(Netherlands) AFC Ajax	Free
31 August 2012	(Denmark) Lucas Andersen	(Denmark) Aalborg BK	(Netherlands) AFC Ajax	€1.5M
31 August 2012	(Italy) Graziano Pellè	(Italy) Parma F.C.	(Netherlands) Feyenoord	Loan
31 August 2012	(Netherlands) Wesley Verhoek	(Netherlands) FC Twente	(Netherlands) Feyenoord	Player exchange
31 August 2012	(Netherlands) Jerson Cabral	(Netherlands) Feyenoord	(Netherlands) FC Twente	Player exchange
31 August 2012	(Serbia) Nikola Aksentijevic	(Serbia) FK Partizan	(Netherlands) Vitesse Arnhem	€2M
31 August 2012	(France) Gaël Kakuta	(England) Chelsea FC	(Netherlands) Vitesse Arnhem	Loan
31 August 2012	(Netherlands) Wilko de Vogt	(Netherlands) VVV-Venlo	(Netherlands) NAC Breda	Non-contract
31 August 2012	(Norway) Markus Henriksen	(Norway) Rosenborg BK	(Netherlands) AZ Alkmaar	€2M
31 August 2012	(Netherlands) Glynor Plet	(Netherlands) FC Twente	(Belgium) KRC Genk	Loan
31 August 2012	(Belgium) Dedryck Boyata	(England) Manchester City	(Netherlands) FC Twente	Loan
3 September 2012	(Netherlands) Gregory van der Wiel	(Netherlands) AFC Ajax	(France) Paris Saint-Germain FC	€6M
5 September 2012	(Netherlands) Gianluca Nijholt	(Netherlands) FC Utrecht	(Russia) Amkar Perm	Free
28 September 2012	(Netherlands) Jeroen Verhoeven	Unattached	(Netherlands) FC Utrecht	Free
20 October 2012	(Netherlands) Michael Lamey	Unattached	(Netherlands) RKC Waalwijk	Free
21 November 2012	(Netherlands) Kevin Wattamaleo	Unattached	(Netherlands) NEC Nijmegen	Free

== Notes ==
1. Transfer will take place on 1 July 2012.
