= Segarra (disambiguation) =

Segarra may refer to:

== People ==
- Alynda Segarra, American singer, frontperson of the band Hurray for the Riff Raff
- Annie Segarra (born 1990), a.k.a. Annie Elainey, American YouTuber, artist, and activist for LGBT and disability rights
- Antulio Segarra (1906–1989), officer in the United States Army
- Araceli Segarra (born 1970), first Spanish woman to climb to the summit of Mount Everest
- Aurelia Ramos de Segarra (1860–1927), Uruguayan philanthropist, founder of the Uruguayan Red Cross
- Carmen Segarra, a US New York Federal Reserve–appointed regulator to Goldman Sachs for seven months in 2011-2012
- Francisco Segarra Simón (born 1976), Spanish swimmer
- Iván Segarra Báez (born 1967), Puerto Rican poet
- Joan Segarra (1927–2008), Spanish footballer
- Josh Segarra (born 1986), American actor
- Juan Enrique Segarra-Palmer, Puerto Rican pro-independence activist
- Leo Segarra (born 1981), Spanish singer
- Maniliz Segarra (born 1966), Puerto Rican judoka
- María José Segarra (born 1963), Spanish jurist, Attorney General between 2018 and 2020
- Marta Segarra (born 1963), Spanish philologist, university professor, and researcher
- Myriam Segarra (born 1955), Puerto Rican softball player
- Ninfa Segarra (born 1950), American attorney and politician
- Nino Segarra (born 1954), Puerto Rican singer-songwriter and musician
- Pedro Segarra (born 1959), American politician and mayor of Hartford, Connecticut

== Places ==
- Segarra, comarca in the Province of Lleida, Catalonia, Spain
  - Freixenet de Segarra, a municipality in the comarca of Segarra
  - Granyena de Segarra, a municipality in the comarca of Segarra
  - Montoliu de Segarra, a municipality in the comarca of Segarra
  - Montornès de Segarra, a municipality in the comarca of Segarra
  - Tarroja de Segarra, a municipality in the comarca of Segarra
- Aguilar de Segarra, a municipality in the comarca of Bages, close to Segarra
- Calonge de Segarra, a municipality in the comarca of Anoia, adjacent to Segarra
- Fort Segarra, United States World War II fort on Water Island, U.S. Virgin Islands
