= Joan Margarit =

Catalan architect and poet (1938–2021)

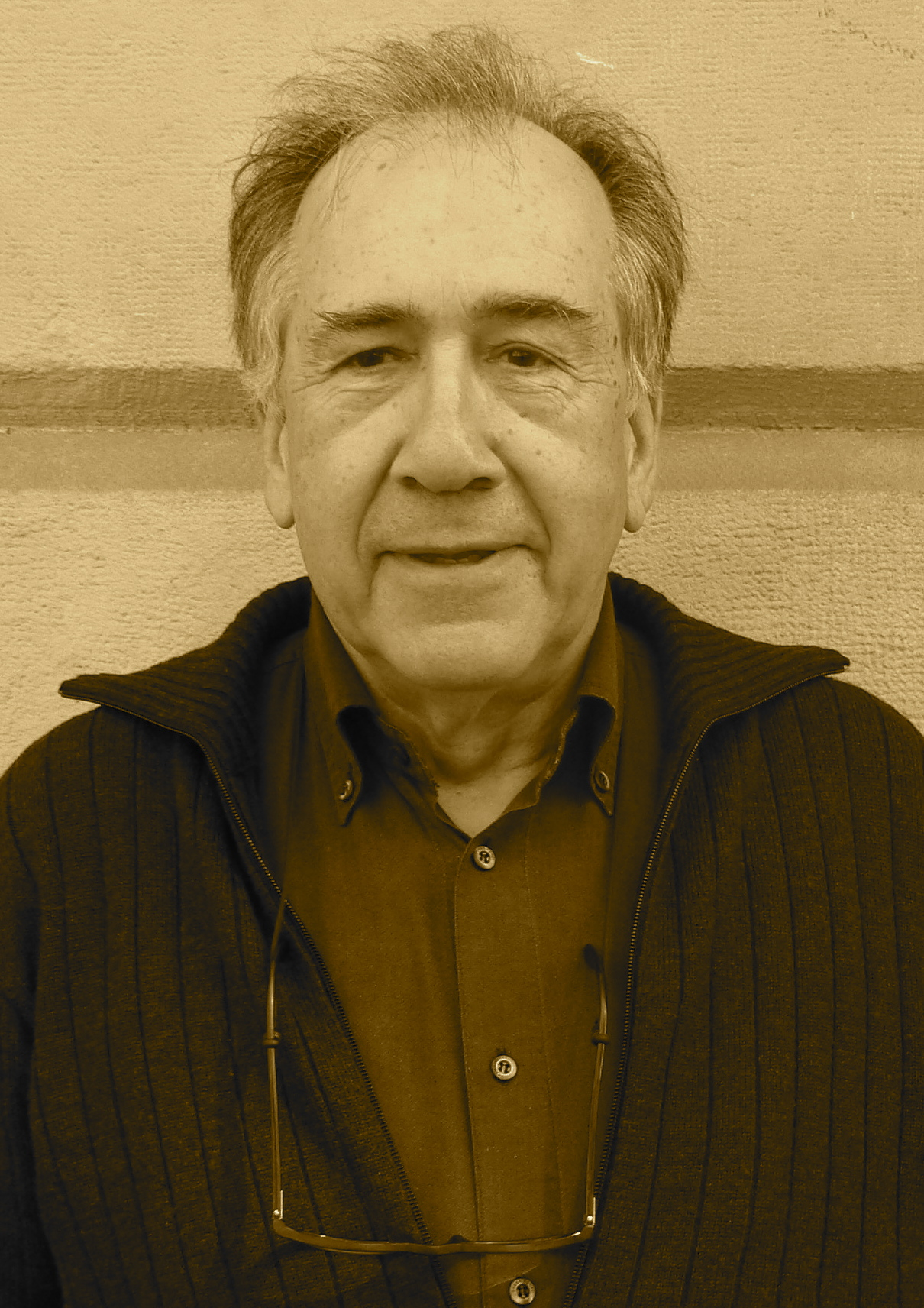
- Born: Joan Margarit i Consarnau; 11 May 1938; Sanaüja (Lleida), Spain
- Died: 16 February 2021 (aged 82); Sant Just Desvern
- Writing career
- Language: Spanish, Catalan

Joan Margarit i Consarnau (Catalan pronunciation: [ʒuˈam məɾɣəˈɾit i kunsəɾˈnaw]; 11 May 1938 – 16 February 2021) was a Catalan poet, architect and professor. Most of his work is written in the Catalan language. He won the 2019 Miguel de Cervantes Prize.

== Life and career ==
Born in Sanaüja to Joan Margarit i Serradell, an architect from Barcelona, and Trinitat Consarnau i Sabaté, a teacher at l'Ametlla de Mar (Tarragona), he grew up at the time of the Spanish Civil War and the Second World War. His family moved to various locations in Catalonia. In 1954, they settled in the Canary Islands, but in 1956 Margarit returned to Barcelona to complete his architecture studies, lodging at the University hall of residence the Col·legi Major Sant Jordi. A year after he finished his studies, he met Mariona Ribalta and they married a year later (1963). They had three daughters (Mònica, Anna and Joana) and a son (Carles).

From 1975, Margarit lived in Sant Just Desvern and from 1980, worked there as an architect with his friend and associate Carles Buxadé. In addition, from 1968 until recently, he was Professor of Structural Calculations at Technical School of Architecture, Barcelona, part of the Polytechnic University of Catalonia.

Margarit started publishing poetry in Spanish in 1963. After a ten-year break, he published Crónica with help from his friend Joaquim Marco, director of the Ocnos series at the publishing house Barral Editores. From 1980 onwards, he began to establish himself as a poet in the Catalan language. His works have been translated into English, Russian and Hebrew. Recitations of Margarit's poems with musical backdrops have been recorded by the musicians Pere Rovira, Gerard Quintana, Araceli Aiguaviva and Miquel Poveda.

In October 2008, Margarit received the Premio Nacional de Poesía for his Casa de Misericordia.

He died aged 82 on 16 February 2021 in Sant Just Desvern after suffering from cancer.

== Awards ==
- Vicent Andrés Estellés Award (1981)
- Miquel de Palol Award (1982)
- Critics Prize erra d’Or (1982, 1987, & 2007)
- Flower Nature Floral Games of Barcelona (1983 & 1985)
- National Critics Award (Spain, 1984 and 2008)
- Carles Riba Award (1985)
- Cadaqués to Quima Jaume Award
- Cavall Verd Award (2005)
- National Literature Award of the Generalitat of Catalonia (2008)
- Rosalía de Castro Award (2008)
- National Prize for Poetry (2008)
- Premio Víctor Sandoval Poetas del Mundo Latino (2013)
- Poetry Book Society Recommended Translation (2016)
- Jaume Fuster Award, of the Associació d’Escriptors en LLengua Catalana (2016)
- Pablo Neruda Ibero-American Poetry Award (Chile, 2017)
- Miguel de Cervantes Prize (2019)

== Works ==
=== Essays in Spanish ===
- Nuevas cartas a un joven poeta (New Letters to a Young Poet), Barril & Barral, 2009. English translation by Christopher Maurer, Chicago, Swan Isle Press, 2011.

=== Poetry in Catalan [this bibliography is not up to date] ===
- L'ombra de l'altre mar Barcelona: Edicions 62, 1981
- Vell malentès València: Eliseu Climent/3i4, 1981
- El passat i la joia Vic: Eumo, 1982
- Cants d'Hekatònim de Tifundis Barcelona: La Gaia Ciència, 1982
- Raquel: la fosca melangia de Robinson Crusoe Barcelona: Edicions 62, 1983
- L'ordre del temps Barcelona: Edicions 62, 1985
- Mar d'hivern Barcelona: Proa, 1986
- Cantata de Sant Just Alacant: Institut d'Estudis Juan Gil-Albert, 1987
- La dona del navegant Barcelona: La Magrana, 1987
- Llum de plua Barcelona: Península, 1987
- Poema per a un fris Barcelona: Escola d'Arquitectes de Barcelona, 1987
- Edat roja Barcelona: Columna, 1990
- Els motius del llop Barcelona: Columna, 1993
- Aiguaforts Barcelona: Columna, 1995
- Remolcadors entre la boira Argentona: L'Aixernador, 1995; translated to English as Tugs in the Fog, Anna Crowe (Bloodaxe Books, 2006)
- Estació de França Madrid: Hiperión, 1999
- Poesia amorosa completa (1980–2000) Barcelona: Proa, 2001
- Joana Barcelona: Proa, 2002
- Els primers freds. Poesia 1975-1995 Barcelona: Proa, 2004
- Càlcul d’estructures Barcelona: Col. Óssa Menor, Enciclopèdia Catalana, 2005
- Casa de Misericòrdia Barcelona: Col. Óssa Menor, Enciclopèdia Catalana, 2007
- Misteriosament feliç Barcelona: Col. Óssa Menor, Enciclopèdia Catalana, 2008
- Noves cartes a un jove poeta Barcelona: Col. Óssa Menor, Enciclopèdia Catalana, 2009
- No era lluny ni difícil Barcelona: Col. Óssa Menor, Enciclopèdia Catalana, 2010

=== Other translated works ===
- In Russian:

Огни мгновений (Flames of the Moments), Saint Petersburg State University, 2003

- In English:

Tugs in the Fog: Selected Poems, tr. Anna Crowe, Bloodaxe Books, 2006
Strangely Happy, tr. Anna Crowe, Bloodaxe Books, 2011
Love Is a Place, tr. Anna Crowe, Bloodaxe Books, 2016

- In Hebrew:

מעולם לא ראיתי את עצמי יווני (I Have Never Seen Myself as a Greek), Shlomo Avayou, Keshev Publishing House, Tel Aviv, 2004
מבט במראה הפנימית (A look in the inner mirror). Shlomo Avayou, Keshev Publishing House, Tel Aviv, 2008
