= Tallada =

Tallada is a Spanish surname. Notable people with the surname include:

- Tomás Cerdán de Tallada (1530–1614), Spanish jurist, humanist, writer, and poet
- José Maria Tallada (1884–1946), Spanish economist, professor, politician, demographer, and sports leader
- Jose Moreno Tallada (born 1952), Spanish international tennis player

== See also ==
- La Tallada, locality in the Province of Lleida, Catalonia
