= Granyena =

Granyena may refer to:

- Granyena de Segarra, village in the comarca of Segarra
- Granyena de les Garrigues, village in the comarca of Garrigues
