= Melio =

Melio may refer to:

== People ==
- Anthony Melio (1932 – 2012), American politician
- Iacopo Melio (born 1992), Italian journalist, writer, politician and activist
- Melio Bettina (1916 – 1996), American boxer

== Geography ==
- Melió, locality located in the municipality of Sant Guim de Freixenet, Spain

== See also ==
- Melia (disambiguation)
