= Torrefeta i Florejacs =

- Municipality
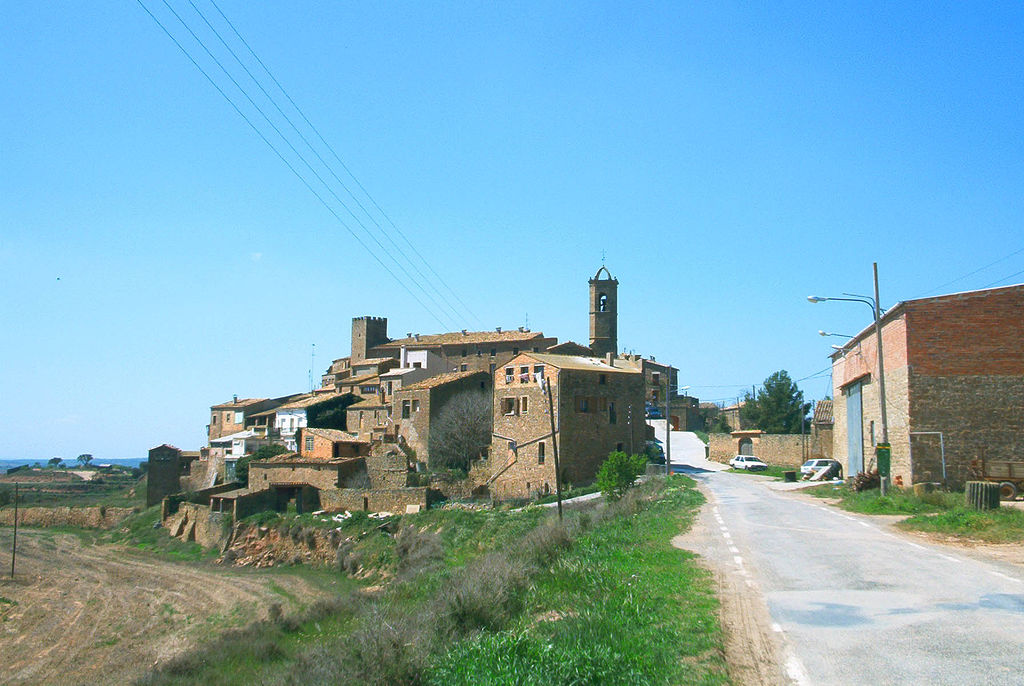
- Florejacs

- Coat of arms

- Location in Catalonia
- Coordinates: 41°45′21″N 1°16′30″E
- Country: Spain
- Community: Catalonia
- Province: Lleida
- Comarca: Segarra

Government
  - Mayor: Núria Magrans Anglés (2015)

Area
  - Total: 88.9 km^{2} (34.3 sq mi)

Population (2025-01-01)
  - Total: 589
  - Density: 6.63/km^{2} (17.2/sq mi)
- Website: torrefeta.ddl.net

Torrefeta i Florejacs (Catalan pronunciation: [ˌtoreˈfetaj floɾeˈʒaks]) is a municipality in the province of Lleida and autonomous community of Catalonia, Spain. It has a population of 589 (register office, 2025).

The municipality is split into two parts, separated by the municipality of Sanaüja. The bigger southern part contains nearly all the population.
