= Sant Ramon =

- Municipality
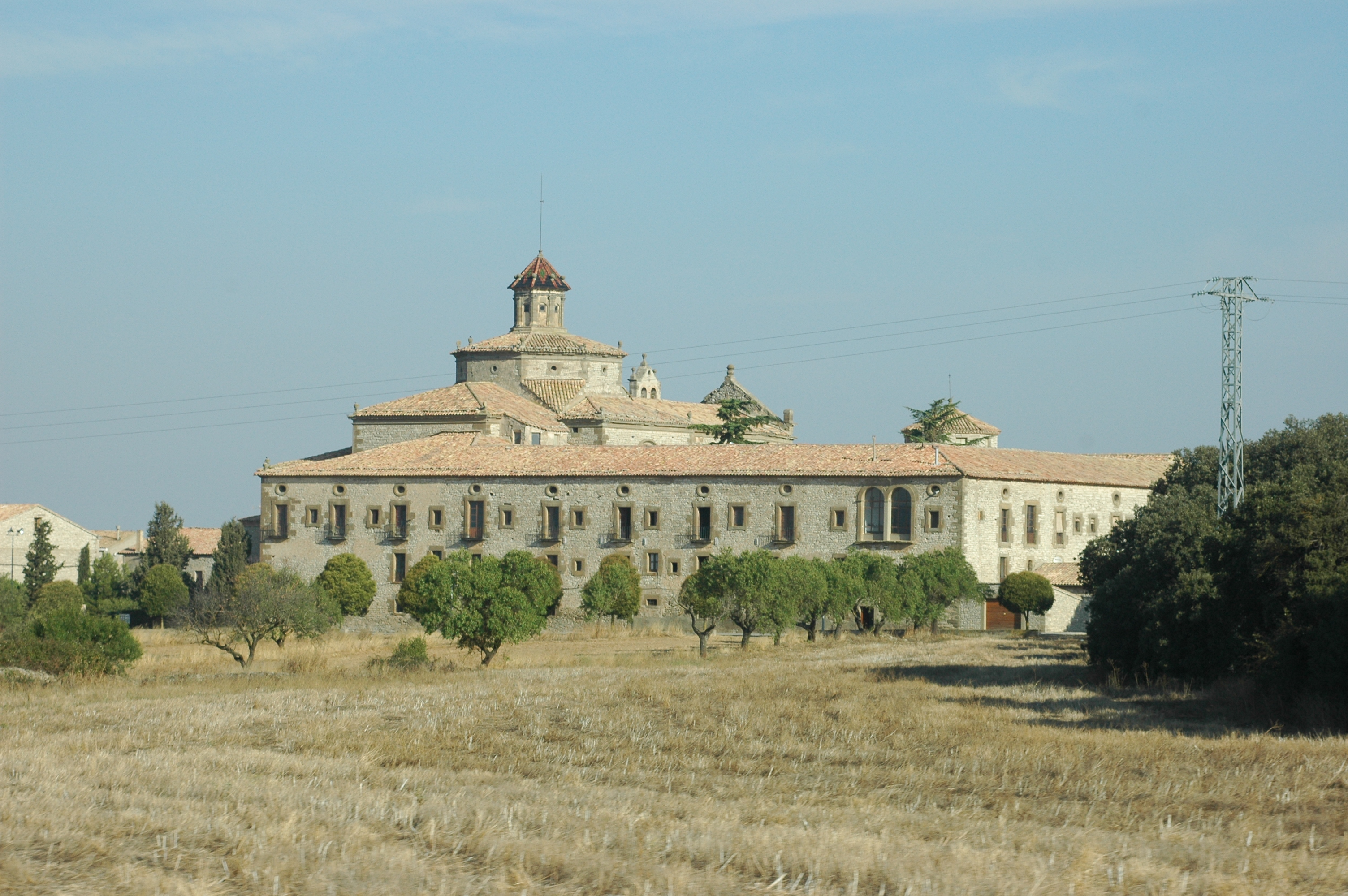
- Convent of Sant Ramon de Portell

- Location in Catalonia
- Coordinates: 41°43′39″N 1°21′46″E
- Country: Spain
- Community: Catalonia
- Province: Lleida
- Comarca: Segarra

Government
  - Mayor: Josep Maria Ribera Currià (2021)

Area
  - Total: 18.5 km^{2} (7.1 sq mi)

Population (2025-01-01)
  - Total: 483
  - Density: 26.1/km^{2} (67.6/sq mi)
- Website: santramon.ddl.net

Sant Ramon (Catalan pronunciation: [ˈsan raˈmon]) is a municipality in the county of Segarra, in Catalonia. It includes the villages of Gospí, Portell and Viver de Segarra. The name references Saint Raymond Nonnatus because he was born in Portell.

== Demographics ==
It has a population of 483 (register office, 2025).

Demographic evolution
1900	1930	1950	1970	1981	1986
1113	1028	962	700	652	616
