= Estaràs =

- Municipality
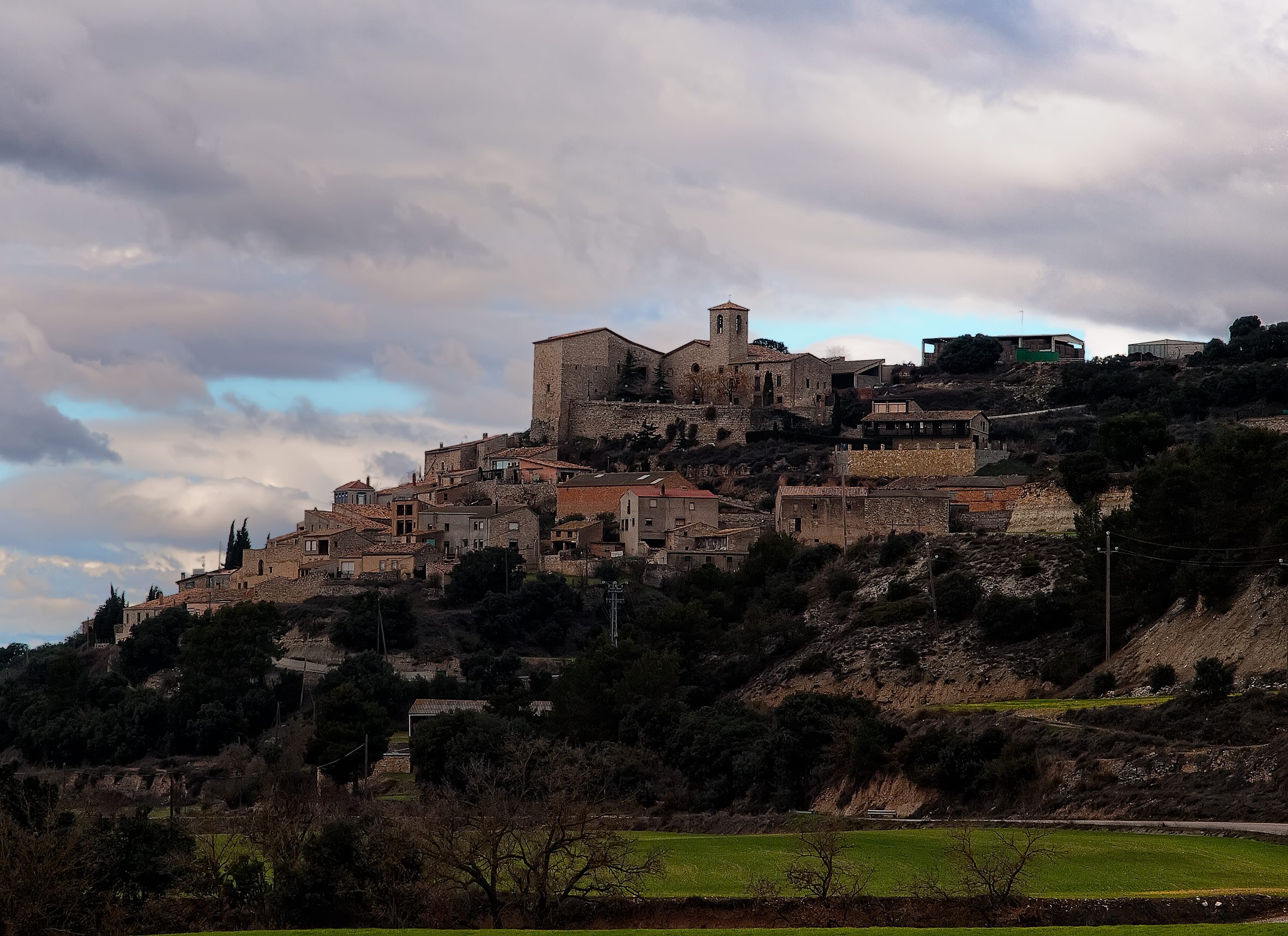

- Coat of arms

- Location in Catalonia
- Coordinates: 41°41′38″N 1°22′46″E
- Country: Spain
- Community: Catalonia
- Province: Lleida
- Comarca: Segarra

Government
  - Mayor: Ramon Torné Goma (2015)

Area
  - Total: 21.0 km^{2} (8.1 sq mi)

Population (2025-01-01)
  - Total: 161
  - Density: 7.67/km^{2} (19.9/sq mi)
- Website: estaras.ddl.net

Estaràs (Catalan pronunciation: [estaˈɾas]) is a village in the province of Lleida and autonomous community of Catalonia, Spain.

It has a population of 161 (register office, 2025).
