= Sant Guim de Freixenet =

- Municipality
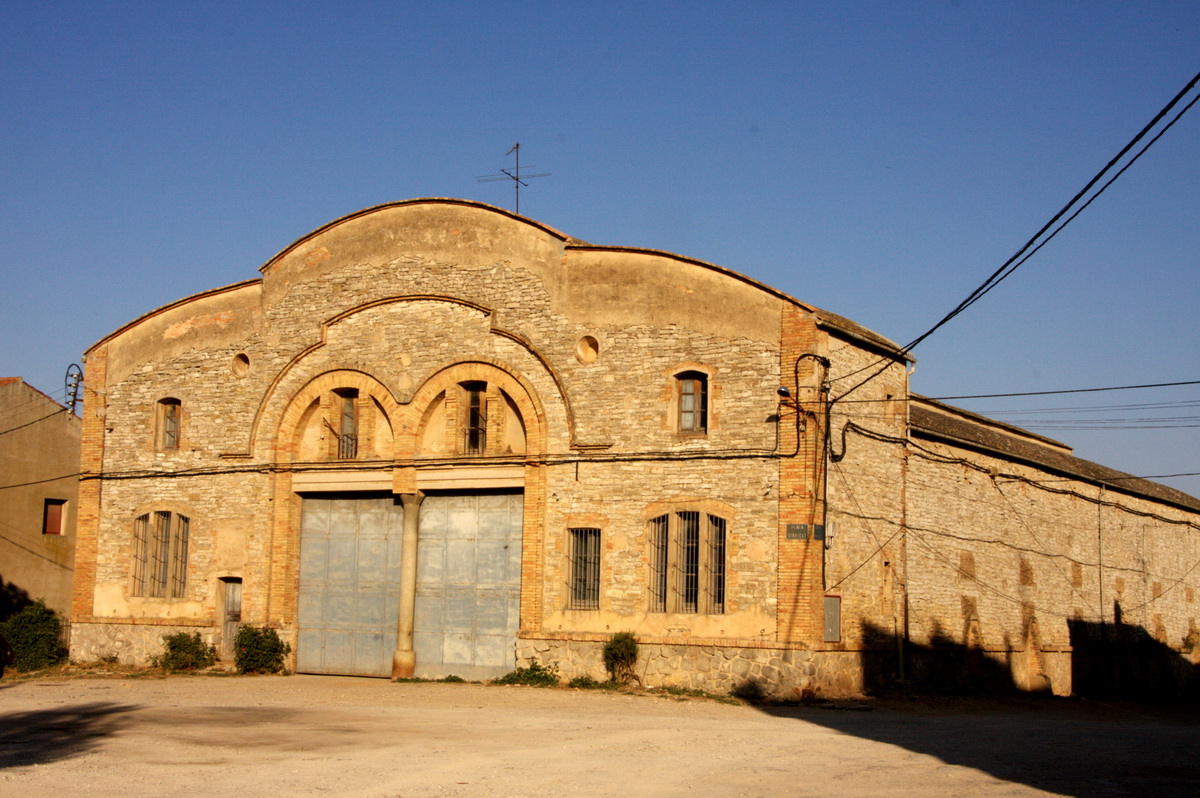
- Sant Guim agricultural co-op

- Flag Coat of arms

- Location in Catalonia
- Coordinates: 41°39′27″N 1°25′19″E
- Country: Spain
- Community: Catalonia
- Province: Lleida
- Comarca: Segarra

Government
  - mayor: Francesc Lluch Majoral (2015)

Area
  - Total: 25.1 km^{2} (9.7 sq mi)
- Elevation: 738 m (2,421 ft)

Population (2025-01-01)
  - Total: 1,235
  - Density: 49.2/km^{2} (127/sq mi)
- Postal code: 25192
- Website: www.santguim.cat

Sant Guim de Freixenet (Catalan pronunciation: [ˈsaŋ ˈgim de fɾejʃeˈnet]) is a municipality in the comarca of la Segarra in Catalonia, Spain.

It has a population of 1,235 (register office, 2025).

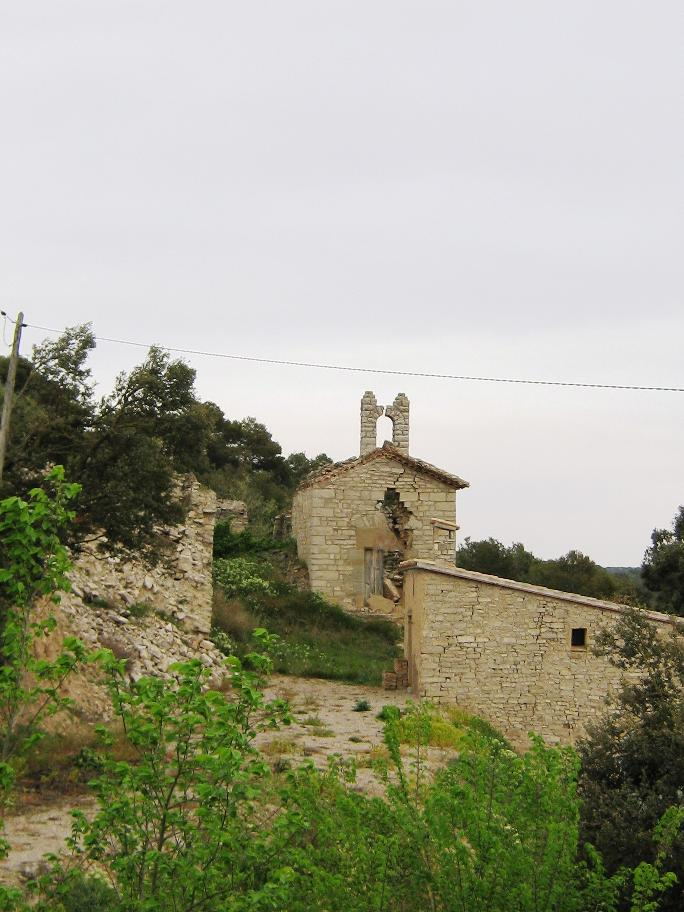
The deserted village of Palamós with the now ruined Sant Joan de Palamós church

== History ==
Owing to the intense military activity at the Lleida front, this municipality suffered much during the Spanish Civil War (1936–1939).

At that time it was known as Pineda de Segarra and, owing to the hardships caused by the war, paper money was printed in the town. The present-day main town was formerly known as Sant Guim de l'Estació because it was built around the railway station of the Lleida - Manresa line.

Nowadays many of the villages that make up the municipality have been depopulated as people have moved to urban areas. Most have only residual population.

== Villages ==
- Altadill, 0
- Amorós, 10
- El Castell de Santa Maria, 12
- Freixenet de Segarra, 44
- Melió, 6
- Palamós 0
- La Rabassa, 26
- Sant Domí, 21
- Sant Guim de Freixenet, 868
- Sant Guim de la Rabassa, 22
- La Tallada, 48
