= Massoteres =

- Municipality
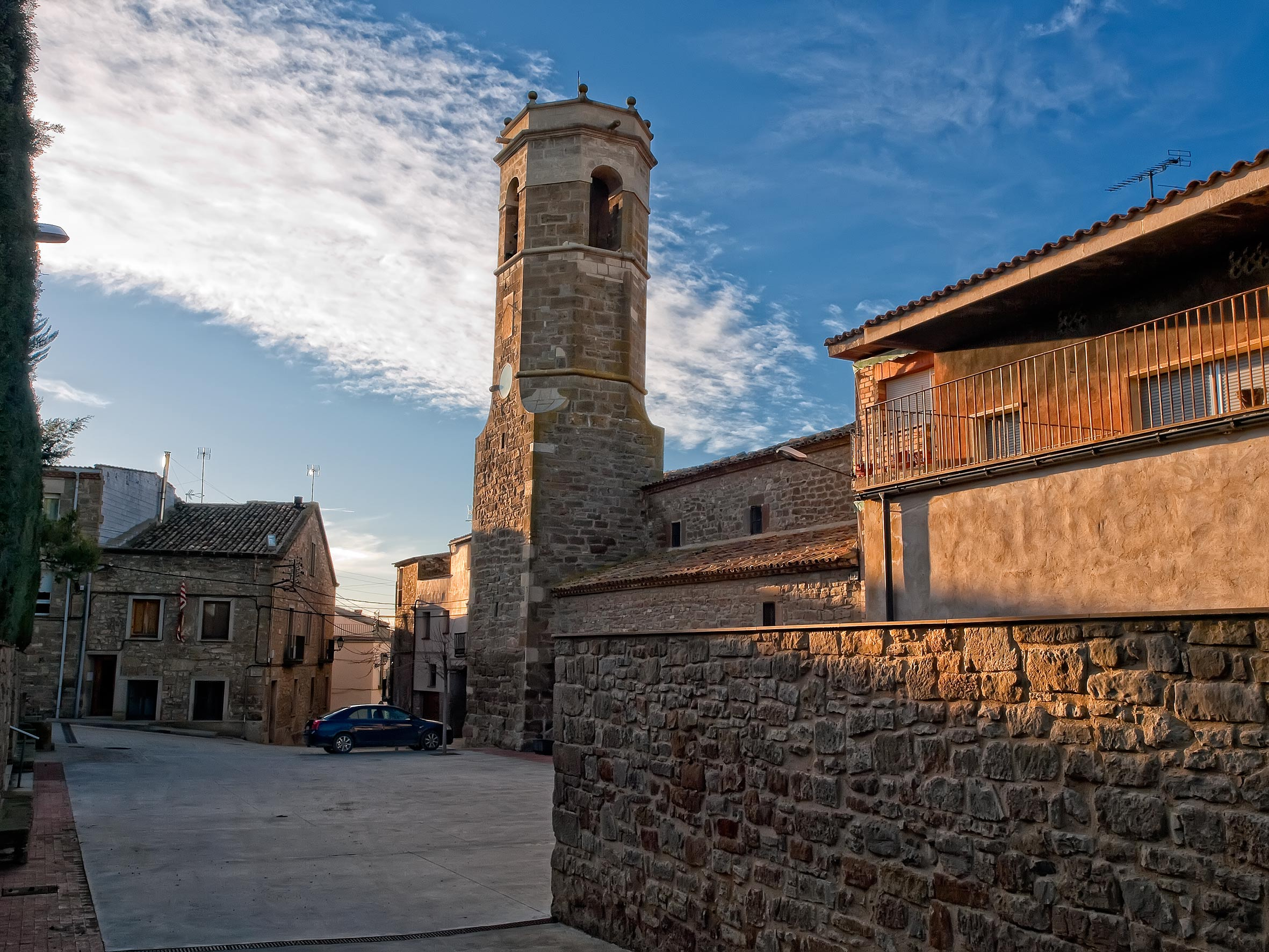
- Holy Saviour parish church

- Coat of arms

- Location in Catalonia
- Coordinates: 41°47′57″N 1°18′43″E
- Country: Spain
- Community: Catalonia
- Province: Lleida
- Comarca: Segarra

Government
  - Mayor: Miquel Àngel Marina Fontanellas (2015)

Area
  - Total: 26.1 km^{2} (10.1 sq mi)

Population (2025-01-01)
  - Total: 227
  - Density: 8.70/km^{2} (22.5/sq mi)
- Website: massoteres.cat

Massoteres (Catalan pronunciation: [masoˈteɾes]) is a municipality in the province of Lleida and autonomous community of Catalonia, Spain.

It has a population of 227 (register office, 2025).
