= Els Plans de Sió =

- Municipality
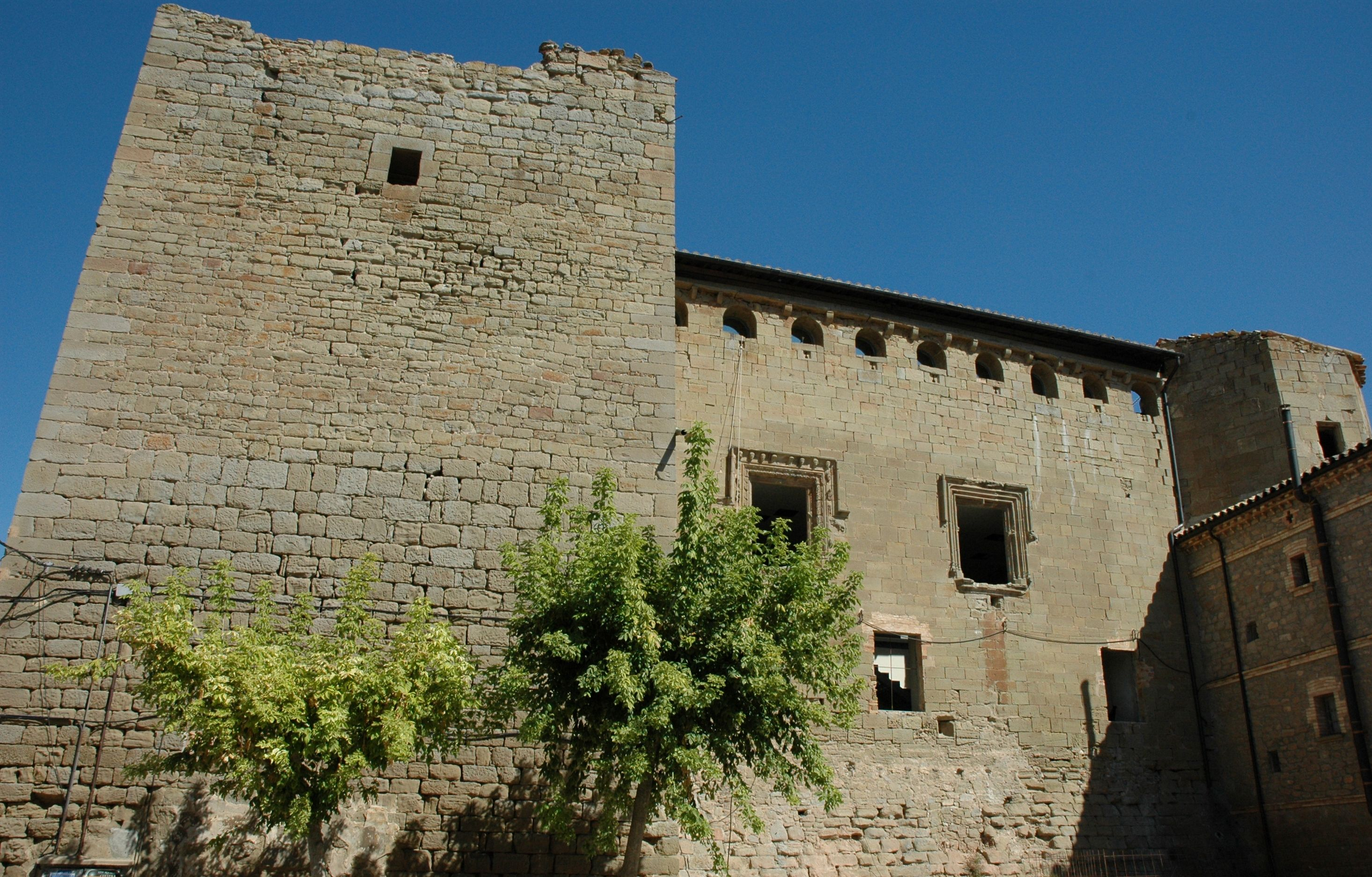
- Concabella Castle

- Coat of arms

- Location in Catalonia
- Coordinates: 41°45′50″N 1°11′55″E
- Country: Spain
- Community: Catalonia
- Province: Lleida
- Comarca: Segarra

Government
  - Mayor: Xavier Pintó Serra (2015)

Area
  - Total: 55.9 km^{2} (21.6 sq mi)

Population (2025-01-01)
  - Total: 506
  - Density: 9.05/km^{2} (23.4/sq mi)
- Website: planssio.ddl.net

Els Plans de Sió (Catalan pronunciation: [els ˈplanz ðe siˈo]) is a municipality in the province of Lleida and autonomous community of Catalonia, Spain.

It has a population of 506 (register office, 2025).
