= El Castell de Santa Maria =

- Locality
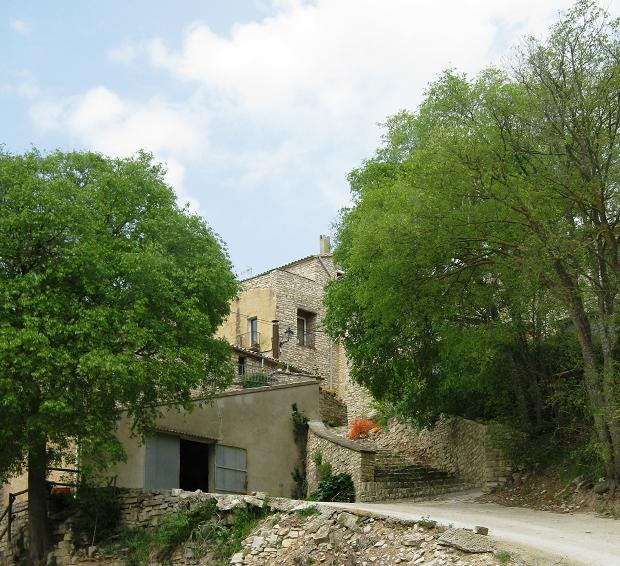

- Location within Province of Lleida Location within Catalonia Location within Spain
- Coordinates: 41°40′51″N 1°24′18″E
- Country: Spain
- Community: Catalonia
- Province: Lleida
- Municipality: Sant Guim de Freixenet
- Elevation: 655 m (2,149 ft)

Population
  - Total: 13

El Castell de Santa Maria is a locality located in the municipality of Sant Guim de Freixenet, in Province of Lleida province, Catalonia, Spain. As of 2020, it has a population of 13.

== Geography ==
El Castell de Santa Maria is located 79km east of Lleida.
