= Altadill =

- Locality
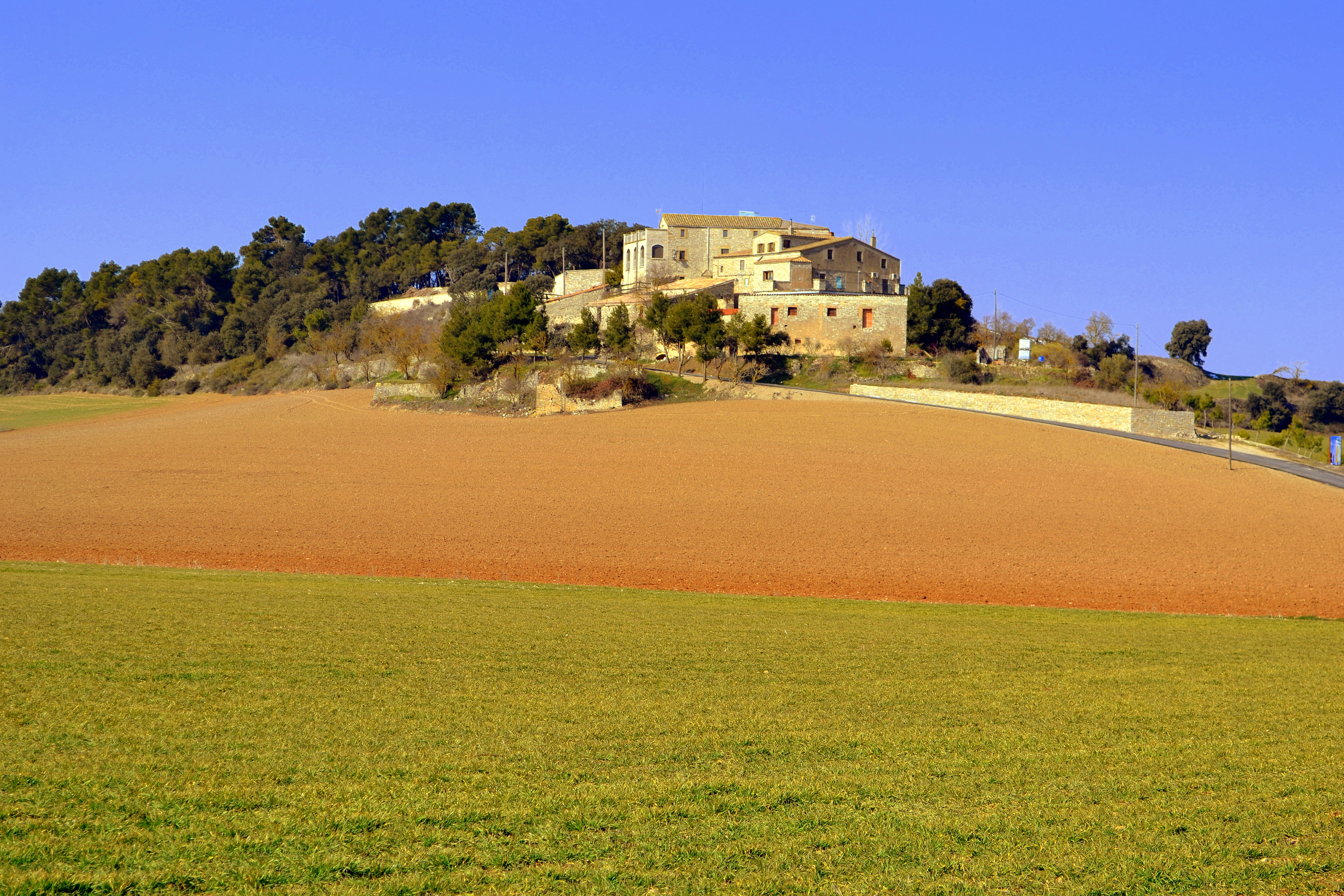

- Location within Province of Lleida Location within Catalonia Location within Spain
- Coordinates: 41°40′13″N 1°23′20″E
- Country: Spain
- Community: Catalonia
- Province: Lleida
- Municipality: Sant Guim de Freixenet
- Elevation: 682 m (2,238 ft)

Population
  - Total: 1

Altadill is a locality located in the municipality of Sant Guim de Freixenet, in Province of Lleida province, Catalonia, Spain. As of 2023, it has a population of 1.

== Geography ==
Altadill is located 82km east of Lleida.
