= La Rabassa =

- Locality
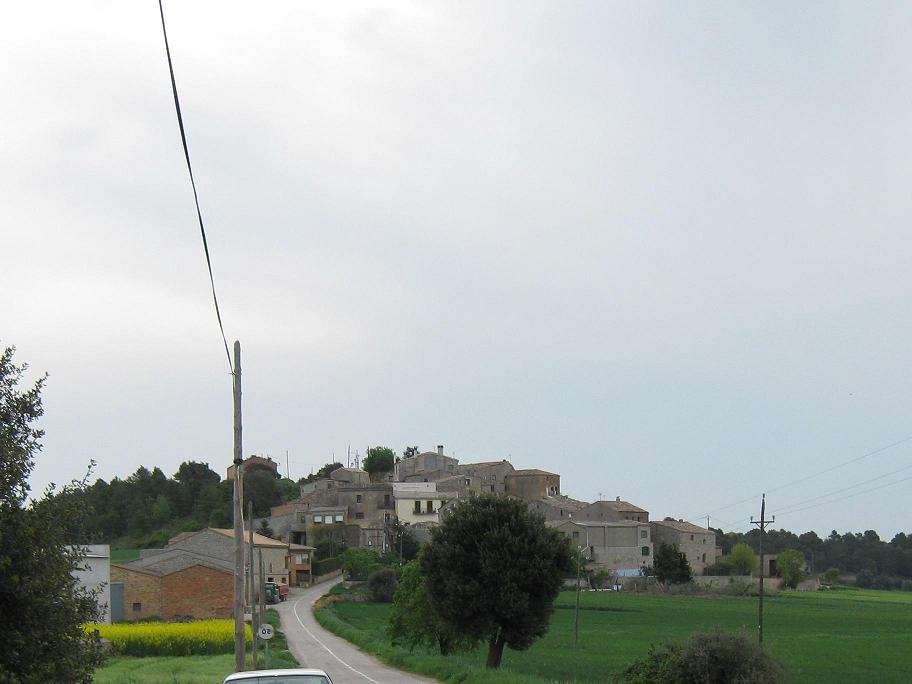

- Location within Province of Lleida Location within Catalonia Location within Spain
- Coordinates: 41°38′51″N 1°22′57″E
- Country: Spain
- Community: Catalonia
- Province: Lleida
- Municipality: Sant Guim de Freixenet
- Elevation: 695 m (2,280 ft)

Population
  - Total: 15

La Rabassa is a locality located in the municipality of Sant Guim de Freixenet, in Province of Lleida province, Catalonia, Spain. As of 2020, it has a population of 15.

== Geography ==
La Rabassa is located 87km east of Lleida.
