= Carmen Balcells =

World-renowned Spanish literary agent

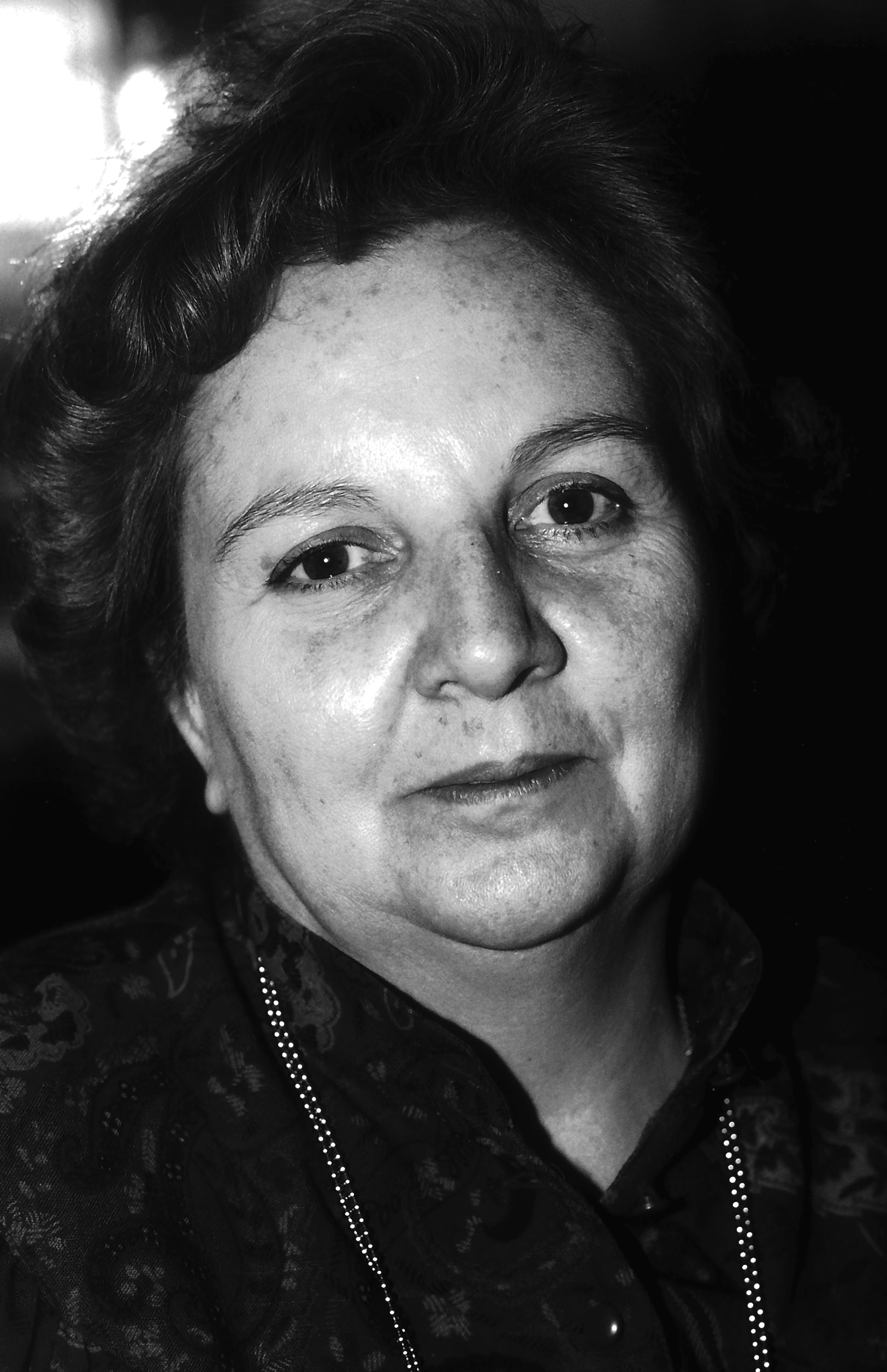
Carmen Balcells in 1983

Carmen Balcells Segala (9 August 1930 – 20 September 2015) was a literary agent of Spanish-language authors from Spain and Latin America, including six Nobel Prize–winning authors. She led her agency from 1956 to 2000, during which time she was one of the driving forces behind the 1960s boom of Latin American literature.

After her retirement she was awarded with an honorary doctorate, besides other awards, but returned to the agency in 2008. Authors who have published with Balcells have dedicated novels to her and included her as characters in their work; She is praised as "one of the most powerful and influential women in Spanish letters." She died at the age of 85 in Barcelona on 20 September 2015. At her death Mario Vargas Llosa said: "Carmen queridísima, hasta pronto" ("Carmen dearest, see you soon").

== Career ==
In 1955 the Spanish poet Jaume Ferran put her in contact with leading writers of the 1950s, such as the Ferrater brothers, Jaime Gil de Biedma, Carlos Barral, Juan Goytisolo, and Josep Maria Castellet. She then began working as a correspondent in Barcelona and doing part-time work at the ACER literary agency, owned by the Romanian writer Vintilă Horia. Later Horia moved to Paris, which led her to found the Carmen Balcells Literary Agency in 1956. The agency started with the management of translation rights to foreign authors. Later, the first local author she represented was Luis Goytisolo. Several prominent authors were represented by agency established by Carmen such as Pablo Neruda, Gabriel García Márquez, Mario Vargas Llosa, Julio Cortázar, Clarice Lispector, Nélida Piñon, Miguel Delibes, Alvaro Mutis, Camilo José Cela, Vicente Aleixandre, Gonzalo Torrente Ballester, Manuel Vázquez Montalbán, Jose Luis Sampedro, Terenci Moix, Juan Carlos Onetti, Jaime Gil de Biedma, Carlos Barral, Josep Maria Castellet, Juan Goytisolo, Alfredo Bryce Echenique, Juan Marsé, Eduardo Mendoza, Isabel Allende and Rosa Montero, among others.

Some authors, such as García Márquez, Marsé, Onetti, Tosar and Dourado, have dedicated novels to her; others, such as Max Aub, Vázquez Montalbán, José Donoso and Barral have included her as a character in their works.

Balcells considered her great accomplishment to be revising the contracts between authors and publishers to be more fair to authors. She established time limits on contracts and reserved the rights of translations for the authors.

One day, by phone, García Márquez asked, "Do you love me, Carmen?" She replied, "I can not answer, you are one third of my revenue."

With almost forty years of work under her belt, Balcells announced in May 2000 that she was retiring as a literary agent. She had received the Gold Medal of Fine Arts and was presented with an honorary doctorate from the Universitat Autònoma de Barcelona (UAB). Her literary agency became headed by Gloria Gutierrez. However, in 2008 she returned again to take charge of the agency since it lost important writers such as Guillermo Cabrera Infante and Roberto Bolaño, who left to be with the agency of Andrew Wylie, known in the publishing industry as "el Chacal"; also the loss of authors such as Luisge Martin and Daniel Vázquez Salles.

In 2010 the Spanish Ministry of Culture bought approximately fifty years of her personal archives for three million euros.

In May 2014 Balcells announced she will join with Andrew Wylie to become the Balcells-Wylie agency.

== Personal life ==
Eldest of four children, she was born on 9 August 1930 into a family of small landowners in Santa Fe de Segarra, Les Oluges, Lleida, Catalonia, Spain, a small town of only fifty people. She attended primary school in her hometown. In 1946, she moved with her family to Barcelona, where she did various jobs not related to literature.

In 1961 she married Luis Palomares, with whom three years later she had her only son, Luis Miguel Palomares Balcells, who is, since 2016, the owner and director of the agency.

== Awards and recognition ==
As the most famous literary agent in the world of Spanish letters she has received numerous awards, among them the following:

- 1997 – Medal of Honor in Barcelona.
- 2000 – Medal for Artistic Merit, awarded by the City Council of Barcelona.
- 2005 – Doctor Honoris Causa from the Autonomous University of Barcelona.
- 2006 – the Cross of Saint George.
- 2006 – Montblanc Award for Women.

She was on the Advisory Council of the Prince of Girona Foundation.

== Bibliography ==
- "Famed Spanish Literary Agent Carmen Balcells Dead at 85". Associated Press / ABC News. 21 September 2015.
- Ayén, Xavi (29 July 2006). "Balcells, la dueña del boom" (in Spanish). Clarin.com. Archived from the original on 10 November 2010.
- Constenla, Tereixa (17 November 2011). "Los secretos de la Mamá Grande". El País (in Spanish).
- "Carmen Balcells recibirá la medalla al mérito artístico". El País (in Spanish). 12 October 2000.
- "Muere Carmen Balcells, la gran agente literaria en español" (in Spanish). El País. 21 September 2015.
- Goldman, Francisco (2001). "Alvaro Mutis". Bomb Magazine. Archived from the original on 14 September 2012.
- Hax, Andres (23 November 2011). "Inside the Archive of Literary Agent Carmen 'Mama Grande' Balcells". Publishing Perspectives.
- Lucas, Antonio (10 June 2008). "Carmen Balcells: 'He pensado vender la agencia, ¿pero a quién?'" (in Spanish). El Mundo.
- "Mrs. Carmen Balcells Segala". Prince of Girona Foundation.
- "UAB Doctorate". Autonomous University of Barcelona. 20 December 2005. Archived from the original on 15 February 2012.
- Vargas Llosa, Mario (20 August 2000). "El jubileo de Carmen Balcells". El País (in Spanish).
- Donadio, Rachel (19 June 2014). "After Years of Solitude, Spanish Literary Champion Takes Partner". NY Times.
- Donadio, Rachel (5 October 2015). "A Literary Agency's Future Is Uncertain After Its Founder's Death". NY Times.

=== See also ===
Agencia Literaria Carmen Balcells
