= Sant Guim de la Rabassa =

- Locality
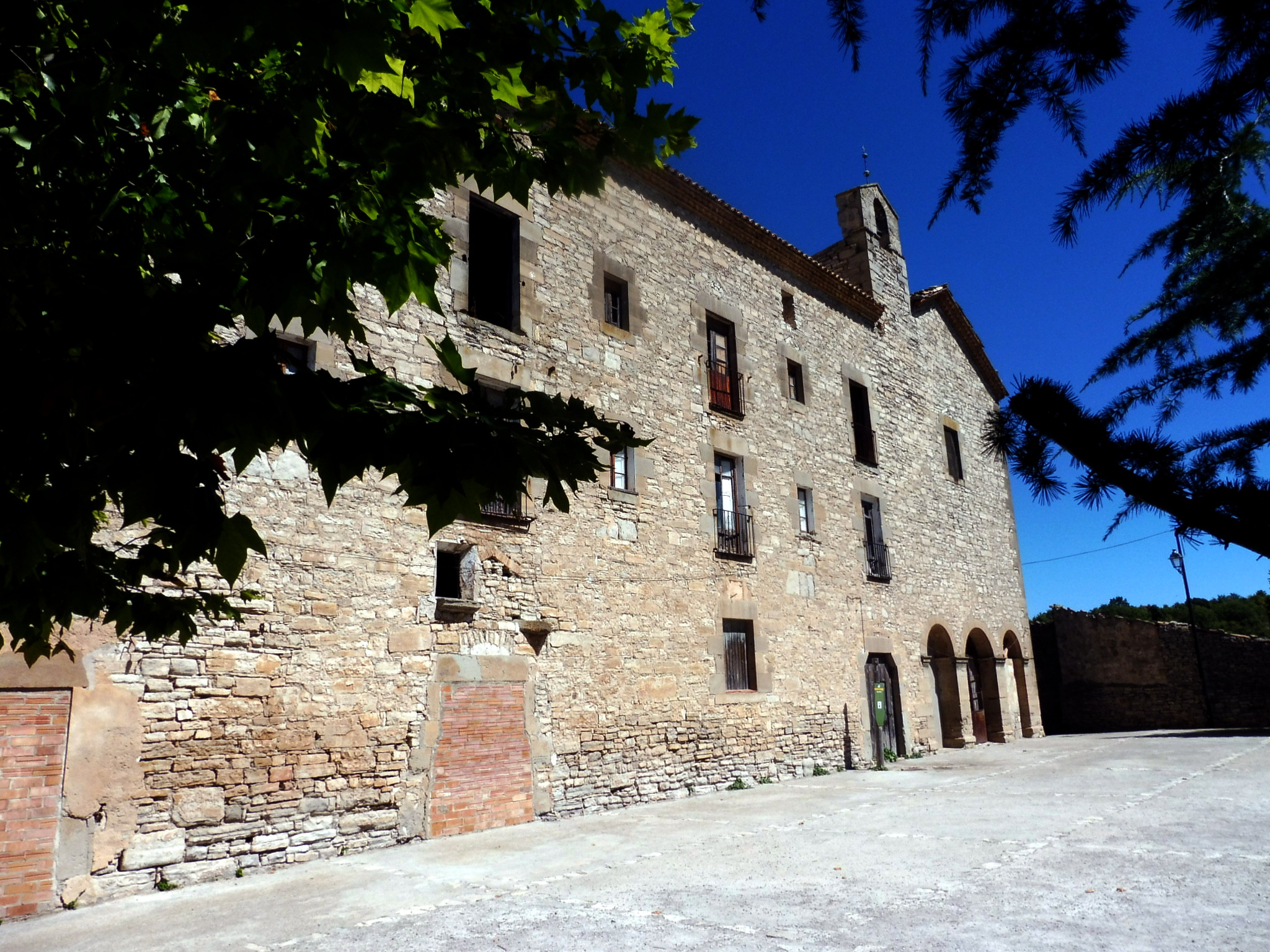

- Location within Province of Lleida Location within Catalonia Location within Spain
- Coordinates: 41°38′49″N 1°24′16″E
- Country: Spain
- Community: Catalonia
- Province: Lleida
- Municipality: Sant Guim de Freixenet
- Elevation: 724 m (2,375 ft)

Population
  - Total: 16

Sant Guim de la Rabassa is a hamlet located in the municipality of Sant Guim de Freixenet, in Province of Lleida province, Catalonia, Spain. As of 2020, it has a population of 16.

== Geography ==
Sant Guim de la Rabassa is located 85km east of Lleida.
