= Ivorra =

- Municipality
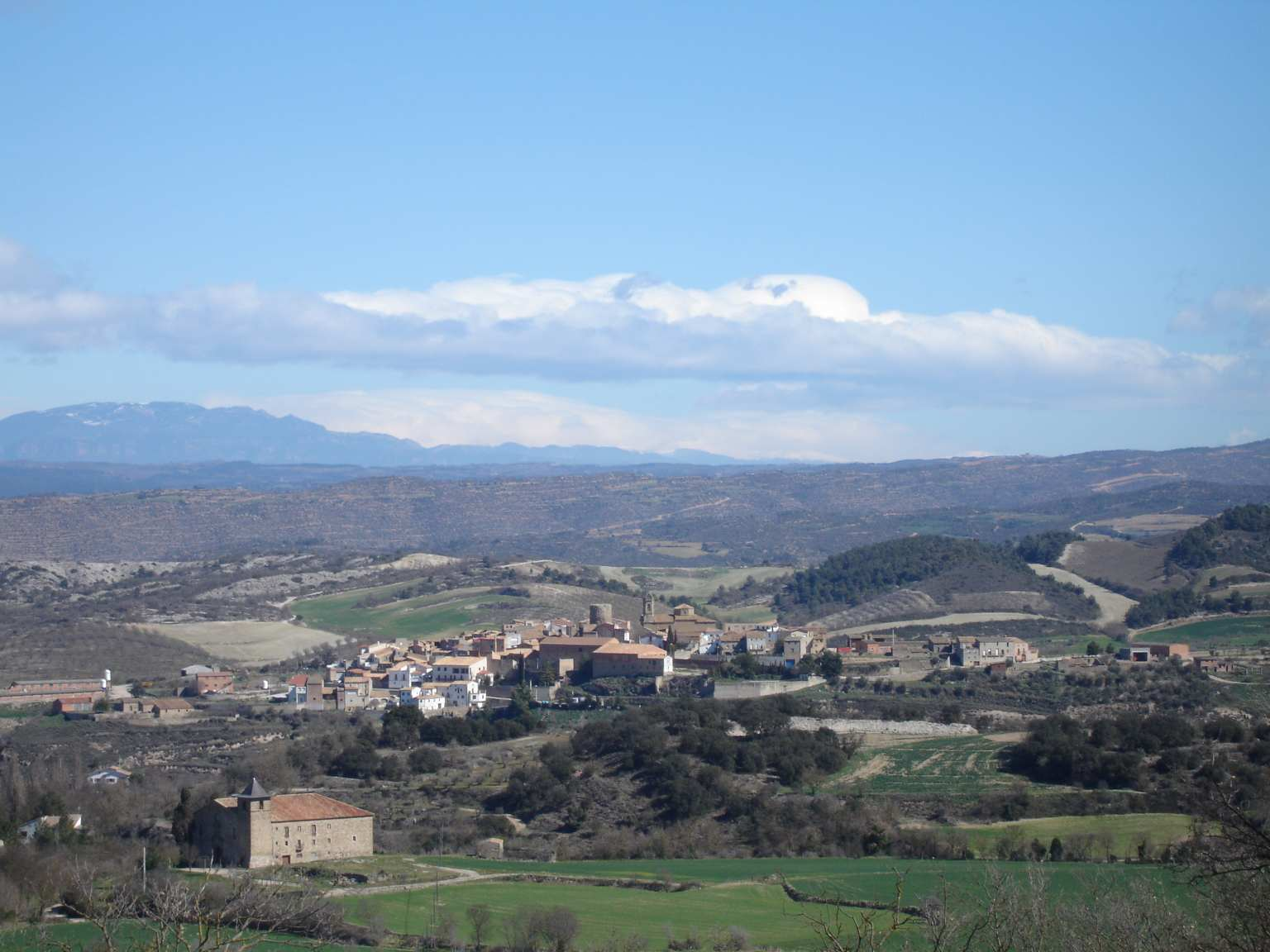

- Coat of arms

- Location in Catalonia
- Coordinates: 41.773°N 1.397°E
- Country: Spain
- Community: Catalonia
- Province: Lleida
- Comarca: Segarra

Government
  - Mayor: Jordi Ribalta Sala (2015)

Area
  - Total: 15.4 km^{2} (5.9 sq mi)

Population (2025-01-01)
  - Total: 100
  - Density: 6.5/km^{2} (17/sq mi)
- Website: ivorra.ddl.net

Ivorra (Catalan pronunciation: [iˈβora]) is a village in the province of Lleida and autonomous community of Catalonia, Spain.

It has a population of 100 (register office, 2025).
