= Les Oluges =

- Municipality
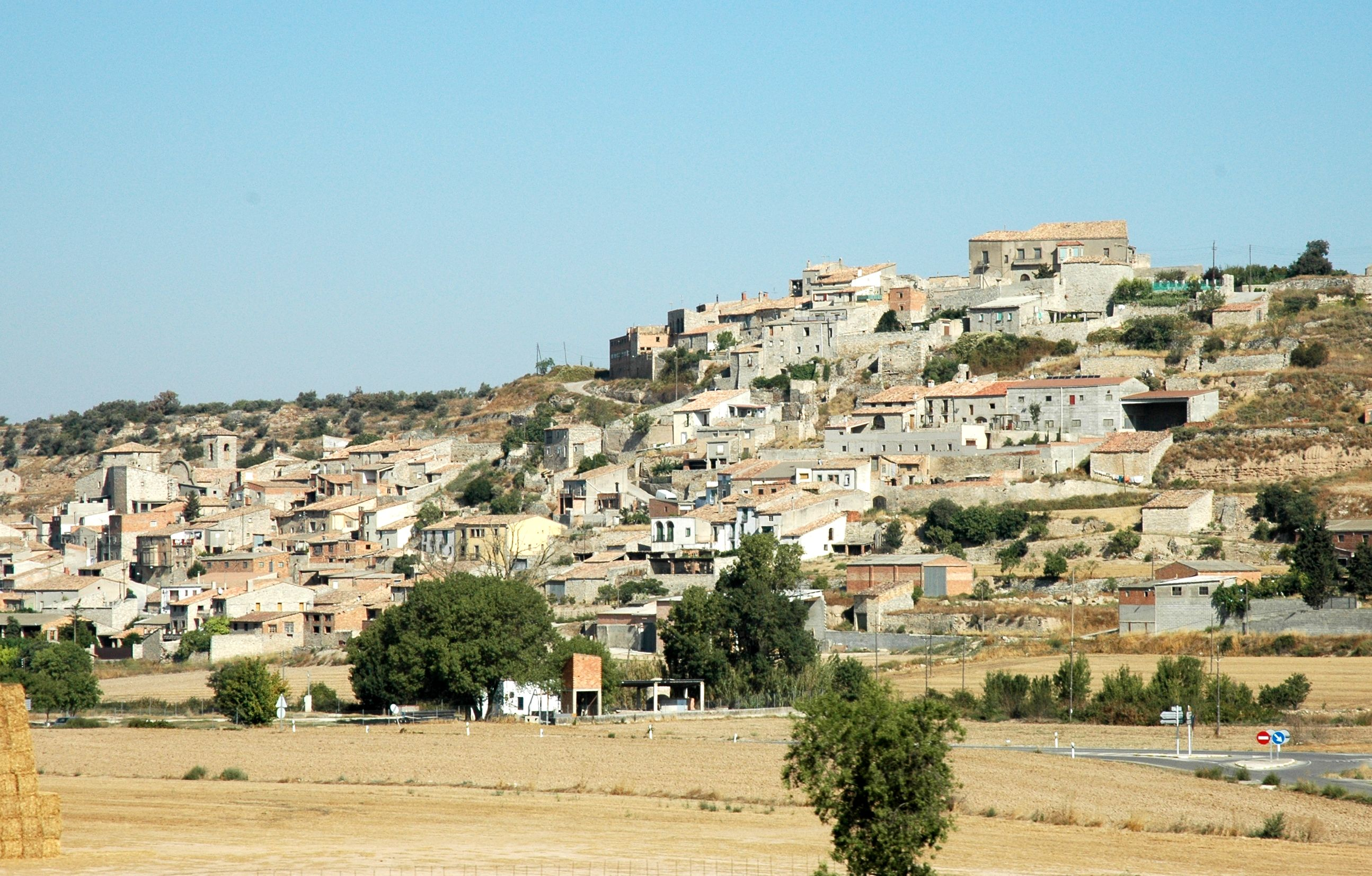
- Les Oluges

- Coat of arms

- Location in Catalonia
- Coordinates: 41°41′57″N 1°19′18″E
- Country: Spain
- Community: Catalonia
- Province: Lleida
- Comarca: Segarra

Government
  - Mayor: José Maria Caldero Bosch (2015)

Area
  - Total: 19.0 km^{2} (7.3 sq mi)

Population (2025-01-01)
  - Total: 167
  - Density: 8.79/km^{2} (22.8/sq mi)
- Website: oluges.ddl.net

Les Oluges (Catalan pronunciation: [lez oˈluʒes]) is a village in the comarca of Segarra, in the province of Lleida and autonomous community of Catalonia, Spain.

It has a population of 167 (register office, 2025).

== Notable people ==
- Carmen Balcells, literary agent of many famous Spanish-language writers (from Santa Fe Les Oluges)
