= Sant Guim de la Plana =

- Municipality
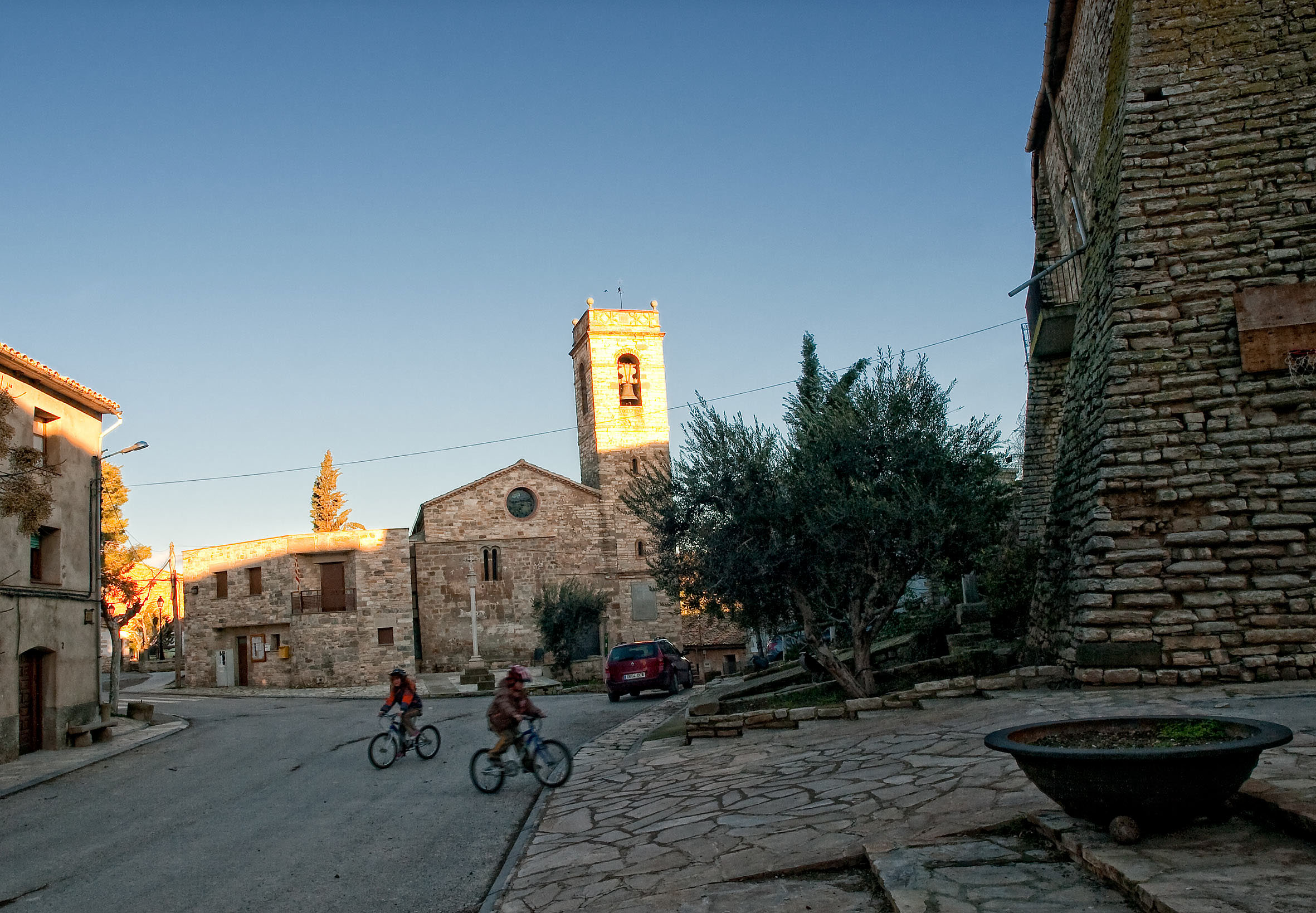
- Sant Guim church

- Flag Coat of arms

- Location in Catalonia
- Coordinates: 41°46′N 1°19′E
- Country: Spain
- Community: Catalonia
- Province: Lleida
- Comarca: Segarra

Government
  - Mayor: Josep Llobet Condal (2015)

Area
  - Total: 12.4 km^{2} (4.8 sq mi)

Population (2025-01-01)
  - Total: 190
  - Density: 15/km^{2} (40/sq mi)
- Website: santguimplana.ddl.net

Sant Guim de la Plana (Catalan pronunciation: [ˈsaŋ ˈgim de la ˈplana]) is a village in the province of Lleida and autonomous community of Catalonia, Spain.

It has a population of 190 (register office, 2025).
