= Palamós, Segarra =

Palamós
- Locality
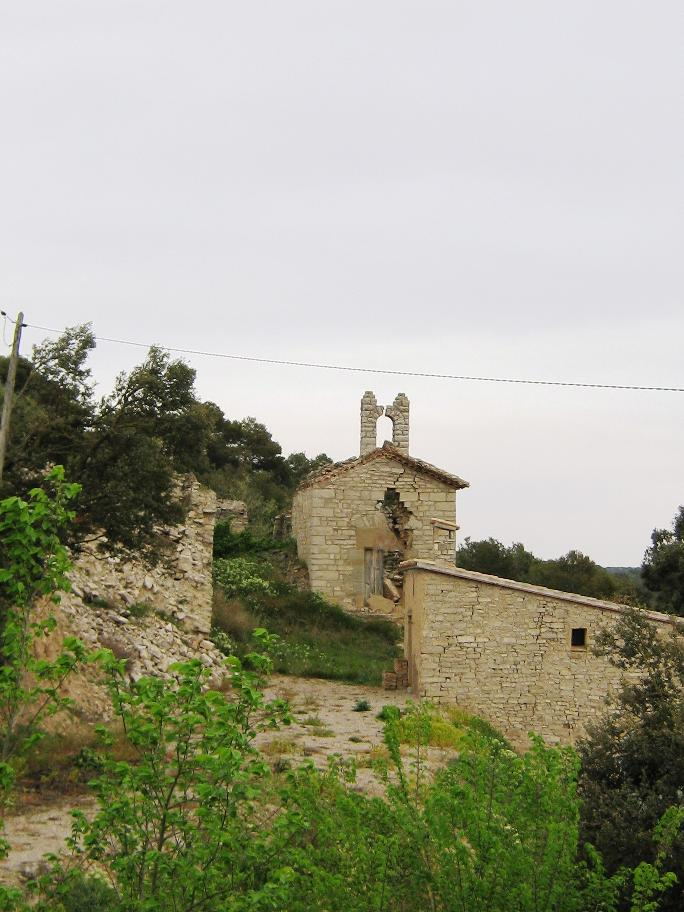

- Location within Province of Lleida Location within Catalonia Location within Spain
- Coordinates: 41°38′25″N 1°22′45″E
- Country: Spain
- Community: Catalonia
- Province: Lleida
- Municipality: Sant Guim de Freixenet
- Elevation: 645 m (2,116 ft)

Population
  - Total: 4

Palamós is a locality located in the municipality of Sant Guim de Freixenet, in Province of Lleida province, Catalonia, Spain. As of 2020, it has a population of 4.

== Geography ==
Palamós is located 80km east of Lleida.
