= Granyanella =

- Municipality
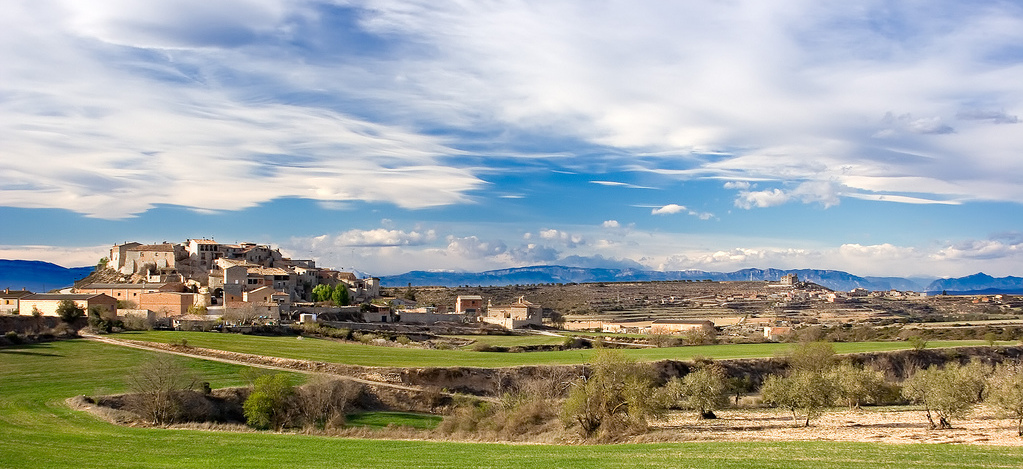

- Coat of arms

- Location in Catalonia
- Coordinates: 41.649°N 1.224°E
- Country: Spain
- Community: Catalonia
- Province: Lleida
- Comarca: Segarra

Government
  - Mayor: Ramon Pinto Rosich (2015)

Area
  - Total: 24.4 km^{2} (9.4 sq mi)

Population (2025-01-01)
  - Total: 154
  - Density: 6.31/km^{2} (16.3/sq mi)
- Climate: Cfb
- Website: granyanella.ddl.net

Granyanella (Catalan pronunciation: [gɾaɲaˈneʎa]) is a village in the province of Lleida and autonomous community of Catalonia, Spain.

It has a population of 154 (register office, 2025).
