= Talavera, Spain =

Talavera
- Municipality
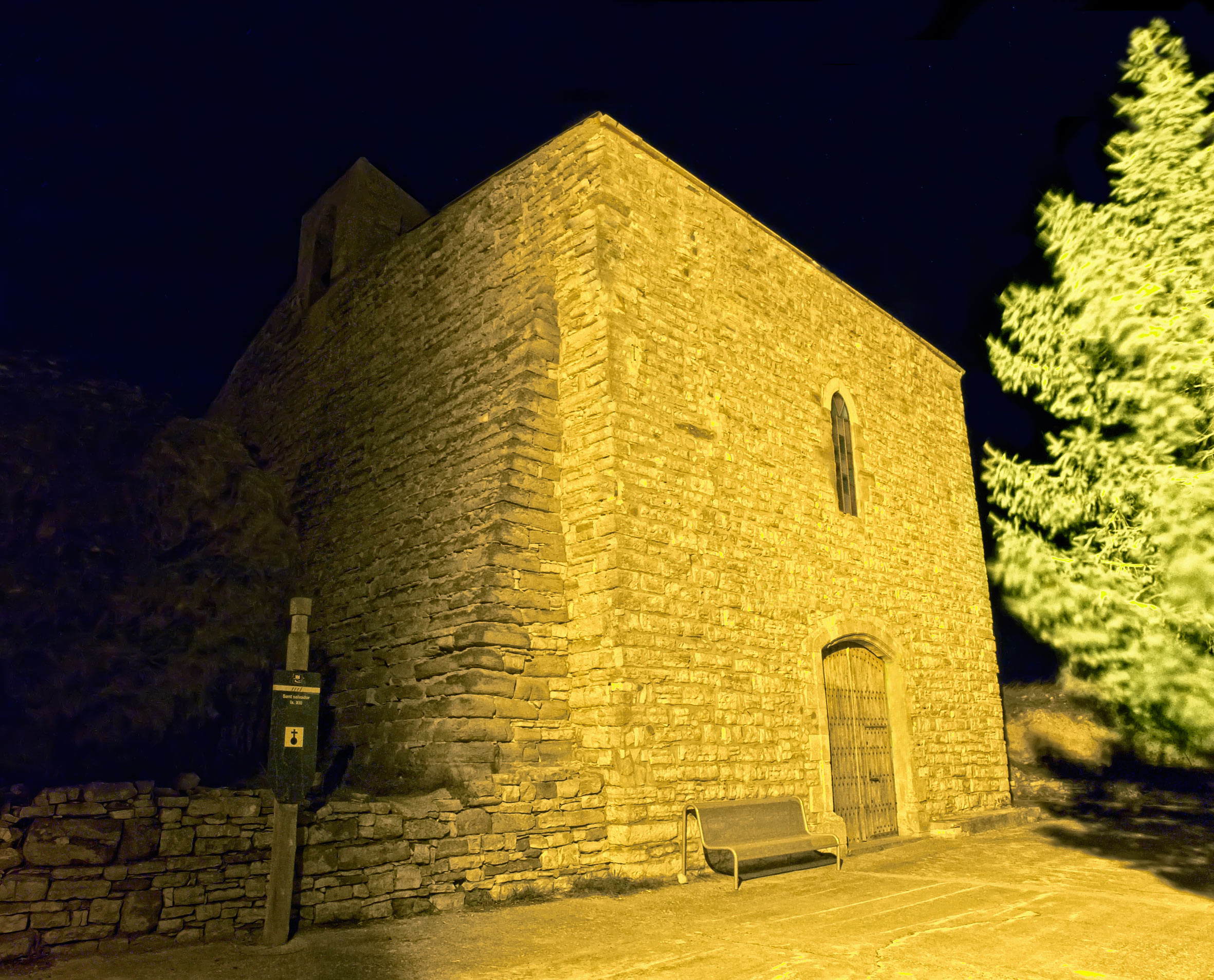
- Holy Saviour church

- Location in Catalonia
- Coordinates: 41°35′03″N 1°20′21″E
- Country: Spain
- Community: Catalonia
- Province: Lleida
- Comarca: Segarra

Government
  - Mayor: Ramon Trullols Bergadà (2015)

Area
  - Total: 30.1 km^{2} (11.6 sq mi)
- Elevation: 791 m (2,595 ft)

Population (2025-01-01)
  - Total: 280
  - Density: 9.3/km^{2} (24/sq mi)
- Postal code: 25213
- Website: talavera.ddl.net

Talavera (Catalan pronunciation: [talaˈβeɾa]) is a municipality of the comarca of the Segarra in the province of Lleida, Catalonia, Spain.

It has a population of 280 (register office, 2025).
