= Sant Domí =

- Locality
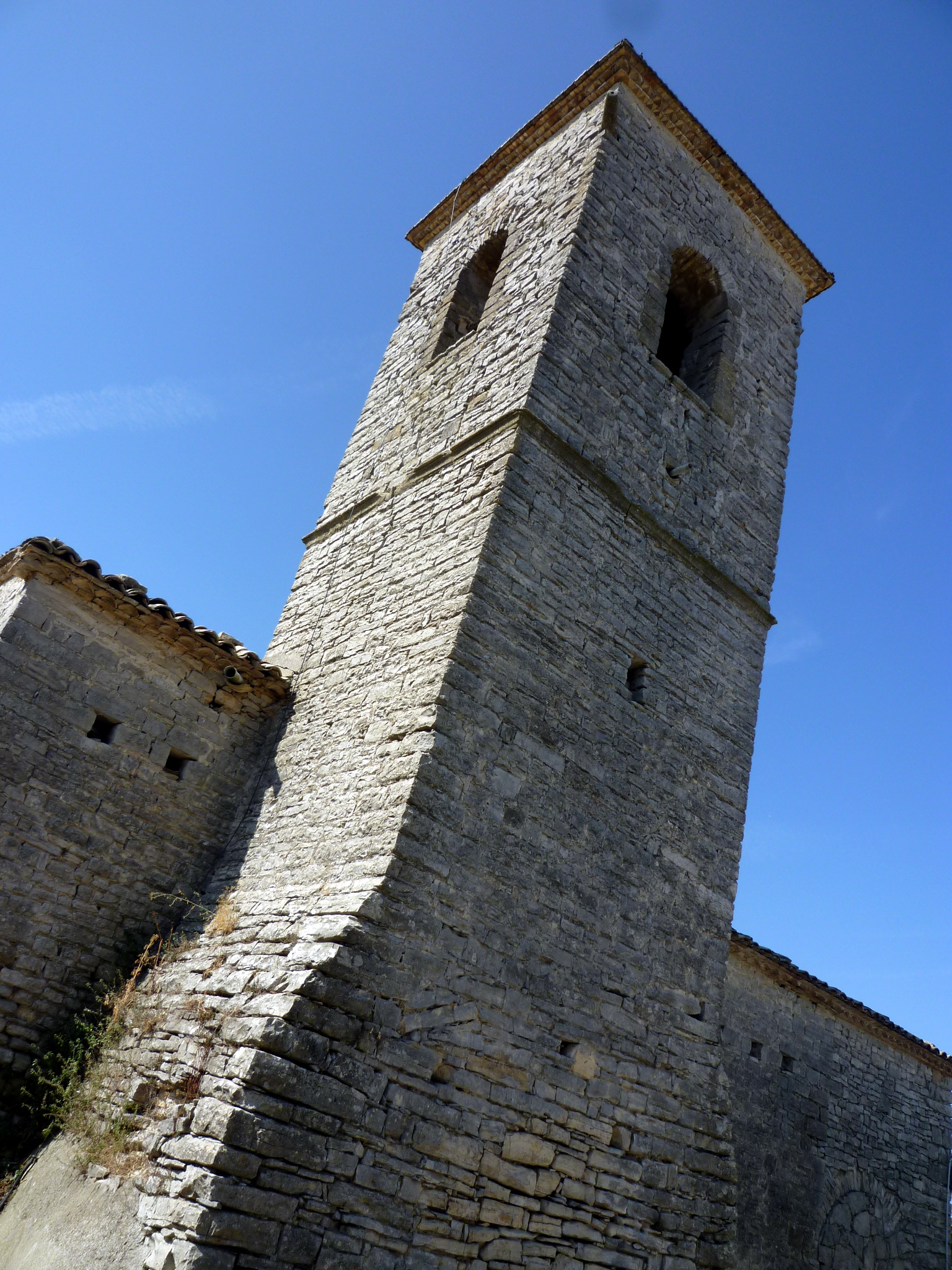

- Location within Province of Lleida Location within Catalonia Location within Spain
- Coordinates: 41°39′55″N 1°24′50″E
- Country: Spain
- Community: Catalonia
- Province: Lleida
- Municipality: Sant Guim de Freixenet
- Elevation: 693 m (2,274 ft)

Population
  - Total: 27

Sant Domí is a hamlet located in the municipality of Sant Guim de Freixenet, in Province of Lleida province, Catalonia, Spain. As of 2020, it has a population of 27.

== Geography ==
Sant Domí is located 81km east of Lleida.
