= Segarra =

Coordinates: 41°44′21″N 1°19′55″E

- Comarca
- Flag Coat of arms

- Country: Spain
- Autonomous community: Catalonia
- Region: Ponent
- Province: Lleida
- Capital: Cervera
- Municipalities: List: Biosca, Cervera, Estaràs, Granyanella, Granyena de Segarra, Guissona, Ivorra, Massoteres, Montoliu de Segarra, Montornès de Segarra, Les Oluges, Els Plans de Sió, Ribera d'Ondara, Sanaüja, Sant Guim de Freixenet, Sant Guim de la Plana, Sant Ramon, Talavera, Tarroja de Segarra, Torà, Torrefeta i Florejacs

Government
  - Body: Segarra Comarcal Council
  - President: Ramon Augé (Junts)

Area
  - Total: 722.8 km^{2} (279.1 sq mi)

Population (2014)
  - Total: 22,713
  - Density: 31.42/km^{2} (81.39/sq mi)
- Demonym
- Time zone: UTC+1 (CET)
  - Summer (DST): UTC+2 (CEST)
- Largest municipality: Cervera
- Website: www.ccsegarra.cat

Segarra (Western Catalan: [seˈɣara, seˈɣarɛ]) is a comarca (county) in Ponent, Catalonia (Spain), situated on a high plain. Historically, the name referred to a larger area than the current comarca. It has a continental climate, with cold winters and hot summers, and between 350 and 450 mm (15-18 inches) of rainfall per year. It is a grain-growing region, with some pine woods and a few evergreen oaks.

Its capital is the town of Cervera.

== Municipalities ==
Municipality	Population (2014)	Area km^{2}
Biosca	197	66.2
Cervera	9,039	55.2
Estaràs	176	21.0
Granyanella	147	24.4
Granyena de Segarra	136	16.3
Guissona	6,827	18.1
Ivorra	115	15.4
Massoteres	196	26.1
Montoliu de Segarra	193	29.5
Montornès de Segarra	105	12.3
Les Oluges	158	19.0
Els Plans de Sió	560	55.9
Ribera d'Ondara	420	54.5
Sanaüja	423	33.0
Sant Guim de Freixenet	1,107	25.1
Sant Guim de la Plana	175	12.4
Sant Ramon	496	18.5
Talavera	267	30.1
Tarroja de Segarra	173	7.6
Torà	1,202	93.3
Torrefeta i Florejacs	601	88.9
• Total: 21	22,713	722.8
