= Montornès de Segarra =

- Municipality
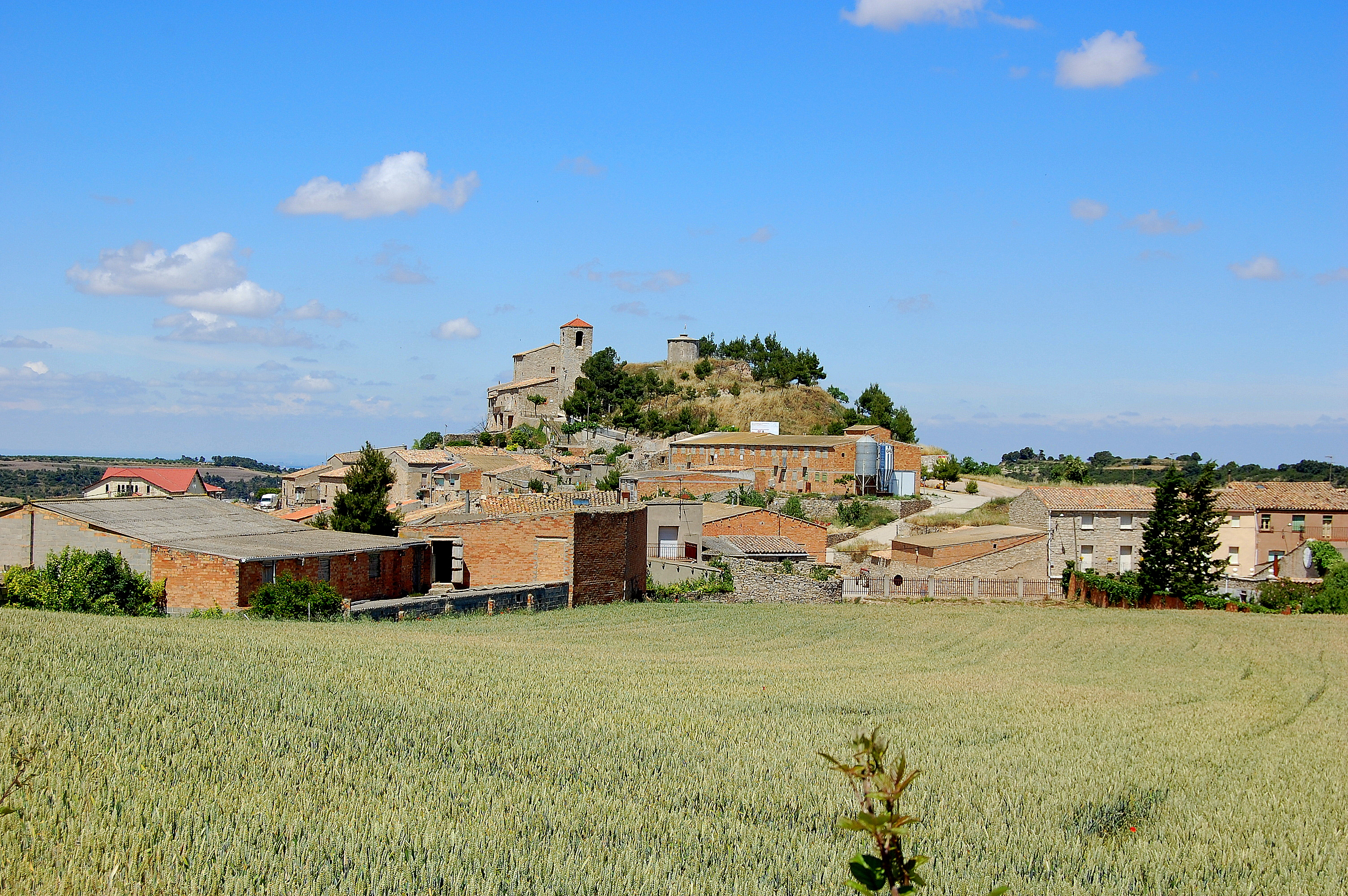

- Coat of arms

- Location in Catalonia Montornès de Segarra (Catalonia) Montornès de Segarra (Spain)
- Coordinates: 41°36′10″N 1°13′54″E
- Country: Spain
- Community: Catalonia
- Province: Lleida
- Comarca: Segarra

Government
  - Mayor: Laura Cortada Cortada (2015)

Area
  - Total: 12.3 km^{2} (4.7 sq mi)
- Elevation: 605 m (1,985 ft)

Population (2025-01-01)
  - Total: 87
  - Density: 7.1/km^{2} (18/sq mi)
- Website: montornes.ddl.net

Montornès de Segarra (Catalan pronunciation: [montoɾˈnez ðe seˈɣara]) is a municipality in the comarca of the Segarra in the Province of Lleida, in Catalonia, Spain. It is situated in the west of the comarca and is served by the L-210 road. Montornès de Segarra became part of the Segarra in the comarcal revision of 1990: previously it formed part of the Urgell. The municipality contains two urban centres, Montornès de Segarra and Mas de Bondia.

== Population ==
It has a population of 87 (register office, 2025).

1900	1930	1950	1970	1986	2010
306	361	273	202	132	104
