= Montoliu de Segarra =

- Municipality
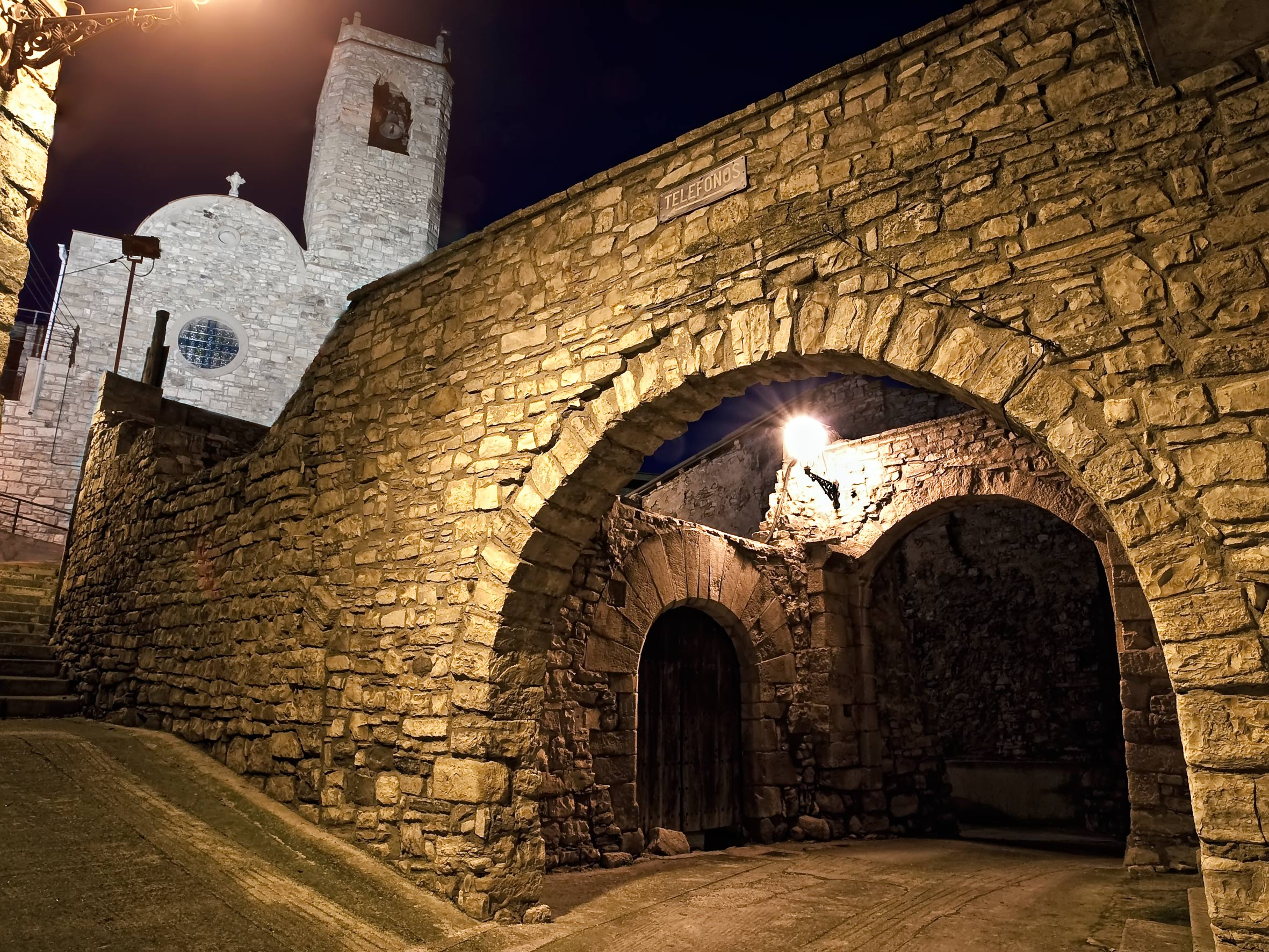
- Montoliu

- Coat of arms

- Location in Catalonia
- Coordinates: 41°35′31″N 1°16′18″E
- Country: Spain
- Community: Catalonia
- Province: Lleida
- Comarca: Segarra

Government
  - Mayor: Vicenç Roig Solé (2015)

Area
  - Total: 29.5 km^{2} (11.4 sq mi)

Population (2025-01-01)
  - Total: 180
  - Density: 6.1/km^{2} (16/sq mi)
- Website: www.montoliusegarra.cat

Montoliu de Segarra (Catalan pronunciation: [montoˈliw ðe seˈɣara]) is a village in the province of Lleida and autonomous community of Catalonia, Spain.

It has a population of 180 (register office, 2025).
