= La Tallada =

- Locality
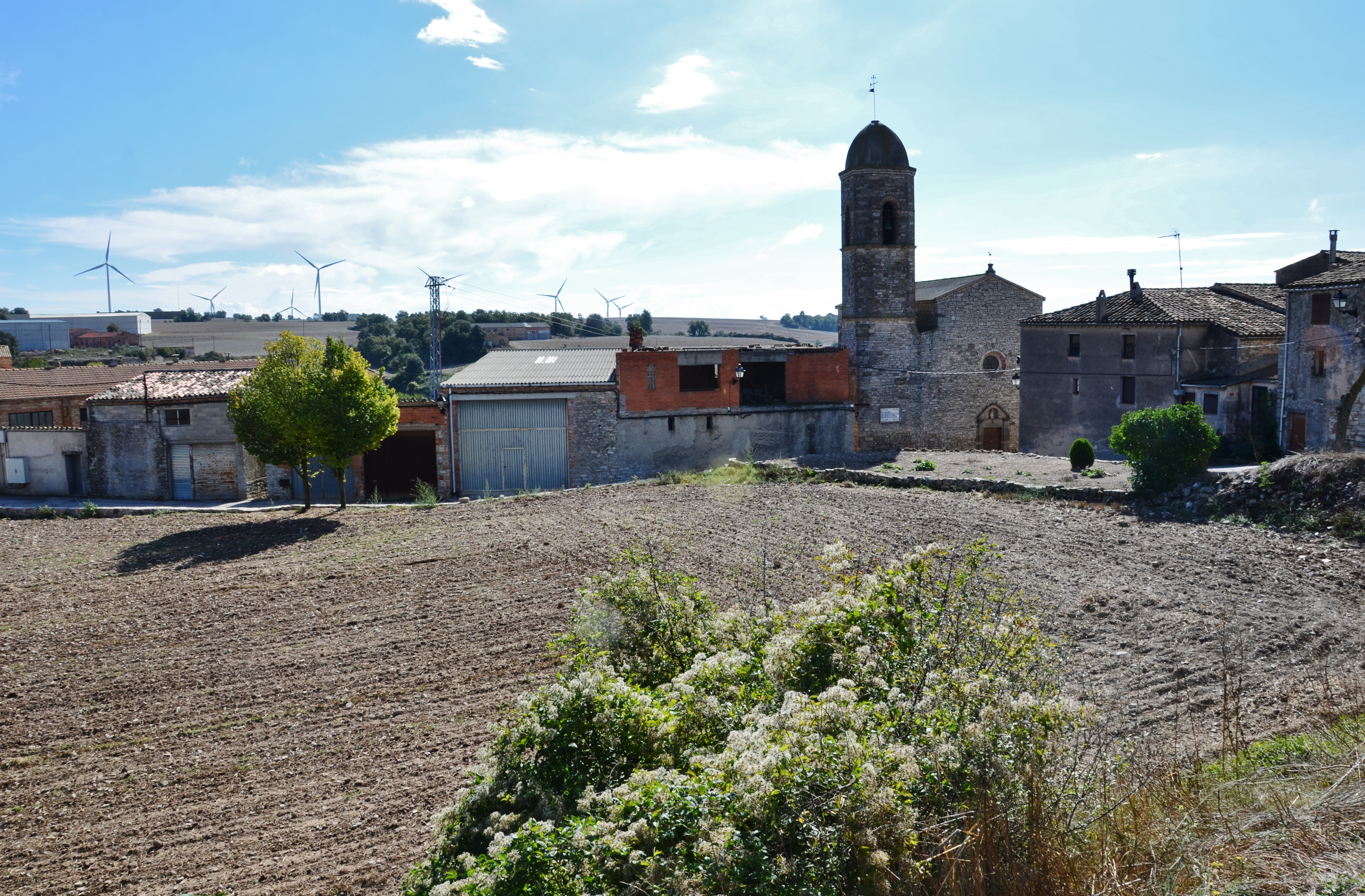

- Location within Province of Lleida Location within Catalonia Location within Spain
- Coordinates: 41°38′25″N 1°24′59″E
- Country: Spain
- Community: Catalonia
- Province: Lleida
- Municipality: Sant Guim de Freixenet
- Elevation: 740 m (2,430 ft)

Population
  - Total: 37

La Tallada is a locality located in the municipality of Sant Guim de Freixenet, in Province of Lleida province, Catalonia, Spain. As of 2020, it has a population of 37.

== Geography ==
La Tallada is located 84km east of Lleida.
