= Freixenet de Segarra =

- Locality
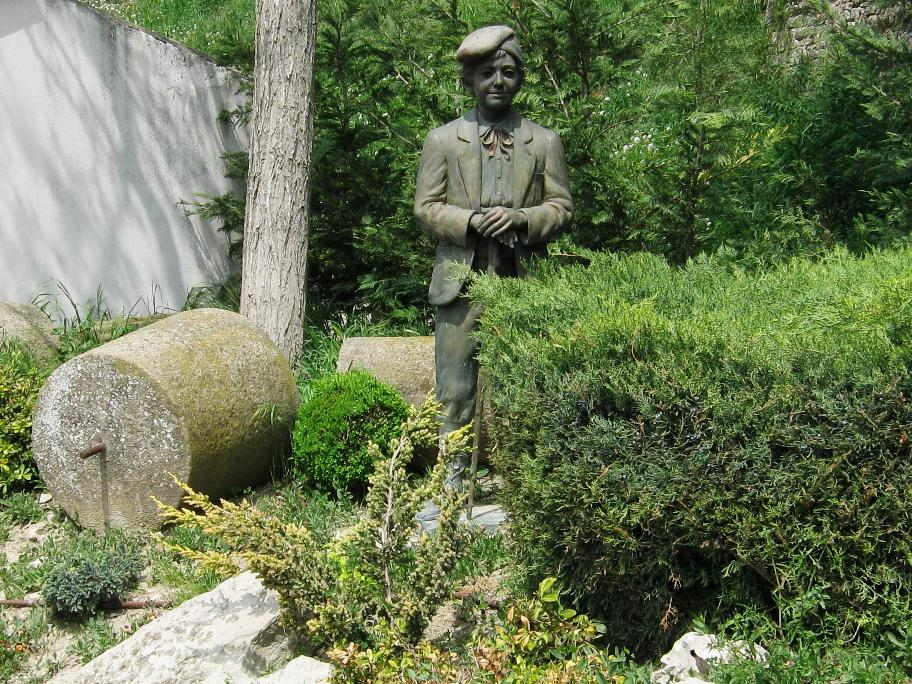

- Location within Province of Lleida Location within Catalonia Location within Spain
- Coordinates: 41°39′39″N 1°23′46″E
- Country: Spain
- Community: Catalonia
- Province: Lleida
- Municipality: Sant Guim de Freixenet
- Elevation: 652 m (2,139 ft)

Population
  - Total: 36

Freixenet de Segarra is a locality located in the municipality of Sant Guim de Freixenet, in Province of Lleida province, Catalonia, Spain. As of 2020, it has a population of 36.

== Geography ==
Freixenet de Segarra is located 82km east of Lleida.
