= Biosca =

- Municipality
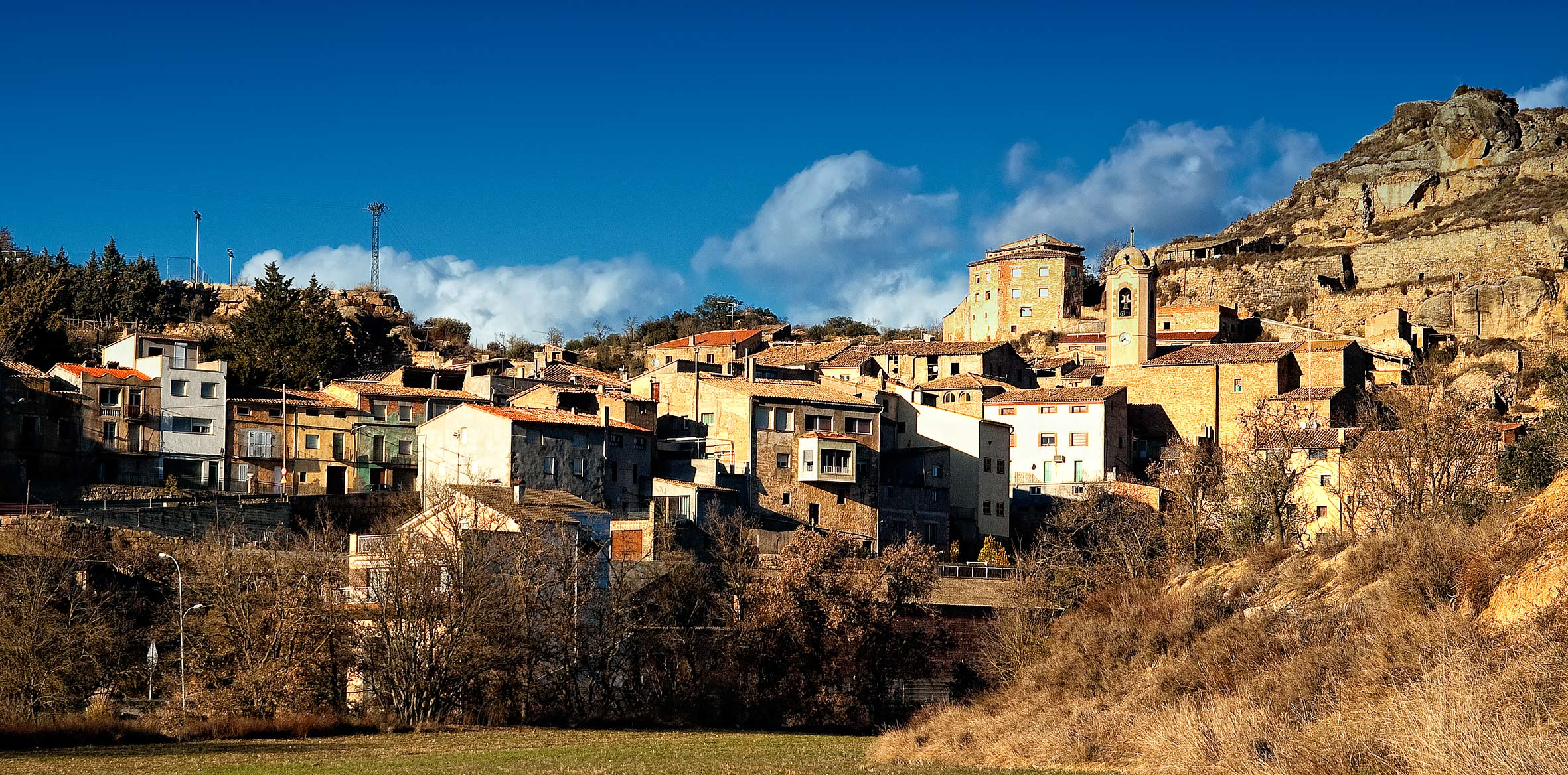
- Biosca

- Flag Coat of arms

- Location in Catalonia
- Coordinates: 41.842°N 1.358°E
- Country: Spain
- Community: Catalonia
- Province: Lleida
- Region: Central Catalonia
- Comarca: Solsonès

Government
  - Mayor: Cornelio Caubet Camats (2015)

Area
  - Total: 66.2 km^{2} (25.6 sq mi)

Population (2025-01-01)
  - Total: 185
  - Density: 2.79/km^{2} (7.24/sq mi)
- Climate: Cfb
- Website: biosca.ddl.net

Biosca (Catalan pronunciation: [biˈɔska]) is a municipality in the province of Lleida and autonomous community of Catalonia, Spain. It has a population of 185 (register office, 2025).

== Population history ==
- 1900 – 835
- 1930 – 670
- 1950 – 585
- 1981 – 382
- 1986 – 283
