= Melió =

- Locality
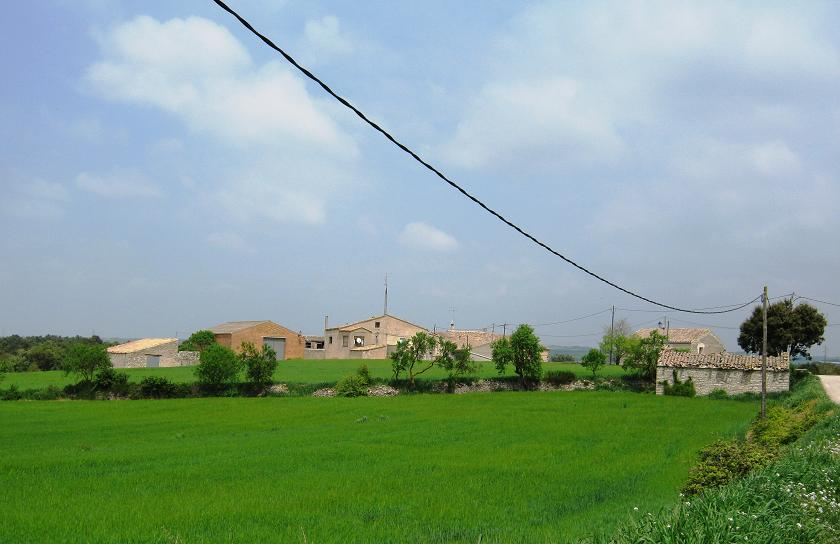

- Location within Province of Lleida Location within Catalonia Location within Spain
- Coordinates: 41°40′18″N 1°23′47″E
- Country: Spain
- Community: Catalonia
- Province: Lleida
- Municipality: Sant Guim de Freixenet
- Elevation: 662 m (2,172 ft)

Population
  - Total: 3

Melió is a locality located in the municipality of Sant Guim de Freixenet, in Province of Lleida province, Catalonia, Spain. As of 2020, it has a population of 3.

== Geography ==
Melió is located 82km east of Lleida.
