= Tarroja de Segarra =

- Municipality
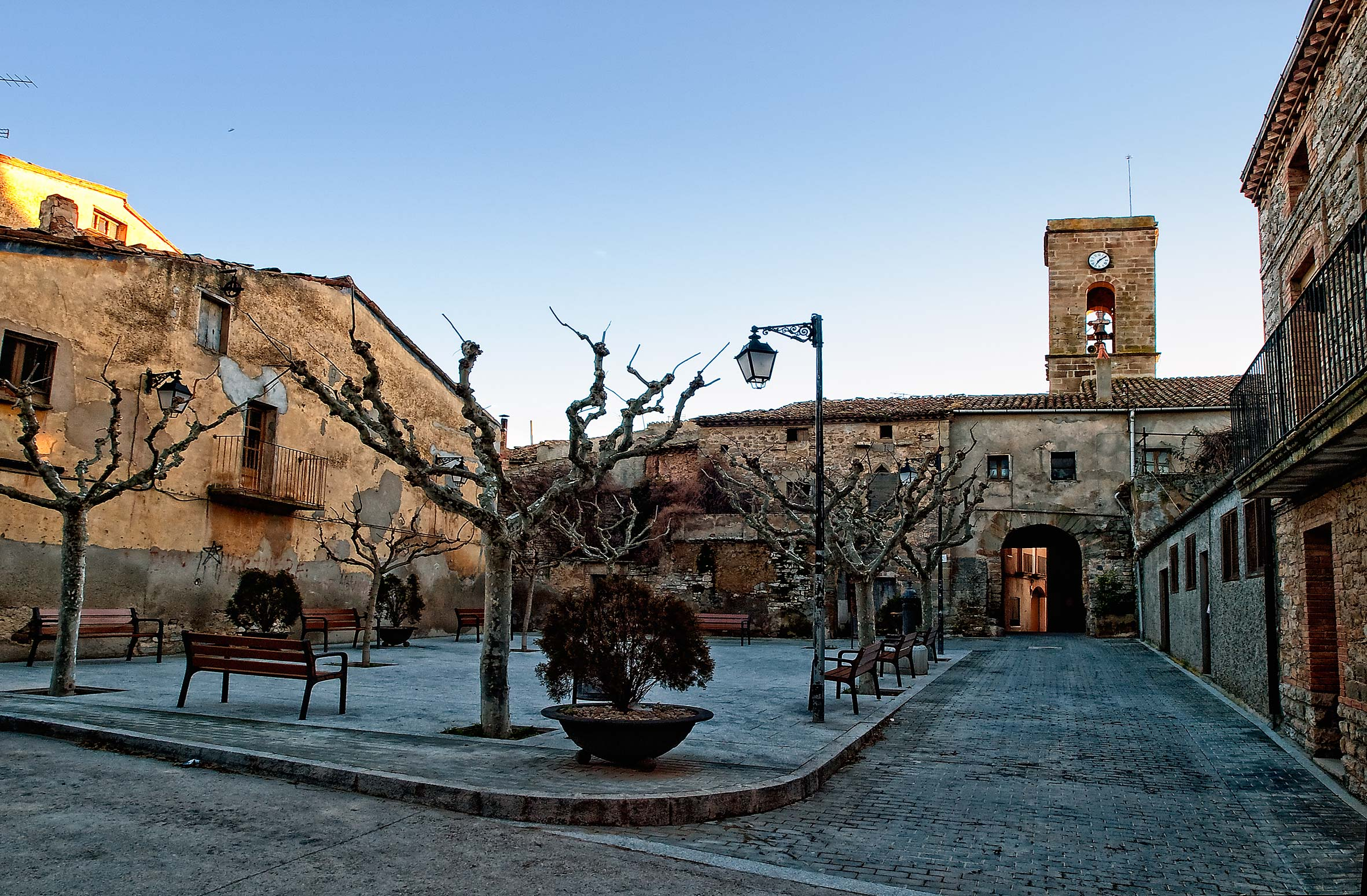
- Plaça Nova, Tarroja

- Flag Coat of arms

- Location in Catalonia
- Coordinates: 41°43′58″N 1°16′37″E
- Country: Spain
- Community: Catalonia
- Province: Lleida
- Comarca: Segarra

Government
  - Mayor: Inmaculada Secanell Viladot (2015)

Area
  - Total: 7.6 km^{2} (2.9 sq mi)

Population (2025-01-01)
  - Total: 164
  - Density: 22/km^{2} (56/sq mi)
- Website: tarroja.ddl.net

Tarroja de Segarra (Catalan pronunciation: [taˈrɔʒa ðe seˈɣara]) is a village in the province of Lleida and autonomous community of Catalonia, Spain.

It has a population of 164 (register office, 2025).
