= Sanaüja =

- Municipality
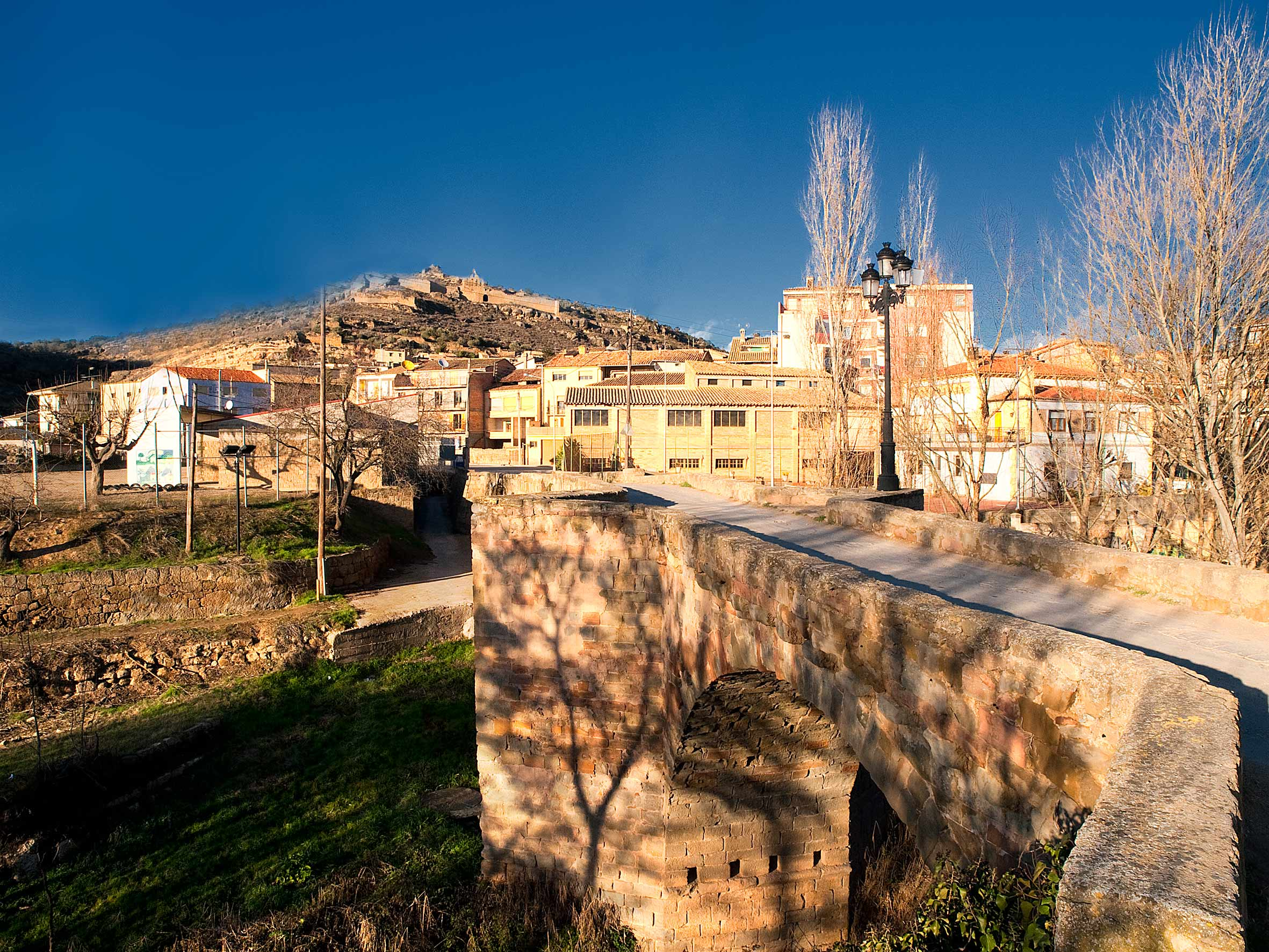
- Sanaüja with its castle

- Flag Coat of arms

- Location in Catalonia
- Coordinates: 41°52′41″N 1°18′44″E
- Country: Spain
- Community: Catalonia
- Province: Lleida
- Comarca: Segarra

Government
  - Mayor: Josep Condal Espuga (2015)

Area
  - Total: 33.0 km^{2} (12.7 sq mi)
- Elevation: 409 m (1,342 ft)

Population (2021)
  - Total: 396
  - Density: 12.0/km^{2} (31.1/sq mi)
- Postal code: 25753
- Website: sanauja.cat

Sanaüja (Catalan pronunciation: [sanaˈuʒa]) is a village in the province of Lleida and autonomous community of Catalonia, Spain.

It has a population of 385 (register office, 2025).
