= Granyena de Segarra =

- Municipality
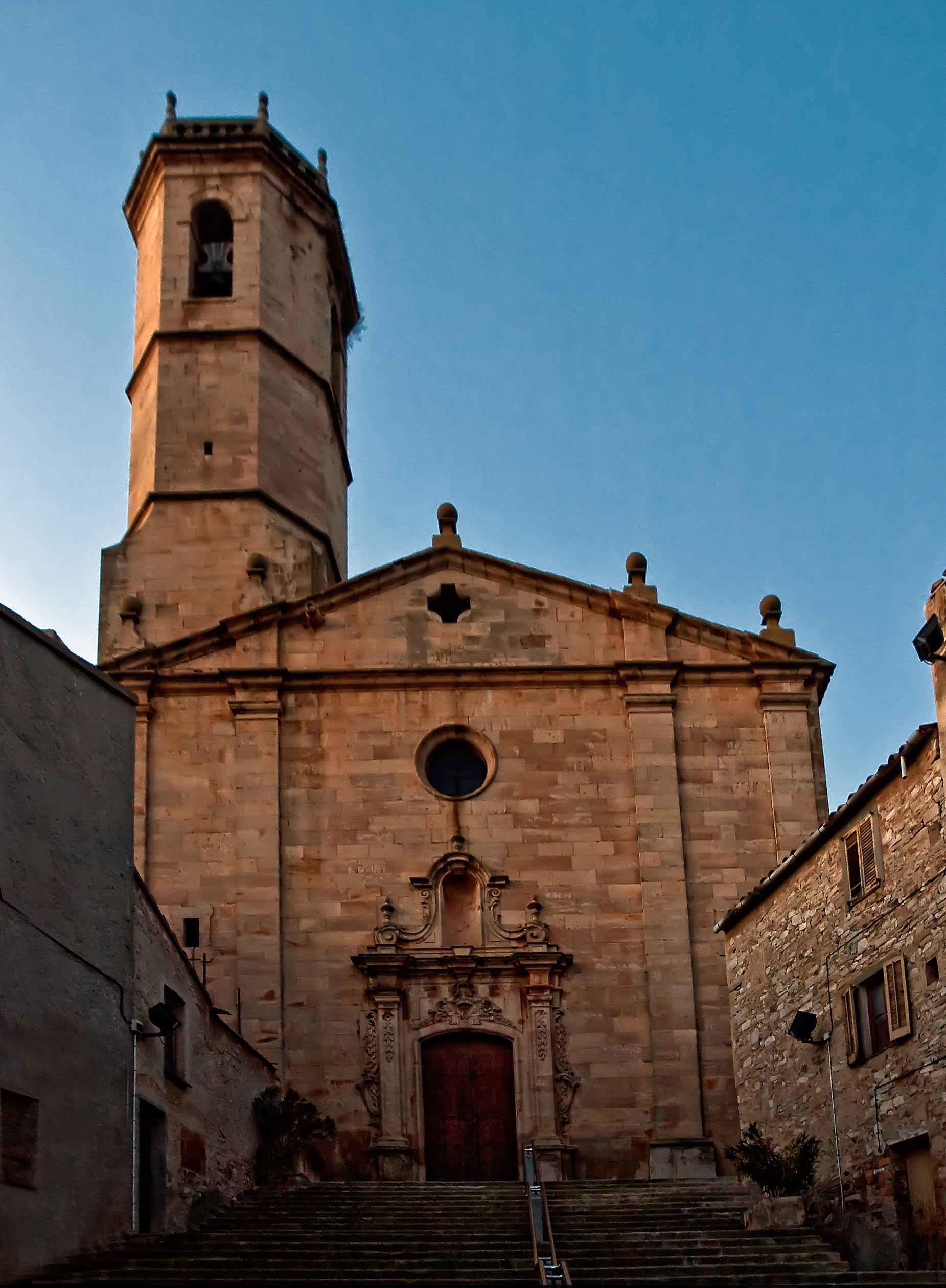
- St. Mary's church, Granyena

- Coat of arms

- Location in Catalonia
- Coordinates: 41°37′32″N 1°14′49″E
- Country: Spain
- Community: Catalonia
- Province: Lleida
- Comarca: Segarra

Government
  - Mayor: Francisco Capdevila Prat (2015)

Area
  - Total: 16.3 km^{2} (6.3 sq mi)

Population (2025-01-01)
  - Total: 149
  - Density: 9.14/km^{2} (23.7/sq mi)
- Website: granyenasegarra.ddl.net

Granyena de Segarra (Catalan pronunciation: [gɾaˈɲena ðe seˈɣara]) is a village in the province of Lleida and autonomous community of Catalonia, Spain.

It has a population of 149 (register office, 2025).
