= 2002 FIFA World Cup qualification – CAF second round =

The CAF second round of 2002 FIFA World Cup qualification was contested between the 25 winners from the first round split across five groups.

The top country in each group at the end of the stage progressed to the 2002 FIFA World Cup.

== Group A ==
Pos	Team	Pld	W	D	L	GF	GA	GD	Pts	Qualification	(Cameroon)	(Angola)	(Zambia)	(Togo)	(Libya)
1	Cameroon	8	6	1	1	14	4	+10	19	2002 FIFA World Cup	—	3–0	1–0	2–0	1–0
2	Angola	8	3	4	1	11	9	+2	13		2–0	—	2–1	1–1	3–1
3	Zambia	8	3	2	3	14	11	+3	11		2–2	1–1	—	2–0	2–0
4	Togo	8	2	3	3	10	13	−3	9		0–2	1–1	3–2	—	2–0
5	Libya	8	0	2	6	7	19	−12	2		0–3	1–1	2–4	3–3	—

18 June 2000
15:30 UTC+01

Angola	2–1	Zambia
Akwá 76', 78'	Report	Sinkala 35'

Estádio da Cidadela, Luanda
Attendance: 50,000
Referee: Petros Mathabela (South Africa)
18 June 2000
18:00 UTC+02

Libya	0–3	Cameroon
	Report	Mboma 36', 67', 87' (pen.)

June 11 Stadium, Tripoli
Attendance: 60,000
Referee: Mourad Daami (Tunisia)

8 July 2000
15:30 UTC+02

Zambia	2–0	Togo
Milanzi 26'; Nsofwa 66'	Report

Independence Stadium, Lusaka
Attendance: 18,000
Referee: Hailemelak Tessema (Ethiopia)
9 July 2000
15:00 UTC+01

Cameroon	3–0	Angola
Abanda 18'; Tchoutang 68', 75'	Report

Ahmadou Ahidjo Stadium, Yaoundé
Attendance: 25,000
Referee: Mohamed Guezzaz (Morocco)

28 January 2001
15:30 UTC+01

Angola	3–1	Libya
Bodunha 48', 51'; Akwá 75'	Report	Jehad Muntasser 17'

Estádio da Cidadela, Luanda
Attendance: 55,000
Referee: Felix Tangawarima (Zimbabwe)
28 January 2001
16:00 UTC+0

Togo	0–2	Cameroon
	Report	Eto'o 56'; Mboma 69'

Stade de Kégué, Lomé
Attendance: 24,000
Referee: Falla N'Doye (Senegal)

23 February 2001
16:00 UTC+02

Libya	3–3	Togo
Khalifa 11' (pen.); Elfallah 25', 80'	Report	Salifou 21'; Amewou 30'; Zanzan 78'

March 28 Stadium, Benghazi
Attendance: 3,000
Referee: Said Belqola (Morocco)
25 February 2001
15:30 UTC+01

Cameroon	1–0	Zambia
Mboma 22'	Report

Ahmadou Ahidjo Stadium, Yaoundé
Attendance: 76,000
Referee: Gamal Al-Ghandour (Egypt)

10 March 2001
15:00 UTC+2

Zambia	2–0	Libya
Mwewa 11'; Lota 24'	Report

Nchanga Stadium, Chingola
Attendance: 7,080
Referee: Edwin Senai (Botswana)
11 March 2001
16:00 UTC+0

Togo	1–1	Angola
Coubageat 63'	Report	Akwá 67'

Stade de Kégué, Lomé
Attendance: 3,000
Referee: Chukwudi Chukwujekwu (Nigeria)

21 April 2001
15:00 UTC+2

Zambia	1–1	Angola
Lota 46'	Report	Gilberto 18'

Nchanga Stadium, Chingola
Attendance: 15,000
Referee: Isaack Abdulkadir (Tanzania)
22 April 2001
15:30 UTC+01

Cameroon	1–0	Libya
Lauren 78'	Report

Ahmadou Ahidjo Stadium, Yaoundé
Attendance: 55,000
Referee: Petros Mathabela (South Africa)

6 May 2001
15:30 UTC+01

Angola	2–0	Cameroon
Akwá 60'; Quinzinho 69'	Report

Estádio da Cidadela, Luanda
Attendance: 40,000
Referee: Robin Williams (South Africa)
6 May 2001
16:00 UTC+0

Togo	3–2	Zambia
Assignon 48'; Doté 80'; Akoto 86'	Report	Tana 15'; Kunda 65'

Stade de Kégué, Lomé
Attendance: 10,000
Referee: Abderrahim El Arjoun (Morocco)

29 June 2001
18:00 UTC+02

Libya	1–1	Angola
Elharbi 35'	Report	Zico 90'

June 11 Stadium, Tripoli
Attendance: 2,000
Referee: Lucien Bouchardeau (Niger)
1 July 2001
15:00 UTC+01

Cameroon	2–0	Togo
Eto'o 28'; Foé 48'	Report

Ahmadou Ahidjo Stadium, Yaoundé
Attendance: 60,000
Referee: Chukwudi Chukwujekwu (Nigeria)

14 July 2001
15:00 UTC+02

Zambia	2–2	Cameroon
Mwewa 60'; Nsofwa 66'	Report	Foé 52'; Ndiefi 64'

Independence Stadium, Lusaka
Attendance: 30,000
Referee: Reda El-Beltagy (Egypt)
15 July 2001
16:00 UTC+02

Togo	2–0	Libya
Kossi 26', 43'	Report

Stade de Kégué, Lomé
Attendance: 20,000
Referee: Abdou Diouf (Senegal)

27 July 2001
18:00 UTC+02

Libya	2–4	Zambia
Kablan 17', 28'	Report	Nsofwa 32'; Kilambe 48', 72'; Fichite 61'

June 11 Stadium, Tripoli
Attendance: 120
Referee: Mohsen Boukthir (Tunisia)
29 July 2001
15:30 UTC+01

Angola	1–1	Togo
Akwá 26'	Report	Alfa 29'

Estádio da Cidadela, Luanda
Attendance: 5,626
Referee: Felix Tangawarima (Zimbabwe)

== Group B ==
Pos	Team	Pld	W	D	L	GF	GA	GD	Pts	Qualification	(Nigeria)	(Liberia)	(Sudan)	(Ghana)	(Sierra Leone)
1	Nigeria	8	5	1	2	15	3	+12	16	2002 FIFA World Cup	—	2–0	3–0	3–0	2–0
2	Liberia	8	5	0	3	10	8	+2	15		2–1	—	2–0	1–2	1–0
3	Sudan	8	4	0	4	8	10	−2	12		0–4	2–0	—	1–0	3–0
4	Ghana	8	3	2	3	10	9	+1	11		0–0	1–3	1–0	—	5–0
5	Sierra Leone	8	1	1	6	2	15	−13	4		1–0	0–1	0–2	1–1	—

17 June 2000
16:00 UTC+01

Nigeria	2–0	Sierra Leone
Okocha 12'; Akwuegbu 37'	Report

Lagos National Stadium, Lagos
Attendance: 25,000
Referee: Malick Sillah (Gambia)
18 June 2000
20:00 UTC+03

Sudan	2–0	Liberia
Moga 53'; Mujahid Ahmed 88'	Report

Stade de Omdurman, Omdurman
Attendance: 35,000
Referee: Reda El-Beltagy (Egypt)

9 July 2000
16:00 UTC+0

Ghana	5–0	Sierra Leone
Amoah 19', 61'; Akonnor 68'; Preko 75'; Addo 89'	Report

Accra Sports Stadium, Accra
Attendance: 18,300
Referee: Modou Sowe (Gambia)
9 July 2000
15:00 UTC+0

Liberia	2–1	Nigeria
Wreh 4'; Kpoto 36'	Report	Oliseh 49'

National Complex, Monrovia
Attendance: 50,000
Referee: Hichem Guirat (Tunisia)

27 January 2001
16:00 UTC+01

Nigeria	3–0	Sudan
Agali 57', 67'; Kanu 82'	Report

Liberation Stadium, Port Harcourt
Attendance: 45,000
Referee: Gamal Al-Ghandour (Egypt)
28 January 2001
16:00 UTC+0

Ghana	1–3	Liberia
Duah 70'	Report	Seator 10'; Makor 85'; Shannon 89'

Accra Sports Stadium, Accra
Attendance: 30,000
Referee: Mohamed Guezzaz (Morocco)

25 February 2001
16:00 UTC+0

Liberia	1–0	Sierra Leone
Roberts 65'	Report

National Complex, Monrovia
Attendance: 35,000
Referee: Malick Sillah (Gambia)
25 February 2001
20:00 UTC+03

Sudan	1–0	Ghana
Moga 70'	Report

Al Merreikh Stadium, Omdurman
Attendance: 30,000
Referee: Hailemelak Tessema (Ethiopia)

10 March 2001
16:30 UTC+0

Sierra Leone	0–2	Sudan
	Report	Moga 43'; Khalid Bakhit 44'

National Stadium, Freetown
Attendance: 30,000
Referee: Atef Yacoubi (Tunisia)
11 March 2001
16:00 UTC+0

Ghana	0–0	Nigeria
	Report

Accra Sports Stadium, Accra
Attendance: 34,491
Referee: Felix Tangawarima (Zimbabwe)

21 April 2001
16:30 UTC+0

Sierra Leone	1–0	Nigeria
Mansaray 25'	Report

National Stadium, Freetown
Attendance: 35,000
Referee: Sharaf Aboubacar (Ivory Coast)
22 April 2001
16:00 UTC+0

Liberia	2–0	Sudan
Sebwe 35'; Weah 48'	Report

National Complex, Monrovia
Attendance: 35,000
Referee: Coffi Codjia (Benin)

5 May 2001
16:00 UTC+01

Nigeria	2–0	Liberia
Kanu 11'; Agali 59'	Report

Liberation Stadium, Port Harcourt
Attendance: 12,000
Referee: Lim Kee Chong (Mauritius)
5 May 2001
16:30 UTC+0

Sierra Leone	1–1	Ghana
Bah 87'	Report	Ayew 35'

National Stadium, Freetown
Attendance: 35,000
Referee: Abdou Diouf (Senegal)

1 July 2001
16:00 UTC+0

Liberia	1–2	Ghana
Sebwe 44'	Report	Amoah 32'; Boakye 58'

National Complex, Monrovia
Attendance: 35,000
Referee: Kamel Berber (Algeria)
1 July 2001
20:00 UTC+03

Sudan	0–4	Nigeria
	Report	Okocha 40'; Yakubu 47', 87'; Aghahowa 78'

Al Merreikh Stadium, Omdurman
Attendance: 23,100
Referee: Isaack Abdulkadir (Tanzania)

14 July 2001
16:30 UTC+0

Sierra Leone	0–1	Liberia
	Report	Weah 72'

National Stadium, Freetown
Attendance: 40,000
Referee: Modou Sowe (Gambia)
15 July 2001
15:00 UTC+0

Ghana	1–0	Sudan
Kuffour 44'	Report

Accra Sports Stadium, Accra
Attendance: 7,000
Referee: Lucien Bouchardeau (Niger)

29 July 2001
16:00 UTC+01

Nigeria	3–0	Ghana
Agali 1'; Babangida 18', 32'	Report

Liberation Stadium, Port Harcourt
Attendance: 17,000
Referee: Hichem Guirat (Tunisia)
29 July 2001
20:00 UTC+03

Sudan	3–0	Sierra Leone
Edward Jildo 17'; Khalid Bakhit 40'; Khalid Ahmed Elmustafa 69'	Report

Al Merreikh Stadium, Omdurman
Attendance: 8,000
Referee: Yusuf Awuye (Uganda)

== Group C ==
Pos	Team	Pld	W	D	L	GF	GA	GD	Pts	Qualification	(Senegal)	(Morocco)	(Egypt)	(Algeria)	(Namibia)
1	Senegal	8	4	3	1	14	2	+12	15	2002 FIFA World Cup	—	1–0	0–0	3–0	4–0
2	Morocco	8	4	3	1	8	3	+5	15		0–0	—	1–0	2–1	3–0
3	Egypt	8	3	4	1	16	7	+9	13		1–0	0–0	—	5–2	8–2
4	Algeria	8	2	2	4	11	14	−3	8		1–1	1–2	1–1	—	1–0
5	Namibia	8	0	2	6	3	26	−23	2		0–5	0–0	1–1	0–4	—

16 June 2000
17:00 UTC+01

Algeria	1–1	Senegal
Saïfi 27'	Report	Diop 16'

Stade 19 Mai 1956, Annaba
Attendance: 70,000
Referee: Sidi Bekaye Magassa (Mali)
17 June 2000
15:00 UTC+01

Namibia	0–0	Morocco
	Report

Sam Nujoma Stadium, Windhoek
Attendance: 5,000
Referee: Edwin Senai (Botswana)

9 July 2000
16:30 UTC+0

Senegal	0–0	Egypt
	Report

Stade Leopold Senghor, Dakar
Attendance: 30,367
Referee: Lim Kee Chong (Mauritius)
9 July 2000
20:00 UTC+1

Morocco	2–1	Algeria
Hadda 51', 75'	Report	Meçabih 35'

Fez Stadium, Fes
Attendance: 10,000
Referee: Ferid Sahli (Tunisia)

26 January 2001
15:30 UTC+01

Algeria	1–0	Namibia
Belmadi 34'	Report

Stade 5 Juillet 1962, Algiers
Attendance: 30,000
Referee: Hichem Guirat (Tunisia)
28 January 2001
18:00 UTC+2

Egypt	0–0	Morocco
	Report

Cairo International Stadium, Cairo
Attendance: 60,000
Referee: Abdullhakim Shelmani (Libya)

24 February 2001
16:00 UTC+2

Namibia	1–1	Egypt
Tjikuzu 51'	Report	Said 89'

Sam Nujoma Stadium, Windhoek
Attendance: 15,000
Referee: Petros Mathabela (South Africa)
24 February 2001
19:00 UTC+01

Morocco	0–0	Senegal
	Report

Prince Moulay Abdellah Stadium, Rabat
Attendance: 60,000
Referee: Felix Tangawarima (Zimbabwe)

10 March 2001
17:00 UTC+0

Senegal	4–0	Namibia
Diouf 24', 44', 52'; H.Camara 64'	Report

Stade Leopold Senghor, Dakar
Attendance: 50,000
Referee: Hailemelak Tessema (Ethiopia)
11 March 2001
19:00 UTC+2

Egypt	5–2	Algeria
Barakat 7'; Sabry 17'; El-Saqqa 39'; El-Said 85', 88'	Report	Tasfaout 12'; Meçabih 37'

Cairo International Stadium, Cairo
Attendance: 45,000
Referee: Lim Kee Chong (Mauritius)

21 April 2001
17:00 UTC+0

Senegal	3–0	Algeria
Diouf 2', 47', 75'	Report

Stade Leopold Senghor, Dakar
Attendance: 45,000
Referee: Abdullhakim Shelmani (Libya)
21 April 2001
19:00 UTC+2

Morocco	3–0	Namibia
Rokki 49'; Hadda 75', 90'	Report

Prince Moulay Abdellah Stadium, Rabat
Attendance: 15,000
Referee: Koman Coulibaly (Mali)

4 May 2001
17:00 UTC+01

Algeria	1–2	Morocco
Tasfaout 10'	Report	Benmahmoud 17'; Amzine 46'

Stade 5 Juillet 1962, Algiers
Attendance: 15,000
Referee: Hichem Guirat (Tunisia)
6 May 2001
20:15 UTC+3

Egypt	1–0	Senegal
Mido 48'	Report

Cairo International Stadium, Cairo
Attendance: 75,000
Referee: Lucien Bouchardeau (Niger)

30 June 2001
15:00 UTC+1

Namibia	0–4	Algeria
	Report	Settara 31'; Ouahid 35', 37'; Aouni 72'

Sam Nujoma Stadium, Windhoek
Attendance: 900
Referee: Robin Williams (South Africa)
30 June 2001
19:00 UTC+02

Morocco	1–0	Egypt
Hadji 32'	Report

Prince Moulay Abdellah Stadium, Rabat
Attendance: 45,000
Referee: Edwin Senai (Botswana)

13 July 2001
20:30 UTC+3

Egypt	8–2	Namibia
El-Said 5'; Barakat 36', 73'; Bassiouny 40', 43', 44'; Salah 77'; Sabry 88'	Report	Mkontwana 53'; Gariseb 70'

Alexandria Stadium, Alexandria
Attendance: 21,000
Referee: Mohamed Abdalla (Libya)
14 July 2001
17:00 UTC+0

Senegal	1–0	Morocco
Diouf 17'	Report

Stade Leopold Senghor, Dakar
Attendance: 60,000
Referee: Petros Mathabela (South Africa)

21 July 2001
16:00 UTC+01

Algeria	1–1	Egypt
Bezzaz 68'	Report	Mido 60' (pen.)

Stade 19 Mai 1956, Annaba
Attendance: 38,000
Referee: Coffi Codjia (Benin)
21 July 2001
16:00 UTC+01

Namibia	0–5	Senegal
	Report	Thiaw 15', 30'; Diouf 23'; Fadiga 79'; N'Diaye 81'

Sam Nujoma Stadium, Windhoek
Attendance: 800
Referee: Benjamina Ravelontsalama (Madagascar)

== Group D ==
Pos	Team	Pld	W	D	L	GF	GA	GD	Pts	Qualification	(Tunisia)	(Ivory Coast)	(Democratic Republic of the Congo)	(Madagascar)	(Republic of the Congo)
1	Tunisia	8	6	2	0	23	4	+19	20	2002 FIFA World Cup	—	1–1	6–0	1–0	6–0
2	Ivory Coast	8	4	3	1	18	8	+10	15		2–2	—	1–2	6–0	2–0
3	DR Congo	8	3	1	4	7	16	−9	10		0–3	1–2	—	1–0	2–0
4	Madagascar	8	2	0	6	5	15	−10	6		0–2	1–3	3–0	—	1–0
5	Congo	8	1	2	5	5	15	−10	5		1–2	1–1	1–1	2–0	—

17 June 2000
14:30 UTC+03

Madagascar	3–0	DR Congo
Suiverstin 18'; Rasoanaivo 53'; Randrianaivo 83'	Report

Mahamasina Municipal Stadium, Antananarivo
Attendance: 18,000
Referee: Lim Kee Chong (Mauritius)
18 June 2000
16:00 UTC+0

Ivory Coast	2–2	Tunisia
Bakayoko 45+1'; Kalou 53'	Report	Mhedhebi 13'; Ghodhbane 20'

Stade Félix Houphouët-Boigny, Abidjan
Attendance: 15,000
Referee: Ahmed Auda (Egypt)

8 July 2000
19:00 UTC+1

Tunisia	1–0	Madagascar
Baya 43'	Report

Stade El Menzah, Tunis
Attendance: 6,000
Referee: Olufunmi Orimisan Olaniyan (Nigeria)
9 July 2000
15:30 UTC+1

DR Congo	2–0	Congo
Mayélé 40'; Yemweni 74'	Report

Stade des Martyrs, Kinshasa
Attendance: 60,000
Referee: Felix Tangawarima (Zimbabwe)

28 January 2001
14:30 UTC+03

Madagascar	1–3	Ivory Coast
Menakely 58'	Report	Bakayoko 39', 46'; Zoko 86'

Mahamasina Municipal Stadium, Antananarivo
Attendance: 27,600
Referee: Simon Motau (South Africa)
28 January 2001
15:00 UTC+1

Congo	1–2	Tunisia
Bongo 42'	Report	Zitouni 38'; Jaziri 58'

Stade Municipal, Pointe-Noire
Attendance: 7,000
Referee: Said Belqola (Morocco)

25 February 2001
16:00 UTC+1

Tunisia	6–0	DR Congo
Zitouni 8', 90'; Jaziri 26', 64'; Kanzari 30'; Baya 84'	Report

Stade El Menzah, Tunis
Attendance: 30,000
Referee: Mohamed Guezzaz (Morocco)

10 March 2001
15:30 UTC+01

DR Congo	1–2	Ivory Coast
Kimoto 90'	Report	Guel 17'; Bakayoko 45'

Stade des Martyrs, Kinshasa
Attendance: 50,000
Referee: Lucien Bouchardeau (Niger)

22 April 2001
15:30 UTC+0

DR Congo	1–0	Madagascar
Inunu 42'	Report

Stade des Martyrs, Kinshasa
Attendance: 60,000
Referee: Chukwudi Chukwujekwu (Nigeria)
22 April 2001
16:00 UTC+0

Ivory Coast	2–0	Congo
Keïta 39'; Bakayoko 85'	Report

Stade Félix Houphouët-Boigny, Abidjan
Attendance: 8,645
Referee: Alex Quartey (Ghana)

28 April 2001
15:30 UTC+1

Congo	2–0	Madagascar
Ranaivoson 42' (o.g.); Minga 75'	Report

Stade Municipal, Pointe-Noire
Attendance: 499
Referee: Robin Williams (South Africa)

5 May 2001
14:30 UTC+3

Madagascar	0–2	Tunisia
	Report	Zitouni 85'; Mhedhebi 90'

Mahamasina Municipal Stadium, Antananarivo
Attendance: 5,016
Referee: Jean-Claude Labrosse (Seychelles)
6 May 2001
15:30 UTC+01

Congo	1–1	DR Congo
Bakouma 45+2'	Report	Matondo 90+2'

Stade Municipal, Pointe-Noire
Attendance: 5,000
Referee: Ladoual Hisseine (Chad)

20 May 2001
18:00 UTC+1

Tunisia	1–1	Ivory Coast
Jaziri 49'	Report	Bakayoko 33'

Stade El Menzah, Tunis
Attendance: 40,000
Referee: Felix Tangawarima (Zimbabwe)

1 July 2001
16:00 UTC+0

Ivory Coast	6–0	Madagascar
Bakayoko 25', 40' (pen.), 83'; K.Keïta 48'; Yapi Yapo 71'; F.Keïta 80'	Report

Stade Félix Houphouët-Boigny, Abidjan
Attendance: 15,000
Referee: Lim Kee Chong (Mauritius)
1 July 2001
19:00 UTC+01

Tunisia	6–0	Congo
Badra 28' (pen.); Zitouni 38'; Baya 44', 61'; Mhedhebi 58'; Jelassi 90'	Report

Stade El Menzah, Tunis
Attendance: 25,000
Referee: Said Belqola (Morocco)

15 July 2001
15:30 UTC+1

Congo	1–1	Ivory Coast
Bakouma 86' (pen.)	Report	Traoré 82'

Stade Municipal, Pointe-Noire
Attendance: 20,000
Referee: Hailemelak Tessema (Ethiopia)
15 July 2001
15:30 UTC+01

DR Congo	0–3	Tunisia
	Report	Badra 14'; Baya 50', 54'

Stade des Martyrs, Kinshasa
Attendance: 20,000
Referee: Koman Coulibaly (Mali)

29 July 2001
14:30 UTC+03

Madagascar	1–0	Congo
Randriamarozaka 61'	Report

Mahamasina Municipal Stadium, Antananarivo
Attendance: 694
Referee: Eddy Maillet (Seychelles)
29 July 2001
16:00 UTC+0

Ivory Coast	1–2	DR Congo
Keïta 72'	Report	Tokala 34'; Mulekelayi 79'

Stade Félix Houphouët-Boigny, Abidjan
Attendance: 5,000
Referee: Sule Mana (Nigeria)

== Group E ==
Pos	Team	Pld	W	D	L	GF	GA	GD	Pts	Qualification	(South Africa)	(Zimbabwe)	(Burkina Faso)	(Malawi)	(Guinea)
1	South Africa	6	5	1	0	10	3	+7	16	2002 FIFA World Cup	—	2–1	1–0	2–0	~~Canc.~~
2	Zimbabwe	6	4	0	2	7	5	+2	12		0–2	—	1–0	2–0	~~Canc.~~
3	Burkina Faso	6	1	2	3	7	8	−1	5		1–1	1–2	—	4–2	~~2–3~~
4	Malawi	6	0	1	5	4	12	−8	1		1–2	0–1	1–1	—	~~Canc.~~
5	Guinea (Note: Guinea were excluded on 19 March 2001 due to government interference in football. The results of their three matches were annulled.)	0	0	0	0	0	0	0	0	Excluded	~~Canc.~~	~~3–0~~	~~Canc.~~	~~1–1~~	—

Notes:
17 June 2000
15:00 UTC+2

Malawi	1–1	Burkina Faso
Chitsulo 38'	Report	Zongo 28'

Chichiri Stadium, Blantyre
Attendance: 44,781
Referee: Isaack Abdulkadir (Tanzania)
18 June 2000

Guinea	Annulled (3–0)	Zimbabwe
Dramé 33'; Camara 50'; Youla 60'	Report

Stade du 28 Septembre, Conakry
Attendance: 30,000
Referee: Chukwudi Chukwujekwu (Nigeria)

9 July 2000
15:00 UTC+1

Zimbabwe	0–2	South Africa
	Report	Buckley 7', 83'

National Sports Stadium, Harare
Attendance: 55,000
Referee: Falla N'Doye (Senegal)

The match was abandoned at 83 minutes with the score 0–2 after crowd trouble led police to fire tear gas in the stands, causing a mass panic in which 13 people were killed. The result after 83 minutes was allowed to stand.

9 July 2000

Burkina Faso	Annulled (2–3)	Guinea
Kambou 20'; Touré 72' (pen.)	Report	Youla 12'; Sylla 23'; Feindouno 81'

Stade du 4-Août, Ouagadougou
Attendance: 20,000
Referee: Zeli Sinko (Ivory Coast)

27 January 2001
16:00 UTC+2

South Africa	1–0	Burkina Faso
Bartlett 17'	Report

Olympia Park, Rustenburg
Attendance: 35,000
Referee: Lim Kee Chong (Mauritius)
28 January 2001

Guinea	Annulled (1–1)	Malawi
Bangoura 24'	Report	Mabedi 54' (pen.)

Stade du 28 Septembre, Conakry
Attendance: 15,000
Referee: Chukwudi Chukwujekwu (Nigeria)

24 February 2001
15:30 UTC+0

Burkina Faso	1–2	Zimbabwe
Dagano 23'	Report	Ndlovu 3', 12'

Stade Municipal, Bobo Dioulasso
Attendance: 20,000
Referee: Chukwudi Chukwujekwu (Nigeria)
25 February 2001
15:00 UTC+2

Malawi	1–2	South Africa
Mabedi 84'	Report	Masinga 25'; Nomvethe 81'

Chichiri Stadium, Blantyre
Attendance: 60,000
Referee: Jelas Ntebu Masole (Botswana)

11 March 2001
15:00 UTC+1

Zimbabwe	2–0	Malawi
Benjani 45'; Kasinauyo 83'	Report

National Sports Stadium, Harare
Attendance: 25,000
Referee: Ahmed Auda (Egypt)

21 April 2001
16:00 UTC+0

Burkina Faso	4–2	Malawi
Kambou 32'; H.Traoré 76'; Korbeogo 83'; Yaméogo 90'	Report	Chitsulo 9'; Maduka 78'

Stade du 4-Août, Ouagadougou
Attendance: 22,631
Referee: Gilbert Njike (Cameroon)

5 May 2001
16:00 UTC+2

South Africa	2–1	Zimbabwe
Bartlett 18'; McCarthy 40'	Report	Ndlovu 53'

FNB Stadium, Johannesburg
Attendance: 8,619
Referee: Reda El-Beltagy (Egypt)

1 July 2001
16:00 UTC+0

Burkina Faso	1–1	South Africa
Nana 73'	Report	Zuma 24'

Stade du 4-Août, Ouagadougou
Attendance: 22,770
Referee: Alex Quartey (Ghana)

14 July 2001
15:00 UTC+2

South Africa	2–0	Malawi
Booth 5'; August 54'	Report

Hoffe Park Stadium, Durban
Attendance: 17,500
Referee: Eddy Maillet (Seychelles)
15 July 2001
15:00 UTC+1

Zimbabwe	1–0	Burkina Faso
Makunike 43'	Report

Rufaro Stadium, Harare
Attendance: 10,000
Referee: Salah Salih (Sudan)

28 July 2001
15:00 UTC+2

Malawi	0–1	Zimbabwe
	Report	Masiku 78'

Chichiri Stadium, Blantyre
Attendance: 20,000
Referee: Michel Gasingwa (Rwanda)

== Goalscorers ==
There were 249 goals scored in 95 matches, for an average of 2.62 goals per match.

9 goals

- (Ivory Coast) Ibrahima Bakayoko

8 goals

- (Senegal) El Hadji Diouf

6 goals

- (Angola) Akwá
- (Tunisia) Zoubeir Baya

5 goals

- (Cameroon) Patrick Mboma
- (Tunisia) Ali Zitouni

4 goals

- (Morocco) Abdeljalil Hadda
- (Nigeria) Victor Agali
- (Tunisia) Ziad Jaziri

3 goals

- (Egypt) Mohamed Barakat
- (Egypt) Abdul-Hamid Bassiouny
- (Egypt) Tarek El-Said
- (Ghana) Charles Amoah
- (Ivory Coast) Abdul Kader Keïta
- (Nigeria) Nwankwo Kanu
- (Sudan) James Moga
- (Tunisia) Imed Mhedhebi
- (Zambia) Chaswe Nsofwa
- (Zimbabwe) Peter Ndlovu

2 goals

- (Algeria) Ali Meçabih
- (Algeria) Brahim Ouahid
- (Algeria) Abdelhafid Tasfaout
- (Angola) Bodunha
- (Burkina Faso) Romeo Kambou
- (Cameroon) Samuel Eto'o
- (Cameroon) Marc-Vivien Foé
- (Cameroon) Bernard Tchoutang
- (Republic of the Congo) Walter Bakouma
- (Egypt) Abdel Sattar Sabry
- (Egypt) Mido
- (Guinea) Souleymane Youla
- (Liberia) Kelvin Sebwe
- (Liberia) George Weah
- (Liberia) Christopher Wreh
- (Libya) Khaled Elfallah
- (Libya) Mutaz Kablan
- (Malawi) Patrick Mabedi
- (Malawi) Daniel Chitsulo
- (Nigeria) Tijani Babangida
- (Nigeria) Jay-Jay Okocha
- (Nigeria) Yakubu
- (Senegal) Pape Thiaw
- (South Africa) Shaun Bartlett
- (South Africa) Delron Buckley
- (Sudan) Khalid Bakhit
- (Togo) Koffi Kossi
- (Tunisia) Khaled Badra
- (Zambia) Rotson Kilambe
- (Zambia) Charles Lota
- (Zambia) Jones Mwewa

1 goal

- (Algeria) Fares Aouni
- (Algeria) Djamel Belmadi
- (Algeria) Yacine Bezzaz
- (Algeria) Rafik Saïfi
- (Algeria) Fadel Settara
- (Angola) Sebastião Gilberto
- (Angola) Quinzinho
- (Angola) Zico
- (Burkina Faso) Moumouni Dagano
- (Burkina Faso) Brahima Korbeogo
- (Burkina Faso) Alain Nana
- (Burkina Faso) Amadou Touré
- (Burkina Faso) Harouna Traoré
- (Burkina Faso) Narcisse Yaméogo
- (Burkina Faso) Mamadou Zongo
- (Cameroon) Patrice Abanda
- (Cameroon) Lauren
- (Cameroon) Pius Ndiefi
- (Republic of the Congo) Christ Bongo
- (Republic of the Congo) Edson Minga
- (Democratic Republic of the Congo) Mawa Inunu
- (Democratic Republic of the Congo) Papi Kimoto
- (Democratic Republic of the Congo) Kanika Matondo
- (Democratic Republic of the Congo) Jason Mayélé
- (Democratic Republic of the Congo) Kanku Mulekelayi
- (Democratic Republic of the Congo) Bolombo Tokala
- (Democratic Republic of the Congo) Ngidi Yemweni
- (Egypt) Abdel-Zaher El-Saqqa
- (Egypt) Ibrahim Said
- (Egypt) Mohamed Salah Abo Greisha
- (Ghana) Ishmael Addo
- (Ghana) Charles Akonnor
- (Ghana) Kwame Ayew
- (Ghana) Isaac Boakye
- (Ghana) Emmanuel Duah
- (Ghana) Emmanuel Osei Kuffour
- (Ghana) Yaw Preko
- (Guinea) Sambégou Bangoura
- (Guinea) Titi Camara
- (Guinea) Sékou Dramé
- (Guinea) Pascal Feindouno
- (Guinea) Abdoulaye Kapi Sylla
- (Ivory Coast) Tchiressoua Guel
- (Ivory Coast) Bonaventure Kalou
- (Ivory Coast) Fadel Keïta
- (Ivory Coast) Kandia Traoré
- (Ivory Coast) Gilles Yapi Yapo
- (Ivory Coast) Zéphirin Zoko
- (Liberia) Oliver Makor
- (Liberia) Zizi Roberts
- (Liberia) Frank Seator
- (Liberia) Musa Shannon
- (Libya) Rajab Elharbi
- (Libya) Khalifa Khalifa
- (Libya) Jehad Muntasser
- (Madagascar) Ruphin Menakely
- (Madagascar) Jean-Yves Randriamarozaka
- (Madagascar) Harry Randrianaivo
- (Madagascar) Etienne Rasoanaivo
- (Madagascar) Nathalie Suiverstin
- (Malawi) John Maduka
- (Morocco) Gharib Amzine
- (Morocco) Rachid Benmahmoud
- (Morocco) Mustapha Hadji
- (Morocco) Rachid Rokki
- (Namibia) Erastus Gariseb
- (Namibia) Patrick Mkontwana
- (Namibia) Razundara Tjikuzu
- (Nigeria) Julius Aghahowa
- (Nigeria) Benedict Akwuegbu
- (Senegal) Henri Camara
- (Senegal) Pape Seydou Diop
- (Senegal) Khalilou Fadiga
- (Senegal) Moussa N'Diaye
- (Sierra Leone) Mahmadu Alphajor Bah
- (Sierra Leone) Sidique Mansaray
- (South Africa) Bradley August
- (South Africa) Matthew Booth
- (South Africa) Phil Masinga
- (South Africa) Benni McCarthy
- (South Africa) Siyabonga Nomvethe
- (South Africa) Sibusiso Zuma
- (Sudan) Mujahid Ahmed
- (Sudan) Edward Jildo
- (Sudan) Khalid Ahmed Elmustafa
- (Togo) Eric Akoto
- (Togo) Komlan Amewou
- (Togo) Komlan Assignon
- (Togo) Zanzan Atte-Oudeyi
- (Togo) Sherif Touré Coubageat
- (Togo) Jérôme Doté
- (Togo) Alfa Potowabawi
- (Togo) Moustapha Salifou
- (Tunisia) Kaies Ghodhbane
- (Tunisia) Riadh Jelassi
- (Tunisia) Maher Kanzari
- (Zambia) Dadley Fichite
- (Zambia) Chalwe Kunda
- (Zambia) Harry Milanzi
- (Zambia) Andrew Sinkala
- (Zambia) Elijah Tana
- (Zimbabwe) Benjani Mwaruwani
- (Zimbabwe) Edzai Kasinauyo
- (Zimbabwe) Blessing Makunike
- (Zimbabwe) Master Masiku

1 own goal

- (Madagascar) Patrick Ranaivoson (against Congo)
