= Angola national football team results (2000–2019) =

- Win Draw Loss

This is a list of the Angola national football team results from 2000 to 2019.

== 2000 ==
9 April 2000 2002 WCQ (1 phase)	Swaziland	0–1	Angola	Somhlolo National Stadium, Lobamba
15:00 (UTC+2)		Report	Edson 55'	Attendance: 8,600; Referee: Walter Mochubela (South Africa)

23 April 2000	Angola	7–1	Swaziland	Estádio da Cidadela, Luanda
16:00 (UTC+1)	Hélder Vicente 18'; Joni 26'; Paulão 29', 72'; Isaac 35', 88'; Covilhã 85'	Report	Dlamini 79'	Attendance: 50,000; Referee: Edwin Senai (Botswana)

20 May 2000 2000 COSAFA Cup (Quarter-final)	Malawi	0-0 (pen 4-5)	Angola	Chichiri Stadium

18 June 2000	Angola	2–1	Zambia	Estádio da Cidadela, Luanda
15:30 UTC+01	Akwá 76', 78'	Report	Sinkala 35'	Attendance: 50,000; Referee: Petros Mathabela (South Africa)

2 July 2000	Equatorial Guinea	0–1	Angola	Estadio La Paz, Malabo
			Isaac 72'

9 July 2000	Cameroon	3–0	Angola	Stade Ahmadou Ahidjo, Yaoundé
15:00 UTC+01	Abanda 18'; Tchoutang 68', 75'	Report		Attendance: 25,000; Referee: Mohamed Guezzaz (Morocco)

16 July 2000	Angola	4–1	Equatorial Guinea	Estádio da Cidadela, Luanda
	Paulão 14'; Akwá 18'; Mendonça 83'; Isaac 88'		Mba 33'	Attendance: 20,000

23 July 2000 2000 COSAFA Cup (Semi-finals)	Lesotho	2-1	Angola	Setsoto Stadium
	Motlatsi Maseela 84'; Teele Ntsonyana 89'		Akwá 30'

3 September 2000	Burundi	0–0	Angola	Prince Louis Rwagasore Stadium, Bujumbura
				Attendance: 10,000

8 October 2000	Angola	2–2	Algeria	Estádio da Cidadela, Luanda
	P.Sousa 52'; Mendonça 66'		Tasfaout 10', 26'	Referee: Gilbert Njike (Cameroon)

== 2001 ==
13 January 2001	Burkina Faso	1–0	Angola	Stade du 4 Août, Ouagadougou
	Zongo 38'			Attendance: 25,000; Referee: Falla Ndoye (Senegal)

28 January 2001	Angola	3–1	Libya	Estádio da Cidadela, Luanda
15:30 UTC+01	Bodunha 48', 51'; Akwá 75'	Report	Jehad Muntasser 17'	Attendance: 55,000; Referee: Felix Tangawarima (Zimbabwe)

11 March 2001	Togo	1–1	Angola	Stade de Kégué, Lomé
16:00 UTC+0	Coubageat 63'	Report	Akwá 67'	Attendance: 3,000; Referee: Chukwudi Chukwujekwu (Nigeria)

25 March 2001	Angola	2–0	Burkina Faso	Estádio da Cidadela, Luanda
	Quinzinho 44'; Akwá 75'			Attendance: 25,000; Referee: Falla Ndoye (Senegal)

21 April 2001	Zambia	1–1	Angola	Nchanga Stadium, Chingola
15:00 UTC+2	Lota 46'	Report	Gilberto 18'	Attendance: 15,000; Referee: Isaack Abdulkadir (Tanzania)

6 May 2001	Angola	2–0	Cameroon	Estádio da Cidadela, Luanda
15:30 UTC+01	Akwá 60'; Quinzinho 69'	Report		Attendance: 40,000; Referee: Robin Williams (South Africa)

1 June 2001	Algeria	3–2	Angola	19 May Stadium, Annaba
	Saïfi 6', 41' (pen.); Kherkhache 80'		Quinzinho 29'; Joni 60'	Attendance: 25,000; Referee: Mohamed Guezzaz (Morocco)

17 June 2001	Angola	2–1	Burundi	Estádio Municipal do Tafe, Cabinda
	Paulão 25'; Flávio 52'		Ndikumana 50'	Attendance: 10,000

29 June 2001	Libya	1–1	Angola	June 11 Stadium, Tripoli
18:00 UTC+02	Elharbi 35'	Report	Zico 90'	Attendance: 2,000; Referee: Lucien Bouchardeau (Niger)

29 July 2001	Angola	1–1	Togo	Estádio da Cidadela, Luanda
15:30 UTC+01	Akwá 26'	Report	Alfa 29'	Attendance: 5,626; Referee: Felix Tangawarima (Zimbabwe)

14 November 2001 Friendly	Portugal	5-1	Angola	Estádio José Alvalade, Lisbon
	Figo 26' (pen.); Nuno Gomes 36', 66'; Jorge Andrade 39'; Boa Morte 49'		Mendonça 1'	Attendance: 5,000; Referee: Pascal Garibian (France)

== 2002 ==
15 January 2002 Friendly	South Africa	1–0	Angola	South Africa
	Benni McCarthy 42'			Stadium: Mmabatho Stadium

18 May 2002 2002 COSAFA Cup (Quarter-final)	Malawi	2-1	Angola	Chichiri Stadium, Malawi
	Essau Kanyenda 9'; Fernando Pereira 37' (o.g.)		Peter Mponda 51' (o.g.)

28 May 2002 Friendly not official	(Portugal) FC Porto	2-1	Angola	Estádio das Antas, Porto, Portugal
	Kali 14' (o.g.); Pena 19'		Akwá 41' (pen.)	Attendance: 10,000; Referee: Paulo Paraty

25 June 2002 Friendly	Mozambique	1–1	Angola	Estádio do Maxaquene, Maputo, Mozambique
	Marcos		Akwá

25 August 2002 Friendly	Angola	1–0	Gabon	Angola
	Sidónio Malamba			Stadium: Estádio da Cidadela

8 September 2002 2004 Africa Cup of Nations qualification	Angola	0–0	Nigeria	Estádio da Cidadela, Luanda
				Attendance: 10,000; Referee: Petros Mathabela (South Africa)

12 October 2002	Malawi	1–0	Angola	Civo Stadium, Lilongwe
	Mwafulirwa 85'			Attendance: 40,000; Referee: Felix Tangawarima (Zimbabwe)

== 2003 ==
29 March 2003 Friendly	Angola	1–1	Algeria	Angola
	Gilberto 5' (pen.)		Nassim Akrour 85'

31 May 2003 Friendly	Gabon	1–1	Angola	Gabon
	Mbanangoyé 31'		Chinho 56'	Stadium: Stade Omar Bongo

21 June 2003 2004 Africa Cup of Nations qualification	Nigeria	2–2	Angola	Samuel Ogbemudia Stadium, Benin City
	Kalu Uche 57'; Odemwingie 62' (pen.)		Figueiredo 9'; Akwá 55'

6 July 2003 2004 Africa Cup of Nations qualification	Angola	5–1	Malawi	Estádio da Cidadela, Luanda
	Msowoya 2'; Akwá 3'; Flávio Amado 33'; Stopirra 76'; Chinho 89'		Mgangira 78'	Attendance: 10,000

20 August 2003 Friendly	Angola	0–2	DR Congo	Angola
			Massard 46'; Mbotale 52'

7 September 2003 Friendly	Angola	2–0	Namibia	Angola
	Luís Delgado 44'; Flávio Amado 63'			Stadium: Estádio da Cidadela

20 September 2003 Friendly	Namibia	1–3	Angola	Namibia
	Johannes Hindjou 4'		Akwá 80'; Jaburú; Lopes	Stadium: Independence Stadium

12 October 2003	Chad	3–1	Angola	Stade Omnisports Idriss Mahamat Ouya, N'Djamena
15:30 UTC+01:00	Oumar 53', 74', 83'	Report	Bruno Mauro 49'	Attendance: 30,000; Referee: Monetchet Nahi (Ivory Coast)

16 November 2003	Angola	2–0	Chad	Estádio da Cidadela, Luanda
16:00 UTC+01:00	Akwá 42'; Bruno Mauro 57'	Report		Attendance: 30,000; Referee: Buenkadila Wabelo Bisingu (DR Congo)

== 2004 ==
31 March 2004 Friendly	Morocco	3–1	Angola	Morocco
			Maurito 84'

28 April 2004 Friendly	Ghana	1–1	Angola	Ghana
			Fonana 55'

23 May 2004 Friendly	DR Congo	1–3	Angola	Democratic Republic of the Congo

5 June 2004	Algeria	0–0	Angola	Stade 19 Mai 1956, Annaba
19:00		(Report)		Attendance: 55,000; Referee: Mourad Daami (Tunisia)

20 June 2004	Angola	1–0	Nigeria	Estádio da Cidadela, Luanda
15:30	Akwá 84'	(Report)		Attendance: 40,000; Referee: Aaron Nkole (Zambia)

3 July 2004	Gabon	2–2	Angola	Stade Omar Bongo, Libreville
16:00	Issiémou 44'; T. Nguema 49'	(Report)	Akwá 19'; Marco Paulo 81'	Attendance: 20,000; Referee: René Louzaya (Congo)

5 September 2004	Angola	1–0	Rwanda	Estádio da Cidadela, Luanda
15:30	Freddy 52'	(Report)		Attendance: 30,000; Referee: Jerome Damon (South Africa)

10 October 2004	Angola	1–0	Zimbabwe	Estádio da Cidadela, Luanda
15:30	Flávio 53'	(Report)		Attendance: 17,000; Referee: Verson Lwanja (Malawi)

== 2005 ==
23 February 2005 Friendly	Congo	0–2	Angola	Congo
			Flávio 43'; Zé Kalanga 74'

27 March 2005	Zimbabwe	2–0	Angola	National Sports Stadium, Harare
15:00	Kaondera 59'; Benjani 73'	(Report)		Attendance: 40,894; Referee: Coffi Codjia (Benin)

27 May 2005 Friendly	Tunisia	4–1	Angola	Tunisia
	Ali Zitouni 20', 69'; Imed Mhadhebi 51', 89'		Flávio Amado	Stadium: Stade de Radès

5 June 2005	Angola	2–1	Algeria	Estádio da Cidadela, Luanda
15:30	Flávio 50'; Akwá 58'	(Report)	Boutabout 63'	Attendance: 27,000; Referee: Jean-Marie Hicuburundi (Burundi)

18 June 2005	Nigeria	1–1	Angola	Sani Abacha Stadium, Kano
16:00	Okocha 5'	(Report)	Figueiredo 60'	Attendance: 17,000; Referee: Essam Abdel-Fatah (Egypt)

9 August 2005 Friendly	Angola	0–0	Botswana	South Africa

4 September 2005	Angola	3–0	Gabon	Estádio da Cidadela, Luanda
15:00	Nsi-Akoue 25' (o.g.); Mantorras 44'; Zé Kalanga 89'	(Report)		Attendance: 35,000; Referee: Koman Coulibaly (Mali)

8 October 2005	Rwanda	0–1	Angola	Amahoro Stadium, Kigali
16:00		(Report)	Akwá 79'	Attendance: 25,000; Referee: Mohamed Guezzaz (Morocco)

== 2006 ==
21 January 2006	Cameroon	3–1	Angola	Cairo Military Academy Stadium, Cairo
17:15	Eto'o 20', 39', 78'		Flávio 31' (pen.)	Attendance: 8,000; Referee: Mohamed Guezzaz (Morocco)

25 January 2006	Angola	0–0	DR Congo	Cairo Military Academy Stadium, Cairo
17:15				Attendance: 2,000; Referee: Badara Diatta (Senegal)

29 January 2006	Angola	3–2	Togo	Cairo International Stadium, Cairo
19:00	Flávio 9', 38'; Maurito 86'		Kader 24'; Cherif Touré 67'	Attendance: 4,000; Referee: Abderrahim Al-Arjoune (Morocco)

30 May 2006 Friendly	Argentina	2–0	Angola	Italy
	Maxi Rodríguez 29'; Juan Pablo Sorín 36'			Stadium: Stadio Arechi, Salerno; Attendance: 4000; Referee: Stefano Farina

2 June 2006 Friendly	Turkey	3–2	Angola	Netherlands
	Necati Ates 53'; Nihat Kahveci 71'; Hamit Altintop 84'		Akwá 31'; Love Cabungula 83'	Stadium: Furtuna Sittard Stadion; Attendance: 12,000; Referee: Jan Wegereet

5 June 2006 Friendly	United States	1–0	Angola	Germany
	Brien McBride			Attendance: 0

11 June 2006 2006 World Cup	Angola	0–1	Portugal	FIFA WM Stadion Köln, Cologne
21:00		Report	Pauleta 4'	Attendance: 45,000; Referee: Jorge Larrionda (Uruguay)

16 June 2006 2006 World Cup	Mexico	0–0	Angola	FIFA WM Stadion Hannover, Hanover
21:00		Report		Attendance: 43,000; Referee: Shamsul Maidin (Singapore)

21 June 2006 2006 World Cup	Iran	1–1	Angola	Zentralstadion, Leipzig
16:00	Bakhtiarizadeh 75'	Report	Flávio 60'	Attendance: 38,000; Referee: Mark Shield (Australia)

18 November 2006 Friendly	Tanzania	1–1	Angola	Tanzania
	Mwaikimba 27'		Manucho Gonçalves 71'	Stadium: Uhuru Stadium

3 September 2006	Swaziland	0–2	Angola	Somhlolo National Stadium, Lobamba
			Jamba 21'; Locó 80'

8 October 2006	Angola	3–1	Kenya	Estadio Nacional da Cidadela Desportiva, Luanda
	Flávio 27', 68'; Mateus 60'		Ambani 81'

== 2007 ==
25 March 2007 2008 Africa Cup of Nations qualification	Angola	6–1	Eritrea	Estadio Nacional da Cidadela Desportiva, Luanda
	Flávio 26', 69'; Mantorras 35'; Zé Kalanga 41'; Mendonça 51'; Figueiredo 80'		Tenese Gay 58'

4 April 2007 Friendly	Angola	0–0	Congo	Angola

2 June 2007 2008 Africa Cup of Nations qualification	Eritrea	1–1	Angola	Asmara Stadium, Asmara
	Abubeker 17'		Maurito 88'

17 June 2007 2008 Africa Cup of Nations qualification	Angola	3–0	Swaziland	Estadio Nacional da Cidadela Desportiva, Luanda
	Figueiredo 18'; Love 25'; Flávio 56'

22 August 2007 Friendly	DR Congo	3–1	Angola	Democratic Republic of the Congo
	Onoseke 7'; Jean-Jacques Yemweni 52'; Trésor Mputu 90'		Flávio Amado 33'

8 September 2007 2008 Africa Cup of Nations qualification	Kenya	2–1	Angola	Nyayo National Stadium, Nairobi
	Boya 18'; Oliech 87'		Manucho 35'

17 November 2007 Friendly	Angola	2–1	Ivory Coast	France
	André Macanga 12'; Flávio Amado 39'		Gilberto 63' (o.g.)	Stadium: Stade de Melun

20 November 2007 Friendly	Guinea	3–0	Angola	France
	Dianbobo Baldé 40'; Victor Correia 66'; Karamoko Cissé 78'

== 2008 ==
13 January 2008 Friendly	Angola	3–3	Egypt	Portugal
	Paulo Figueiredo 23'; Flávio Amado 38' (pen.); Manucho 23'		Emad Moteab 6', 24', 62'	Stadium: Complexo Desportivo de Alverca, Alverca

16 January 2008 Friendly	Morocco	2–1	Angola	Morocco
	Aboucherouane 51'; Maroane Chamakh 45'		Flávio Amado 17'

23 January 2008	South Africa	1–1	Angola	Tamale Stadium, Tamale
19:30	Van Heerden 87'	Report	Manucho 29'	Attendance: 15,000; Referee: Koman Coulibaly (Mali)

27 January 2008	Senegal	1–3	Angola	Tamale Stadium, Tamale
17:00	Diagne-Faye 20'	Report	Manucho 50', 67'; Flávio 78'	Attendance: 10,000; Referee: Modou Sowe (Gambia)

31 January 2008	Tunisia	0–0	Angola	Tamale Stadium, Tamale
17:00		Report		Attendance: 10,000; Referee: Coffi Codjia (Benin)

4 February 2008	Egypt	2–1	Angola	Baba Yara Stadium, Kumasi
17:00	Hosny 23' (pen.); Zaki 38'	Report	Manucho 27'	Attendance: 6,000; Referee: Yuichi Nishimura (Japan)

19 May 2008 Unofficial friendly	Benfica (Portugal)	3–2	Angola	Luanda, Angola
15:30 CET (UTC+01)	Rodríguez 2'; Job 66' (o.g.); Pereira 71'	Report	Love 26'; Amaro 90+3'	Stadium: Estádio da Cidadela; Attendance: 15,000

1 June 2008	Angola	3–0	Benin	Estádio dos Coqueiros, Luanda
15:30 UTC+1	Flávio 60'; Job 78'; Mendonça 84'	Report		Attendance: 6,000; Referee: Jerome Damon (South Africa)

8 June 2008	Niger	1–2	Angola	Stade Général Seyni Kountché, Niamey
16:00 UTC+1	Alassane 3'	Report	Flávio 29'; Yamba Asha 72'	Attendance: 23,000; Referee: Slim Jedidi (Tunisia)

14 June 2008	Uganda	3–1	Angola	Nelson Mandela National Stadium, Kampala
16:00 UTC+3	Ssepuuya 7'; Batabaire 19'; Wagaluka 75'	Report	Mantorras 90'	Attendance: 20,000; Referee: Eddy Maillet (Seychelles)

23 June 2008	Angola	0–0	Uganda	Estádio dos Coqueiros, Luanda
15:30 UTC+1 (Note: Match originally scheduled for 2008-06-22 postponed because the referees' flight was late.)		Report		Attendance: 7,500; Referee: Sule Mana (Nigeria)

20 August 2008 Friendly	Tunisia	1–1	Angola	Tunisia

7 September 2008	Benin	3–2	Angola	Stade de l'Amitié, Cotonou
16:00 UTC+1	Adénon 2'; Omotoyossi 52', 66'	Report	Flávio 12'; Locó 78'	Attendance: 30,000; Referee: Mohamed Benouza (Algeria)

12 October 2008	Angola	3–1	Niger	Estádio dos Coqueiros, Luanda
16:00 UTC+1	Daouda 53' (o.g.); Gilberto 68'; Zé Kalanga 73'	Report	Mallam 20'	Attendance: 3,200; Referee: Michel Gasingwa (Rwanda)

19 November 2008 Friendly	Venezuela	0–0	Angola	Venezuela

== 2009 ==
11 February 2009 Friendly	Mali	4–0	Angola	France
	Adama Coulibaly 15'; Mustapha Yatabaré 18'; Frédéric Kanouté 34'; Seidou Keita 65'			Stadium: Stade de Marville, Bois-Guillaume; Attendance: 2500

25 March 2009 Friendly	Cape Verde	1–0	Angola	Portugal
	Dady (pen.), 33'			Stadium: Estádio José Arcanjo, Algarve

31 March 2009 Friendly	Morocco	2–0	Angola	Portugal
	Adel Taarabt 9'; Marouane Chamack 50'			Stadium: Estádio do Restelo, Lisbon; Referee: Lucício Baptista

4 April 2009 Friendly	Angola	0–0	Namibia	Angola

14 June 2009 Friendly	Angola	0–0	Guinea	Portugal

12 August 2009 Friendly	Angola	2–0	Togo	Portugal
	Flávio Amado 55'; Mateus Galiano 73'			Stadium: Estádio do Restelo, Lisbon

5 September 2009 Friendly	Angola	1–1	Senegal	Portugal
	Kader Mangane 66' (o.g.)		Mamadou Niang 54'	Referee: Bruno Paixão

9 September 2009 Friendly	Angola	1–1	Cape Verde	Portugal
	Gilberto (pen.), 22'		Dário Fortado (pen.), 36'

10 October 2009 Friendly	Angola	2–1	Malta	Portugal
	Djalma 38'; André Macanga 63'		Andrew Cohen 14'	Stadium: Estádio Monte da Forea; Referee: Nuno Almeida

14 October 2009 Friendly	Angola	0–0	Cameroon	Portugal

14 November 2009 Friendly	Angola	1–1	Congo	Angola
	Flávio Amado 2'		Ladislas Douniamo 90+1'	Stadium: Estádio da Cidadela, Luanda; Attendance: 30,000

18 November 2009 Friendly	Angola	0–0	Ghana	Angola

30 December 2009 Friendly	Estonia	1–0	Angola	Portugal
	Kaimar Saag 79'

== 2010 ==
3 January 2010 Friendly	Angola	1–1	Gambia	Portugal

10 January 2010	Angola	4–4	Mali	Estádio 11 de Novembro, Luanda
20:00	Flávio 36', 42'; Gilberto 67' (pen.); Manucho 74' (pen.)	Report	Keita 79', 90+3'; Kanouté 88'; Yatabaré 90+4'	Attendance: 45,000; Referee: Essam Abdel-Fatah (Egypt)

14 January 2010	Angola	2–0	Malawi	Estádio 11 de Novembro, Luanda
19:30	Flávio 49'; Manucho 55'	Report		Attendance: 48,500; Referee: Desire Doue Normandiez (Ivory Coast)

18 January 2010	Angola	0–0	Algeria	Estádio 11 de Novembro, Luanda
17:00		Report		Attendance: 40,000; Referee: Jerome Damon (South Africa)

24 January 2010	Angola	0–1	Ghana	Estádio 11 de Novembro, Luanda
17:00		Report	Gyan 15'	Attendance: 50,000; Referee: Mohamed Benouza (Algeria)

3 March 2010 Friendly	Angola	1–1	Latvia	Angola

13 May 2010 Friendly	Mexico	1–0	Angola	United States

11 August 2010 Friendly	Uruguay	2–0	Angola	Portugal

4 September 2010	Uganda	3–0	Angola	Mandela National Stadium, Kampala
16:00 UTC+3	Obua 35'; Mwesigwa 58'; Sserunkuma 88'	Report		Referee: Samir Mahmoud Osman (Egypt)

9 October 2010	Angola	1–0	Guinea-Bissau	Estádio 11 de Novembro, Luanda
16:00 UTC+1	Gilberto 22' (pen.)	Report		Referee: Koman Coulibaly (Mali)

12 October 2010 Friendly	United Arab Emirates	0–2	Angola	United Arab Emirates

== 2011 ==
2 January 2011 Friendly	Iran	1–0	Angola	Qatar

4 January 2011 Friendly	Saudi Arabia	0–0	Angola	Saudi Arabia

26 March 2011	Kenya	2–1	Angola	Kasarani Stadium, Nairobi
16:00 UTC+3	Mohammed 57'; Mariga 90+1'	Report	Manucho 19'

5 June 2011	Angola	1–0	Kenya	Estádio 11 de Novembro, Luanda
15:30 UTC+1	Manucho 71'	Report

10 August 2011 Friendly	Liberia	0–0	Angola	Liberia

27 August 2011 Friendly	Angola	1–2	DR Congo	Angola

4 September 2011	Angola	2–0	Uganda	Estádio 11 de Novembro, Luanda
16:00 UTC+1	Manucho 57'; Flávio 70'	Report		Referee: Elahrach Bouchaib (Morocco)

8 October 2011	Guinea-Bissau	0–2	Angola	Estádio 24 de Setembro, Bissau
14:00 UTC±00:00		Report	Manucho 8'; Mateus 70'

14 December 2011 Friendly	Angola	1–1	Cameroon	Angola

18 December 2011 Friendly	Angola	1–0	Zambia	Angola

22 December 2011 Friendly	Angola	0–0	Namibia	Angola

== 2012 ==
11 January 2012 Friendly	Nigeria	0–0	Angola	Nigeria

14 January 2012 Friendly	Angola	3–1	Sierra Leone	Angola
	Manucho 15'; Mateus Galiano 39'; Flávio Amado 76'		Desmond Wellington 16'	Stadium: Estádio Nacional do Chiazi, Cabinda

22 January 2012 2012 Africa Cup of Nations group stage	Burkina Faso	1–2	Angola	Estadio de Malabo, Malabo
20:00	A. Traoré 58'	Report	Mateus Galiano 48'; Manucho 68'	Attendance: 17,000; Referee: Mohamed Benouza (Algeria)

26 January 2012	Sudan	2–2	Angola	Estadio de Malabo, Malabo
17:00	Bashir 32', 74'	Report	Manucho 4', 50' (pen.)	Attendance: 2,500; Referee: Ali Lemghaifry (Mauritania)

30 January 2012	Ivory Coast	2–0	Angola	Estadio de Malabo, Malabo
19:00	Eboué 33'; Bony 64'	Report		Attendance: 1,500; Referee: Slim Jedidi (Tunisia)

16 May 2012 Friendly	Angola	0–0	Zambia	Angola

29 May 2012 Friendly	Angola	0–0	Macedonia	Portugal

3 June 2012 2014 World Cup qualification	Angola	1–1	Uganda	Estádio 11 de Novembro, Luanda
16:00 UTC+1	Djalma 7'	Report	Okwi 88'	Attendance: 48,000; Referee: Gehad Grisha (Egypt)

10 June 2012 2014 World Cup qualification	Liberia	0–0	Angola	Antoinette Tubman Stadium, Monrovia
16:00 UTC±0		Report		Attendance: 15,000; Referee: Ali Lemghaifry (Mauritania)

15 August 2012 Friendly	Angola	2–0	Mozambique	Angola
	Dominique Kivuvu 49'; Manucho (pen.), 64'			Stadium: Estádio Nacional de Ombaka, Benguela

9 September 2012 2013 Africa Cup of Nations qualification (1st leg)	Zimbabwe	3–1	Angola	Rufaro Stadium, Harare
15:00 UTC+2	Mateus 4' (o.g.); Billiat 21'; Gutu 35'	Report	Djalma 56'	Referee: Hamada Nampiandraza (Madagascar)

14 October 2012 2013 Africa Cup of Nations qualification	Angola	2–0	Zimbabwe	Estádio 11 de Novembro, Luanda
16:00 UTC+1	Manucho 5', 7'	Report		Referee: Sylvester Kirwa (Kenya)

14 November 2012 Friendly	Angola	1–1	Congo	Portugal
	Yano 2'		Dzon Delarge 42'	Stadium: Estádio António Coimbra da Mota, Estoril

15 December 2012 Friendly	Angola	1–1	Gambia	Angola
	Amaro 10'		Saloum Faal 72'	Stadium: Estádio Nacional de Ombaka, Benguela

19 December 2012 Friendly	Angola	1–0	Cameroon	Angola
	Mabiná 55'			Stadium: Estádio Nacional da Tundavala, Huíla

22 December 2012 Friendly	Angola	1–0	Rwanda	Angola
	Mingo Bile 10'			Stadium: Estádio 11 de Novembro, Luanda

== 2013 ==
5 January 2013 Friendly	Angola	2–0	Zambia	South Africa
	Geraldo 8'; Amaro 85'			Stadium: Dobsonville Stadium, Soweto

13 January 2013 Friendly	Angola	2–0	Botswana	South Africa
	Guilherme 38'; Manucho 84'			Stadium: Dobsonville Stadium, Soweto

19 January 2013	Angola	0–0	Morocco	Soccer City, Johannesburg
21:00		Report		Attendance: 25,000; Referee: Badara Diatta (Senegal)

23 January 2013	South Africa	2–0	Angola	Moses Mabhida Stadium, Durban
17:00	Sangweni 30'; Majoro 62'	Report		Attendance: 40,000; Referee: Koman Coulibaly (Mali)

27 January 2013	Cape Verde	2–1	Angola	Nelson Mandela Bay Stadium, Port Elizabeth
19:00	F. Varela 81'; Héldon 90+1'	Report	Nando 33' (o.g.)	Attendance: 20,000; Referee: Slim Jedidi (Tunisia)

23 March 2013	Senegal	1–1	Angola	Stade du 28 Septembre, Conakry (Guinea) (Note: Senegal had to play their last two home matches in the World Cup qualifiers against Angola and Uganda at a neutral venue, due to a one-year ban from playing at their home stadium imposed by the CAF following riots in their 2013 Africa Cup of Nations qualification match against Ivory Coast.)
17:00 UTC±0	Sow 40'	Report	Amaro 75'	Attendance: 13,500; Referee: Néant Alioum (Cameroon)

8 June 2013	Angola	1–1	Senegal	Estádio 11 de Novembro, Luanda
16:00 UTC+1	Afonso 51'	Report	Cissé 23'	Attendance: 40,000; Referee: Bernard Camille (Seychelles)

15 June 2013	Uganda	2–1	Angola	Nelson Mandela National Stadium, Kampala
16:00 UTC+3	Okwi 83'; Mawejje 89'	Report	Job 57'	Attendance: 40,000; Referee: Rédouane Jiyed (Morocco)

7 September 2013	Angola	3–0; Awarded (Note: FIFA awarded Angola a 3–0 win as a result of Liberia fielding the ineligible player Nathaniel Sherman. The match originally ended 4–1 to Angola.)	Liberia	Tundavala National Stadium, Lubango
16:00 UTC+1	Guedes 2'; Mabululu 48'; Guilherme 61'; Abdul 64'	Report	Macauley 79'	Attendance: 3,000; Referee: Slim Jedidi (Tunisia)

== 2014 ==
6 September 2014	Gabon	1–0	Angola	Stade d'Angondjé, Libreville
17:00 UTC+1	Mbingui 44'	Report		Referee: Mahamadou Keita (Mali)

10 September 2014	Angola	0–3	Burkina Faso	Estádio 11 de Novembro, Luanda
17:00 UTC+1		Report	Bancé 43'; Pitroipa 49', 58'	Referee: Victor Gomes (South Africa)

10 October 2014	Lesotho	0–0	Angola	Setsoto Stadium, Maseru
19:30 UTC+2		Report		Referee: Kokou Fagla (Togo)

15 October 2014	Angola	4–0	Lesotho	Estádio 11 de Novembro, Luanda
17:00 UTC+1	Bastos 2'; Ary Papel 32'; Koetle 47' (o.g.); Love 68'	Report		Referee: Ali Adelaïd (Comoros)

15 November 2014	Angola	0–0	Gabon	Estádio 11 de Novembro, Luanda
16:00 UTC+1		Report		Referee: Tessema Bamlak (Ethiopia)

19 November 2014	Burkina Faso	1–1	Angola	Stade du 4-Août, Ouagadougou
18:00 UTC±0	Pitroipa 45' (pen.)	Report	Djalma 28' (pen.)	Referee: Youssef Essrayri (Tunisia)

== 2015 ==
13 June 2015	Angola	4–0	Central African Republic	Estádio Nacional da Tundavala, Lubango
15:30 UTC+1	Gelson 35', 63'; Dolly Menga 55' (pen.); Gilberto 89' (pen.)	Report		Referee: Duncan Lengani (Malawi)

21 June 2015	Swaziland	2–2	Angola	Somhlolo National Stadium, Lobamba
15:00 UTC+2	Tsabedze 65'; Ndzinisa 83'		Dário 30'; Ary Papel 54'	Referee: Emile Fred (Seychelles)

4 July 2015	Angola	2–0	Swaziland	Estádio 11 de Novembro, Luanda
15:30 UTC+1	Gelson 31', 86'			Referee: Lekgotla Leonard Johannes (Botswana)

6 September 2015	Madagascar	0–0	Angola	Mahamasina Municipal Stadium, Antananarivo
14:30 UTC+3		Report		Referee: José Rachide (Mozambique)

17 October 2015	South Africa	0–2	Angola	Rand Stadium, Johannesburg
15:00 UTC+2			Mateus 54'; Ary Papel 90+2'	Referee: Thierry Nkurunziza (Burundi)

24 October 2015	Angola	1–2	South Africa	Estádio 11 de Novembro, Luanda
15:00 UTC+1	Gelson 43'		Fabrício 29' (o.g.); Lakay 90'	Referee: Mbongisseni Fakudze (Swaziland)

13 November 2015	Angola	1–3	South Africa	Estadio Nacional de Ombaka, Benguela
15:30 UTC+1	Gelson 2'	Report (FIFA); Report (CAF)	Rantie 13'; Gabuza 20'; Jali 80' (pen.)	Attendance: 25,000; Referee: Bamlak Tessema Weyesa (Ethiopia)

17 November 2015	South Africa	1–0	Angola	Moses Mabhida Stadium, Durban
19:00 UTC+2	Manucho Diniz 66' (o.g.)	Report (FIFA); Report (CAF)		Attendance: 17,152; Referee: Davies Omweno (Kenya)

== 2016 ==
17 January 2016	Angola	0–1	Cameroon	Stade Huye, Butare
18:00		Report	Atouba 23'	Referee: Mahamadou Keita (Mali)

21 January 2016	DR Congo	4–2	Angola	Stade Huye, Butare
15:00	Munganga 8'; Meschak 18'; Bolingi 38'; Bokadi 82'	Report	Gelson 75'; Kimwaki 84' (o.g.)	Referee: Ali Lemghaifry (Mauritania)

25 January 2016	Ethiopia	1–2	Angola	Amahoro Stadium, Kigali
16:00	Tesfaye 74'	Report	Papel 54', 72'	Referee: Joseph Lamptey (Ghana)

26 March 2016	DR Congo	2–1	Angola	Stade des Martyrs, Kinshasa
15:30 UTC+1	Bakambu 23' (pen.); Meschak 78'	Report	Fredy 90+5' (pen.)	Referee: Joseph Lamptey (Ghana)

29 March 2016	Angola	0–2	DR Congo	Estádio 11 de Novembro, Luanda
17:00 UTC+1		Report	Kimwaki 44'; Bolingi 89'	Referee: El Fadil Mohamed (Sudan)

5 June 2016	Central African Republic	3–1	Angola	Barthélemy Boganda Stadium, Bangui
15:00 UTC+1	Mabidé 15'; Yamissi 38'; Limane 77'	Report	Pana 86'	Referee: Yakhouba Keita (Guinea)

3 September 2016	Angola	1–1	Madagascar	Estádio 11 de Novembro, Luanda
16:00 UTC+1	Gelson 54'	Report	Razakanantenaina 17'	Referee: Janny Sikazwe (Zambia)

== 2017 ==
25 March 2017 Friendly	Mozambique	2–0	Angola	Maputo, Mozambique
	Clésio 57'; Herenílson 73' (o.g.)	Report		Stadium: Estádio do Zimpeto; Referee: Thulani Sibandze (Swaziland)

28 March 2017 Friendly	South Africa	0–0	Angola	East London, South Africa
		Report		Stadium: Buffalo City Stadium; Attendance: 11,700; Referee: Joshua Bondo (Botswana)

10 June 2017	Burkina Faso	3–1	Angola	Stade du 4 Août, Ouagadougou
18:00 UTC+0	Bancé 21', 42' (pen.); B. Traoré 79'	Report	Gelson 23'	Referee: Mahmoud El Banna (Egypt)

16 July 2017	Mauritius	0–1	Angola	Stade Anjalay, Belle Vue Maurel
15:30 UTC+4		Report	Job 27' (pen.)	Referee: Thando Ndzandzeka (South Africa)

23 July 2017	Angola	3–2	Mauritius	Estádio 11 de Novembro, Luanda
16:30 UTC+1	Job 2'; Geraldo 44'; Vá 71'	Report	Pericots 12'; Édouard 45+1'	Referee: Nomore Murambiwa Musundire (Zimbabwe)

13 August 2017	Madagascar	0–0	Angola	Stade Municipal de Mahamasina, Antananarivo
14:30 UTC+3		Report		Referee: Ahmad Imtehaz Heeralall (Mauritius)

19 August 2017	Angola	1–0	Madagascar	Estádio 11 de Novembro, Luanda
16:30 UTC+1	Massunguna 68'	Report		Referee: Bamlak Tessema Weyesa (Ethiopia)

== 2018 ==
16 January 2018	Angola	0–0	Burkina Faso	Stade Adrar, Agadir
16:30		Report		Referee: Bamlak Tessema Weyesa (Ethiopia)

20 January 2018	Angola	1–0	Cameroon	Stade Adrar, Agadir
16:30	Job 30' (pen.)	Report		Referee: Maguette N'Diaye (Senegal)

24 January 2018	Congo	0–0	Angola	Stade Adrar, Agadir
19:00		Report		Referee: Mustapha Ghorbal (Algeria)

28 January 2018	Nigeria	2–1 (a.e.t.)	Angola	Stade Ibn Batouta, Tangier
16:30	Okpotu 90+2'; Okechukwu 109'	Report	Vá 56'	Referee: Sadok Selmi (Tunisia)

9 September 2018	Angola	1–0	Botswana	Estádio 11 de Novembro, Luanda
16:00 UTC+1	Gelson 30'	Report		Referee: Bakary Gassama (Gambia)

12 October 2018	Angola	4–1	Mauritania	Estádio 11 de Novembro, Luanda
16:00 UTC+1	Mateus 12' (pen.), 16'; Djalma 52'; Gelson 80'	Report	El Hacen 2'	Referee: Thierry Nkurunziza (Burundi)

16 October 2018	Mauritania	1–0	Angola	Stade Cheikha Ould Boïdiya, Nouakchott
17:00 UTC+0	Ba 17'	Report		Referee: Sadok Selmi (Tunisia)

18 November 2018	Angola	2–1	Burkina Faso	Estádio 11 de Novembro, Luanda
16:00 UTC+1	Mateus 45+1', 57'	Report	Dayo 69'	Referee: Jean-Jacques Ndala Ngambo (DR Congo)

== 2019 ==
22 March 2019	Botswana	0–1	Angola	Francistown Stadium, Francistown
19:00 UTC+2		Report	Eduardo 21'	Referee: Amin Mohamed Omar (Egypt)

8 June 2019 Friendly	Angola	2–0	Guinea-Bissau	Penafiel, Portugal
17:15 (UTC+1)	Brandão 72'; Mabululu 74'	Report		Stadium: Estádio 25 de Abril

24 June 2019	Tunisia	1–1	Angola	Suez Stadium, Suez
19:00	Msakni 34' (pen.)	Report	Djalma 73'	Attendance: 7,345; Referee: Bamlak Tessema Weyesa (Ethiopia)

29 June 2019	Mauritania	0–0	Angola	Suez Stadium, Suez
16:30		Report		Attendance: 10,120; Referee: Ibrahim Nour El Din (Egypt)

2 July 2019	Angola	0–1	Mali	Ismailia Stadium, Ismailia
21:00		Report	Haidara 37'	Attendance: 8,135; Referee: Redouane Jiyed (Morocco)

28 July 2019	Eswatini	1–1	Angola	Mavuso Sports Centre, Manzini
15:00 UTC+2	Sithole 88'	Report	Manguxi 50'	Referee: Tirelo Mositwane (Botswana)

3 August 2019	Angola	1–1 (4–5 p)	Eswatini	Estádio dos Coqueiros
20:30 UTC+1	Caranga 34'	Report	Tsabedze 56'	Referee: Nehemia Shoovaleka (Namibia)
	Penalties
	Caranga (penalty missed); De Paizo (penalty scored); Chico (penalty scored); Manguxi (penalty scored); Eddie (penalty missed); Coxe (penalty scored); Zé Panzo (penalty missed)		(penalty missed) Sithole; (penalty scored) M. Dlamini; (penalty scored) Shabangu; (penalty missed) #4; (penalty scored) Mkhonta; (penalty scored) Ndaba; (penalty scored) Vilakati

13 November 2019	Angola	1–3	Gambia	Estádio 11 de Novembro, Luanda
20:00 UTC+1	Eduardo 3'	Report	Ceesay 16', 17'; Marreh 89'	Referee: Osiase Koto (Lesotho)

17 November 2019	Gabon	2–1	Angola	Stade de Franceville, Franceville
20:00 UTC+1	Boupendza 27'; Bouanga 45'	Report	Yano 84'	Referee: Bernard Camille (Seychelles)
