= Dramé =

Dramé or Drame is a surname of West African origin. Notable people with the surname include:

- Adama Dramé (born 1954), Burkinabé percussionist
- Alioune Dramé (c. 1921–1977), Guinean economist and politician
- Boukary Dramé (born 1985), Senegalese footballer
- Hadji Dramé (born 2000), Malian footballer
- Hamed Dramé (born 2001), French footballer
- Ibrahima Dramé (born 2001), Senegalese footballer
- Issiar Dramé (born 1999), French footballer
- Khady Nani Dramé (born 1979), Senegalese molecular biologist
- Mamadou Drame (born 1954), Senegalese boxer
- Michaïlou Dramé (born 1992), Burkinabé footballer
- Ousmane Dramé (born 1992), French footballer
- Rahmatou Dramé (born 1985), Malian athlete
- Sékou Dramé (born 1973), Guinean footballer
- Tiébilé Dramé (1955–2025), Malian diplomat and politician
- Youba Dramé (born 1998), French footballer
