= Razafindrakoto =

Razafindrakoto is a surname of Malagasy origin that may refer to:

- Elysé Razafindrakoto (born 1974), retired Malagasy football defender
- Francette Razafindrakoto Harifanja, Malagasy politician
- Mamisoa Razafindrakoto (born 1974), Malagasy former footballer
- Victor Razafindrakoto (born 1972), Malagasy long-distance runner
