= Christ Bongo =

Republic of the Congo footballer (born 1976)

Personal information
- Full name: Christ Bongo-Zanoni
- Date of birth: 11 August 1976 (age 50)
- Place of birth: Kinshasa, Zaire
- Position: Striker

Senior career*
Years	Team	Apps	(Gls)
1996–1997	SV Wilhelmshaven	26	(6)
1997–1998	Hannover 96 II		
1998–1999	Gazélec Ajaccio		
1999	FC Aarau	4	(0)
1999–2000	FC Schaffhausen	10	(0)
2000–2001	FC Solothurn	6	(1)
2001–2002	FC Thun	4	(0)
2002	Prato	8	(0)
2003–2005	FC 105 Libreville		
2006–2008	Sporting Cabinda		

International career
1996–2001	Congo	12	(3)
- * Club domestic league appearances and goals

Christ Bongo-Zanoni (born 11 August 1976) is a Congolese former professional footballer who played as a striker. He played for SV Wilhelmshaven, Hannover 96, Gazélec Ajaccio, FC Aarau, FC Schaffhausen, FC Solothurn, FC Thun and FC 105 Libreville, and also represented the Republic of the Congo internationally.

== Club career ==
Bongo was born in Kinshasa, Zaire. His first European club was SV Wilhelmshaven of the Regionalliga Nord, the third tier of German football. In his single season at the club he made 26 league appearances, scoring six goals. Wilhelmshaven were involved in a struggle against relegation, but Bongo's goals, including a late winner against SV Lurup, helped the club to finish a single place above the relegation zone. During the 1997 close season Bongo joined another Regionalliga Nord side, Hannover 96, signing a three-year contract. His Hannover debut did not come until November, when he played in a 4–0 victory against Sportfreunde Ricklingen.

He continued his nomadic career in France and Switzerland with Gazélec Ajaccio and FC Aarau, before signing for FC Schaffhausen on a one-year contract in 2000. From there he moved to FC Solothurn, where he was top scorer, and scored the winner in a local derby against FC Grenchen. This proved to be his last goal for the club before moving on loan to FC Thun until the winter break.

In 2004, having returned to Africa with Gabonese club FC 105 Libreville, he scored against Cameroon's Bamboutos FC in the final of the Coupe de l'Uniffac, a competition contested by clubs from Central African countries, but finished on the losing side. Bongo's late equalising goal sent the match into extra time, but his team were defeated 6–5 in a penalty shootout.

Bongo signed for Sporting Cabinda in Angola in 2006 and retired in 2008.

== International career ==
Bongo was capped at international level by the Republic of the Congo national team. In January 2001 he scored in a World Cup qualifier against Tunisia, and was one of only three Congolese players to score in the qualifying tournament. The other were Edson Dico Minga and Walter Bakouma; in addition a Malagasy opponent scored an own goal.

== Career statistics ==
=== International ===
Appearances and goals by national team and year
National team	Year	Apps	Goals
Congo	1996	2	0
Congo	1997	3	1
Congo	1998	–	
Congo	1999	–	
Congo	2000	4	0
Congo	2001	3	2
Total		12	3

Scores and results list Congo's goal tally first, score column indicates score after each Bongo goal.

List of international goals scored by Christ Bongo
No.	Date	Venue	Opponent	Score	Result	Competition
1	12 January 1997	Stade Kamanyola, Kinshasa, Zaire	Zaire	1–0	1–1	1998 FIFA World Cup qualification
2	24 January 2001	Samuel Kanyon Doe Sports Complex, Paynesville, Liberia	Liberia	1–0	1–5	2002 Africa Cup of Nations qualification
3	28 January 2001	Stade Municipal, Pointe-Noire, Congo	Tunisia	1–1	1–2	2002 FIFA World Cup qualification
