= Nchanga (disambiguation) =

Nchanga is a mine in the Zambian town of Chingola. Nchanga might also refer to:

- Nchanga (constituency), Zambian parliamentary constituency of Chingola District
- Nchanga Rangers F.C., Zambian football club based in Chingola
- Nchanga Stadium, Zambian football stadium in Chingola
