= 2002 COSAFA Cup =

Tournament details
- Teams: 12 (from 1 confederation)

Final positions
- Champions: South Africa (1st title)
- Runners-up: Malawi

Tournament statistics
- Matches played: 12
- Goals scored: 29 (2.42 per match)

This page provides summaries to the 2002 COSAFA Cup.

== First round ==
Winners of the first round advanced to the quarter-finals.

16 March 2002

Mauritius	2–3	Madagascar
Mamisoa Razafindrakoto 14' (o.g.); Jean-Sebastien Bax 78'		Jean-Yves Randriamarozaka 17'; Elyse Razafindrakoto 44'; Francky Randrianasoloniaina 58'

Stade Anjalay, Pamplemousses
30 March 2002

Botswana	0–0 (4–5 pen.)	South Africa

Botswana National Stadium, Gaborone
7 April 2002

Lesotho	0–2	Mozambique
		Mavó 10'; Jossias 24'

Setsoto Stadium, Maseru
21 April 2002

Swaziland	2–1	Namibia
Mfanzile Dlamini 20' (pen.), 37'		Ruben Van Wyk 36'

Somhlolo National Stadium, Lobamba

== Quarter-finals ==
The four semi-finalists of the 2001 edition Angola (holders), Zimbabwe, Zambia and Malawi received byes to the quarter-finals.

5 May 2002

Zimbabwe	0–2	Swaziland
		Siza Dlamini 60'; Sibusiso Dlamini 80'

National Stadium, Harare
18 May 2002

Malawi	2–1	Angola
Essau Kanyenda 9'; Fernando Pereira 37' (o.g.)		Peter Mponda 51' (o.g.)

Chichiri Stadium, Blantyre
6 July 2002

Zambia	3–0	Mozambique
Rotson Kilambe 10', 57'; Chaswe Nsofwa 37'

Independence Stadium, Lusaka
21 July 2002

South Africa	0–0 (4–1 pen.)	Madagascar

Boet Erasmus Stadium, Port Elizabeth

== Semi-finals ==
10 August 2002

Malawi	1–0	Zambia
Essau Kanyenda 66' (pen.)

Chichiri Stadium, Blantyre
24 August 2002

South Africa	4–1	Swaziland
Teboho Mokoena 28', 64'; Jabu Pule 78' (pen.); Stanton Fredericks 89'		Siza Dlamini 57'

Peter Mokaba Stadium, Polokwane

== Final ==
21 September 2002

Malawi	1–3	South Africa
Patrick Mabedi 41' (pen.)		Patrick Mayo 42', 58'; Jimmy Kauleza 88'

Chichiri Stadium, Blantyre
28 September 2002

South Africa	1–0	Malawi
Benedict Vilakazi 90'

Kings Park Stadium, Durban

2002 COSAFA Cup

South Africa
First title
