= Senegal national football team results (2000–2009) =

This is a list of international football games played by the Senegal national football team from 2000 to 2009.

== Results ==
=== 2000 ===
13 January 2000 Friendly	Senegal	0–0	Cameroon

25 January 2000 2000 AFCON	Burkina Faso	1–3	Senegal

28 January 2000 2000 AFCON	Egypt	0–1	Senegal

2 February 2000 2000 AFCON	Zambia	2–2	Senegal

7 February 2000 2000 AFCON	Nigeria	2–1 (a.e.t.)	Senegal

9 April 2000 2002 World Cup qualification	Benin	1–1	Senegal

23 April 2000 2002 World Cup qualification	Senegal	1–0	Benin

6 May 2000 Friendly Tournament	Gambia	1–1	Senegal

8 May 2000 Friendly Tournament	Cape Verde	2–2	Senegal

11 May 2000 Friendly Tournament	Mali	2–2	Senegal

14 May 2000 Friendly Tournament	Cape Verde	1–0	Senegal

4 June 2000 Friendly	Senegal	0–0	Zambia

6 June 2000 Friendly	Senegal	0–0	Zambia

11 June 2000 Friendly	Tunisia	4–1	Senegal

16 June 2000 2002 World Cup qualification	Algeria	1–1	Senegal

9 July 2000 2002 World Cup qualification	Senegal	0–0	Egypt

24 September 2000 2002 AFCON Q	Senegal	0–0	Togo

8 October 2000 2002 AFCON Q	Guinea	1–0	Senegal

=== 2001 ===
13 January 2001 2002 AFCON Q	Uganda	1–1	Senegal

4 February 2001 Friendly	Senegal	1–0	Mali

24 February 2001 2002 World Cup qualification	Morocco	0–0	Senegal

10 March 2001 2002 World Cup qualification	Senegal	4–0	Namibia

24 March 2001 2002 AFCON Q	Senegal	3–0	Uganda

21 April 2001 2002 World Cup qualification	Senegal	3–0	Algeria

6 May 2001 2002 World Cup qualification	Egypt	1–0	Senegal

3 June 2001 Friendly	Gambia	0–0	Senegal

17 June 2001 2002 AFCON Q	Togo	1–0	Senegal

14 July 2001 2002 World Cup qualification	Senegal	1–0	Morocco

21 July 2001 2002 World Cup qualification	Namibia	0–5	Senegal

4 October 2001 Friendly	Senegal	2–0	Japan

8 November 2001 Friendly	South Korea	0–1	Senegal

26 December 2001 Friendly	Senegal	2–4	Burkina Faso

30 December 2001 Friendly	Senegal	1–0	Algeria

=== 2002 ===
20 January 2002 2002 AFCON	Egypt	0–1	Senegal

26 January 2002 2002 AFCON	Senegal	1–0	Zambia

31 January 2002 2002 AFCON	Senegal	0–0	Tunisia

4 February 2002 2002 AFCON	Senegal	2–0	DR Congo

7 February 2002 2002 AFCON	Nigeria	1–2 (a.e.t.)	Senegal

10 February 2002 2002 AFCON	Senegal	0–0 (a.e.t.) (2–3 p)	Cameroon

27 March 2002 Friendly	Senegal	2–1	Bolivia

14 May 2002 Friendly	Saudi Arabia	3–2	Senegal

23 May 2002 Friendly	Senegal	1–0	Ecuador

31 May 2002 2002 FIFA World Cup	France	0–1	Senegal

6 June 2002 2002 FIFA World Cup	Denmark	1–1	Senegal

11 June 2002 2002 FIFA World Cup	Senegal	3–3	Uruguay

16 June 2002 2002 FIFA World Cup	Sweden	1–2 (a.e.t.)	Senegal

22 June 2002 2002 FIFA World Cup	Senegal	0–1 (a.e.t.)	Turkey

8 September 2002 2004 AFCON Q	Lesotho	0–1	Senegal

12 October 2002 Friendly	Senegal	2–2	Nigeria

=== 2003 ===
12 February 2003 Friendly	Morocco	1–0	Senegal

30 March 2003 2004 AFCON Q	Gambia	0–0	Senegal

30 April 2003 Friendly	Tunisia	1–0	Senegal

31 May 2003 Friendly	Senegal	2–1	Cape Verde

7 June 2003 2004 AFCON Q	Senegal	3–1	Gambia

14 June 2003 2004 AFCON Q	Senegal	3–0	Lesotho

10 September 2003 Friendly	Japan	0–1	Senegal

10 October 2003 Friendly	Egypt	1–0	Senegal

15 November 2003 Friendly	Senegal	1–0	Ivory Coast

=== 2004 ===
18 January 2004 Friendly	Senegal	2–1	South Africa

26 January 2004 2004 AFCON	Senegal	0–0	Burkina Faso

30 January 2004 2004 AFCON	Senegal	3–0	Kenya

2 February 2004 2004 AFCON	Senegal	1–1	Mali

7 February 2004 2004 AFCON	Tunisia	1–0	Senegal

29 May 2004 Friendly	Guinea	1–1	Senegal

5 June 2004 2006 World Cup qualification	Senegal	2–0	Congo

13 June 2004 Friendly	Cape Verde	1–3	Senegal

20 June 2004 2006 World Cup qualification	Togo	3–1	Senegal

3 July 2004 2006 World Cup qualification	Senegal	1–0	Zambia

18 August 2004 Friendly	Ivory Coast	2–1	Senegal

5 September 2004 2006 World Cup qualification	Mali	2–2	Senegal

10 October 2004 2006 World Cup qualification	Liberia	0–3	Senegal

17 November 2004 Friendly	Senegal	2–1	Algeria

=== 2005 ===
9 February 2005 Friendly	Cameroon	1–0	Senegal

26 March 2005 2006 World Cup qualification	Senegal	6–1	Liberia

5 June 2005 2006 World Cup qualification	Congo	0–0	Senegal

18 June 2005 2006 World Cup qualification	Senegal	2–2	Togo

17 August 2005 Friendly	Ghana	0–0	Senegal

3 September 2005 2006 World Cup qualification	Zambia	0–1	Senegal

8 October 2005 2006 World Cup qualification	Senegal	3–0	Mali

=== 2006 ===
14 January 2006 Friendly	Senegal	0–0	DR Congo

23 January 2006 2006 AFCON	Zimbabwe	0–2	Senegal

27 January 2006 2006 AFCON	Ghana	1–0	Senegal

31 January 2006 2006 AFCON	Nigeria	2–1	Senegal

3 February 2006 2006 AFCON	Guinea	2–3	Senegal

7 February 2006 2006 AFCON	Egypt	2–1	Senegal

1 March 2006 Friendly	Senegal	2–1	Norway

23 May 2006 Friendly	South Korea	1–1	Senegal

16 August 2006 Friendly	Senegal	1–0	Ivory Coast

2 September 2006 2008 AFCON Q	Senegal	2–0	Mozambique

7 October 2006 2008 AFCON Q	Burkina Faso	1–0	Senegal

=== 2007 ===
7 February 2007 Friendly	Senegal	2–1	Benin

24 March 2007 2008 AFCON Q	Burkina Faso	4–0	Senegal

2 June 2007 2008 AFCON Q	Tanzania	1–1	Senegal

10 June 2007 Friendly	Malawi	2–3	Senegal

17 June 2007 2008 AFCON Q	Mozambique	0–0	Senegal

21 August 2007 Friendly	Ghana	1–1	Senegal

8 September 2007 2008 AFCON Q	Senegal	5–1	Burkina Faso

14 October 2007 Friendly	Senegal	3–1	Guinea

17 November 2007 Friendly	Senegal	3–2	Mali

21 November 2007 Friendly	Morocco	3–0	Senegal

=== 2008 ===
12 January 2008 Friendly	Senegal	3–1	Namibia

16 January 2008 Friendly	Senegal	2–1	Benin

23 January 2008 2008 AFCON	Tunisia	2–2	Senegal

27 January 2008 2008 AFCON	Senegal	1–3	Angola

31 January 2008 2008 AFCON	Senegal	1–1	South Africa

31 May 2008 2010 World Cup qualification	Senegal	1–0	Algeria

8 June 2008 2010 World Cup qualification	Gambia	0–0	Senegal

15 June 2008 2010 World Cup qualification	Liberia	2–2	Senegal

21 June 2008 2010 World Cup qualification	Senegal	3–1	Liberia

20 August 2008 Friendly	Libya	0–0	Senegal

5 September 2008 2010 World Cup qualification	Algeria	3–2	Senegal

11 October 2008 2010 World Cup qualification	Senegal	1–1	Gambia

22 December 2008 Friendly	Oman	1–0	Senegal

=== 2009 ===
28 March 2009 Friendly	Oman	2–0	Senegal

1 April 2009 Friendly	Iran	1–1	Senegal

12 August 2009 Friendly	Senegal	2–1	DR Congo

5 September 2009 Friendly	Angola	1–1	Senegal

9 September 2009 Friendly	China	0–0	Senegal

14 October 2009 Friendly	South Korea	2–0	Senegal
