= Jossias Macamo =

Retired Mozambican footballer

Personal information
- Full name: Andre Alberto Jossias Macamo
- Date of birth: 26 January 1976 (age 50)
- Place of birth: Mozambique
- Position: Midfielder

Senior career*
Years	Team	Apps	(Gls)
1997–2001	CD Costa do Sol		
2001–2003	Kaizer Chiefs F.C.		
2003–2005	Dynamos Giyani		
2005–2006	Moroka Swallows F.C.		
2006–2008	CD Costa do Sol		

International career
1997–2005	Mozambique	30+	(1)
- * Club domestic league appearances and goals

Jossias Macamo (born 26 January 1976) is a retired footballer from Mozambique. Following his playing career, he became involved with the CD Costa do Sol management team and also served as an Under-14 coach.

== Playing career ==
Macamo joined Kaizer Chiefs and wore the number 23 jersey, a number previously associated with Siyabonga Nomvethe until 2001. He made his debut during the Vodacom Challenge, scoring three goals in his initial three matches, and continued his strong performance with five goals in five subsequent games. Macamo formed a partnership with Lucky Maselesele and played a pivotal role in leading the team to the semi-finals of the BP Top 8 tournament, contributing a goal against Ria Stars. Notably, he was known for his unique goal celebration involving written messages. Macamo considers his time with the club to be the highlight of his career. During his tenure, he showcased prowess in aerial play as a left-footed player.

== International career ==
While with Kaizer Chiefs, Macamo received a call-up to represent Mozambique in the 2002 COSAFA Cup. In 2003, he was again summoned to play in a qualifier against Burkina Faso for the Africa Cup of Nations, a biennial international football competition.

== Honors ==
Macamo's accomplishments include:

- Winning the Vodacom Challenge in 2001.
- Securing the BP Top 8 title in 2001.
- Achieving victory in the Moçambola league in 2007.
- Capturing the Mozambique Cup in 2007.
