= Kanku Mulekelayi =

Democratic Republic of the Congo footballer (born 1980)

Personal information
- Date of birth: 1 April 1980 (age 46)
- Place of birth: Lubumbashi, Zaire
- Height: 1.68 m (5 ft 6 in)
- Position: Midfielder

Senior career*
| Years | Team | Apps | (Gls) |
| 1999–2003 | FC Saint-Éloi Lupopo | | |
| 2003–2004 | TP Mazembe | | |
| 2004–2006 | Ajax Cape Town F.C. | | |
| 2006–2010 | TP Mazembe | | |

International career^{‡}
| 1998 | Zambia | 2 | (1) |
| 2000–2004 | DR Congo | 16 | (2) |
- * Club domestic league appearances and goals as of 17 May 2016 ‡ National team caps and goals as of 17 May 2016

Kanku Mulekelayi (born 1 April 1980) is a retired footballer from DR Congo.

He played for the Zambia national team in 1998 under the name Matthews Kamwashi.|

Mulekelayi was a member of the DR Congo squad for the 2000 and 2002 Africa Cup of Nations.

Now Coaching in his native country Congo DRC

Father to four kids Named Matthew Jr Mulekelayi Kevin Mulekelayi, Johnathan Mulekelayi and the oldest Daughter, Ester Mulekelayi

== International career ==
=== International goals ===
Scores and results list DR Congo's goal tally first.

| No. | Date | Venue | Opponent | Score | Result | Competition |
|---|---|---|---|---|---|---|
| 1. | 17 June 2001 | Stade des Martyrs, Kinshasa, DR Congo | Zimbabwe | 2–1 | 2–1 | 2002 Africa Cup of Nations qualification |
| 2. | 29 July 2001 | Stade Félix Houphouët-Boigny, Abidjan, Ivory Coast | Ivory Coast | 2–1 | 2–1 | 2002 FIFA World Cup qualification |
