= Romeo Kambou =

Burkinabé footballer

Roméo Kambou
Personal information
- Date of birth: November 13, 1980 (age 45)
- Place of birth: Upper Volta
- Height: 1.80 m (5 ft 11 in)
- Position: Striker

Senior career*
Years	Team	Apps	(Gls)
1996–1998	USFA		
1998–2002	Bani Yas Club		
2002	Sarawak FA	21	(0)
2002–2003	Al-Wakra	41	(3)
2004–2005	Dhafra	22	(2)
2005–2008	Sarawak FA	35	(1)

International career
1997–2002	Burkina Faso	31	(4)
- * Club domestic league appearances and goals

Romeo Kambou (born 13 November 1980 in Upper Volta) is a Burkinabé international footballer, who last played as striker for Sarawak FA. He previously played for clubs in the United Arab Emirates and Qatar as well as in Burkina Faso.

== Career statistics ==
=== International ===
Scores and results list Burkina Faso's goal tally first, score column indicates score after each Kambou goal.

List of international goals scored by Romeo Kambou
No.	Date	Venue	Opponent	Score	Result	Competition
1	16 June 1996	Stade du 4 Août, Ouagadougou, Burkina Faso	Guinea	1–0	1–0	1998 Africa Cup of Nations
2	28 February 1999	Stade Prince Louis Rwagasore, Bujumbura, Burundi	Burundi	1–0	1–0	2000 Africa Cup of Nations qualification
3	9 July 2000	Stade du 4 Août, Ouagadougou, Burkina Faso	Guinea	1–1	2–3	2002 FIFA World Cup qualification
4	21 April 2001	Stade du 4 Août, Ouagadougou, Burkina Faso	Malawi	1–1	4–2	2002 FIFA World Cup qualification
