= Gilberto (footballer, born 1982) =

Angolan footballer (born 1982)

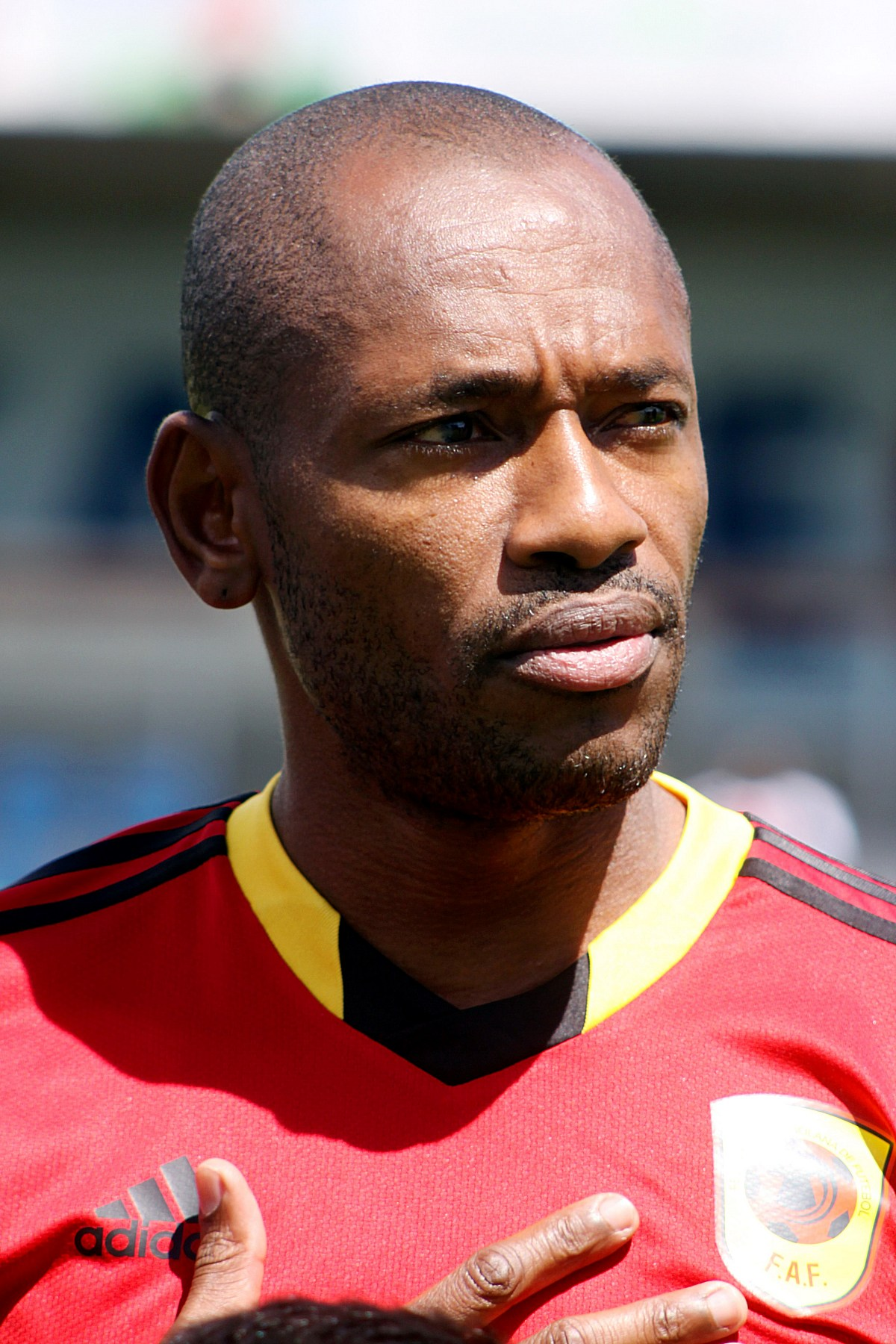
- Gilberto with Angola in 2014

Personal information
- Full name: Felisberto Sebastião da Graça Amaral
- Date of birth: 21 September 1982 (age 44)
- Place of birth: Luanda, Angola
- Height: 1.78 m (5 ft 10 in)
- Positions: Left winger; left midfielder

Youth career
- 2001–2002: Petro Atlético

Senior career*
Years	Team	Apps	(Gls)
2002–2010	Al Ahly	121	(7)
2010–2011	Lierse	29	(0)
2012–2013	AEL Limassol	16	(1)
2013–2015	Petro Atlético	23	(6)
2015	Benfica de Luanda	11	(2)
Total		365	(15)

International career
1999–2015	Angola	84	(10)
- * Club domestic league appearances and goals

Felisberto Sebastião da Graça Amaral, more commonly known as Gilberto (born 21 September 1982), is an Angolan former professional footballer who played as a left winger or left midfielder. He played professionally for Egypt's Al Ahly, Belgian club Lierse, Cypriot club AEL Limassol, and for Benfica de Luanda in his native country. He played for the Angola national team at international level, scoring 10 goals in 84 appearances.

== Club career ==
=== Al Ahly ===
While playing for Al Ahly in Egypt, Gilberto was well known for fitting into the team's tactic. The tactic was that Gilberto would run on the side of the pitch and then cross the ball at the end to Flavio who would score with a header. With Al Ahly, Gilberto played against many world class teams such as FC Barcelona and Roma. He helped his team to domestic success before helping them become the only team in the world to qualify to Club World Cup twice in a row.

=== 2015 incident and retirement ===
On 26 July 2015, during a match of Benfica de Luanda, Gilberto was knocked out following a tackle by an opponent from Progresso do Sambizanga. He subsequently remained unconscious for about twenty minutes, before being resuscitated by medical service and immediately carried to the hospital. A doctor stated that no injuries were detected in medical tests. Shortly afterwards, he announced his retirement as a player and that he was taking an office position with Benfica de Luanda.

== International career ==
An Achilles tendon injury made him miss the 2006 African Cup of Nations and the 2006 FIFA World Cup in Germany. He was part of the Angola national team during the 2008 African Cup of Nations in Ghana.

In the 2010 African Cup of Nations opening game against Mali on 10 January in Luanda Gilberto made assist for 1–0 lead to Flávio Amado in the first half. In the second half he scored from penalty-kick for Angola 3–0 lead and later in the game Seydou Keita penalised him for another penalty kick for Angola. Manucho scored for 4–0 but the match finished 4–4 after four consecutive goals for Mali in the last 15 minutes of the game.

== Career statistics ==
Appearances and goals by national team and year
National team	Year	Apps	Goals
Angola	1999	2	0
Angola	2000	2	0
Angola	2001	9	3
Angola	2002	3	0
Angola	2003	4	1
Angola	2004	6	1
Angola	2005	6	0
Angola	2006	1	0
Angola	2007	1	0
Angola	2008	11	1
Angola	2009	7	1
Angola	2010	8	2
Angola	2011	3	0
Angola	2012	4	0
Angola	2013	3	0
Angola	2014	9	0
Angola	2015	5	1
Total		84	10

Scores and results list Angola's goal tally first, score column indicates score after each Gilberto goal.

List of international goals scored by Gilberto
No.	Date	Venue	Opponent	Score	Result	Competition
1	21 April 2001	Nchanga Stadium, Chingola, Zambia	Zambia	1–1	1–1	2002 FIFA World Cup qualification
2	29 March 2003	Estádio da Cidadela, Luanda, Angola	Algeria	1–0	1–1	Friendly
3	23 May 2004	Stade des Martyrs, Kinshasa, DR Congo	DR Congo	1–0	3–1	Friendly
4	12 October 2008	Estádio dos Coqueiros, Luanda, Angola	Niger	2–1	3–1	2010 FIFA World Cup qualification
5	9 September 2009	Estádio Municipal de Albufeira, Albufeira, Portugal	Cape Verde	1–0	1–1	Friendly
6	10 January 2010	Estádio 11 de Novembro, Luanda, Angola	Mali	3–0	4–4	2010 Africa Cup of Nations
7	9 October 2010	Estádio 11 de Novembro, Luanda, Angola	Guinea-Bissau	1–0	1–0	2012 Africa Cup of Nations qualification
8	13 June 2015	Estádio Nacional da Tundavala, Lubango, Angola	Central African Republic	4–0	4–0	2017 Africa Cup of Nations qualification
