= Chaswe Nsofwa =

Zambian footballer (1978–2007)

- Nsofwa with Hapoel Be'er Sheva in 2007

Personal information
- Full name: Chaswe Ronald Nsofwa
- Date of birth: 22 October 1978
- Place of birth: Lusaka, Zambia
- Date of death: 29 August 2007 (aged 28)
- Place of death: Be'er Sheva, Israel
- Height: 1.79 m (5 ft 10 1/2 in)
- Position: Striker

Youth career
- Zanaco

Senior career*
Years	Team	Apps	(Gls)
1999–2002	Zanaco		
2002–2003	Krylia Sovetov	2	(0)
2002–2003	→ Krylia Sovetov II	4	(2)
2003–2004	Zanaco		
2004–2005	Green Buffaloes		
2005–2007	Telekom Malaysia		
2007	Hapoel Be'er Sheva	1	(2)

International career^{‡}
1999	Zambia U-20	3	(0)
2000–2006	Zambia	33	(9)
- * Club domestic league appearances and goals as of 3 September 2015 (UTC) ‡ National team caps and goals as of 3 September 2015 (UTC)

Chaswe Ronald Nsofwa (22 October 1978 – 29 August 2007) was a Zambian international footballer who played as a striker. He died during a training match in Be'er Sheva, Israel.

== Early life ==
Nsofwa was born on 22 October 1978 in Lusaka, Zambia.

== Career ==
=== International career ===
He was part of the Zambian African Nations Cup team in 2002. He also represented his country at the 1999 FIFA World Youth Cup in Nigeria.

=== Hapoel Be'er Sheva ===
During a trial in August 2007, Nsofwa scored two goals in two Toto Cup matches, prompting a signature. He was signed by Hapoel Be'er Sheva of the Israeli Liga Leumit though too late for the Israel Football Association to allow him to play in the club's first league match. After missing the first league round, he played his first match on 25 August 2007 against Hakoah Amidar Ramat Gan. His first start was a successful one as he scored two goals and received much praise from the local supporters.

== International goals ==
No.	Date	Venue	Opponent	Score	Result	Competition
1.	12 March 2000	Arthur Davies Stadium, Kitwe, Zambia	Malawi	1–1	1–1	Friendly
2.	25 March 2000	Independence Stadium, Lusaka, Zambia	Botswana	3–0	3–0	2000 COSAFA Cup
3.	1 April 2000	Independence Stadium, Lusaka, Zambia	Kenya	1–0	1–0	Friendly
4.	8 July 2000	Independence Stadium, Lusaka, Zambia	Togo	2–0	2–0	2002 FIFA World Cup qualification
5.	14 July 2001	Independence Stadium, Lusaka, Zambia	Cameroon	2–2	2–2	2002 FIFA World Cup qualification
6.	27 July 2001	June 11 Stadium, Tripoli, Libya	Libya	1–2	4–2	2002 FIFA World Cup qualification
7.	18 August 2001	Chichiri Stadium, Blantyre, Malawi	Angola	1–1	1–1 (2–4 p)	2001 COSAFA Cup
8.	21 November 2001	Addis Ababa Stadium, Addis Ababa, Ethiopia	Ethiopia	1–1	2–1	Friendly
9.	6 July 2002	Independence Stadium, Lusaka, Zambia	Mozambique	2–0	3–0	2002 COSAFA Cup
10.	8 September 2002	Al-Merrikh Stadium, Omdurman, Sudan	Sudan	1–0	1–0	2004 African Cup of Nations qualification
11.	1 November 2004	Police Officers' Club Stadium, Dubai, United Arab Emirates	Yemen	2–0	2–2	Friendly
12.	21 October 2006	Independence Stadium, Lusaka, Zambia	Angola	2–0	2–0	2006 COSAFA Cup

== Death ==
On 29 August 2007, Nsofwa suffered sudden heart failure during a training match against Maccabi Be'er Sheva at Vasermil Stadium. 40 minutes later, he was brought to Soroka Medical Center where he was declared dead on arrival.

He was buried on 6 September in his home country of Zambia at Lusaka's Old Leopards Hill cemetery. His funeral was attended by former president Frederick Chiluba as well as several members of the Zambian national squad. As a mark of respect, Hapoel Be'er Sheva have retired the number six shirt in his honour.

== See also ==
- List of footballers who died while playing

== Honours ==
Zanaco

- Premier League:
  - Winners: 2002–2003
- Mosi Cup:
  - Winners: 2002–2003

Green Buffaloes

- Mosi Cup:
  - Winners: 2004–2005
