= Emmanuel Duah =

Ghanaian retired professional footballer

Personal information
- Date of birth: 14 November 1976 (age 49)
- Place of birth: Kumasi, Ghana
- Height: 1.68 m (5 ft 6 in)
- Position: Winger

Senior career*
Years	Team	Apps	(Gls)
1991–1992	Neoplan Stars		
1992–1993	Torino	0	(0)
1993–1994	Standard Liège	1	(0)
1994–1995	Demirspor	19	(3)
1995–1996	Eskişehirspor	18	(0)
1996–1997	Mallorca	12	(2)
1997–2002	União Leiria	106	(29)
2002–2004	Gil Vicente	38	(3)
2004	Ovarense		
2004–2006	Nejmeh		
2006–2008	Hapoel Acre	24	(3)
Total		208	(40)

International career
1991–1993	Ghana U17	12	(4)
1993	Ghana U20	6	(2)
1994–2004	Ghana	28	(4)
1996	Ghana Olympic	4	(0)
- * Club domestic league appearances and goals

Emmanuel Duah (born 14 November 1976) is a Ghanaian former professional footballer who played as a winger.

== Club career ==
Duah was born in Kumasi, Ghana. After his exploits at the 1991 FIFA U-17 World Championship, 15-year-old Duah was bought by Serie A club Torino FC, alongside teammates Mark Edusei, Mohammed Gargo and Samuel Kuffour. He never appeared officially for the Italians, and also had a very difficult time at his following team, Standard Liège in Belgium.

After two years in Turkey with as many clubs, Duah joined RCD Mallorca in the Spanish second division, being used as the Balearic Islands side promoted to La Liga. His next stop – also in the second level – would be productive and steady, as he played five years with U.D. Leiria from Portugal, also attaining promotion in his debut season with a career-best 11 goals in only 18 games.

Duah was used regularly by Leiria in the following Primeira Liga campaigns, but only appeared in ten matches in 2001–02 (three goals) as the José Mourinho-led team qualified to the UEFA Intertoto Cup after finishing seventh. Subsequently, released he continued in the country, playing two seasons with Gil Vicente F.C. also in the top flight.

Duah closed out his career in 2008 at nearly 32, after two-year spells in Lebanon and Israel with Nejmeh and Hapoel Acre, respectively.

== International career ==
Duah was a member of Ghana's under-17 team that won the 1991 FIFA World Championship in Italy, scoring his only goal in the tournament in the final against Spain (1–0). In 1993 he was again essential as the under-20s reached the final, losing to Brazil.

A full international since the age of 18, Duah represented the nation at the 1996 Summer Olympics and the 2002 Africa Cup of Nations, exiting in the quarterfinals in the former competition.

== Career statistics ==
=== International ===
Scores and results list Ghana's goal tally first, score column indicates score after each Duah goal.

List of international goals scored by Emmanuel Duah
No.	Date	Venue	Opponent	Score	Result	Competition
1	4 September 1994	Accra Sports Stadium, Accra, Ghana	Sierra Leone	2–0	4–1	1996 Africa Cup of Nations qualification
2	27 March 1996	Teixeirão, São José do Rio Preto, Brazil	Brazil	2–5	2–8	Friendly
3	8 October 2000	Accra Sports Stadium, Accra, Ghana	Zimbabwe	2–0	4–1	2002 Africa Cup of Nations qualification
4	28 January 2001	Accra Sports Stadium, Accra, Ghana	Liberia	1–1	1–3	2002 FIFA World Cup qualification

== Honours ==
=== Club ===
Torino

- Coppa Italia: 1992–93

União de Leiria

- Segunda Liga: 1997–98

Nejmeh

- Lebanese Premier League: 2004–05
- Lebanese Elite Cup: 2004–05

=== International ===
Ghana U17

- FIFA U-17 World Championship: 1991

Ghana U20

- FIFA World Youth Championship: Runner-up 1993
