= Jones Mwewa =

Zambian footballer (1973-2011)

Personal information
- Full name: Jones Mwewa
- Date of birth: 12 March 1973
- Place of birth: Ndola, Zambia
- Date of death: 18 November 2011 (aged 38)
- Place of death: Kitwe, Zambia
- Position: Defender

Senior career*
Years	Team	Apps	(Gls)
1996–2002	Power Dynamos		
2004	Konkola Blades		

International career
1995–2002	Zambia		
- * Club domestic league appearances and goals

Jones Mwewa (12 March 1973 – 18 November 2011) was a Zambian footballer who was part of the Zambian squad that finished third in the 1996 African Cup of Nations.

== Career ==
Mwewa played club football for Railway Express Power Dynamos and Konkola Blades.

Mwewa made several appearances for the Zambia national football team, including 13 FIFA World Cup qualifying matches. He also participated for Zambia at the 2000 African Cup of Nations and the 2002 African Cup of Nations finals.

== Death ==
Mwewa died suddenly on 18 November 2011 at the age of 38.
