= Narcisse Yaméogo =

Burkinabé footballer

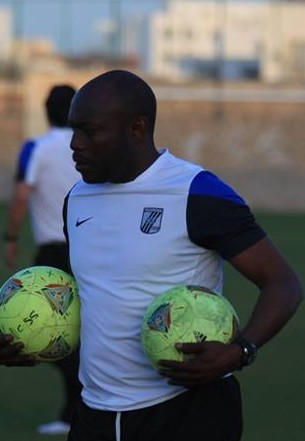

Personal information
- Date of birth: 19 November 1980 (age 45)
- Place of birth: Ouagadougou, Upper Volta
- Height: 1.72 m (5 ft 8 in)
- Position: Attacking midfielder

Youth career
- 1989–1991: Porto

Senior career*
Years	Team	Apps	(Gls)
1999–2001	ASFA Yennenga		
2001–2003	Jeanne d'Arc	42	(6)
2003–2004	Braga	4	(0)
2004–2006	Portimonense	23	(0)
2006–2007	Olhanense	24	(2)
2007–2008	Ribeirão	4	(0)
2008–2008	Riffa Club		
2008–2009	Portimonense	22	(4)
2009–2010	Mughan FK	28	(1)
2010–2011	União da Madeira	10	(2)
2011–2012	A.D. Camacha	15	(1)

International career
1999–2012	Burkina Faso	33	(5)
- * Club domestic league appearances and goals

Narcisse Yaméogo (born 19 November 1980) is a Burkinabé former professional footballer who played as an attacking midfielder.

== Club career ==
Born in Ouagadougou, Yaméogo began his career in his native Burkina Faso with ASFA Yennenga, before moving to Senegal with Jeanne d'Arc. He then moved to Portugal, where he spent the majority of his career, playing for Braga, Portimonense, Olhanense, Ribeirão, C.F. União and A.D. Camacha, with short spells in Bahrain with Riffa S.C. and Azerbaijan with Mughan FK.

Following his retirement from playing, Yaméogo was an assistant coach of Gabon under manager Paulo Jorge Rebelo Duarte. In April 2015, he was hired as an assistant coach of Club Sportif Sfaxien under manager Paulo Jorge Rebelo Duarte.

== International career ==
Yaméogo represented Burkina Faso, with which he made his international debut in 1999. He was part of the Burkinabé 2002 African Nations Cup and was recalled for 2010 African Cup of Nations.
