= Adama Dramé =

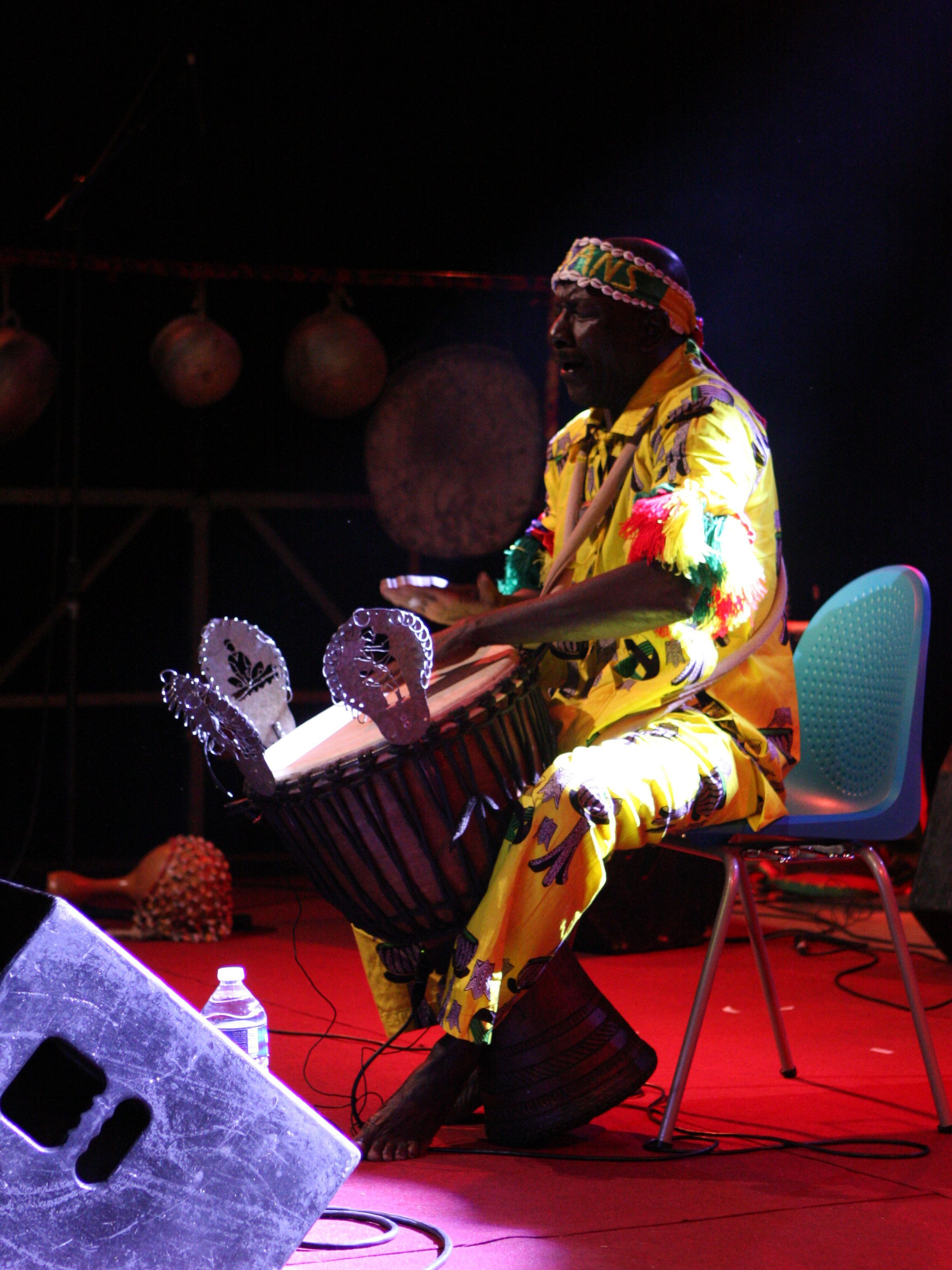
- Adama Dramé in concert, June 2016.

Adama Dramé (born June 7, 1954 in Nouna, Burkina Faso) is a Burkinabé percussionist.

== Biography ==
Adama Dramé was born in Nouna, Burkina Faso, on June 7, 1954, to a family of musicians and storytellers, guardians of tradition, known as djelis, referred to as griots in French. Of Mandinka culture, he became a musician at the age of twelve.

Since 1979, he has spread his knowledge of his instrument (the djembe) from Africa to Europe and America. These travels led him to open up to other cultures, other music, and especially to collaborate with European musicians such as Royal de Luxe, André Ceccarelli, Bernard Lubat, Marc Vella, the troupe Black Blanc Beur, and Les Percussions de Strasbourg. In 1990, after a solo career marked by collaborations, he created a large ensemble, Foliba, combining musicians, dancers, and singers.

== Discography (selection) ==
- 1987: Grands Maîtres De La Percussion / Great Masters Of Percussion, Auvidis.
- 1992: Continents, Indigo, with Marc Vella.
- 1993: Percussions mandingues, 2 volumes, Playa Sound.
- 2006: Anniversaire, Sunset France
- 2016: Dakan, Buda/Universal.
