= Massard =

Massard is a surname.

== List of people with the surname ==
- Albert Massard (1900–1968), Luxembourgian footballer
- Armand Massard (1884–1971), French fencer
- Janine Massard (born 1939), Swiss writer
- Jean Massard (1894–1930), Luxembourgian footballer
- Lydie Massard (born 1978), French politician
- Robert Massard (1925–2025), French opera singer
- Yves Massard (1923–1996), German-born French film actor

== See also ==
- Massad
- Battle of Massard Prairie
