= Abdoulaye Kapi Sylla =

Guinean footballer

Personal information
- Date of birth: September 15, 1982 (age 44)
- Place of birth: Kindia, Guinea
- Height: 1.71 m (5 ft 7 1/2 in)
- Position: Midfielder

Team information
- Current team: AS Yzeure

Senior career*
Years	Team	Apps	(Gls)
2000–2001	AS Angoulême		
2001–2004	Tours FC		
2004–2007	AS Moulins		
2007–2008	SN Imphy Decize		
2008–	AS Yzeure		

International career
2002–2004	Guinea	2	(0)
- * Club domestic league appearances and goals as of 20:01, 26 November 2009 (UTC)

Abdoulaye Kapi Sylla (born September 15, 1982, in Kindia) is a Guinean football player. Currently, he plays in the Championnat de France amateur for AS Yzeure. He played before for Club Industriel Kamsar, AS Angoulême and Tours FC.

He was part of the Guinean 2004 African Nations Cup team, who finished second in their group in the first round of competition, before losing in the quarter finals to Mali.
