= Mahmadu Alphajor Bah =

Sierra Leonean footballer (1977–2016)

Mahmadu Bah
Personal information
- Full name: Mahmadu Alphajor Bah
- Date of birth: 1 January 1977
- Place of birth: Freetown, Sierra Leone
- Date of death: 21 September 2016 (aged 39)
- Place of death: Freetown, Sierra Leone
- Height: 1.79 m (5 ft 10 1/2 in)
- Position: Midfielder

Senior career*
Years	Team	Apps	(Gls)
1994–1996	KSC Lokeren	15	(1)
1997–1998	Chunnam Dragons	30	(7)
1999–2003	Xiamen Lanshi	70	(6)
2004	Zhejiang Lücheng	21	(3)
2005	Halmstads BK	9	(0)
2005–2007	Al-Qadisiya		
2007–2008	Mighty Blackpool		
2008–2009	Al-Sailiya	4	(0)
2012	Perlis FA		

International career^{‡}
2000–2008	Sierra Leone	18	(2)
- * Club domestic league appearances and goals as of 7 October 2007 ‡ National team caps and goals as of 7 October 2007

Mahmadu Alphajor Bah (1 January 1977 – 21 September 2016) was a Sierra Leonean footballer who played mostly as an attacking midfielder.

== Club career ==
His clubs included Halmstads BK in Sweden, KSC Lokeren in Belgium, Chunnam Dragons in South Korea, Xiamen Lanshi and Zhejiang Lücheng in China, Al-Qadisiya in Saudi Arabia, and Perlis FA in Malaysia.

Alphajor Bah died in a traffic collision in Freetown on 21 September 2016 when the vehicle he was driving was hit by a truck coming from the opposite direction.

== International career ==
Alphajor Bah was a regular member of the Sierra Leone national team, known as the Leone Stars, between the years 2000 and 2008. He regularly played as an attacking midfielder or sometimes as a second striker for the Sierra Leone national team alongside striker Mohamed Kallon.

== Personal life ==
Alphajor Bah was a very religious Muslim and often publicly preached about Islam and the life of the Prophet Muhammad.
