= Jehad Muntasser =

Libyan footballer (born 1978)

Personal information
- Full name: Jehad Abdussalam Muntasser
- Date of birth: 26 July 1978 (age 48)
- Place of birth: Tripoli, Libya
- Height: 1.81 m (5 ft 11 1/2 in)
- Position: Attacking midfielder

Youth career
- Atalanta

Senior career*
Years	Team	Apps	(Gls)
1995–1997	Pro Sesto	62	(33)
1997–1998	Arsenal	0	(0)
1998–1999	Bristol City	0	(0)
1999	Empoli	0	(0)
1999–2000	Viterbese	23	(14)
2000–2001	Catania	16	(7)
2001–2002	L'Aquila	12	(7)
2002–2004	Triestina	41	(19)
2004–2005	Perugia	15	(8)
2005–2007	Treviso	13	(8)
2007–2008	Al-Wakra	15	(10)
2008–2011	Al-Ittihad Tripoli		

International career
1999–2006	Libya	21	(7)
- * Club domestic league appearances and goals

Jehad Abdussalam Muntasser (Arabic: جهاد المنتصر; born 26 July 1978) is a Libyan former football midfielder.

== Career ==
Muntasser started his career at Italian club Pro Sesto, before being signed by English Premier League club Arsenal in 1997. He made one brief appearance for Arsenal's first team, coming on in a match against Birmingham City on 14 October 1997. He was sold to Bristol City in January 1998 but was released by them on a free transfer in the summer of 1999 without playing a first-team game.

He returned to Italy and has since played for a string of Serie C and Serie B clubs—Viterbese (1999–2000), Catania (2000–2001), L'Aquila (2001–2002), Triestina (2002–2004), Perugia (2004–2005)—before joining newly promoted Serie A side Treviso in 2005. Treviso however were relegated on their first season back at the top, and started the 2006–07 season back in Serie B. He later signed for a Qatar club, Al-Wakra Sports Club, in January 2008 Jehad signed for 6 months for Al Ittihad of Libya. He was a member of the Libyan 2006 African Nations Cup team.

During the Libyan revolution of 2011 Jehad dedicated his time and resources to helping children affected by the conflict by putting together a charity fundraising football event named Friends of Libya's Children. The event brought together internationally renowned football stars such as Javier Zanetti, Fabio Cannavaro, Marco Materazzi, Pavel Nedved and many more that competed in a game hosted in Dubai and attended by Mustafa Abdul Jalil (at the time Libya's interim leader). The event was broadcast around the Arab region.

He is the grandson of Libyan prime minister Mahmud al-Muntasir.

He created The Victorious, a football talent show that aims at discovering the hidden talents in football among the Arab youths. The Victorious show has aired for two seasons on Dubai Channels Network, and preparations for the third season are ongoing.

== Career statistics ==
=== International ===
Appearances and goals by national team and year
National team	Year	Apps	Goals
Libya	1999	7	4
Libya	2000	2	1
Libya	2001	1	1
Libya	2002	2	1
Libya	2003	1	0
Libya	2004	1	0
Libya	2005	1	0
Libya	2006	4	0
Libya	2007	2	0
Total		21	7

Scores and results list Libya's goal tally first, score column indicates score after each Muntasser goal.

List of international goals scored by Jehad Muntasser
No.	Date	Venue	Opponent	Score	Result	Competition
1	23 August 1999	Amman International Stadium, Amman, Jordan	Syria	1–1	1–1	1999 Arab Games
2	27 August 1999	Amman International Stadium, Amman, Jordan	United Arab Emirates	1–0	1–0	1999 Arab Games
3	19 November 1999	Ajaylat Stadium, Ajaylat, Libya	Togo	?–?	2–1	Friendly
4	23 December 1999	March 28 Stadium, Benghazi, Libya	Gabon	2–0	2–0	1999 Great Artificial River Tournament
5	9 April 2000	June 11 Stadium, Tripoli, Libya	Mali	1–0	3–0	2002 FIFA World Cup qualification
6	28 January 2001	Estádio da Cidadela, Luanda, Angola	Angola	1–0	1–3	2002 FIFA World Cup qualification
7	8 September 2002	Misurata Stadium, Misurata, Libya	DR Congo	2–1	3–2	2004 Africa Cup of Nations qualification
