= Bradley August =

South African football

Personal information
- Full name: Bradley John August
- Date of birth: 24 September 1978 (age 48)
- Place of birth: Cape Town, South Africa
- Height: 1.81 m (5 ft 11 in)
- Position: Centre-forward

Senior career*
Years	Team	Apps	(Gls)
1995–1999	Hellenic	108	(29)
1999–2001	Lyngby	61	(15)
2001–2002	Santos	11	(3)
2002–2005	Ajax Cape Town	72	(9)
2005–2007	Maritzburg United	28	(3)
2007–2009	Ikapa Sporting	19	(6)
2009–2011	Vasco da Gama	40	(6)
Total		339	(71)

International career
2000–2002	South Africa	16	(2)
- * Club domestic league appearances and goals

Bradley John August (born 24 September 1978) is a South African former soccer player who played as a center-forward. He played club football for Hellenic, Lyngby, Santos, Ajax Cape Town, Maritzburg United, Ikapa Sporting and Vasco Da Gama.

He also played international football for South Africa. He is currently head coach of local amateur Cape Town club Garlandale Football Club.

== International career ==
August has made 16 appearances for the South Africa national football team, his debut coming in a qualifying match for the 2000 African Nations Cup against the Republic of the Congo on 3 September 2000.
