= Daniel Chitsulo =

Malawian footballer

Personal information
- Date of birth: 7 March 1983 (age 43)
- Place of birth: Zomba, Malawi
- Height: 1.69 m (5 ft 7 in)
- Position: Striker

Youth career
- –2000: CIVO United
- 2000–2002: 1. FC Köln

Senior career*
| Years | Team | Apps | (Gls) |
| 1998–2002 | CIVO United | | (18) |
| 2002–2006 | 1. FC Köln II | 111 | (23) |
| 2006–2007 | VfL Osnabrück | 35 | (6) |
| 2008–2009 | Rot Weiss Ahlen | 37 | (6) |
| 2010 | Rot-Weiss Essen | 14 | (1) |
| 2010–2012 | Preußen Münster | 33 | (6) |
| 2013 | SV Bergisch Gladbach 09 | 17 | (3) |
| 2013–2016 | SG Köln-Worringen | 63 | (22) |
| Total | | 312 | (85) |

International career
| 1999–2005 | Malawi | 24 | (8) |
- * Club domestic league appearances and goals

Daniel Chitsulo (born 7 March 1983) is a Malawian former professional footballer who played as a striker and spent most of his career in Germany and represented the Malawi national team internationally.

== Career ==
Chitsulo was born in Zomba. He was the first Malawian born footballer who scored a professional goal in a European League.
