= Alain Nana =

Burkinabé footballer

Personal information
- Date of birth: 7 December 1971 (age 54)
- Position: Midfielder

International career
Years	Team	Apps	(Gls)
1992–2001	Burkina Faso	37	(2)

Alain Nana (born 7 December 1971) is a Burkinabé footballer who played as a midfielder. He played in 28 matches for the Burkina Faso national team from 1994 to 2001. He was also named in Burkina Faso's squad for the 1998 African Cup of Nations tournament.
