= Zéphirin Zoko =

Ivorian footballer

Personal information
- Full name: Zéphirin Gnahoua Zoko
- Date of birth: 13 September 1977 (age 49)
- Place of birth: Abidjan, Ivory Coast
- Height: 1.81 m (5 ft 11 in)
- Position: Forward

Senior career*
Years	Team	Apps	(Gls)
1998–1999	Stade d'Abidjan		
1999–2001	ASEC Mimosas		
2001–2002	Paris FC	15	(9)
2002–2003	Olympique Alès	19	(6)
2003–2004	Cannes	34	(10)
2004–2005	K.V. Oostende	27	(8)
2005–2006	Gent	21	(5)
2006–2007	Nîmes	25	(3)
2007–2009	US Luzenac	53	(13)
Total		194	(54)

International career
2000–2002	Ivory Coast	8	(4)
- * Club domestic league appearances and goals

Zéphirin Gnahoua Zoko (born 13 September 1977) is an Ivorian former professional footballer who played as a forward.

Zoko was a member of the Ivory Coast squad for the 2000 and 2002 Africa Cup of Nations.
