= Francette Razafindrakoto Harifanja =

Malagasy politician

Francette Razafindrakoto Harifanja (about 56 years) is a Malagasy politician. A member of the National Assembly of Madagascar, she was elected as a member of the Tiako I Madagasikara party in the 2007 Malagasy parliamentary elections. She was reelected in 2013. She represents the constituency of Beroroha.
