= Khady Nani Dramé =

Senegalese plant molecular biologist

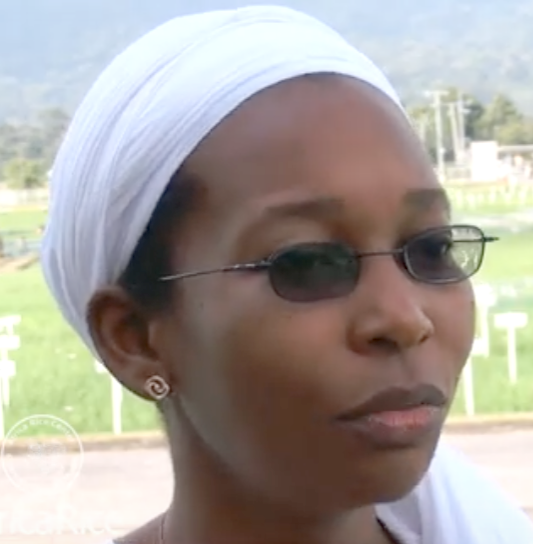
- In an AfricaRice video in 2018
- Born: 1979 (age 46–47)
- Education: Paris-East Créteil /Paris 12 Val de Marne University
- Scientific career
- Fields: rice breeding
- Workplaces: AfricaRice

Khady Nani Dramé (born 1979) is a molecular biologist specialising in plant stress physiology and molecular breeding of rice and peanut who now leads translational use of research into rice production in Africa.

She graduated in 2005 with a PhD in ecophysiology from Paris 12 Val de Marne University. She was initially employed at Africa Rice Center/AfricaRice stations in Benin and Tanzania and became involved as a representative for AfricaRice in the Flagship4 project for the Global Rice Array aiming to provide rice breeders worldwide with better and more comprehensive genomics, genotypes, phenomics and environmental information for rice breeding projects. This involved phenotyping rice varieties in the field worldwide as well as providing detailed molecular genetic information on the same varieties. AfricaRice is one of the collaborative research centres of CGIAR. She then moved to the Africa Rice Center in Abidjan as the head of capacity development. Since 2021 she has been director of the Information and Valorizing Research Unit (UNIVAL) in the Senegalese Institute of Agricultural Research (ISRA).

Dramé's research into stress focused on the consequences of excessive iron in soils. This is a problem in the cultivation of rice because the crop is grown in flooded soils, rather than better-studied rain-fed or irrigated soils. Dramé has investigated the physiology of this specific problem for rice. She has been part of research projects to assess the performance of rice cultivars. This has included landraces local to Senegal, and also large collections of cultivars in soils with high iron levels that lead to stress for plants. Assessment of both growth characteristics, yields and molecular genetic markers led to linking plant performance to specific genetic markers for use in breeding future varieties.

== Publications ==
Dramé is the author or co-author of over 30 scientific publications as well as contributions to on-line genetic resource and data repositories. These include:

- Bathe Diop, Diane R. Wang, Khady Nani Dramé, Vernon Gracen and 7 co-authors (2020) Bridging old and new: Diversity and evaluation of high iron-associated stress response of rice cultivated in W. Africa. Journal of Experimental Biology 71 (14) pp 4188–4200.
- Moussa Sié and 10 co-authors including Khady Nani Dramé (2012) Towards a Rational Use of African Rice (Oryza glaberrima Steud.) for Breeding in Sub-Saharan Africa. Genes, Genomes and Genomics, Global Science Books.
- Elodie Gaulin, Nani Dramé and 13 others (2006) Cellulose binding domains of a Phytophthora cell wall protein are novel pathogen-associated molecular patterns. Plant Cell 18 (7) pp 1766–1777.
- Danièle Clavel, Nani Khady Dramé, Harold Roy-Macauley, Serge Braconnier and Daniel Laffray (2005) Analysis of early responses to drought associated with field drought adaptation in four Sahelian groundnut (Arachis hypogaea L.) cultivars. Environmental and Experimental Biology 54 (3) pp 219-230.

== Awards ==
In 2007 Dramé was one of 15 women selected for an L'Oréal-UNESCO For Women in Science Awards post-doctoral fellowship. She was the recipient of the AfricaRice Dr Robert Carsky Award in 2018.
