= Koman Coulibaly =

Malian football referee (born 1970)

- Full name: Koman Coulibaly
- Born: 4 July 1970 (age 56); Bamako, Mali
- Other occupation: Finance inspector
Years		Role
1993–present		Referee

International
Years	League	Role
1999–present	FIFA-listed	Referee

Koman Coulibaly (born 4 July 1970) is a Malian football referee. He has been a full international referee for FIFA since 1999 and officiated his first international match on 19 April 2000, between Mali and Burkina Faso. Coulibaly is one of Mali's most experienced officials, having been selected for five Africa Cup of Nations tournaments and the 2010 FIFA World Cup. Outside of Africa, he is best known for controversially disallowing a goal in the 2010 World Cup match between the United States and Slovenia.

== Career ==
Coulibaly has a degree from the Faculté des Sciences Juridiques et Économiques (Faculty of Legal and Economic Sciences) at the University of Bamako and is a financial enforcement inspector for the government of Mali. He began his refereeing career in 1994 with the District de Bamako league, then for Ligue 1 championnat national, and was finally promoted as a Malian Football Federation official in 1999.

He was selected as a referee for the 2002 African Cup of Nations in Mali, the 2004 African Cup of Nations in Tunisia, the 2006 African Cup of Nations in Egypt, the 2008 African Cup of Nations in Ghana, and the 2010 African Cup of Nations in Angola. Coulibaly officiated the final of the 2010 African Cup of Nations between Ghana and Egypt.

Coulibaly had to be escorted off the pitch after a match between Al Ahly and Ismaily SC during the group stage of the CAF Champions League.

In 2011, Coulibaly and his assistants were attacked by supporters during the Club Africain v Al Hilal CAF Champions League Match. CAF Disciplinary Committee ordered Africain to play two competition matches behind closed doors and fined the Tunisians $80,000.

=== 2010 FIFA World Cup ===
Coulibaly was preselected as a referee for the 2010 FIFA World Cup in October 2008, one of 32 referees selected for the tournament and one of four African officials.

On 18 June 2010, Coulibaly officiated the Group C match between the United States and Slovenia. In the 86th minute, Coulibaly called a foul against the U.S. that disallowed an apparent goal by Maurice Edu that would have put the Americans ahead 3–2, which resulted in a 2–2 draw. The decision was widely criticized in the international sports press.

On the same day as the U.S.-Slovenia match, Coulibaly was selected as the fourth official for the Italy-New Zealand match two days later. Coulibaly was not chosen to officiate in any subsequent rounds of the tournament and was included in a statement from FIFA President Sepp Blatter who acknowledged problems with officiating at the 2010 World Cup.

== See also ==
- List of football referees
