= Sékou Dramé =

Guinean footballer (born 1973)

Personal information
- Full name: Sékou Oumar Dramé
- Date of birth: 23 December 1973 (age 52)
- Place of birth: Taouyah, Guinea
- Height: 1.85 m (6 ft 1 in)
- Position: Defender

Senior career*
Years	Team	Apps	(Gls)
1993–1994	Stade d'Abidjan		
1995	Horoya AC Conakry		
1995–1999	Lech Poznań	51	(2)
1998	→ Dyskobolia (loan)	5	(0)
1999	Petrochemia Płock	13	(0)
2000	KSZO Ostrowiec	17	(0)
2001–2003	CA Bastia		
2003	Al-Ittihad Kalba		
2003–2004	Dubai FC		
2004	Bontang PKT		
2006	Persis Solo		

International career
1993–2004	Guinea	20	(1)
- * Club domestic league appearances and goals

Sékou Oumar Dramé (born 23 December 1973 in Taouyah) is a Guinean former professional footballer who played as a defender.

== Career ==
Between 1995 and 1998, he was a player of Polish team Lech Poznań. He appeared in 51 league games for Lech, scoring twice. During his stay in Poland, he also played for Petrochemia Płock, Dyskobolia Grodzisk and KSZO Ostrowiec Świętokrzyski. He made a total of 63 appearances in Ekstraklasa. In 2006, Dramé played for Persis Solo in Indonesia.

== International career ==
He was part of the Guinean 2004 African Nations Cup team that finished second in their group in the first round of competition, before losing in the quarter-finals to Mali.

== Personal life ==
His son Jędrzej (born 1998) is also a professional footballer, currently playing as a striker for III liga club Polonia Środa Wielkopolska.
