= Ali Zitouni =

Tunisian former footballer (born 1981)

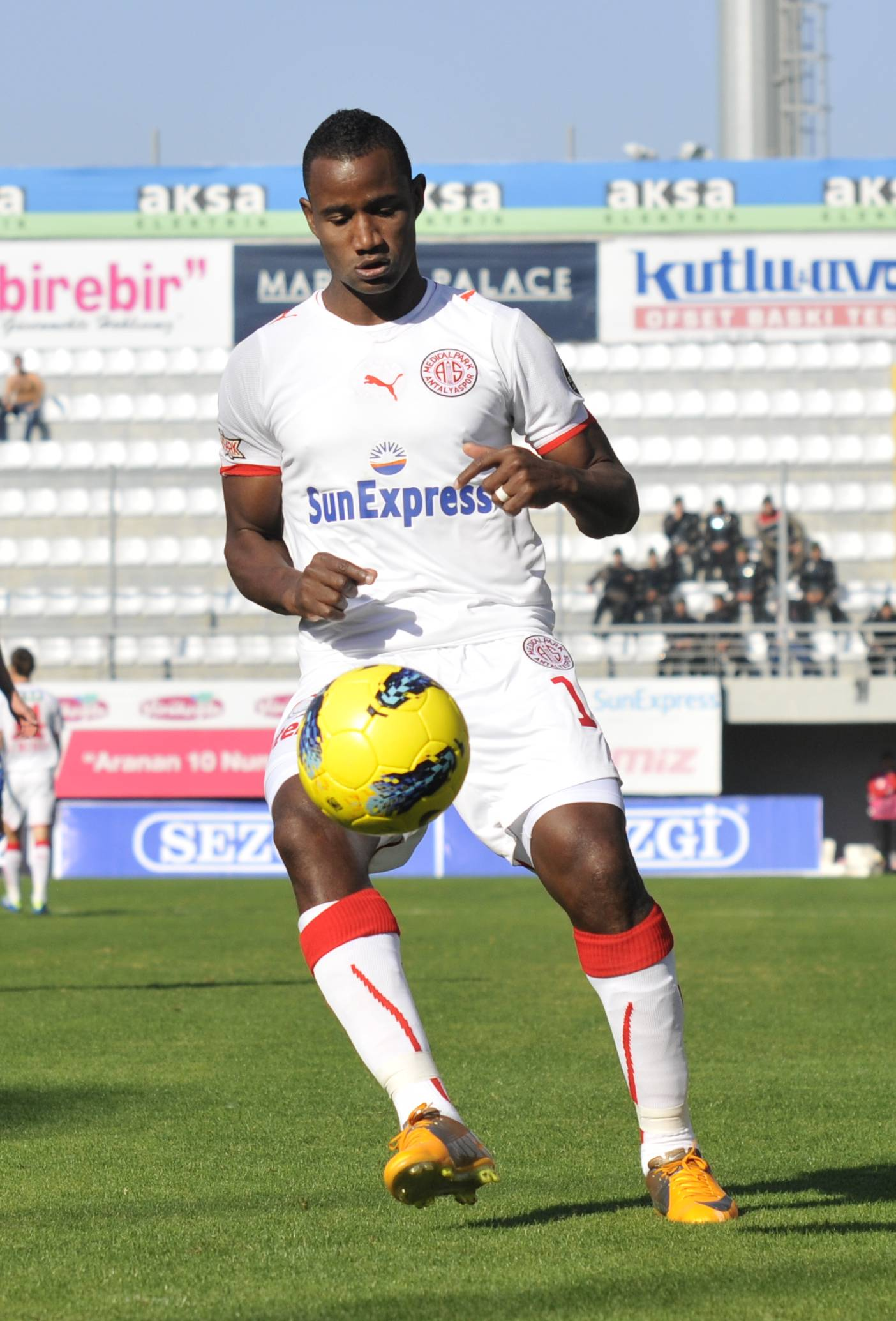

Personal information
- Date of birth: 11 January 1981 (age 45)
- Place of birth: Tunis, Tunisia
- Height: 1.80 m (5 ft 11 in)
- Position: Striker

Senior career*
Years	Team	Apps	(Gls)
1997–2005	Espérance	108	(30)
2005	Al Ahli Dubai	21	(10)
2005–2006	Espérance	18	(3)
2006	Troyes	1	(0)
2006–2007	Espérance	10	(3)
2007–2012	Antalyaspor	148	(22)
2012–2013	Konyaspor	5	(0)
2013	Kartalspor	13	(1)
2013–2014	Hammam-Lif	17	(0)
2016	Konyaaltı Belediyespor	7	(6)
2017	Antalya Akdenizspor	0	(0)

International career
1999–2009	Tunisia	46	(14)
- * Club domestic league appearances and goals

Ali Zitouni (Arabic: علي زيتوني; born 11 January 1981) is a Tunisian former footballer who played as a striker.

== Career ==
Zitouni played for Konyaspor in the Turkish Süper Lig. He previously played for Espérance in Tunisia and was loaned to Troyes AC for six months.

Zitouni played for the Tunisia national football team at the 2002 FIFA World Cup finals. He was also a part of the Tunisia squad at the 2004 Summer Olympics, where the team exited in the first round, finishing third in group C, behind group and gold medal winners Argentina and runners-up Australia.
