= Andrew Sinkala =

Zambian footballer (born 1979)

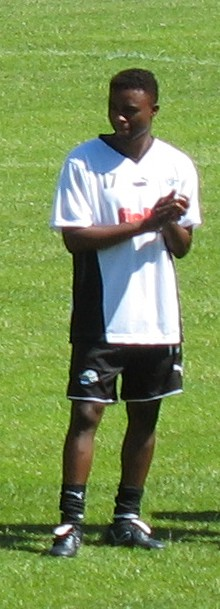
- Sinkala with SC Paderborn

Personal information
- Full name: Andrew Mutambo Sinkala
- Date of birth: 18 June 1979 (age 47)
- Place of birth: Chingola, Zambia
- Height: 1.75 m (5 ft 9 in)
- Position: Midfielder

Senior career*
| Years | Team | Apps | (Gls) |
| 1998–1999 | Nchanga Rangers | | |
| 1999–2001 | Bayern Munich II | 40 | (7) |
| 1999–2001 | Bayern Munich | 1 | (0) |
| 2001–2006 | 1. FC Köln | 83 | (4) |
| 2006–2008 | SC Paderborn | 34 | (1) |
| 2008–2012 | FC Augsburg | 72 | (3) |
| 2012–2014 | Viktoria Köln | 23 | (0) |
| Total | | 253 | (15) |

International career
| 2000–2010 | Zambia | 18 | (1) |
- * Club domestic league appearances and goals

Andrew Mutambo Sinkala (born 18 June 1979) is a Zambian former professional football midfielder. From 1999, he was exclusively under contract with clubs in Germany.

== Club career ==
After his retirement from professional football, Sinkala continued to play amateur football for SG Köln-Worringen in the sixth-tier Landesliga Mittelrhein.

== International career ==
Sinkala captained the Zambia U-20 national football team to both the African Youth Nations Youth World Cup in Nigeria in 1999. He also won his first senior cap in the same year against Democratic Republic of the Congo in an Africa Cup of Nations qualifier.

He represented the Zambia national team at the Africa Cup of Nations in 2000, 2002, 2006 and 2010.

== Personal life ==
His late father, Moffat Mutambo, also played for Nchanga Rangers and the national soccer team as a defender. Sinkala's brother, Nathan Sinkala, is also a football player and has also played for Zambia.

== Honours ==
- DFB-Ligapokal winner: 1999, 2000
