= Jean-Yves Randriamarozaka =

Malagasy footballer

Personal information
- Date of birth: 8 April 1975 (age 51)
- Position: Forward

Senior career*
| Years | Team | Apps | (Gls) |
- DSA Antananarivo

International career
| 1999–2003 | Madagascar | 9 | (2) |
- * Club domestic league appearances and goals

Jean-Yves Randriamarozaka (born 8 April 1975) is a retired Malagasy football striker.
