= Elysé Razafindrakoto =

Malagasy footballer

Personal information
- Date of birth: 12 June 1974 (age 52)
- Position: Defender

Senior career*
Years	Team	Apps	(Gls)
1995–1998	AS Port		
1999	AS Fortior		
2000	AS Port		
2001–2002	USCA Foot		
2003–2009	Léopards de Transfoot		

International career
1998–2003	Madagascar	10	(1)
- * Club domestic league appearances and goals

Elysé Razafindrakoto (born 12 June 1974) is a retired Malagasy football defender.
