= Sherif Touré Coubageat =

Togolese footballer

Personal information
- Full name: Mohammed El-Sherif Touré Coubageat
- Date of birth: 27 December 1983 (age 42)
- Place of birth: Lomé, Togo
- Height: 1.77 m (5 ft 10 in)
- Position: Forward

Youth career
- 1999–2000: Hannover 96 II

Senior career*
Years	Team	Apps	(Gls)
2000–2001	Hannover 96		
2001–2006	Concordia Ihrhove		
2006–2007	Germania Leer		

International career
2000–2007	Togo	12	(4)
- * Club domestic league appearances and goals

Mohammed El-Sherif Touré Coubageat (born 27 December 1983) is a Togolese former footballer who played as a forward. He represented the Togo national team at the 2006 Africa Cup of Nations.
