= Walter Bakouma =

Congolese footballer (born 1980)

Personal information
- Full name: Walter Silva Bakouma Sitou
- Date of birth: November 14, 1980 (age 45)
- Place of birth: Mvouti, Congo
- Height: 1.71 m (5 ft 7 1/2 in)
- Position: Midfielder

Team information
- Current team: SP Mazieres

Senior career*
Years	Team	Apps	(Gls)
2000–2002	Calvi		
2002–2003	Gap FC		
2003–2005	USF Le Puy		
2005–2010	Les Herbiers VF		
2017–	SP Mazieres		

International career
1999–2004	Congo	26	(3)
- * Club domestic league appearances and goals as of 22:04, 25 November 2009 (UTC)

Walter Silva Bakouma Sitou, known as Walter Bakouma (born November 14, 1980, in Mvouti) is a Congolese professional footballer. Currently, he plays in the Championnat de France amateur for SP MAZIERES.

He played 11 games and scored 3 goals for the Congo national football team.Champions avec Sp Mazieres saison 2021-2022
