= Alfa Potowabawi =

Togolese footballer

Personal information
- Full name: Alfa Potowabawi
- Date of birth: 1 June 1979
- Place of birth: Togo
- Date of death: 3 May 2017 (aged 37)
- Position: Forward

Senior career*
Years	Team	Apps	(Gls)
1999–2000	Real Tamale United		
2001–2002	CO Korhogo		
2003–2006	Terengganu FA		
2006–2007	Thanh Hóa F.C.		

International career^{‡}
1999–2001	Togo	1	(1)
- * Club domestic league appearances and goals as of 20 July 2010 ‡ National team caps and goals as of 20 July 2010

Alfa Potowabawi (1 June 1979 – 3 March 2017) was a Togolese football striker. He later worked as a football agent.

== Club career ==
He played for clubs in Ghana, Ivory Coast, Malaysia, and Vietnam.

== International career ==
He was a Togo international, appearing once in a 2002 FIFA World Cup qualification match against Angola. He scored his only international goal in the match.

== Death ==
He was killed on 3 March 2017, in a traffic accident.
