= Mohamed Guezzaz =

Moroccan football referee (born 1962)

Mohamed Guezzaz (Arabic: محمد كزاز; born 1 October 1962) is a retired association football referee from Morocco, best known for supervising match Spain–Slovenia during the 2002 FIFA World Cup.

Guezzaz was the last Moroccan to serve as a central referee in the FIFA World Cup until the 2026 edition in North America, when Jalal Jayed was selected as Morocco's referee in the tournament, leading a trio along with two fellow Moroccans as assistant referees.
