= Charles Lota =

Zambian football player (born 1978)

Personal information
- Date of birth: 17 November 1978 (age 47)
- Position: Midfielder

Senior career*
Years	Team	Apps	(Gls)
1998–2000	Konkola Blades		
2001–2002	Kabwe Warriors		
2003–2004	Red Arrows		

International career
1997–2002	Zambia	17	(3)
- * Club domestic league appearances and goals

Charles Lota (born 17 November 1978) is a Zambian former footballer who played as a midfielder for Konkola Blades, Kabwe Warriors and Red Arrows, as well as the Zambia national football team. He played for Zambia at the 2002 Africa Cup of Nations.
