= Nchanga Stadium =

Multi-use stadium in Nchanga North, Chingola, Zambia

Coordinates: 12°31′28″S 27°51′49″E

Nchanga Stadium is a multi-use stadium in Nchanga North, Chingola, Zambia. It is currently used mostly for football matches and serves as the home for Nchanga Rangers. The stadium holds 20,000 people.

It is owned by Nchanga Rangers Football Club which in turn is owned by Konkola Copper Mines.
