= 2000 African Cup of Nations squads =

List of footballers

Below is a list of squads of the 2000 African Cup of Nations.

== Group A ==
=== Cameroon ===
Coach: (France) Pierre Lechantre

No.	Pos.	Player	Date of birth (age)	Caps	Club
1	GK	Alioum Boukar	3 January 1972 (aged 28)		(Turkey) Samsunspor
2	DF	Timotée Atouba	17 February 1982 (aged 18)		(Cameroon) Union Douala
3	DF	Pierre Womé	26 March 1979 (aged 20)		(Italy) Bologna
4	DF	Rigobert Song	1 July 1976 (aged 23)		(England) Liverpool
5	DF	Raymond Kalla	22 April 1975 (aged 24)		(Spain) Extremadura
6	DF	Pierre Njanka	15 March 1975 (aged 24)		(France) Strasbourg
7	FW	Bernard Tchoutang	2 September 1976 (aged 23)		(Netherlands) Roda JC
8	DF	Geremi	20 December 1978 (aged 21)		(Spain) Real Madrid
9	FW	Samuel Eto'o	10 March 1981 (aged 18)		(Spain) Real Madrid
10	FW	Patrick M'Boma	15 November 1970 (aged 29)		(Italy) Cagliari
11	MF	Pius N'Diefi	5 July 1975 (aged 24)		(France) Sedan
12	DF	Lauren	19 January 1977 (aged 23)		(Spain) Mallorca
13	DF	Lucien Mettomo	19 April 1977 (aged 22)		(France) Saint-Étienne
14	DF	Michel Pensée Billong	16 June 1973 (aged 26)		(Portugal) Gil Vicente
15	MF	Joseph N'Do	28 April 1976 (aged 23)		(France) Strasbourg
16	GK	Daniel Bekono	31 May 1978 (aged 21)		(Cameroon) Canon Yaoundé
17	MF	Marc-Vivien Foé	1 May 1975 (aged 24)		(England) West Ham United
18	DF	Innocent Hamga	8 May 1981 (aged 18)		(Cameroon) Coton Sport
19	MF	Marcel Mahouvé	16 January 1973 (aged 27)		(France) Montpellier
20	MF	Salomon Olembé	8 December 1980 (aged 19)		(France) Nantes
21	FW	Joseph-Désiré Job	1 December 1977 (aged 22)		(France) Lens
22	GK	Souleymanou Hamidou	22 November 1973 (aged 26)		(Cameroon) Coton Sport

=== Ghana ===
Coach: (Italy) Giuseppe Dossena

No.	Pos.	Player	Date of birth (age)	Caps	Club
1	GK	Richard Kingson	13 June 1978 (aged 21)		(Turkey) Göztepe
2	DF	Eben Dugbatey	31 July 1973 (aged 26)		(France) Lorient
3	MF	Emmanuel Kuffour	6 April 1976 (aged 23)		(Ghana) Hearts of Oak
4	DF	Samuel Kuffour	3 September 1976 (aged 23)		(Germany) Bayern Munich
5	MF	Stephen Baidoo	25 September 1976 (aged 23)		(Turkey) Fenerbahçe
6	DF	Mohammed Gargo	19 June 1975 (aged 24)		(Italy) Udinese
7	FW	Yaw Preko	8 September 1974 (aged 25)		(Turkey) Fenerbahçe
8	MF	Mark Edusei	29 September 1976 (aged 23)		(Portugal) União de Leiria
9	FW	Kwame Ayew	28 December 1973 (aged 26)		(Portugal) Sporting CP
10	MF	Charles Akonnor	12 March 1974 (aged 25)		(Germany) VfL Wolfsburg
11	FW	Augustine Ahinful	30 November 1974 (aged 25)		(Portugal) Boavista
12	GK	Constance Mantey	31 August 1976 (aged 23)		(Ghana) Asante Kotoko
13	DF	Jacob Nettey	25 January 1976 (aged 24)		(Ghana) Hearts of Oak
14	DF	Christian Gyan	2 November 1978 (aged 21)		(Netherlands) Feyenoord
15	MF	Samuel Johnson	25 July 1973 (aged 26)		(Turkey) Fenerbahçe
16	MF	Stephen Appiah	24 December 1980 (aged 19)		(Italy) Udinese
17	FW	Peter Ofori-Quaye	21 March 1980 (aged 19)		(Greece) Olympiacos
18	FW	Ohene Kennedy	28 March 1973 (aged 26)		(Turkey) Ankaragücü
19	MF	Daniel Addo	6 November 1976 (aged 23)		(Germany) Karlsruher SC
20	MF	Otto Addo	9 June 1975 (aged 24)		(Germany) Borussia Dortmund
21	MF	Alex Nyarko	15 October 1973 (aged 26)		(France) Lens
22	GK	Sammy Adjei	18 November 1973 (aged 26)		(Ghana) Hearts of Oak

=== Ivory Coast ===
Coach: Gbonka Tia Martin

No.	Pos.	Player	Date of birth (age)	Caps	Club
1	GK	Alain Gouaméné	15 June 1966 (aged 33)		(France) Toulouse
2	MF	Lassina Dao	6 February 1971 (aged 29)		(Ivory Coast) Africa Sports
3	DF	Patrice Zere	20 December 1970 (aged 29)		(Belgium) Lokeren
4	MF	Lassina Diabaté	16 September 1974 (aged 25)		(France) Bordeaux
5	DF	Ghislain Akassou	15 February 1975 (aged 25)		(Switzerland) Lugano
6	DF	Olivier Tébily	19 December 1975 (aged 24)		(Scotland) Celtic
7	MF	Ibrahima Koné	26 July 1969 (aged 30)		(Ivory Coast) Africa Sports
8	DF	Didier Angan	27 August 1974 (aged 25)		(France) Nice
9	FW	Blaise Kouassi	2 February 1974 (aged 26)		(Ivory Coast) ASEC Abidjan
10	FW	Ibrahima Bakayoko	31 December 1976 (aged 23)		(France) Marseille
11	FW	Hamed Modibo Diallo	18 December 1976 (aged 23)		(France) Le Havre
12	MF	Serge Dié	4 October 1977 (aged 22)		(Italy) Reggina
13	MF	Aliou Siby Badra	26 February 1971 (aged 28)		(Ivory Coast) ASEC Abidjan
14	MF	Tchiressoua Guel	27 December 1975 (aged 24)		(France) Saint-Étienne
15	FW	Bonaventure Kalou	12 January 1978 (aged 22)		(Netherlands) Feyenoord
16	GK	Seydou Diarra	16 April 1968 (aged 31)		(Ivory Coast) ASEC Abidjan
17	DF	Cyril Domoraud	22 July 1971 (aged 28)		(Italy) Internazionale
18	FW	Charles Dago	1 November 1975 (aged 24)		(Belgium) Lokeren
19	DF	Dominique Sam Abouo	26 December 1973 (aged 26)		(Belgium) Lokeren
20	FW	Zéphirin Zoko	13 September 1977 (aged 22)		(Ivory Coast) ASEC Abidjan
21	MF	Donald-Olivier Sie	3 April 1970 (aged 29)		(France) RC Paris
22	GK	Jean-Jacques Tizié	7 September 1972 (aged 27)		(Ivory Coast) Africa Sports

=== Togo ===
Coach: (Germany) Gottlieb Goeller

No.	Pos.	Player	Date of birth (age)	Caps	Club
1	GK	Waké Nibombé	19 February 1974 (aged 26)		(Ghana) Ashanti Gold
2	DF	Messan Ametokodo	3 December 1974 (aged 25)		(Togo) Dynamic Togolais
3	MF	Yao Senaya	18 October 1979 (aged 20)		(France) Red Star
4	DF	Massamasso Tchangai	8 August 1978 (aged 21)		(Netherlands) De Graafschap
5	DF	Yaovi Abalo	26 June 1975 (aged 24)		(France) Amiens
6	MF	Abibou Tchagnao	25 March 1975 (aged 24)		(Switzerland) Basel
7	DF	Tadjou Salou	24 December 1974 (aged 25)		(Switzerland) Servette
8	MF	Lantame Ouadja	28 August 1977 (aged 22)		(Switzerland) Servette
9	FW	Koffi Fiawoo	3 October 1969 (aged 30)		(France) Lorient
10	MF	Chérif Touré Mamam	13 January 1978 (aged 22)		(United Arab Emirates) Al-Jazeera
11	FW	Franck Dote	15 December 1975 (aged 24)		(Gabon) Wongosport
12	MF	Yao Aziawonou	30 November 1979 (aged 20)		(Switzerland) Sion
13	MF	Komlan Assignon	20 January 1974 (aged 26)		(France) Cannes
14	DF	Franck Atsou	1 August 1978 (aged 21)		(Ghana) Asante Kotoko
15	FW	Abdou Moumouni	19 November 1982 (aged 17)		(Switzerland) Wangen b.O.
16	GK	Kossi Agassa	2 July 1978 (aged 21)		(Togo) Étoile Filante de Lomé
17	FW	Mohamed Kader	8 April 1979 (aged 20)		(Switzerland) Lugano
18	FW	Bachirou Salou	15 September 1970 (aged 29)		(Germany) Eintracht Frankfurt
19	DF	Libambani Yedibahoma	13 January 1973 (aged 27)		(Tunisia) Club Africain
20	FW	Djima Oyawolé	18 October 1976 (aged 23)		(France) Louhans-Cuiseaux
21	MF	Mohamed Coubageat	14 November 1982 (aged 17)		(Togo) Maranatha
22	GK	Juvénal Pédomey	29 November 1979 (aged 20)		(Togo) Entente Lomé

== Group B ==
=== South Africa ===
Coach: Trott Moloto

No.	Pos.	Player	Date of birth (age)	Caps	Club
1	GK	Hans Vonk	30 January 1970 (aged 30)		(Netherlands) Heerenveen
2	DF	Papi Khomane	31 January 1975 (aged 25)		(South Africa) Orlando Pirates
3	DF	Frank Schoeman	30 July 1975 (aged 24)		(South Africa) Mamelodi Sundowns
4	DF	Lucas Radebe	12 April 1969 (aged 30)		(England) Leeds United
5	DF	Mark Fish	14 March 1974 (aged 25)		(England) Bolton Wanderers
6	FW	Glen Salmon	24 October 1977 (aged 22)		(Netherlands) NAC Breda
7	MF	Quinton Fortune	21 May 1977 (aged 22)		(England) Manchester United
8	MF	Thabo Mngomeni	24 June 1969 (aged 30)		(South Africa) Orlando Pirates
9	FW	Shaun Bartlett	31 October 1972 (aged 27)		(Switzerland) Zürich
10	MF	John Moshoeu	18 December 1965 (aged 34)		(Turkey) Fenerbahçe
11	MF	Helman Mkhalele	20 October 1969 (aged 30)		(Turkey) Ankaragücü
12	MF	Steve Lekoelea	5 February 1979 (aged 21)		(South Africa) Orlando Pirates
13	DF	Pierre Issa	11 September 1975 (aged 24)		(France) Marseille
14	FW	Pollen Ndlanya	22 May 1970 (aged 29)		(Turkey) Göztepe
15	FW	Daniel Mudau	4 September 1968 (aged 31)		(South Africa) Mamelodi Sundowns
16	GK	John Tlale	15 May 1967 (aged 32)		(South Africa) Mamelodi Sundowns
17	FW	Siyabonga Nomvete	2 December 1977 (aged 22)		(South Africa) Kaizer Chiefs
18	MF	Alex Bapela	4 October 1969 (aged 30)		(South Africa) Mamelodi Sundowns
19	MF	Dumisa Ngobe	5 March 1973 (aged 26)		(South Africa) Orlando Pirates
20	MF	Isaac Shai	26 February 1971 (aged 28)		(South Africa) Mamelodi Sundowns
21	MF	Eric Tinkler	30 July 1970 (aged 29)		(England) Barnsley
22	GK	Andre Arendse	27 June 1967 (aged 32)		(England) Oxford United

=== Algeria ===
Coach: Nasser Sandjak

No.	Pos.	Player	Date of birth (age)	Caps	Club
1	GK	Abdesslam Benabdellah	12 January 1964 (aged 36)		(Algeria) MC Oran
2	DF	Maamar Mamouni	28 February 1976 (aged 23)		(France) Le Havre
3	DF	Abdelazziz Benhamlat	22 March 1974 (aged 25)		(Algeria) JS Kabylie
4	DF	Rezki Amrouche	10 November 1970 (aged 29)		(Tunisia) Club Africain
5	DF	Mounir Zeghdoud	18 November 1970 (aged 29)		(Algeria) USM Alger
6	DF	Yacine Amaouche	26 June 1979 (aged 20)		(Algeria) JSM Béjaïa
7	MF	Nasreddine Kraouche	27 August 1979 (aged 20)		(France) Metz
8	MF	Billel Dziri	21 January 1972 (aged 28)		(France) Sedan
9	FW	Farid Ghazi	16 March 1974 (aged 25)		(France) Troyes
10	MF	Abdelhafid Tasfaout	11 February 1969 (aged 31)		(France) Guingamp
11	FW	Fawzi Moussouni	8 April 1972 (aged 27)		(Algeria) JS Kabylie
12	FW	Yacine Slatni	3 November 1973 (aged 26)		(Algeria) MC Alger
13	DF	Moulay Haddou	14 June 1975 (aged 24)		(Algeria) MC Oran
14	MF	Fayçal Badji	15 February 1973 (aged 27)		(Algeria) CR Belouizdad
15	FW	Rafik Saïfi	7 February 1975 (aged 25)		(France) Troyes
16	GK	Aomar Hamened	7 February 1969 (aged 31)		(Algeria) MC Alger
17	MF	Brahim Mezouar	18 February 1973 (aged 27)		(Algeria) CR Belouizdad
18	MF	Moussa Saïb (c)	6 March 1969 (aged 30)		(Saudi Arabia) Al-Nassr
19	FW	Ali Meçabih	2 July 1972 (aged 27)		(Algeria) MC Oran
20	MF	Mahieddine Meftah	25 September 1968 (aged 31)		(Algeria) USM Alger
21	FW	Hamid Merakchi	28 January 1976 (aged 24)		(Turkey) Gençlerbirliği
22	GK	Lamine Boughrara	1 December 1971 (aged 28)		(Algeria) JS Kabylie

=== DR Congo ===
Coach: Basilua Lusadusu

No.	Pos.	Player	Date of birth (age)	Caps	Club
1	GK	Marcel Nkueni	12 April 1978 (aged 21)		(Democratic Republic of the Congo) DC Motemba Pembe
2	DF	Dikilu Bageta	24 March 1978 (aged 21)		(Democratic Republic of the Congo) DC Motemba Pembe
3	DF	Kabwe Kasongo	31 July 1970 (aged 29)		(Portugal) Chaves
4	DF	Yves Yuvuladio	5 May 1978 (aged 21)		(Democratic Republic of the Congo) DC Motemba Pembe
5	DF	Esele Bakasu	14 September 1974 (aged 25)		(England) Cambridge United
6	MF	Ndjeka Mukando	17 November 1979 (aged 20)		(Democratic Republic of the Congo) DC Motemba Pembe
7	FW	Banza Kasongo	26 June 1974 (aged 25)		(Germany) VfL Wolfsburg
8	MF	Makaya Nsilulu	5 May 1977 (aged 22)		(Tunisia) Espérance
9	FW	Félix-Michel Ngonge	10 January 1967 (aged 33)		(England) Watford
10	FW	Serge Mputu Mbungu	21 May 1980 (aged 19)		(Sudan) Al-Hilal
11	MF	Emeka Mamale	21 October 1977 (aged 22)		(South Africa) Kaizer Chiefs
12	GK	Nkombe Tokala	26 March 1974 (aged 25)		(Democratic Republic of the Congo) AS Vita Club
13	FW	Missilou Mangituka	26 November 1976 (aged 23)		Zimbabwe Saints
14	DF	Michel Dinzey	15 October 1972 (aged 27)		(Germany) 1860 Munich
15	FW	Joseph Londji	19 April 1980 (aged 19)		(Germany) 1. FC Köln
16	MF	Apataki Kifu	4 September 1977 (aged 22)		(Democratic Republic of the Congo) DC Motemba Pembe
17	FW	Kanku Mulekelayi	1 April 1977 (aged 22)		(Democratic Republic of the Congo) FC Lupopo
18	FW	Jean-Jacques Yemweni	4 April 1973 (aged 26)		(Democratic Republic of the Congo) DC Motemba Pembe
19	MF	Ndompetelo Mbabu	6 March 1970 (aged 29)		(Democratic Republic of the Congo) AS Vita Club
20	MF	Epotele Bazamba	13 May 1976 (aged 23)		(Democratic Republic of the Congo) AS Dragons
21	FW	Mubama Kibwey	9 June 1970 (aged 29)		(France) SO Châtellerault
22	FW	Tusikila Mampuya	2 February 1977 (aged 23)		(Democratic Republic of the Congo) AC Sodigraf

=== Gabon ===
Coach: (Brazil) Antonio Dumas

No.	Pos.	Player	Date of birth (age)	Caps	Club
1	GK	Jacques Deckousshoud	12 May 1964 (aged 35)		(Gabon) FC 105 Libreville
2	FW	Henry Antchouet	2 August 1979 (aged 20)		(Gabon) FC 105 Libreville
3	DF	Tristan Mombo	24 August 1974 (aged 25)		(Gabon) FC 105 Libreville
4	DF	Jean-Martin Mouloungui	30 November 1969 (aged 30)		(Greece) Panelefsiniakos
5	DF	Guy-Roger N'zeng	30 May 1970 (aged 29)		(South Africa) Orlando Pirates
6	MF	Thierry Mouyouma	5 January 1975 (aged 25)		(France) CA Paris
7	FW	Théodore Nzue Nguema	9 November 1973 (aged 26)		(Portugal) Braga
8	DF	Constant Tamboucha	3 May 1976 (aged 23)		(Gabon) FC 105 Libreville
9	FW	Daniel Cousin	7 February 1977 (aged 23)		(France) Chamois Niortais
10	MF	Jonas Ogandaga	1 August 1975 (aged 24)		(Tunisia) CO Medenine
11	DF	François Amegasse	10 October 1965 (aged 34)		(Gabon) Petrosport
12	FW	Shiva N'Zigou	24 October 1983 (aged 16)		(France) Nantes
13	FW	Bruno Zita Mbanangoyé	15 July 1980 (aged 19)		(Gabon) Petrosport
14	DF	Chantry Muie Nguema	11 March 1980 (aged 19)		(Gabon) Petrosport
15	DF	Eric Ondo	1 August 1970 (aged 29)		(Tunisia) ES Zarzis
16	GK	Germain Mendome	21 August 1970 (aged 29)		(Gabon) Aigles Verts
17	FW	Yves Nza-Boutamba	27 January 1974 (aged 26)		(Tunisia) ES Zarzis
18	MF	Dieudonné Londo	6 June 1976 (aged 23)		(Morocco) Raja Casablanca
19	MF	René Nsi Akoué	9 October 1975 (aged 24)		(Gabon) FC 105 Libreville
20	DF	Cedric Moubamba	14 October 1979 (aged 20)		(Gabon) Mbilinga FC
21	FW	Armand Ossey	19 October 1978 (aged 21)		(Portugal) Moreirense
22	GK	Michel Souamas	26 February 1975 (aged 24)		(Gabon) Petrosport

== Group C ==
=== Egypt ===
Coach: (France) Gerard Gili

No.	Pos.	Player	Date of birth (age)	Caps	Club
1	GK	Nader El-Sayed	31 December 1972 (aged 27)		(Belgium) Club Brugge
2	DF	Ibrahim Hassan	10 August 1966 (aged 33)		(Egypt) Al Ahly
3	DF	Mohamed Emara	10 June 1974 (aged 25)		(Germany) Hansa Rostock
4	DF	Hany Ramzy	10 March 1969 (aged 30)		(Germany) 1. FC Kaiserslautern
5	DF	Abdel-Zaher El-Saqua	30 January 1974 (aged 26)		(Turkey) Denizlispor
6	MF	Sayed Abdel Hafeez	27 October 1977 (aged 22)		(Egypt) Al Ahly
7	DF	Mohamed Youssef	9 October 1970 (aged 29)		(Turkey) Denizlispor
8	DF	Yasser Radwan	22 April 1972 (aged 27)		(Germany) Hansa Rostock
9	FW	Hossam Hassan	10 August 1966 (aged 33)		(Egypt) Al Ahly
10	MF	Abd El-Satar Sabry	19 June 1974 (aged 25)		(Portugal) Benfica
11	FW	Tarek El-Said	5 April 1978 (aged 21)		(Egypt) Al-Zamalek
12	MF	Hossam Abd El-Moneim	12 February 1975 (aged 25)		(Turkey) Kocaelispor
13	MF	Abdel Haleem Ali	24 October 1973 (aged 26)		(Egypt) Al-Zamalek
14	FW	Hazem Emam	10 May 1975 (aged 24)		(Netherlands) De Graafschap
15	DF	Ibrahim Said	16 October 1979 (aged 20)		(Egypt) Al Ahly
16	GK	Essam El-Hadary	15 January 1973 (aged 27)		(Egypt) Al Ahly
17	MF	Ahmed Hassan	2 May 1975 (aged 24)		(Turkey) Kocaelispor
18	MF	Mohamed Farouk	9 October 1978 (aged 21)		(Egypt) Al Ahly
19	FW	Ahmed Salah Hosny	11 July 1979 (aged 20)		(Germany) VfB Stuttgart
20	DF	Hady Khashaba	19 December 1972 (aged 27)		(Egypt) Al Ahly
21	MF	Ayman Abdel Aziz	20 November 1978 (aged 21)		(Egypt) Al-Zamalek
22	GK	Abdel Wahed El-Sayed	3 June 1977 (aged 22)		(Egypt) Al-Zamalek

=== Senegal ===
Coach: (Germany) Peter Schnittger

No.	Pos.	Player	Date of birth (age)	Caps	Club
1	GK	Omar Diallo	28 September 1972 (aged 27)		(Morocco) Olympique Khouribga
2	DF	Omar Daf	12 February 1977 (aged 23)		(France) Sochaux
3	FW	Omar Traoré	27 February 1975 (aged 24)		(Saudi Arabia) Al-Riyadh
4	DF	Papa Malick Diop	29 December 1974 (aged 25)		(France) Strasbourg
5	DF	Pape Hamadou N'Diaye	24 July 1977 (aged 22)		(Senegal) ASC Ndiambour
6	MF	Papa Daouda Sene	18 November 1976 (aged 23)		(Tunisia) CA Bizertin
7	FW	Henri Camara	10 May 1977 (aged 22)		(Switzerland) Neuchâtel Xamax
8	MF	Mbaye Badji	25 February 1976 (aged 23)		(Morocco) AS Salé
9	DF	Assane N'Diaye	1 August 1974 (aged 25)		(Senegal) ASC Jeanne d'Arc
10	FW	Khalilou Fadiga	30 December 1974 (aged 25)		(Belgium) Club Brugge
11	FW	Salif Keita	19 October 1975 (aged 24)		(Germany) Hannover 96
12	FW	Mame Ibra Touré	23 April 1971 (aged 28)		(Senegal) ASC Ndiambour
13	DF	Ousmane Diop	9 December 1975 (aged 24)		(Greece) Skoda Xanthi
14	FW	Moussa N'Diaye	22 February 1979 (aged 21)		(France) Monaco
15	MF	Pape Niokhor Fall	15 September 1977 (aged 22)		(Senegal) ASC Jeanne d'Arc
16	DF	Cheikh Sidy Ba	21 March 1968 (aged 31)		(Austria) Linzer ASK
17	MF	Pape Sarr	7 December 1977 (aged 22)		(France) Saint-Étienne
18	GK	Ousseynou Ndiour	18 March 1971 (aged 28)		(Morocco) FUS Rabat
19	DF	Mamadou Sylla	4 April 1975 (aged 24)		(Senegal) AS Douanes
20	FW	Fary Faye	24 December 1974 (aged 25)		(Portugal) Beira-Mar
21	FW	Abdoulaye Mbaye	13 November 1973 (aged 26)		(Tunisia) Club Africain
22	GK	Daouda Ly	21 October 1972 (aged 27)		(Senegal) ASC Ndiambour

=== Zambia ===
Coach: Ben Bamfuchile

No.	Pos.	Player	Date of birth (age)	Caps	Club
1	GK	Davies Phiri	1 April 1976 (aged 23)		(Zambia) Kabwe Warriors
2	DF	Laughter Chilembe	25 November 1975 (aged 24)		(Zambia) Nchanga Rangers
3	DF	Elijah Litana	5 December 1970 (aged 29)		(Saudi Arabia) Al-Hilal
4	DF	Moses Sichone	31 May 1977 (aged 22)		(Germany) 1. FC Köln
5	DF	Elija Tana	28 February 1975 (aged 24)		(Zambia) Nchanga Rangers
6	DF	Kampamba Chintu	28 December 1980 (aged 19)		(Zambia) Kabwe Warriors
7	DF	Hillary Makasa	12 January 1975 (aged 25)		(South Africa) Ajax Cape Town
8	DF	Mannaseh Mwanza	12 December 1978 (aged 21)		(Zambia) Power Dynamos
9	FW	Masauso Tembo	25 February 1978 (aged 21)		(United Arab Emirates) Al-Oruba
10	FW	Dennis Lota	8 December 1973 (aged 26)		(South Africa) Orlando Pirates
11	MF	Kalusha Bwalya	16 August 1963 (aged 36)		(Mexico) Veracruz
12	MF	Andrew Tembo	19 August 1971 (aged 28)		(Denmark) Odense
13	MF	Mumamba Numba	21 March 1978 (aged 21)		(Zambia) Konkola Blades
14	MF	Perry Mutapa	18 November 1979 (aged 20)		(Portugal) Farense
15	MF	Rotson Kilambe	6 August 1978 (aged 21)		(Zambia) Power Dynamos
16	GK	Emmanuel Misichili	6 June 1978 (aged 21)		(Zambia) Nkana
17	MF	Andrew Sinkala	18 June 1979 (aged 20)		(Germany) Bayern Munich
18	MF	Mwape Miti	24 May 1973 (aged 26)		(Denmark) Odense
19	MF	Arthur Lungu	13 April 1976 (aged 23)		(Zambia) Zamsure
20	DF	Jones Mwewa	12 March 1973 (aged 26)		(Zambia) Power Dynamos
21	FW	Bernard Makufi	16 January 1979 (aged 21)		(Sweden) IFK Hässleholm
22	GK	Kenny Mwila	1 February 1972 (aged 28)		(Zambia) Power Dynamos

=== Burkina Faso ===
Coach: (Belgium) René Taelman

No.	Pos.	Player	Date of birth (age)	Caps	Club
1	GK	Mathieu Traoré	22 April 1972 (aged 27)		(Burkina Faso) USFA
2	MF	Seydou Traoré	17 May 1970 (aged 29)		(United Arab Emirates) Al Ain Club
3	DF	Brahima Cissé	10 February 1976 (aged 24)		(Burkina Faso) USFA
4	DF	Issa Sanogo	30 November 1971 (aged 28)		(Burkina Faso) ASFA Yennega
5	DF	Madou Dossama	24 July 1972 (aged 27)		(Burkina Faso) Étoile Filante
6	DF	Brahima Korbeogo	23 January 1975 (aged 25)		(Burkina Faso) USFA
7	MF	Ismael Koudou	27 September 1975 (aged 24)		(Burkina Faso) ASFA Yennega
8	FW	Mamadou Koné	6 May 1974 (aged 25)		(Burkina Faso) Etoile Filante
9	FW	Alassane Ouédraogo	7 September 1980 (aged 19)		(Belgium) Charleroi
10	FW	Mamadou Zongo	8 October 1980 (aged 19)		(Netherlands) Vitesse
11	MF	Ousmane Sanou	11 March 1978 (aged 21)		(Netherlands) Willem II
12	FW	Brahima Traoré	24 February 1974 (aged 25)		(United Arab Emirates) Al Dhaid FC
13	DF	Jean-Michel Liade Gnonka	20 July 1980 (aged 19)		(Burkina Faso) ASFA Yennega
14	FW	Moumouni Dagano	3 January 1981 (aged 19)		(Burkina Faso) Étoile Filante
15	DF	Ousmane Traoré	7 March 1977 (aged 22)		(Burkina Faso) ASFA Yennega
16	GK	Issoufou Sawadogo	17 June 1975 (aged 24)		(Burkina Faso) Etoile Filante
17	FW	Amadou Tidiane Fall	22 June 1975 (aged 24)		(Burkina Faso) Étoile Filante
18	MF	Rahim Ouedraogo	8 October 1980 (aged 19)		(Netherlands) Twente
19	FW	Oumar Barro	3 June 1974 (aged 25)		(Denmark) Brøndby
20	DF	Mahamoudou Kéré	2 January 1982 (aged 18)		(Belgium) Charleroi
21	FW	Abraham Loliga	19 June 1982 (aged 17)		(Burkina Faso) ASFA Yennega
22	GK	Abdoulaye Soulama	29 November 1974 (aged 25)		(Burkina Faso) ASFA Yennega

== Group D ==
=== Nigeria ===
Coach: (Netherlands) Jo Bonfrère

No.	Pos.	Player	Date of birth (age)	Caps	Club
1	GK	Ike Shorunmu	16 October 1967 (aged 32)		(Turkey) Beşiktaş
2	DF	Samuel Okunowo	1 March 1979 (aged 20)		(Portugal) Benfica
3	DF	Celestine Babayaro	29 August 1978 (aged 21)		(England) Chelsea
4	FW	Nwankwo Kanu	1 August 1976 (aged 23)		(England) Arsenal
5	DF	Furo Iyenemi	17 July 1978 (aged 21)		(Switzerland) Sion
6	DF	Taribo West	26 March 1974 (aged 25)		(Italy) Milan
7	MF	Finidi George	15 April 1971 (aged 28)		(Spain) Real Betis
8	MF	Mutiu Adepoju	22 December 1970 (aged 29)		(Spain) Real Sociedad
9	FW	Jonathan Akpoborie	20 October 1968 (aged 31)		(Germany) VfL Wolfsburg
10	MF	Jay-Jay Okocha	14 August 1973 (aged 26)		(France) Paris Saint-Germain
11	MF	Garba Lawal	22 May 1974 (aged 25)		(Netherlands) Roda JC
12	GK	Ndubuisi Egbo	25 July 1973 (aged 26)		(Egypt) Al-Masry
13	FW	Tijani Babangida	25 September 1973 (aged 26)		(Netherlands) Ajax
14	FW	Emmanuel Amuneke	25 December 1970 (aged 29)		(Spain) Barcelona
15	MF	Sunday Oliseh	14 September 1974 (aged 25)		(Italy) Juventus
16	DF	Efe Sodje	5 September 1972 (aged 27)		(England) Luton Town
17	FW	Julius Aghahowa	12 February 1982 (aged 18)		(Tunisia) Espérance
18	FW	Raphael Chukwu	22 July 1975 (aged 24)		(Italy) Bari
19	FW	Benedict Akwuegbu	3 November 1974 (aged 25)		(Austria) Grazer AK
20	FW	Victor Ikpeba	12 June 1973 (aged 26)		(Germany) Borussia Dortmund
21	DF	Godwin Okpara	20 September 1972 (aged 27)		(France) Paris Saint-Germain
22	GK	Murphy Akanji	1 December 1977 (aged 22)		(Nigeria) Julius Berger

=== Tunisia ===
Coach: (Italy) Francesco Scoglio

No.	Pos.	Player	Date of birth (age)	Caps	Club
1	GK	Chokri El Ouaer	15 August 1966 (aged 33)		(Tunisia) Espérance
2	DF	Khaled Badra	8 April 1973 (aged 26)		(Tunisia) Espérance
3	DF	Sami Trabelsi	4 February 1968 (aged 32)		(Tunisia) Sfaxien
4	DF	Mounir Boukadida	24 October 1967 (aged 32)		(Germany) Waldhof Mannheim
5	DF	Hatem Trabelsi	25 January 1977 (aged 23)		(Tunisia) Sfaxien
6	MF	Bechir Mogaadi	8 November 1978 (aged 21)		(Tunisia) Étoile du Sahel
7	MF	Imed Mhedhebi	22 March 1976 (aged 23)		(Tunisia) Étoile du Sahel
8	MF	Zoubeir Baya	15 May 1971 (aged 28)		(Germany) SC Freiburg
9	FW	Ali Zitouni	11 January 1981 (aged 19)		(Tunisia) Espérance
10	MF	Kais Ghodhbane	7 January 1976 (aged 24)		(Tunisia) Étoile du Sahel
11	FW	Adel Sellimi	16 November 1972 (aged 27)		(Germany) SC Freiburg
12	MF	Raouf Bouzaiene	16 October 1970 (aged 29)		(Tunisia) Club Africain
13	MF	Riadh Bouazizi	8 April 1973 (aged 26)		(Tunisia) Étoile du Sahel
14	MF	Sirajeddine Chihi	16 April 1970 (aged 29)		(Tunisia) Espérance
15	DF	Radhi Jaïdi	30 August 1975 (aged 24)		(Tunisia) Espérance
16	GK	Radhouane Salhi	18 February 1967 (aged 33)		(Tunisia) Étoile du Sahel
17	DF	Tarek Thabet	16 August 1971 (aged 28)		(Tunisia) Espérance
18	FW	Maher Kanzari	17 March 1973 (aged 26)		(Tunisia) Espérance
19	MF	Hassan Gabsi	23 February 1974 (aged 25)		(Tunisia) Espérance
20	FW	Ziad Jaziri	12 July 1978 (aged 21)		(Tunisia) Étoile du Sahel
21	FW	Walid Azaiez	25 April 1976 (aged 23)		(Tunisia) Espérance
22	GK	Naceur Bedoui	15 November 1964 (aged 35)		(Tunisia) Sfaxien

=== Morocco ===
Coach: (France) Henri Michel

No.	Pos.	Player	Date of birth (age)	Caps	Club
1	GK	Mustapha Chadili	14 February 1973 (aged 27)		(Morocco) Raja Casablanca
2	DF	Abdelilah Saber	21 April 1974 (aged 25)		(Portugal) Sporting CP
3	DF	Abdelkarim El Hadrioui	6 March 1972 (aged 27)		(Netherlands) AZ
4	DF	Abdelilah Fahmi	3 August 1973 (aged 26)		(France) Lille
5	DF	Rachid Neqrouz	10 April 1972 (aged 27)		(Italy) Bari
6	DF	Noureddine Naybet	10 February 1970 (aged 30)		(Spain) Deportivo La Coruña
7	MF	Mustapha Hadji	16 November 1971 (aged 28)		(England) Coventry City
8	MF	Saïd Chiba	28 September 1970 (aged 29)		(France) Nancy
9	FW	Abdeljalil Hadda	21 March 1972 (aged 27)		(Spain) Sporting de Gijón
10	MF	Adil Ramzi	14 July 1977 (aged 22)		(Netherlands) Willem II
11	MF	Hassan Kachloul	19 February 1973 (aged 27)		(England) Southampton
12	GK	Khalid Fouhami	25 December 1972 (aged 27)		(Romania) Dinamo București
13	FW	Ahmed Bahja	21 December 1970 (aged 29)		(Saudi Arabia) Al-Nasr
14	FW	Salaheddine Bassir	5 September 1972 (aged 27)		(Spain) Deportivo La Coruña
15	DF	Lahcen Abrami	31 December 1969 (aged 30)		(Turkey) Gençlerbirliği
16	MF	Youssef Mariana	13 May 1974 (aged 25)		(Morocco) Kawkab Marrakech
17	MF	Mohamed El Badraoui	27 June 1971 (aged 28)		(Turkey) Bursaspor
18	MF	Youssef Chippo	10 May 1973 (aged 26)		(England) Coventry City
19	FW	Jamal Sellami	6 October 1970 (aged 29)		(Turkey) Beşiktaş
20	DF	Taher El Khalej	16 June 1968 (aged 31)		(Portugal) Benfica
21	MF	Rachid Benmahmoud	14 September 1971 (aged 28)		(United Arab Emirates) Al-Ain FC
22	GK	Abderrafie Gassi	27 October 1972 (aged 27)		(Morocco) FAR Rabat

=== Congo ===
Coach: David Memy

No.	Pos.	Player	Date of birth (age)	Caps	Club
1	GK	Christian Samba	26 March 1971 (aged 28)		(Ivory Coast) Africa Sports
2	DF	Annicet Bitoumbou	2 February 1980 (aged 20)		(Republic of the Congo) Étoile du Congo
3	DF	Luc-Arsène Diamesso	27 December 1974 (aged 25)		(Germany) BV Cloppenburg
4	MF	Jean-Silvestre Nkeoua	31 December 1979 (aged 20)		(Ivory Coast) Africa Sports
5	DF	Camille Oponga	24 January 1978 (aged 22)		(France) Red Star
6	MF	Bedel Moyimbouabeka	8 November 1977 (aged 22)		(Gabon) FC 105 Libreville
7	FW	Richard Bokatola-Lossombo	11 February 1978 (aged 22)		(Germany) Karlsruher SC
8	MF	Rock Embingou	24 September 1968 (aged 31)		(Germany) VfL Halle 96
9	FW	Richard Akiana	20 March 1969 (aged 30)		(France) Red Star
10	DF	Elie Rock Malonga	21 September 1975 (aged 24)		(Germany) BV Cloppenburg
11	MF	Oscar Ewolo	9 October 1978 (aged 21)		(France) Amiens
12	FW	Macchambès Younga-Mouhani	1 August 1974 (aged 25)		(Germany) Fortuna Köln
13	DF	Maurice Ntounou	13 September 1972 (aged 27)		(France) Pacy Vallée-d'Eure
14	MF	Rolf-Christel Guié-Mien	28 October 1977 (aged 22)		(Germany) Eintracht Frankfurt
15	DF	Toussaint Service	1 November 1974 (aged 25)		(Republic of the Congo) Étoile du Congo
16	GK	Thierry Etouayo	29 July 1977 (aged 22)		(Ivory Coast) ASEC Abidjan
17	MF	Modeste Eta	3 February 1981 (aged 19)		(Republic of the Congo) TP Mystère
18	DF	Lucien Fils Ibara	7 September 1974 (aged 25)		(Germany) Bureholzhausen
19	FW	George Ngoma Nanitelamio	7 June 1978 (aged 21)		(Ivory Coast) Sabé Sports
20	FW	Francis Makaya	12 August 1975 (aged 24)		(Germany) VfR Aalen
21	DF	Jules Tchimbakala	15 January 1971 (aged 29)		(France) Le Mans
22	GK	Barel Mouko	5 April 1979 (aged 20)		(Republic of the Congo) CS La Mancha
