= 2002 FIFA World Cup qualification – CAF first round =

Football tournament qualification stage

The CAF first round of 2002 FIFA World Cup qualification was contested between 50 CAF members.

The 50 teams were divided into five pools of ten teams each. In each pool, the ten teams were paired up to play knockout matches on a home-and-away basis. The winners advanced to the second round.

== Pool A ==
Team 1	Agg.	Team 2	1st leg	2nd leg
Mauritania	1–5	Tunisia	1–2	0–3
Guinea-Bissau	0–3	Togo	0–0	0–3
Cape Verde	0–2	Algeria	0–0	0–2
Benin	1–2	Senegal	1–1	0–1
Gambia	0–3	Morocco	0–1	0–2

7 April 2000
17:00 (UTC+0)

Mauritania	1–2	Tunisia
Ould Ely 85'	Report	Jaïdi 65'; Gabsi 76'

Stade Olympique, Nouakchott
Attendance: 10,000
Referee: Modou Sowe (Gambia)
22 April 2000
17:00 (UTC+1)

Tunisia	3–0	Mauritania
Sidibé 16' (o.g.); Jaziri 25'; Mhedhebi 49'	Report

Stade El Menzah, Tunis
Attendance: 3,000
Referee: Mourad Bendada (Morocco)

Tunisia won 5–1 on aggregate.

8 April 2000
16:30 (UTC+0)

Guinea-Bissau	0–0	Togo
	Report

Estádio 24 de Setembro, Bissau
Attendance: 20,000
Referee: Manuel Monteiro Duarte (Cape Verde)
23 April 2000
15:30 (UTC+0)

Togo	3–0	Guinea-Bissau
Salifou 44'; Kouko 65'; Dovi-Akon 87'	Report

Stade de Kégué, Lomé
Attendance: 4,000
Referee: Emmanuel Okoampah (Ghana)

Togo won 3–0 on aggregate.

9 April 2000
15:00 (UTC-1)

Cape Verde	0–0	Algeria
	Report

Estádio da Várzea, Praia
Attendance: 5,000
Referee: Abdou Diouf (Senegal)
21 April 2000
16:00 (UTC+1)

Algeria	2–0	Cape Verde
Bourahli 7'; Saïfi 12'	Report

Stade 19 Mai 1956, Annaba
Attendance: 50,000
Referee: Malick Sillah (Gambia)

Algeria won 2–0 on aggregate.

9 April 2000
16:00 (UTC+1)

Benin	1–1	Senegal
Okétola 33'	Report	N'Diaye 15'

Stade de l'Amitié, Cotonou
Attendance: 17,959
Referee: Olufunmi Orimisan Olaniyan (Nigeria)
23 April 2000
16:30 (UTC+0)

Senegal	1–0	Benin
Ba 63'	Report

Stade Leopold Senghor, Dakar
Attendance: 19,000
Referee: Ba Seydou (Mauritania)

Senegal won 2–1 on aggregate.

9 April 2000
16:00 (UTC+0)

Gambia	0–1	Morocco
	Report	El Moubarki 63'

Independence Stadium, Bakau
Attendance: 20,000
Referee: Mamadouba Camara (Guinea)
22 April 2000
19:30 (UTC+1)

Morocco	2–0	Gambia
El Khattari 17', 31'	Report

Stade Mohamed V, Casablanca
Attendance: 10,800
Referee: Alhabib Ahmad (Libya)

Morocco won 3–0 on aggregate.

== Pool B ==
Team 1	Agg.	Team 2	1st leg	2nd leg
Madagascar	2–1	Gabon	2–0	0–1
Botswana	0–2	Zambia	0–1	0–1
Swaziland	1–8	Angola	0–1	1–7
Lesotho	0–3	South Africa	0–2	0–1
Sudan	2–2 (a)	Mozambique	1–0	1–2

8 April 2000
14:30 (UTC+3)

Madagascar	2–0	Gabon
Randrianaivo 37', 65'	Report

Mahamasina Municipal Stadium, Antananarivo
Attendance: 20,000
Referee: Robin Williams (South Africa)
22 April 2000
16:00 (UTC+1)

Gabon	1–0	Madagascar
Cousin 41'	Report

Stade Omar Bongo, Libreville
Attendance: 5,000
Referee: Benoit Benjamin Mbone Ndinga (Cameroon)

Madagascar won 2–1 on aggregate.

8 April 2000
15:00 (UTC+2)

Botswana	0–1	Zambia
	Report	Lota 40'

Botswana National Stadium, Gaborone
Attendance: 15,000
Referee: Wilfred Mukuna (Zimbabwe)
22 April 2000
15:00 (UTC+2)

Zambia	1–0	Botswana
Milanzi 83'	Report

Independence Stadium, Lusaka
Attendance: 15,000
Referee: Eusebio Alfredo (Mozambique)

Zambia won 2–0 on aggregate.

9 April 2000
15:00 (UTC+2)

Swaziland	0–1	Angola
	Report	Edson 55'

Somhlolo National Stadium, Lobamba
Attendance: 8,600
Referee: Walter Mochubela (South Africa)
23 April 2000
16:00 (UTC+1)

Angola	7–1	Swaziland
Hélder Vicente 18'; Joni 26'; Paulão 29', 72'; Isaac 35', 88'; Covilhã 85'	Report	Dlamini 79'

Estádio da Cidadela, Luanda
Attendance: 50,000
Referee: Edwin Senai (Botswana)

Angola won 8–1 on aggregate.

9 April 2000
15:00 (UTC+2)

Lesotho	0–2	South Africa
	Report	Bartlett 40'; Pule 71'

Setsoto Stadium, Maseru
Attendance: 12,035
Referee: Edwin Senai (Botswana)
22 April 2000
15:00 (UTC+2)

South Africa	1–0	Lesotho
Bartlett 48'	Report

Free State Stadium, Bloemfontein
Attendance: 25,000
Referee: Aaron Nkole (Zambia)

South Africa won 3–0 on aggregate.

9 April 2000
20:00 (UTC+3)

Sudan	1–0	Mozambique
Faroug Jabra 8'	Report

AlHilal Stadium, Omdurman
Attendance: 18,000
Referee: Berhane Teshome (Eritrea)
23 April 2000
15:00 (UTC+2)

Mozambique	2–1	Sudan
Tico-Tico 39', 79'	Report	Mujahid Ahmed 66'

Estádio da Machava, Maputo
Attendance: 7,235
Referee: Felix Tangawarima (Zimbabwe)

2–2 on aggregate, Sudan won on away goals.

== Pool C ==
Team 1	Agg.	Team 2	1st leg	2nd leg
São Tomé and Príncipe	2–4	Sierra Leone	2–0	0–4
Central African Republic	1–4	Zimbabwe	0–1	1–3
Rwanda	2–4	Ivory Coast	2–2	0–2
Equatorial Guinea	2–5	Congo	1–3	1–2
Libya	4–3	Mali	3–0	1–3

8 April 2000
16:00 (UTC+0)

São Tomé and Príncipe	2–0	Sierra Leone
Ramos 36'; Pontes 59'	Report

Estádio Nacional 12 de Julho, Sao Tome
Attendance: 6,500
Referee: Gilbert Njike (Cameroon)
22 April 2000
16:30 (UTC+0)

Sierra Leone	4–0	São Tomé and Príncipe
C.Mansaray 32', 46'; Kanu 58'; S.Mansaray 79'	Report

National Stadium, Freetown
Attendance: 65,000
Referee: Idrissa Kaba (Liberia)

Sierra Leone won 4–2 on aggregate.

8 April 2000
15:00 (UTC+1)

Central African Republic	0–1	Zimbabwe
	Report	Ndlovu 6'

Barthelemy Boganda Stadium, Bangui
Attendance: 13,000
Referee: Ladoual Hisseine (Chad)
23 April 2000
15:00 (UTC+2)

Zimbabwe	3–1	Central African Republic
Ncube 20'; Ndlovu 35'; Jukulile 87'	Report	Djim 39'

National Sports Stadium, Harare
Attendance: 18,951
Referee: Ferdinard Gadaga (Malawi)

Zimbabwe won 4–1 on aggregate.

9 April 2000
15:30 (UTC+2)

Rwanda	2–2	Ivory Coast
Mili 46'; Nsengiyumva 75'	Report	Akassou 45'; Keïta 82'

Stade Amahoro, Kigali
Attendance: 16,000
Referee: Isaack Abdulkadir (Tanzania)
23 April 2000
16:00 (UTC+0)

Ivory Coast	2–0	Rwanda
Bakayoko 35', 66'	Report

Stade Félix Houphouët-Boigny, Abidjan
Attendance: 12,000
Referee: Chukwudi Chukwujekwu (Nigeria)

Ivory Coast won 4–2 on aggregate.

9 April 2000
16:00 (UTC+1)

Equatorial Guinea	1–3	Congo
Eyoma 34'	Report	Ngoma 15'; N'Keoua 29'; Eta 64'

Estadio Internacional, Malabo
Attendance: 5,000
Referee: Pierre Alain Mounguengui (Gabon)
23 April 2000
15:30 (UTC+1)

Congo	2–1	Equatorial Guinea
Moyimbouabeka 7'; Lepaye 81'	Report	Mba 67'

Stade Municipal, Pointe-Noire
Attendance: 12,000
Referee: Gilbert Njike (Cameroon)

Congo won 5–2 on aggregate.

9 April 2000
18:00 (UTC+2)

Libya	3–0	Mali
Muntasser 4'; Al Masli 56'; Mhemed 81'	Report

June 11 Stadium, Tripoli
Attendance: 50,000
Referee: Ferid Sahli (Tunisia)
23 April 2000
17:30 (UTC+0)

Mali	3–1	Libya
Traoré 47', 78'; Dissa 80'	Report	Bushaala 45'

Stade Modibo Kéïta, Bamako
Attendance: 30,000
Referee: Zeli Sinko (Ivory Coast)

Libya won 4–3 on aggregate.

== Pool D ==
Team 1	Agg.	Team 2	1st leg	2nd leg
Djibouti	2–10	DR Congo	1–1	1–9
Seychelles	1–4	Namibia	1–1	0–3
Eritrea	0–4	Nigeria	0–0	0–4
Somalia	0–6	Cameroon	0–3	0–3
Mauritius	2–6	Egypt	0–2	2–4

7 April 2000
16:00 (UTC+3)

Djibouti	1–1	DR Congo
Khaireh 39'	Report	Yemweni 82'

Stade du Ville, Djibouti City
Attendance: 2,700
Referee: Hassan Mohamed Mohamud (Somalia)
23 April 2000
15:30 (UTC+1)

DR Congo	9–1	Djibouti
Mayélé 1', 67'; Yemweni 25', 59', 88'; Nonda 33', 35'; Mazingu-Dinzey 52'; Mpia 78'	Report	Robleh 29'

Stade des Martyrs, Kinshasa
Attendance: 50,000
Referee: Ladoual Hisseine (Chad)

DR Congo won 10–2 on aggregate.

8 April 2000
16:30 (UTC+4)

Seychelles	1–1	Namibia
Zialor 28'	Report	Shivute 20'

Stade Linité, Victoria
Attendance: 3,452
Referee: Pradeep Sohan (Mauritius)
22 April 2000
15:00 (UTC+1)

Namibia	3–0	Seychelles
Tjikuzu 7', 13', 79'	Report

Sam Nujoma Stadium, Windhoek
Attendance: 1,600
Referee: Dominique Urbatro (Réunion)

Namibia won 4–1 on aggregate.

9 April 2000
16:00 (UTC+3)

Eritrea	0–0	Nigeria
	Report

Denden Stadium, Asmara
Attendance: 4,151
Referee: Ahmed Auda (Egypt)
22 April 2000
16:00 (UTC+1)

Nigeria	4–0	Eritrea
Akwuegbu 13'; Lawal 20'; Akpoborie 65'; Kanu 89'	Report

Lagos National Stadium, Lagos
Attendance: 15,000
Referee: Manuel Monteiro Duarte (Cape Verde)

Nigeria won 4–0 on aggregate.

19 April 2000
16:00 (UTC+1)

Somalia	0–3	Cameroon
	Report	Mboma 26'; Foé 31'; Eto'o 37'

Ahmadou Ahidjo Stadium, Yaoundé
Attendance: 35,000
Referee: Thomas Boko (Benin)
23 April 2000
16:00 (UTC+1)

Cameroon	3–0	Somalia
Jama Mba 15', 27'; Olembé 48'	Report

Ahmadou Ahidjo Stadium, Yaoundé
Attendance: 20,000
Referee: Pierre Alain Mounguengui (Gabon)

Cameroon won 6–0 on aggregate.

20 April 2000
19:00 (UTC+3)

Mauritius	0–2	Egypt
	Report	Emara 15'; Farouk 75'

Cairo International Stadium, Cairo
Attendance: 40,000
Referee: Hichem Guirat (Tunisia)
23 April 2000
19:00 (UTC+3)

Egypt	4–2	Mauritius
Kamouna 5' (pen.); Farouk 72', 74'; Salah 90'	Report	Périatambée 45'; Bax 88'

Alexandria Stadium, Alexandria
Attendance: 15,000
Referee: Mohsen Boukthir (Tunisia)

Egypt won 6–2 on aggregate.

== Pool E ==
Team 1	Agg.	Team 2	1st leg	2nd leg
Malawi	2–0	Kenya	2–0	0–0
Tanzania	2–4	Ghana	0–1	2–3
Uganda	4–7	Guinea	4–4	0–3
Ethiopia	2–4	Burkina Faso	2–1	0–3
Chad	0–1	Liberia	0–1	0–0

8 April 2000
15:00 (UTC+2)

Malawi	2–0	Kenya
Somanje 53'; Nkhwazi 88'	Report

Chichiri Stadium, Blantyre
Attendance: 18,000
Referee: Paul Phomane (Lesotho)
22 April 2000
16:00 (UTC+3)

Kenya	0–0	Malawi
	Report

Moi International Sports Centre, Nairobi
Attendance: 25,000
Referee: Jean-Marie Hicuburundi (Burkina Faso)

Malawi won 2–0 on aggregate.

8 April 2000
16:00 (UTC+3)

Tanzania	0–1	Ghana
	Report	Kuffour 21'

Sheikh Amri Abeid Memorial Stadium, Arusha
Attendance: 13,000
Referee: Eusebio Alfredo (Mozambique)
23 April 2000
16:00 (UTC+0)

Ghana	3–2	Tanzania
Kuffour 19'; Ahinful 28'; Addo 64'	Report	Lungu 44'; Abubakari 54'

Ohene Djan Stadium, Accra
Attendance: 15,000
Referee: Abdou Diouf (Senegal)

Ghana won 4–2 on aggregate.

8 April 2000
16:30 (UTC+3)

Uganda	4–4	Guinea
Mubiru 59'; Musisi 73'; Tabula 77'; Kyambadde 89'	Report	Thiam 24'; Youla 55', 83'; Feindouno 88'

Nakivubo Stadium, Kampala
Attendance: 8,609
Referee: Hailemelak Tessema (Ethiopia)
23 April 2000
16:30 (UTC+0)

Guinea	3–0	Uganda
Camara 47'; Feindouno 70', 74'	Report

Stade du 28 Septembre, Conakry
Attendance: 20,000
Referee: Sidi Bekaye Magassa (Mali)

Guinea won 7–4 on aggregate.

9 April 2000
16:00 (UTC+3)

Ethiopia	2–1	Burkina Faso
Alameraw 48'; Getachew 64'	Report	Touré 81'

Addis Ababa Stadium, Addis Ababa
Attendance: 10,544
Referee: Maxim Itur (Kenya)
23 April 2000
16:00 (UTC+0)

Burkina Faso	3–0	Ethiopia
Zongo 3', 37' (pen.); Barro 10'	Report

Stade du 4-Août, Ouagadougou
Attendance: 25,000
Referee: Coffi Codjia (Benin)

Burkina Faso won 4–2 on aggregate.

9 April 2000
19:30 (UTC+1)

Chad	0–1	Liberia
	Report	Sebwe 44'

Stade Nacional, N'Djamena
Attendance: 10,000
Referee: Ibrahim Djingarey (Nigeria)
23 April 2000
16:00 (UTC+0)

Liberia	0–0	Chad
	Report

National Complex, Monrovia
Attendance: 43,000
Referee: Samuel Kamara (Sierra Leone)

Liberia won 1–0 on aggregate.

== Goalscorers ==
There were 130 goals scored in 50 matches, for an average of 2.6 goals per match.

4 goals

- (Democratic Republic of the Congo) Ngidi Yemweni

3 goals

- (Egypt) Mohamed Farouk
- (Guinea) Pascal Feindouno
- (Namibia) Razundara Tjikuzu

2 goals

- (Angola) Isaac Boelua Lokuli
- (Angola) Paulão
- (Burkina Faso) Mamadou Zongo
- (Cameroon) Robert Jama Mba
- (Democratic Republic of the Congo) Jason Mayélé
- (Democratic Republic of the Congo) Shabani Nonda
- (Ghana) Samuel Kuffour
- (Guinea) Souleymane Youla
- (Ivory Coast) Ibrahima Bakayoko
- (Madagascar) Harry Randrianaivo
- (Mali) Brehima Traoré
- (Morocco) Abdelfattah El Khattari
- (Mozambique) Tico-Tico
- (Sierra Leone) Chernor Mansaray
- (South Africa) Shaun Bartlett
- (Zimbabwe) Peter Ndlovu

1 goal

- (Algeria) Isâad Bourahli
- (Algeria) Rafik Saïfi
- (Angola) Victor Covilhã
- (Angola) Felipe Cata Edson
- (Angola) Joni
- (Angola) Hélder Vicente
- (Benin) Jonas Okétola
- (Burkina Faso) Oumar Barro
- (Burkina Faso) Amadou Touré
- (Cameroon) Samuel Eto'o
- (Cameroon) Marc-Vivien Foé
- (Cameroon) Patrick Mboma
- (Cameroon) Salomon Olembé
- (Central African Republic) Luciano Djim
- (Republic of the Congo) Modeste Eta
- (Republic of the Congo) Ulrich Lepaye
- (Republic of the Congo) Bedel Moyimbouabeka
- (Republic of the Congo) Jean-Silvestre N'Keoua
- (Republic of the Congo) George Ngoma Nanitelamio
- (Democratic Republic of the Congo) Michél Mazingu-Dinzey
- (Democratic Republic of the Congo) Lwata Mpia
- (Djibouti) Mahad Khaireh
- (Djibouti) Hared Robleh
- (Egypt) Mohamed Emara
- (Egypt) Samir Kamouna
- (Egypt) Walid Salah Abdel Latif
- (Equatorial Guinea) Remo Eyoma
- (Equatorial Guinea) Casiano Mba
- (Ethiopia) Anteneh Alameraw
- (Ethiopia) Sentayehu Getachew
- (Gabon) Daniel Cousin
- (Ghana) Daniel Addo
- (Ghana) Augustine Ahinful
- (Guinea) Titi Camara
- (Guinea) Pablo Thiam
- (Ivory Coast) Ghislain Akassou
- (Ivory Coast) Fadel Keïta
- (Liberia) Kelvin Sebwe
- (Libya) Ahmed Al Masli
- (Libya) Faisal Bushaala
- (Libya) Khaled Mhemed
- (Libya) Jehad Muntasser
- (Malawi) Jones Nkhwazi
- (Malawi) Dereck Somanje
- (Mali) Yaya Dissa
- (Mauritania) Salem Ould Ely
- (Mauritius) Jean-Sebastien Bax
- (Mauritius) Jacques-Désiré Périatambée
- (Morocco) Bouchaib El Moubarki
- (Namibia) Eliphas Shivute
- (Nigeria) Jonathan Akpoborie
- (Nigeria) Benedict Akwuegbu
- (Nigeria) Nwankwo Kanu
- (Nigeria) Garba Lawal
- (Rwanda) Hassan Mili
- (Rwanda) Julien Nsengiyumva
- (São Tomé and Príncipe) Amilcar Ramos
- (São Tomé and Príncipe) Celso Pontes
- (Senegal) Cheikh Ba
- (Senegal) Moussa N'Diaye
- (Seychelles) Philip Zialor
- (Sierra Leone) Abu Kanu
- (Sierra Leone) Sidique Mansaray
- (South Africa) Jabu Pule
- (Sudan) Mujahid Ahmed
- (Sudan) Faroug Jabra
- (Eswatini) Siza Dlamini
- (Tanzania) Ally Abubakari
- (Tanzania) John Lungu
- (Togo) Togbe Dovi-Akon
- (Togo) Salam Kouko
- (Togo) Moustapha Salifou
- (Tunisia) Hassen Gabsi
- (Tunisia) Radhi Jaïdi
- (Tunisia) Ziad Jaziri
- (Tunisia) Imed Mhedhebi
- (Uganda) Jamil Kyambadde
- (Uganda) Hassan Mubiru
- (Uganda) Majid Musisi
- (Uganda) Abubaker Tabula
- (Zambia) Dennis Lota
- (Zambia) Harry Milanzi
- (Zimbabwe) Luke Jukulile
- (Zimbabwe) Nqobizitha Ncube

1 own goal

- (Mauritania) Bilal Sidibé (against Tunisia)
