= Pape Fall =

Pape Fall may refer to:

- Pape Niokhor Fall (born 1977), Senegalese football midfielder
- Pape Moussa Fall (born 2004), Senegalese football forward for RAAL La Louvière

== See also ==
- Papa Fall (born 1985), Bissau-Guinean football goalkeeper
