= Issa Sanogo =

Issa Sanogo can refer to:

- Issa Sanogo (economist) (born 1970), Ivorian development economist
- Issa Sanogo (footballer) (born 1971), Burkinabé footballer
