= Mohamed Sylla =

Mohamed Sylla is the name of:

- Mohamed Sylla (footballer, born 1971), Guinean footballer
- Mohamed Ofei Sylla (born 1974), Guinean footballer
- Mohamed Sylla (footballer, born 1993), French footballer
- MHD (rapper) (born 1994), French rapper
- Mohamed Sydney Sylla (born 1996), Burkinabé footballer
- Mohamed Sylla (footballer, born 2001), Ivorian footballer

== See also ==
- Mohamed Sillah (born 1949), Sierra Leonean politician
- Mohamed Sillah (footballer) (born 1983), Sierra Leonean footballer
- Mohammed Sylla (born 1977), Guinean footballer
- Mamadou Sylla (disambiguation), various
