= Magan Diabaté =

Burkinabé footballer

Personal information
- Date of birth: 13 November 1973 (age 52)
- Position: Midfielder

International career
Years	Team	Apps	(Gls)
1994–2004	Burkina Faso	33	(2)

Magan Diabaté (born 13 November 1973) is a Burkinabé former footballer who played as a midfielder. He played in 25 matches for the Burkina Faso national team from 1994 to 2004. He was also named in Burkina Faso's squad for the 1998 African Cup of Nations tournament.

== Career statistics ==
=== International ===
Scores and results list Burkina Faso's goal tally first, score column indicates score after each Diabaté goal.

List of international goals scored by Magan Diabaté
No.	Date	Venue	Opponent	Score	Result	Competition
1	16 July 2000	Stade du 4 Août, Ouagadougou, Burkina Faso	Mauritania	3–0	3–0	2002 Africa Cup of Nations qualification
2	30 May 2004	Stade du 4 Août, Ouagadougou, Burkina Faso	Libya	3–2	3–2	Friendly
