= Bijou Kisombe Mundaba =

Congolese footballer

Personal information
- Full name: Bijou Kisombe Mundaba
- Date of birth: 29 September 1976 (age 50)
- Position: Defender

Senior career*
Years	Team	Apps	(Gls)
- AC Sodigraf
–2001	AS Dragons		
2002	Interclube		
2003–2005	AS Vita Club		

International career
1997–2004	DR Congo	29	(1)
Medal record
Representing DR Congo
Men's football
Africa Cup of Nations
Third place	1998 Burkina Faso
- * Club domestic league appearances and goals

Bijou Kisombe Mundaba (born September 29, 1976) is a Congolese football player who last played for AS Vita Club.

He was part of the Congolese team for the 1998 African Nations Cup, 2002 African Nations Cup and 2004 African Nations Cups.

== Career statistics ==
=== International ===
Scores and results list DR Congo's goal tally first, score column indicates score after each Kisombe goal.

List of international goals scored by Bijou Kisombe Mundaba
No.	Date	Venue	Opponent	Score	Result	Competition
1	16 February 1998	Stade du 4 Août, Ouagadougou, Burkina Faso	Ghana	1–0	1–0	1998 Africa Cup of Nations

== Honours ==
DR Congo

- African Cup of Nations: 3rd place, 1998
