= Eddy Bembuana-Keve =

Congolese footballer

Personal information
- Date of birth: 21 December 1972 (age 53)
- Height: 1.82 m (6 ft 0 in)
- Position: Forward

Senior career*
Years	Team	Apps	(Gls)
1989–1992	JS MA FC		
1993–1994	Levallois SC		
1994–1996	Sprimont Comblain		
1996–1997	R.C.S. Verviétois	28	(26)
1997–1999	K.F.C. Lommel	29	(7)
1999–2001	La Louvière	51	(19)
2001–2002	Avellino	24	(4)
2002–2003	Geel	18	(1)

International career
1998	DR Congo	3	(1)
Medal record
Representing DR Congo
Men's football
Africa Cup of Nations
Third place	1998 Burkina Faso
- * Club domestic league appearances and goals

Eddy Bembuana-Keve (born 21 December 1972) is a Congolese former professional footballer who played as a forward. He played in three matches for the DR Congo national team in 1998. He was also named in the DR Congo's squad for the 1998 African Cup of Nations tournament.

== Career statistics ==
=== International ===
Scores and results list DR Congo's goal tally first, score column indicates score after each Bembuana-Keve goal.

List of international goals scored by Eddy Bembuana-Keve
No.	Date	Venue	Opponent	Score	Result	Competition
1	25 February 1998	Stade du 4 Août, Ouagadougou, Burkina Faso	South Africa	1–1	1–2	1998 Africa Cup of Nations

== Honours ==
DR Congo

- African Cup of Nations: 3rd place, 1998
