= Dandou Kibonge Selenge =

Congolese footballer

Personal information
- Date of birth: 30 May 1976 (age 50)
- Height: 1.74 m (5 ft 9 in)
- Position: Midfielder

Senior career*
| Years | Team | Apps | (Gls) |
| 1996–1997 | AC Hemptinne-Eghezée | | |
| 1997–1999 | Charleroi | 42 | (1) |

International career
| 1992–1999 | DR Congo | 13 | (0) |
Medal record
Representing DR Congo
Men's football
Africa Cup of Nations
| Third place | 1998 Burkina Faso |
- * Club domestic league appearances and goals

Dandou Kibonge Selenge (born 30 May 1976) is a Congolese footballer who played as a midfielder. He played in 13 matches for the DR Congo national team from 1992 to 1999. He was also named in the DR Congo's squad for the 1998 African Cup of Nations tournament.

== Honours ==
DR Congo

- African Cup of Nations: 3rd place, 1998
