= Mamadou Sylla =

Mamadou Sylla may refer to:

- Mamadou Sylla (politician) (1960–2026), Guinean politician and business leader
- Mamadou Sylla (footballer, born 1975), Senegalese football defender
- Mamadou Sylla (footballer, born 1986), Senegalese football defender
- Mamadou Sylla (footballer, born 1994), Senegalese football forward
- Mamadou Sylla (footballer, born 2003), Spanish football midfielder
