= Oumar Barro =

Burkinabé footballer (born 1974)

Personal information
- Date of birth: 3 June 1974 (age 52)
- Place of birth: Upper Volta
- Height: 1.74 m (5 ft 9 in)
- Position: Midfielder

Senior career*
Years	Team	Apps	(Gls)
1997–1998	EF Ouagadougou		
1998–1999	Mamelodi Sundowns		
1999–2002	Brøndby	19	(3)
2003–2010	Rail Club Kadiogo		

International career
1996–2003	Burkina Faso	48	(10)
- * Club domestic league appearances and goals

Oumar Barro (born 3 June 1974) is a Burkinabé former professional footballer. A midfielder, Barro gained 29 caps for the Burkina Faso national team, and had a three-year stint with Brøndby of the Danish Superliga between 1999 and 2002.

== Club career ==
After having played in his home country Burkina Faso for EF Ouagadougou and shortly in South Africa for Mamelodi Sundowns, Barro signed a four-year contract with Danish Superliga club Brøndby on 7 September 1999. He had a slow start to his career in Europe, mainly a reserve behind Peter Graulund and Ruben Bagger. In his first start for the club on 2 October 2000, he scored a hat-trick against Haderslev FK. The three goals proved to be his only for the club from Vestegnen, as he terminated his contract by mutual consent on 11 September 2002. He ended his career in his native Burkina Faso with Rail Club Kadiogo.

== International career ==
Barro represented the Burkina Faso national team at the 1998 African Nations Cup tournament, which finished fourth after losing to Congo DR on penalties in the bronze final. He was later part of the 2000 and 2002 African Nations Cup teams, which finished bottom of their respective groups in the first round of competition, thus failing to secure qualification for the quarter-finals. He played 29 matches for national team and scored 5 goals.

== Career statistics ==
=== International ===
Scores and results list Burkina Faso's goal tally first, score column indicates score after each Barro goal.

List of international goals scored by Oumar Barro
No.	Date	Venue	Opponent	Score	Result	Competition	Ref.
1	20 December 1996	Stade de l'Amitié, Cotonou, Benin	Gabon	1–1	1–1	Friendly	
2	22 December 1996	Stade de l'Amitié, Cotonou, Benin	Ghana	1–0	2–1	Friendly	
3	27 February 1998	Stade Municipal, Ouagadougou, Burkina Faso	DR Congo	2–0	4–4	1998 African Cup of Nations	
4	11 January 2000	Stade du 4 Août, Ouagadougou, Burkina Faso	Cameroon	1–1	2–2	Friendly	
5	23 April 2000	Stade du 4 Août, Ouagadougou, Burkina Faso	Ethiopia	2–0	3–0	2002 FIFA World Cup qualification	
6	16 July 2000	Stade du 4 Août, Ouagadougou, Burkina Faso	Mauritania	1–0	3–0	2002 African Cup of Nations qualification	
7	16 July 2000	Stade du 4 Août, Ouagadougou, Burkina Faso	Mauritania	2–0	3–0	2002 African Cup of Nations qualification	
8	3 September 2000	Stade du 5 Juillet, Algiers, Algeria	Algeria	1–0	1–1	2002 African Cup of Nations qualification	
9	16 December 2001	Stade du 4 Août, Ouagadougou, Burkina Faso	Togo	1–0	1–2	Friendly	
10	11 January 2002	Cairo International Stadium, Cairo, Egypt	Egypt	1–2	2–2	Friendly	
