= Ibrahima Tallé =

Burkinabé footballer (born 1968)

Personal information
- Date of birth: 31 March 1968 (age 58)

International career
Years	Team	Apps	(Gls)
1998–2000	Burkina Faso	13	(1)

Ibrahima Tallé (born 31 March 1968) is a Burkinabé footballer. He played in 13 matches for the Burkina Faso national football team from 1998 to 2000. He was also named in Burkina Faso's squad for the 1998 African Cup of Nations tournament.

== Career statistics ==
=== International ===
Scores and results list Burkina Faso's goal tally first, score column indicates score after each Tallé goal.

List of international goals scored by Ibrahima Tallé
No.	Date	Venue	Opponent	Score	Result	Competition
1	27 February 1998	Stade Municipal, Ouagadougou, Burkina Faso	DR Congo	4–1	4–4 (1–4 p)	1998 Africa Cup of Nations
