= Jabu Mahlangu =

South African soccer player (born 1980)

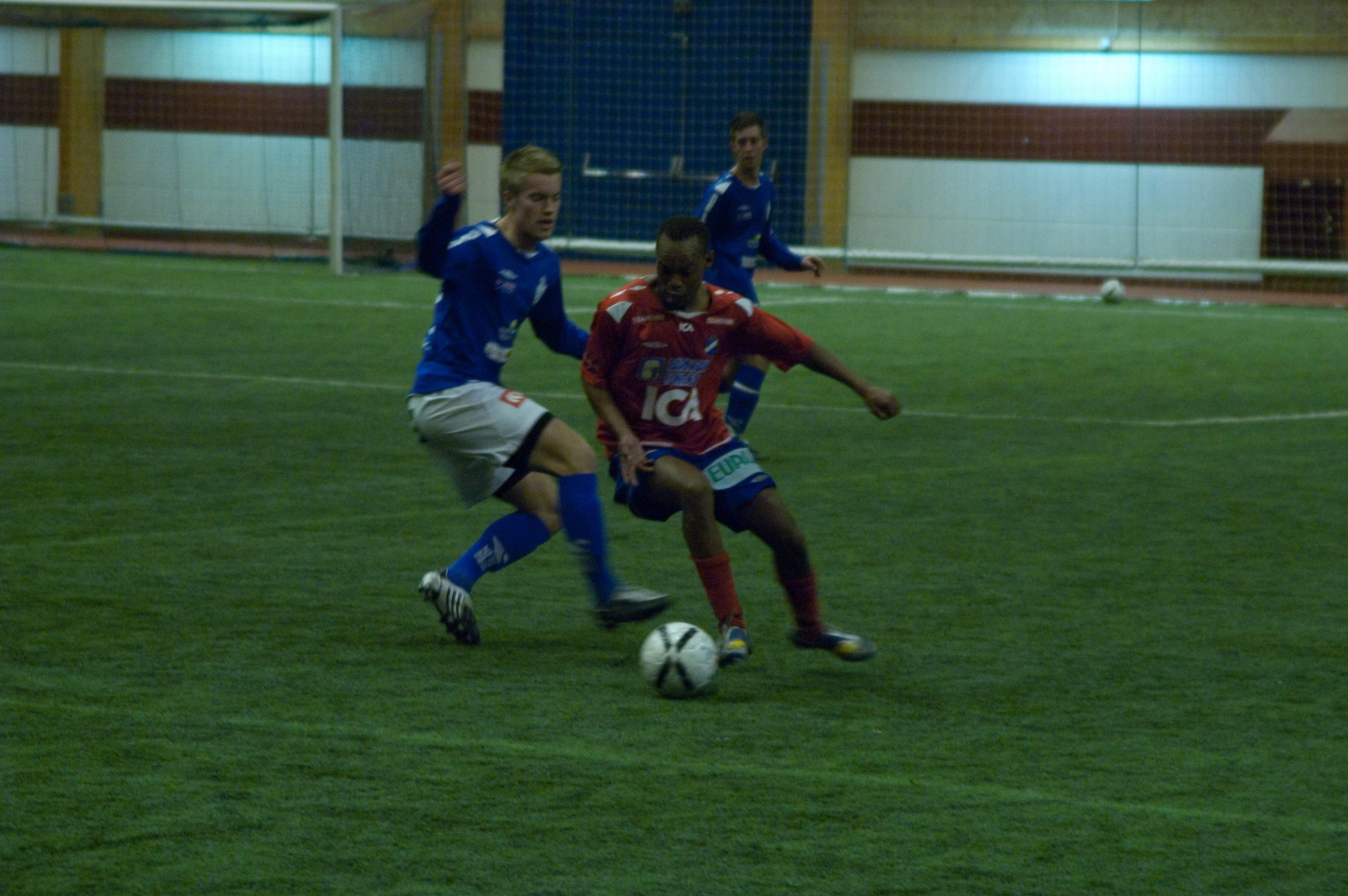

Personal information
- Full name: Jabu Jeremiah Mahlangu
- Birth name: Jabu Jeremiah Pule
- Date of birth: 11 July 1980 (age 46)
- Place of birth: Daveyton, South Africa
- Height: 1.68 m (5 ft 6 in)
- Position: Midfielder

Youth career
- 1991–1999: Kaizer Chiefs

Senior career*
Years	Team	Apps	(Gls)
1999–2004	Kaizer Chiefs	99	(27)
2004–2005	SV Mattersburg	22	(2)
2005–2006	Supersport United	9	(0)
2006–2007	Orlando Pirates	18	(1)
2008	Östers IF	13	(5)
2009	Platinum Stars	12	(2)
2010	Östers IF	22	(1)
2012	FC Cape Town	0	(1)
2014	Supersport United	3	(0)
Total		185	(67)

International career
1999–2000	South Africa U23	17	(1)
2000–2004	South Africa	20	(2)
- * Club domestic league appearances and goals

Jabu Jeremiah Mahlangu (born Jabu Jeremiah Pule on 11 July 1980) is a South African former professional soccer player who played as a midfielder.

== Club career ==
=== South Africa ===
Pule's first club was Kaizer Chiefs, where his contract was terminated in 2003 due to unprofessional conduct. He began trials for SV Mattersburg in Austria, but after eight months, he was asked to leave the club after crashing his car while under the influence of alcohol.

Twice sent to a rehabilitation clinic to overcome his problems with drinking and drugs, Pule was sacked by SuperSport United in late 2005 after missing several training sessions. He was then signed by Orlando Pirates and changed his surname to Mahlangu in early 2006.

=== Sweden ===
Pule left South Africa on 23 June 2008 for trials with Swedish clubs Helsingborgs IF, IF Limhamn Bunkeflo, and Östers IF, after training under the guidance of Farouk Khan at his academy in South Africa.

He completed 13 games for Östers IF in Division 1 Södra as the team came close to promotion into Superettan, with none of the problematic behaviour that had previously marred his career.

On 18 February 2010, Jabu signed a one-year contract with now Superettan newcomers Östers IF.

== International career ==
Jabu made 20 appearances for the South Africa national team from 2000 to 2004, and was a participant at the 2002 FIFA World Cup and at the 2000 Olympic Games. During the team's departure for the World Cup, South African president Thabo Mbeki, while shaking hands with the players to wish them good luck, said to him: "Jabu, you must behave yourself".

He was not selected for the South African squad in the 2010 World Cup in South Africa, due to his behavior.

== Career statistics ==
=== International ===
Appearances and goals by national team and year
National team	Year	Apps	Goals
South Africa
South Africa	2000	5	1
South Africa	2001	0	0
South Africa	2002	7	1
South Africa	2003	3	0
South Africa	2004	5	0
Total		20	2

Scores and results list South Africa's goal tally first, score column indicates score after each Mahlangu goal.

List of international goals scored by Jabu Mahlangu
No.	Date	Venue	Opponent	Score	Result	Competition
1	8 April 2000	Setsoto Stadium, Maseru, Lesotho	Lesotho	2–0	2–0	2002 FIFA World Cup qualification
2	24 August 2002	Peter Mokaba Stadium, Polokwane, South Africa	Swaziland	3–1	4–1	2002 COSAFA Cup
