= John Lungu =

Zambian footballer (born 1966)

Personal information
- Date of birth: 12 June 1966 (age 60)
- Position: Midfielder

Senior career*
Years	Team	Apps	(Gls)
- Roan United

International career
1993–1998	Zambia	34	(0)
- * Club domestic league appearances and goals

John Lungu (born 12 June 1966) is a Zambian former footballer who played as a midfielder. He played in 34 matches for the Zambia national team from 1993 to 1998. He was also named in Zambia's squad for the 1998 African Cup of Nations tournament.
