= Fadel Keïta =

Ivorian footballer

Fadel Keita
Personal information
- Full name: Amidou Fadel Keïta
- Date of birth: 5 July 1977 (age 49)
- Place of birth: Gagnoa, Ivory Coast
- Position: Striker

Senior career*
Years	Team	Apps	(Gls)
1997–2000	Africa Sports		
2000–2001	Çaykur Rizespor	21	(1)
2001–2002	Al-Nassr FC		(2)
2002–2006	Africa Sports		
2009–2010	Feignies		

International career
2000–2001	Ivory Coast	7	(2)
- * Club domestic league appearances and goals

Amidou Fadel Keïta (born 5 July 1977) is an Ivorian former footballer who played as a striker.

== Club career ==
Keïta was born in Gagnoa, Ivory Coast. He began his career at Africa Sports, where he was twice the best goal scorer of the Ivory Coast Championship.

In 2000, he joined Turkish club Çaykur Rizespor and later Al Nassr in Saudi Professional League after their match in the first FIFA Club World Cup

=== Honours ===
Africa Sports: league champion 1999; cup champion 1998, 2002

== International career ==
Keïta played for the Ivory Coast national team during the 2002 FIFA World Cup qualification and scored a goal in a 6–0 win against Madagascar national team on 1 July 2001.

== Personal life ==
Fadel is the older brother of 2006 World Cup player Abdul Kader Keïta. Following his retirement he settled in Lille, France.

== Career statistics ==
=== International ===
Appearances and goals by national team and year
National team	Year	Apps	Goals
Ivory Coast	2000	3	1
Ivory Coast	2001	4	1
Total		7	2

Scores and results list Ivory Coast's goal tally first, score column indicates score after each Keïta goal.

List of international goals scored by Fadel Keïta
No.	Date	Venue	Opponent	Score	Result	Competition
1	9 April 2000	Amahoro Stadium, Kigali, Rwanda	Rwanda	2–2	2–2	2002 FIFA World Cup qualification
2	1 July 2001	Felix Houphouet Boigny Stadium, Abidjan, Ivory Coast	Madagascar	5–0	6–0	2002 FIFA World Cup qualification
