= Franck Doté =

Togolese footballer (born 1975)

Personal information
- Full name: Franck Doté
- Date of birth: 15 December 1975 (age 50)
- Position: Striker

Senior career*
Years	Team	Apps	(Gls)
1998	Mangasport		
2000	Wongosport		
2005–2006	Safa		(1)

International career
1994–2001	Togo	41	(1)
- * Club domestic league appearances and goals

Franck Doté (born 15 December 1975) is a Togolese former footballer who played as a striker. He represented Togo at the 1998 and 2000 Africa Cup of Nations.

He is currently an assistant coach for the Togo national football team. After winning their first ever African Nations Championship game against Uganda in the 2020 African Nations Championship he stated, "A historic and satisfying victory for our young players. We pocketed the three points with the manner, extraordinary goals, and spectacular football. I thank the group for being able to react."

== Career statistics ==
=== International ===
Scores and results list Togo's goal tally first, score column indicates score after each Doté goal.

List of international goals scored by Franck Doté
No.	Date	Venue	Opponent	Score	Result	Competition
1	12 February 1998	Stade du 4 Août, Ouagadougou, Burkina Faso	Ghana	1–0	2–1	1998 Africa Cup of Nations
