= 2000 CAF Cup =

Tournament details
- Dates: 31 January 2000 – 1 December 2000
- Teams: 33

Final positions
- Champions: (Algeria) JS Kabylie (1st title)
- Runners-up: (Egypt) Ismaily

Tournament statistics
- Matches played: 57

The 2000 CAF Cup was the 9th edition of the CAF Cup, the African continental club competition for runners up of the respective domestic leagues. It was won by Algerian team JS Kabylie who beat Ismaily SC of Egypt on the away goals rule in the final, after they finished level on aggregate 1–1.

== Preliminary round ==
Team 1	Agg.	Team 2	1st leg	2nd leg
Chingale de Tete (Mozambique)	1–1 (4–2)	(Equatorial Guinea) Sony Ela Nguema	0–1	1–0

== First round ==
Team 1	Agg.	Team 2	1st leg	2nd leg
Ismaily (Egypt)	7–4	(Libya) Almahalla Tripoli	5–1	2–3
Hay Al-Arab SC (Sudan)	2–0	(Kenya) Shabana Kisii	2–0	0–0
Mtibwa Sugar FC (Tanzania)	5–1	(Botswana) Mochudi Centre Chiefs	3–0	2–1
Cotonsport Garoua (Cameroon)	4–1	(Republic of the Congo) Tout Puissant Mystère	2–0	2–1
Awassa City F.C. (Ethiopia)	2–1	(Rwanda) Mukura Victory	2–0	0–1
Iwuanyanwu Nationale (Nigeria)	5–2	(Gabon) Mbilinga FC	3–0	2–2
Étoile du Sahel (Tunisia)	11–0	(Mozambique) Chingale de Tete	10–0	1–0
Compagnie Sucrière (Senegal)	2–0	(The Gambia) Real Banjul	1–0	1–0
Stade d'Abidjan (Ivory Coast)	w/o^{1}	(Togo) AC Semassi F.C.	—	—
CA Bizertin (Tunisia)	3–2	(Burkina Faso) USFA	2–0	1–2
JS Kabylie (Algeria)	w/o^{1}	(Chad) Aslad Moundou	—	—
TP Mazembe (Democratic Republic of the Congo)	7–2	(Angola) Académica do Lobito	4–0	3–2
Wydad AC (Morocco)	w/o^{1}	(Liberia) Saint Anthony	—	—
USFAS (Mali)	2–3	(Ghana) Cape Coast Dwarfs	2–0	0–3
Kaizer Chiefs (South Africa)	6–2	(Eswatini) Mbabane Highlanders	5–2	1–0
Nchanga Rangers F.C. (Zambia)	2–0	(Madagascar) DSA Antananarivo	1–0	1–0

^{1} AC Semassi, Aslad Moundou and Saint Anthony's withdrew before first leg

== Second round ==
Team 1	Agg.	Team 2	1st leg	2nd leg
Ismaily (Egypt)	w/o^{1}	(Sudan) Hay Al-Arab SC	8–0	—^{1}
Mtibwa Sugar FC (Tanzania)	0–3	(Cameroon) Cotonsport Garoua	0–1	0–2
Awassa City F.C. (Ethiopia)	2–3	(Nigeria) Iwuanyanwu Nationale	1–1	1–2
Étoile du Sahel (Tunisia)	4–2	(Senegal) Compagnie Sucrière	3–0	1–2
Stade d'Abidjan (Ivory Coast)	(a) 4–4	(Tunisia) CA Bizertin	3–0	1–4
JS Kabylie (Algeria)	5–2	(Democratic Republic of the Congo) TP Mazembe	5–0	0–2
Wydad AC (Morocco)	2–3	(Ghana) Cape Coast Dwarfs	2–1	0–2
Kaizer Chiefs (South Africa)	0–2	(Zambia) Nchanga Rangers F.C.	0–2	0–0

^{1} Hay El Arab withdrew after 1st leg

== Quarter-finals ==
Team 1	Agg.	Team 2	1st leg	2nd leg
Stade d'Abidjan (Ivory Coast)	2–1	(Cameroon) Cotonsport Garoua	2–0	0–1
Ismaily (Egypt)	6–0	(Ghana) Cape Coast Dwarfs	4–0	2–0
JS Kabylie (Algeria)	1–1 (4–1 p)	(Tunisia) Étoile du Sahel	1–0	0–1
Nchanga Rangers F.C. (Zambia)	1–2	(Nigeria) Iwuanyanwu Nationale	1–0	0–2

== Semi-finals ==
Team 1	Agg.	Team 2	1st leg	2nd leg
Ismaily (Egypt)	7–0	(Ivory Coast) Stade d'Abidjan	5–0	2–0
Iwuanyanwu Nationale (Nigeria)	1–2	(Algeria) JS Kabylie	1–1	0–1

13 October 2000

Ismaily (Egypt)	5–0	(Ivory Coast) Stade d'Abidjan
Keita 25'; Ibrahim 38'; Abdel Baky 77'; Utaka 83'; Barakat 86' (pen.)

November 5 2000

Stade d'Abidjan (Ivory Coast)	0–2	(Egypt) Ismaily
		Keita; Utaka 83'

Ismaily won 7–0 on aggregate and advanced to the final.

15 October 2000

Iwuanyanwu Nationale (Nigeria)	1–1	(Algeria) JS Kabylie
78' (pen.)		Moussouni 21'

29 October 2001

JS Kabylie (Algeria)	1–0	(Nigeria) Iwuanyanwu Nationale
Moussouni 20'

Stade 5 Juillet 1962, Alger
Attendance: 90,000

JS Kabylie won 2–1 on aggregate and advanced to the final.

== Finals ==
Team 1	Agg.	Team 2	1st leg	2nd leg
Ismaily (Egypt)	1–1 (a)	(Algeria) JS Kabylie	1–1	0–0

=== First leg ===
17 November 2000

Ismaily (Egypt)	1–1	(Algeria) JS Kabylie
Barakat 60' (pen.)	Report	Bendahmane 72'

Ismailia Stadium, Ismaïlia
Attendance: 25,000

=== Second leg ===
1 December 2001

JS Kabylie (Algeria)	0–0	(Egypt) Ismaily

Stade 5 Juillet 1962, Alger
Attendance: 90,000

1–1 on aggregate, JS Kabylie won on away goals rule

== Champions ==
2000 CAF Cup
Winners

JS Kabylie
First Title

== See also ==
- 2000 CAF Champions League
- CAF Cup
