= Ousmane Coulibaly (Burkinabé footballer) =

Burkinabé footballer

Personal information
- Date of birth: 23 February 1969 (age 57)
- Position: Defender

International career
Years	Team	Apps	(Gls)
1994–2001	Burkina Faso	34	(0)

Ousmane Coulibaly (born 23 February 1969) is a Burkinabé football manager and former player. A defender, he made 34 appearances for the Burkina Faso national team from 1994 to 2001. He was also named in Burkina Faso's squad for the 1998 African Cup of Nations tournament.
