= 1998 African Cup of Nations =

21st edition of the Africa Cup of Nations

Coupe d'Afrique des Nations 1998
- Official logo

Tournament details
- Host country: Burkina Faso
- Dates: 7–28 February
- Teams: 16
- Venues: 3 (in 2 host cities)

Final positions
- Champions: Egypt (4th title)
- Runners-up: South Africa
- Third place: DR Congo
- Fourth place: Burkina Faso

Tournament statistics
- Matches played: 32
- Goals scored: 93 (2.91 per match)
- Attendance: 388,800 (12,150 per match)
- Top scorer(s): (Egypt) Hossam Hassan (South Africa) Benni McCarthy (7 goals each)
- Best player: (South Africa) Benni McCarthy

The 1998 African Cup of Nations was the 21st edition of the African Cup of Nations, the international football championship organised by the Confederation of African Football (CAF). It was hosted by Burkina Faso. Just like in 1996, the field of sixteen teams was split into four groups of four.

Egypt won a fourth title, defeating defending champions South Africa 2–0 in the final.

== Qualification ==
Nigeria was banned from participating in the 1998 African Cup of Nations qualifiers because of its withdrawal from the 1996 tournament after it had already qualified for the finals, while the other teams were banned for withdrawing during the 1996 tournament qualifiers.

=== Qualified teams ===
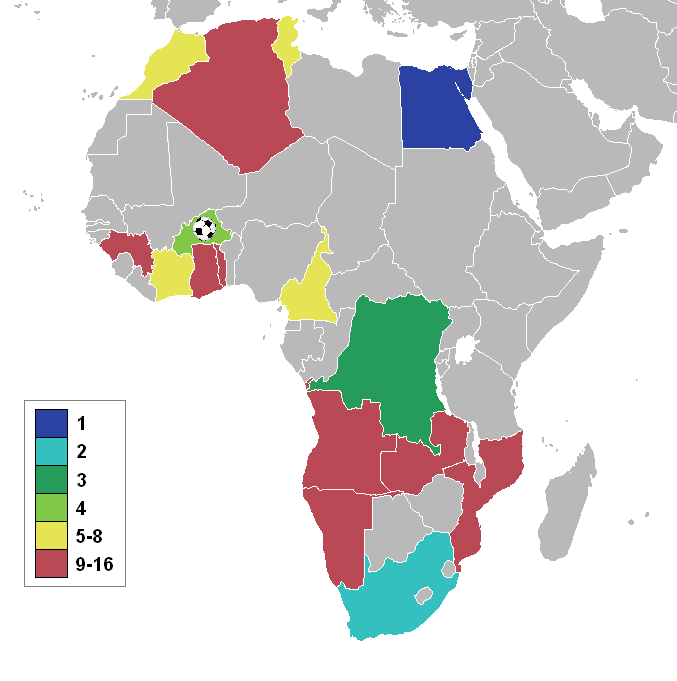
Participating nations

Team	Qualified as	Qualified on	Previous appearances in tournament (Note: Bold indicates champion for that year, Italic indicates host.)
Burkina Faso	Hosts		2 (1978, 1996)
South Africa	Holders	3 February 1996	1 (**1996**)
Ghana	Group 1 winners	13 July 1997	11 (**1963**, **1965**, 1968, 1970, **1978**, 1980, **1982**, 1984, 1992, 1994, 1996)
Guinea	Group 4 runners-up	13 July 1997	5 (1970, 1974, 1976, 1980, 1994)
Tunisia	Group 4 winners	13 July 1997	7 (1962, 1963, 1965, 1978, 1982, 1994, 1996)
Algeria	Group 2 runners-up	27 July 1997	9 (1968, 1980, 1982, 1984, 1986, 1988, **1990**, 1992, 1996)
Angola	Group 6 runners-up	27 July 1997	1 (1996)
Cameroon	Group 5 winners	27 July 1997	9 (1970, 1972, 1982, **1984**, 1986, **1988**, 1990, 1992, 1996)
DR Congo	Group 6 runners-up	27 July 1997	10 (1965, **1968**, 1970, 1972, **1974**, 1976, 1988, 1992, 1994, 1996)
Egypt	Group 3 runners-up	27 July 1997	15 (**1957**, **1959**, 1962, 1963, 1970, 1974, 1976, 1980, 1984, **1986**, 1988, 1990, 1992, 1994, 1996)
Ivory Coast	Group 2 winners	27 July 1997	12 (1965, 1968, 1970, 1974, 1980, 1984, 1986, 1988, 1990, **1992**, 1994, 1996)
Morocco	Group 3 winners	27 July 1997	7 (1972, **1976**, 1978, 1980, 1986, 1988, 1992)
Mozambique	Group 7 runners-up	27 July 1997	2 (1986, 1996)
Namibia	Group 5 runners-up	27 July 1997	0 (debut)
Togo	Group 6 winners	27 July 1997	2 (1972, 1984)
Zambia	Group 7 winners	27 July 1997	8 (1974, 1978, 1982, 1986, 1990, 1992, 1994, 1996)

=== Teams excluded ===
- Gambia
- Guinea-Bissau
- Lesotho
- Madagascar
- Niger
- Nigeria

== Venues ==
Ouagadougou
Stade du 4 Août	Stade Municipal
Capacity: 40,000	Capacity: 30,000
Bobo-Dioulasso	1998 African Cup of Nations is located in Burkina Faso
Stade Municipal	1998 African Cup of Nations is located in Burkina Faso
Capacity: 40,000	1998 African Cup of Nations is located in Burkina Faso

== Group stage ==
=== Group A ===
Pos	Team	Pld	W	D	L	GF	GA	GD	Pts	Qualification
1	Cameroon	3	2	1	0	5	3	+2	7	Advance to knockout stage
2	Burkina Faso (H)	3	2	0	1	3	2	+1	6	Advance to knockout stage
3	Guinea	3	1	1	1	3	3	0	4	
4	Algeria	3	0	0	3	2	5	−3	0	

Source: CAF
(H) Hosts
7 February 1998
16:00

Burkina Faso	0–1	Cameroon
		Tchami 20'

Stade du 4 Août, Ouagadougou
Attendance: 30,000
Referee: Gamal Al-Ghandour (Egypt)
8 February 1998
20:30

Algeria	0–1	Guinea
		Oularé 19'

Stade Municipal, Ouagadougou
Attendance: 3,000
Referee: Lim Kee Chong (Mauritius)

11 February 1998
15:00

Cameroon	2–2	Guinea
Tchami 9'; Womé 44'		Oularé 46', 77'

Stade Municipal, Ouagadougou
Attendance: 2,000
Referee: Young-Joo Kim (South Korea)
11 February 1998
20:00

Burkina Faso	2–1	Algeria
K. Ouédraogo 65' (pen.); Traoré 77'		Saïb 82' (pen.)

Stade du 4 Août, Ouagadougou
Attendance: 35,000
Referee: Pierre Mounguegui (Gabon)

15 February 1998
16:00

Burkina Faso	1–0	Guinea
Kambou 85'

Stade du 4 Août, Ouagadougou
Attendance: 40,000
Referee: Omer Yengo (Congo)
15 February 1998
16:00

Cameroon	2–1	Algeria
Job 47'; Tchami 65'		Dziri 40'

Stade Municipal, Ouagadougou
Attendance: 1,000
Referee: Kine Tibebu (Ethiopia)

=== Group B ===
Pos	Team	Pld	W	D	L	GF	GA	GD	Pts	Qualification
1	Tunisia	3	2	0	1	5	4	+1	6	Advance to knockout stage
2	DR Congo	3	2	0	1	4	3	+1	6	Advance to knockout stage
3	Ghana	3	1	0	2	3	3	0	3	
4	Togo	3	1	0	2	4	6	−2	3	

Source: CAF
9 February 1998
16:00

DR Congo	2–1	Togo
Tondelua 57' (pen.), 73' (pen.)		Tchangai 90'

Stade Municipal, Ouagadougou
Attendance: 4,000
Referee: Said Belqola (Morocco)
9 February 1998
20:30

Ghana	2–0	Tunisia
Nyarko 8'; Gargo 90'

Stade du 4 Août, Ouagadougou
Attendance: 12,000
Referee: Ian McLeod (South Africa)

12 February 1998
16:00

Tunisia	2–1	DR Congo
Ben Slimane 31'; Tlemcani 76'		Kimoto 36'

Stade Municipal, Ouagadougou
Attendance: 1,000
Referee: Kine Tibebu (Ethiopia)
12 February 1998
20:30

Togo	2–1	Ghana
Doté 26'; Kader 90'		Johnson 83' (pen.)

Stade du 4 Août, Ouagadougou
Attendance: 3,000
Referee: Omer Yengo (Congo)

16 February 1998
17:00

DR Congo	1–0	Ghana
Kisombe 77'

Stade du 4 Août, Ouagadougou
Attendance: 3,000
Referee: Young-Joo Kim (South Korea)
16 February 1998
17:00

Tunisia	3–1	Togo
Tlemcani 9'; Ben Slimane 12'; Gabsi 80'		Assignon 4' (pen.)

Stade Municipal, Ouagadougou
Attendance: 800
Referee: Pierre Mounguegui (Gabon)

=== Group C ===
Pos	Team	Pld	W	D	L	GF	GA	GD	Pts	Qualification
1	Ivory Coast	3	2	1	0	10	6	+4	7	Advance to knockout stage
2	South Africa	3	1	2	0	5	2	+3	5	Advance to knockout stage
3	Angola	3	0	2	1	5	8	−3	2	
4	Namibia	3	0	1	2	7	11	−4	1	

Source: CAF
8 February 1998
15:00

South Africa	0–0	Angola

Stade Municipal, Bobo-Dioulasso
Attendance: 20,000
Referee: Sidi Bekaye Magassa (Mali)
8 February 1998
18:00

Ivory Coast	4–3	Namibia
Tiéhi 2', 39'; Bakayoko 34'; Diabaté 83'		Shivute 46', 73'; Mannetti 70'

Stade Municipal, Bobo-Dioulasso
Attendance: 20,000
Referee: Karim Dahou (Algeria)

11 February 1998
17:15

Ivory Coast	1–1	South Africa
Ouattara 88'		Mkhalele 8' (pen.)

Stade Municipal, Bobo-Dioulasso
Attendance: 10,000
Referee: Charles Masembe (Uganda)
12 February 1998
18:15

Angola	3–3	Namibia
Lázaro 46'; Paulo Silva 67' (pen.); Miguel Pereira 86'		Uri Khob 20', 51'; Nauseb 33'

Stade Municipal, Bobo-Dioulasso
Attendance: 2,000
Referee: Falla N'Doye (Senegal)

16 February 1998
20:00

Ivory Coast	5–2	Angola
Guel 8', 23'; Tiéhi 43', 81' (pen.); Bakayoko 56'		Paulo Silva 27'; Quinzinho 52'

Stade Municipal, Ouagadougou
Attendance: 4,000
Referee: Maxime Camara (Guinea)
16 February 1998
20:00

South Africa	4–1	Namibia
McCarthy 8', 11', 19', 21'		Uutoni 68'

Stade Municipal, Bobo-Dioulasso
Attendance: 9,500
Referee: Karim Dahou (Algeria)

=== Group D ===
Pos	Team	Pld	W	D	L	GF	GA	GD	Pts	Qualification
1	Morocco	3	2	1	0	5	1	+4	7	Advance to knockout stage
2	Egypt	3	2	0	1	6	1	+5	6	Advance to knockout stage
3	Zambia	3	1	1	1	4	6	−2	4	
4	Mozambique	3	0	0	3	1	8	−7	0	

Source: CAF
9 February 1998
18:15

Morocco	1–1	Zambia
Bahja 37'		Chilumba 87'

Stade Municipal, Bobo-Dioulasso
Attendance: 10,000
Referee: Abdul Rahman Al-Zaid (Saudi Arabia)
10 February 1998
18:00

Egypt	2–0	Mozambique
H. Hassan 14', 44'

Stade Municipal, Bobo-Dioulasso
Attendance: 20,000
Referee: Maxime Camara (Guinea)

13 February 1998
17:00

Egypt	4–0	Zambia
H. Hassan 34', 57', 71'; Radwan 80'

Stade Municipal, Bobo-Dioulasso
Attendance: 5,000
Referee: Kim Milton Nielsen (Denmark)
13 February 1998
20:00

Morocco	3–0	Mozambique
Chiba 39'; El Khattabi 40'; Fertout 82'

Stade Municipal, Bobo-Dioulasso
Attendance: 3,000
Referee: Lucien Bouchardeau (Niger)

17 February 1998
16:00

Zambia	3–1	Mozambique
Kilambe 16'; Bwalya 43'; Tembo 73'		Avelino 57'

Stade Municipal, Bobo-Dioulasso
Attendance: 3,000
Referee: Falla N'Doye (Senegal)
17 February 1998
16:00

Morocco	1–0	Egypt
Hadji 90'

Stade Municipal, Ouagadougou
Attendance: 500
Referee: Kim Milton Nielsen (Denmark)

== Knockout stage ==
=== Bracket ===
Quarter-finals
20 February – Bobo-Dioulasso
Cameroon	0
DR Congo	1
22 February – Ouagadougou
Morocco	1
South Africa	2
21 February – Ouagadougou
Tunisia	1 (7)
Burkina Faso (p)	1 (8)
21 February – Ouagadougou
Ivory Coast	0 (4)
Egypt (p)	0 (5)

Semi-finals
25 February – Ouagadougou
DR Congo	1
South Africa (g.g.)	2
25 February – Bobo-Dioulasso
Burkina Faso	0
Egypt	2

Final
28 February – Ouagadougou
South Africa	0
Egypt	2
Third place
27 February – Ouagadougou
DR Congo (p)	4 (4)
Burkina Faso	4 (1)

=== Quarter-finals ===
20 February 1998
16:00

Cameroon	0–1	DR Congo
		Tondelua 30'

Stade Municipal, Bobo-Dioulasso
Attendance: 5,000
Referee: Abdul Rahman Al-Zaid (Saudi Arabia)

21 February 1998
17:00

Tunisia	1–1 (a.e.t.)	Burkina Faso
Gabsi 89'		K. Ouédraogo 45' (pen.)
Penalties
Rouissi (penalty scored); Badra (penalty scored); Bouazizi (penalty scored); Chihi (penalty missed); Jelassi (penalty scored); Baya (penalty missed); Gabsi (penalty scored); Ghodhbane (penalty scored); Hicheri (penalty scored); Trabelsi (penalty missed)	7–8	(penalty scored) S. Traoré; (penalty scored) F. Sanou; (penalty scored) Nana; (penalty missed) Tallé; (penalty scored) A. Ouédraogo; (penalty missed) Zongo; (penalty scored) B. Traoré; (penalty scored) Diabaté; (penalty scored) Liade Gnonka; (penalty scored) Coulibaly

Stade du 4 Août, Ouagadougou
Attendance: 37,000
Referee: Lim Kee Chong (Mauritius)

21 February 1998
20:00

Ivory Coast	0–0 (a.e.t.)	Egypt
Penalties
Domoraud (penalty scored); Guel (penalty scored); Diomandé (penalty missed); Bakayoko (penalty scored); Ouattara (penalty scored)	4–5	(penalty scored) Ramzy; (penalty scored) Radwan; (penalty scored) Kamouna; (penalty scored) Mostafa; (penalty scored) Imam

Stade Municipal, Ouagadougou
Attendance: 7,000
Referee: Ian McLeod (South Africa)

22 February 1998
16:00

Morocco	1–2	South Africa
Chiba 36'		McCarthy 22'; Nyathi 79'

Stade Municipal, Ouagadougou
Attendance: 3,000
Referee: Lucien Bouchardeau (Niger)

=== Semi-finals ===
25 February 1998
16:00

DR Congo	1–2 (a.e.t./g.g.)	South Africa
Bembuana-Keve 48'		McCarthy 60', 112'

Stade du 4 Août, Ouagadougou
Attendance: 2,000
Referee: Charles Masembe (Uganda)

25 February 1998
20:00

Burkina Faso	0–2	Egypt
		H. Hassan 40', 71'

Stade Municipal, Bobo-Dioulasso
Attendance: 35,000
Referee: Kim Milton Nielsen (Denmark)

=== Third place match ===
27 February 1998
16:00

DR Congo	4–4 (a.e.t.)	Burkina Faso
Mungongo 76', 90'; Kasongo 88'; Tondelua 89'		A. Ouédraogo 6'; Barro 52'; Napon 56'; Tallé 86'
Penalties
Simba (penalty scored); Mamale (penalty scored); Kisombe (penalty scored); Selenge (penalty scored)	4–1	(penalty missed) S. Traoré; (penalty scored) F. Sanou; (penalty missed) Diabaté

Stade Municipal, Ouagadougou
Attendance: 25,000
Referee: Gamal Al-Ghandour (Egypt)

=== Final ===
28 February 1998
16:00

South Africa	0–2	Egypt
		A. Hassan 5'; Mostafa 13'

Stade du 4 Août, Ouagadougou
Attendance: 33,000
Referee: Said Belqola (Morocco)

== Statistics ==
=== Goalscorers ===
There were 93 goals scored in 32 matches, for an average of 2.91 goals per match.

7 goals

- (Egypt) Hossam Hassan
- (South Africa) Benni McCarthy

4 goals

- (Democratic Republic of the Congo) Jerry Tondelua
- (Ivory Coast) Joël Tiéhi

3 goals

- (Cameroon) Alphonse Tchami
- (Guinea) Souleymane Oularé

2 goals

- (Angola) Paulo Silva
- (Burkina Faso) Kassoum Ouédraogo
- (Democratic Republic of the Congo) Lokenge Mungongo
- (Ivory Coast) Ibrahima Bakayoko
- (Ivory Coast) Tchiressoua Guel
- (Morocco) Saïd Chiba
- (Namibia) Eliphas Shivute
- (Namibia) Gervatius Uri Khob
- (Tunisia) Mehdi Ben Slimane
- (Tunisia) Hassen Gabsi
- (Tunisia) Ziad Tlemçani

1 goal

- (Algeria) Billel Dziri
- (Algeria) Moussa Saïb
- (Angola) Lázaro
- (Angola) Miguel Pereira
- (Angola) Quinzinho
- (Burkina Faso) Oumar Barro
- (Burkina Faso) Romeo Kambou
- (Burkina Faso) Sidi Napon
- (Burkina Faso) Alassane Ouédraogo
- (Burkina Faso) Ibrahima Tallé
- (Burkina Faso) Seydou Traoré
- (Cameroon) Joseph-Désiré Job
- (Cameroon) Pierre Womé
- (Democratic Republic of the Congo) Eddy Bembuana-Keve
- (Democratic Republic of the Congo) Jean-Kasongo Banza
- (Democratic Republic of the Congo) Okitankoyi Kimoto
- (Democratic Republic of the Congo) Mundaba Kisombe
- (Ivory Coast) Lassina Diabaté
- (Ivory Coast) Ahmed Ouattara
- (Egypt) Ahmed Hassan
- (Egypt) Tarek Mostafa
- (Egypt) Yasser Radwan
- (Ghana) Mohammed Gargo
- (Ghana) Samuel Johnson
- (Ghana) Alex Nyarko
- (Morocco) Ahmed Bahja
- (Morocco) Ali Elkhattabi
- (Morocco) Youssef Fertout
- (Morocco) Mustapha Hadji
- (Mozambique) Avelino
- (Namibia) Ricardo Mannetti
- (Namibia) Robert Nauseb
- (Namibia) Simon Uutoni
- (South Africa) Helman Mkhalele
- (South Africa) David Nyathi
- (Togo) Komlan Assignon
- (Togo) Franck Doté
- (Togo) Massamasso Tchangai
- (Togo) Mohamed Coubadja Touré
- (Zambia) Kalusha Bwalya
- (Zambia) Tenant Chilumba
- (Zambia) Rotson Kilambe
- (Zambia) Masauso Tembo

=== Team of the Tournament ===
The following eleven players were chosen as the CAF Team of the Tournament for the 1998 African Cup of Nations.

Goalkeeper	Defenders	Midfielders	Forwards
(Egypt) Nader El-Sayed	(South Africa) Mark Fish (Mozambique) Jojo (Morocco) Noureddine Naybet (Egypt) Mohamed Emara	(Ghana) Charles Akonnor (Tunisia) Hassen Gabsi (Ivory Coast) Tchiressoua Guel (Democratic Republic of the Congo) Didier Ekanza Simba	(Egypt) Hossam Hassan (South Africa) Benni McCarthy

=== Tournament rankings ===
Ranking criteria
Teams are ranked according to the round in which they were eliminated, with the teams eliminated in the same round ranked according to their results and goal difference in that round.

Pos.	Team	G	Pld	W	D	L	Pts	GF	GA	GD
1	Egypt	D	6	4	1	1	13	10	1	+9
2	South Africa	C	6	3	2	1	11	9	6	+3
3	DR Congo	B	6	3	1	2	10	10	9	+1
4	Burkina Faso	A	6	2	2	2	8	8	9	−1
Eliminated in the quarter-finals
5	Ivory Coast	C	4	2	2	0	8	10	6	+4
6	Morocco	D	4	2	1	1	7	6	3	+3
7	Tunisia	B	4	2	1	1	7	6	5	+1
8	Cameroon	A	4	2	1	1	7	5	4	+1
Eliminated in the group stage
9	Guinea	A	3	1	1	1	4	3	3	0
10	Zambia	D	3	1	1	1	4	4	6	−2
11	Ghana	B	3	1	0	2	3	3	3	0
12	Togo	B	3	1	0	2	3	4	6	−2
13	Angola	C	3	0	2	1	2	5	8	−3
14	Namibia	C	3	0	1	2	1	7	11	−4
15	Algeria	A	3	0	0	3	0	2	5	−3
16	Mozambique	D	3	0	0	3	0	1	8	−7
