= Alassane Ouédraogo =

Burkinabé footballer

Personal information
- Date of birth: 7 September 1980 (age 46)
- Place of birth: Boussouma, Upper Volta
- Height: 1.73 m (5 ft 8 in)
- Position: Midfielder

Youth career
- Santos de Ouagadougou

Senior career*
Years	Team	Apps	(Gls)
1996–2000	Charleroi	54	(4)
2000–2003	1. FC Köln	3	(0)
2003–2005	Rot-Weiß Oberhausen	60	(7)
2005–2009	TuS Koblenz	24	(1)
2010	Rot-Weiß Essen	15	(0)
2010–2012	Fortuna Köln	24	(3)
Total		180	(15)

International career
1998–2007	Burkina Faso	33	(7)
- * Club domestic league appearances and goals

Alassane Ouédraogo (born 7 September 1980) is a Burkinabe former professional football midfielder. He is the father of footballer Assan Ouédraogo.

== Club career ==
He signed for Regionalliga West club Rot-Weiß Essen in January 2010, following a trial at the club.

In June 2010, he signed for Fortuna Köln on a two-year contract. He suffered an adductor injury in March 2011. In April 2012, it was announced that he would be released at the end of the season.

In March 2016, Ouédraogo signed for VfB Speldorf.

He left Speldorf in summer 2018, and joined lower-league club FSV Kettwig in December 2018.

== International career ==
Ouédraogo was a member of the Burkina Faso national team, having played 33 games and scoring 7 goals.

== Career statistics ==
=== International ===
Scores and results list Burkina Faso's goal tally first, score column indicates score after each Ouédraogo goal.

List of international goals scored by Nii Lamptey
No.	Date	Venue	Opponent	Score	Result	Competition
1	4 January 1998	Stade Wobi Bobo-Dioulasso, Bobo-Dioulasso, Burkina Faso	Mozambique	1–0	1–0	Friendly
2	7 January 1998	Stade du 4 Août, Ouagadougou, Burkina Faso	Mozambique	3–0	4–2	Friendly
3	27 February 1998	Stade Municipal, Ouagadougou, Burkina Faso	DR Congo	1–0	4–4 (1–4 p)	1998 Africa Cup of Nations
4	29 January 2000	Sani Abacha Stadium, Kano, Nigeria	Zambia	1–1	1–1	2000 Africa Cup of Nations
5	7 January 2001	Stade de Kégué, Lomé, Togo	Togo	1–1	1–1	Friendly
6	11 January 2002	Cairo International Stadium, Cairo, Egypt	Egypt	2–2	2–2	Friendly
7	13 June 2004	Stade du 4 Août, Ouagadougou, Burkina Faso	Benin	4–2	4–2	Friendly
