= Lokenge Mungongo =

Congolese footballer

Personal information
- Date of birth: 8 October 1978 (age 48)

International career
| Years | Team | Apps | (Gls) |
| 1998–2001 | DR Congo | 7 | (2) |
Medal record
Representing DR Congo
Men's football
Africa Cup of Nations
| Third place | 1998 Burkina Faso |

Lokenge Mungongo (born 8 October 1978) is a Congolese footballer. He played in seven matches for the DR Congo national football team from 1997 to 1999. He was also named in the DR Congo's squad for the 1998 African Cup of Nations tournament.

== Career statistics ==
=== International ===
Scores and results list DR Congo's goal tally first, score column indicates score after each Mungongo goal.

List of international goals scored by Lokenge Mungongo
| No. | Date | Venue | Opponent | Score | Result | Competition |
|---|---|---|---|---|---|---|
| 1 | 27 February 1998 | Stade Municipal, Ouagadougou, Burkina Faso | Burkina Faso | 1–3 | 4–4 (4–1 p) | 1998 Africa Cup of Nations |
| 2 | 27 February 1998 | Stade Municipal, Ouagadougou, Burkina Faso | Burkina Faso | 4–4 | 4–4 (4–1 p) | 1998 Africa Cup of Nations |

== Honours ==
DR Congo

- African Cup of Nations: 3rd place, 1998
