= Sidi Napon =

Burkinabé footballer (born 1972)

Personal information
- Date of birth: 29 August 1972 (age 54)
- Position: Midfielder

Senior career*
| Years | Team | Apps | (Gls) |
| 1993–1996 | ES Viry-Châtillon | 40 | (2) |
| 1997–1998 | AS Évry | 1 | (0) |

International career
| 1995–1998 | Burkina Faso | 9 | (2) |
- * Club domestic league appearances and goals

Sidi Napon (born 29 August 1972) is a Burkinabé former footballer who played as a midfielder. He made nine appearances for the Burkina Faso national team from 1995 to 1998. He was also named in Burkina Faso's squad for the 1998 African Cup of Nations tournament.

== Career statistics ==
=== International ===
Scores and results list Burkina Faso's goal tally first, score column indicates score after each Napon goal.

List of international goals scored by Sidi Napon
| No. | Date | Venue | Opponent | Score | Result | Competition |
|---|---|---|---|---|---|---|
| 1 | 22 January 1995 | Felix Houphouet Boigny Stadium, Abidjan, Ivory Coast | Ivory Coast | 1–2 | 2–2 | 1996 Africa Cup of Nations qualification |
| 4 | 27 February 1998 | Stade Municipal, Ouagadougou, Burkina Faso | DR Congo | 3–0 | 4–4 (1–4 p) | 1998 Africa Cup of Nations |
