= Didier Ekanza Simba =

Congolese footballer

Personal information
- Date of birth: 9 August 1969 (age 57)
- Place of birth: Kinshasa, DR Congo
- Height: 1.77 m (5 ft 10 in)
- Position: Midfielder

Senior career*
Years	Team	Apps	(Gls)
–1992	AS Vita Club		
1992–1997	Beerschot		
1997–2000	Beveren		
2000–2001	K.F.C. Schoten S.K.		
2001–2002	Hapoel Beit She'an		
2002–2003	Maccabi Petah Tikva		
2003–2004	KFCO Wilrijk		

International career
1991–1999	DR Congo	25	(3)
Medal record
Representing DR Congo
Men's football
Africa Cup of Nations
Third place	1998 Burkina Faso
- * Club domestic league appearances and goals

Didier Ekanza Simba (born 9 August 1969) is a Congolese former professional footballer who played as a midfielder. He was a squad member at the 1992, 1994 and 1998 Africa Cup of Nations.

== Career statistics ==
=== International ===
Appearances and goals by national team and year
National team	Year	Apps	Goals
DR Congo	1991	2	0
DR Congo	1992	2	0
DR Congo	1993	2	1
DR Congo	1994	1	0
DR Congo	1995	–	
DR Congo	1996	2	0
DR Congo	1997	7	1
DR Congo	1998	7	1
DR Congo	1999	2	0
Total		25	3

Scores and results list DR Congo's goal tally first, score column indicates score after each Simba goal.

List of international goals scored by Didier Ekanza Simba
No.	Date	Venue	Opponent	Score	Result	Competition
1	25 July 1993	Stade des Martyrs, Kinshasa, Zaire	Lesotho	5–0	7–0	1994 Africa Cup of Nations qualification
2	23 February 1997	Stade Municipal, Lomé, Togo	Togo	1–0	1–1	1998 Africa Cup of Nations qualification
3	4 October 1998	Independence Stadium, Lusaka, Zambia	Zambia	1–0	1–1	2000 Africa Cup of Nations qualification

== Honours ==
DR Congo

- African Cup of Nations: 3rd place, 1998
