= Papa Daouda Sène =

Senegalese footballer

Personal information
- Date of birth: 18 November 1976 (age 49)
- Position: Midfielder

Senior career*
Years	Team	Apps	(Gls)
1999–2000	CA Bizertin		
- ASC Jeanne d'Arc
- ASC HLM

International career
1999–2000	Senegal	7	(1)
- * Club domestic league appearances and goals

Papa Daouda Sène (born 18 November 1976) is a Senegalese former professional footballer who played as a midfielder. He made seven appearances for the Senegal national team in 1999 and 2000. He was also named in Senegal's squad for the 2000 African Cup of Nations tournament.
