= Camille Oponga =

Congolese footballer

Personal information
- Full name: Herman Camille Oponga Ayessa
- Date of birth: January 24, 1978 (age 48)
- Place of birth: Brazzaville, People's Republic of the Congo
- Height: 1.85 m (6 ft 1 in)
- Position: Defender

Senior career*
Years	Team	Apps	(Gls)
1996–2001	Red Star Saint-Ouen	85	(0)
2001–02	Falkirk	3	(0)
2002–04	Pau FC	59	(1)
2004–2005	Cannes	37	(2)
2006–2008	Pacy Vallée-d'Eure	74	(0)
2008–2009	Villemomble Sports	27	(0)
2009–2011	ES Viry-Châtillon	50	(1)
Total		335	(4)

International career
2000–2006	Republic of the Congo	9	(0)
- * Club domestic league appearances and goals

Herman Camille Oponga Ayessa (born January 24, 1978, in Brazzaville) is a Congolese former professional footballer who played as a defender.
