= Lucien Fils Ibara =

Congolese footballer

Personal information
- Date of birth: 7 September 1974 (age 52)
- Position: Defender

Senior career*
Years	Team	Apps	(Gls)
- Patronage Sainte-Anne
1994–1995	VfB Wissen	19	(1)
1995–1996	SpVgg Bad Homburg		
1996–1997	VfL Herzlake		

International career
1992–1999	Congo	20	(1)
- * Club domestic league appearances and goals

Lucien Fils Ibara (born 7 September 1974) is a Congolese footballer. He played in 22 matches for the Congo national football team from 1992 to 1999. He was also named in Congo's squad for the 2000 African Cup of Nations tournament.
