= Madou Dossama =

Burkinabé footballer

- Occupation: Footballer
- Employer: Burkinabé National Team

Madou Dossama (born 24 July 1972) is a retired Burkinabé footballer who played for Etoile Filante Ouagadougou and the national team.

== Career ==
Dossama captained his club side EFO to the 1/16-finals of the 2004 CAF Confederation Cup, and became an assistant coach after he retired from playing.

He was part of the Burkinabé 2000 and 2002 African Nations Cup teams, who finished bottom of their groups in the first round of competition, thus failing to secure qualification for the quarter-finals.
