= TP Mystère =

- Full name: Tout Puissant Mystère
- League: Congo Second Division

Tout Puissant Mystère or simply TPMystère is an African football club based in Republic of the Congo.

The team plays in the Congo Second Division.

== Performance in CAF competitions ==
- CAF Cup: 1 appearance

2000: First Round
