= Emmanuel Misichili =

Zambian footballer (born 1978)

Personal information
- Date of birth: 6 June 1978 (age 48)

International career
Years	Team	Apps	(Gls)
1998–2000	Zambia	2	(0)

Emmanuel Misichili (born 6 June 1978) is a Zambian footballer. He played in two matches for the Zambia national football team in 1998 and 2000. He was also named in Zambia's squad for the 2000 African Cup of Nations tournament.
