= Michel Souamas =

Gabonese footballer

Michel Souamas (born 26 February 1975) is a Gabonese former professional footballer who played as a goalkeeper.

During his career, Souamas played for Petrosport (1994–2002), US Bitam (2002–03), Tout Puissant Akwembe (2003–04) and FC 105 Libreville (2006–07), retiring in 2007.

He was a Gabonese international on five occasions, from 1997–2000, and appeared – as third-choice – at the 2000 African Cup of Nations.
