= Annicet Bitoumbou =

Congolese footballer

Personal information
- Date of birth: 2 February 1980 (age 46)
- Position: Defender

International career
| Years | Team | Apps | (Gls) |
| 1998–2000 | Congo | 10 | (0) |

Annicet Bitoumbou (born 2 February 1980) is a Congolese former footballer who played as a defender. He made ten appearances for the Congo national team from 1998 to 2000. He was also named in Congo's squad for the 2000 African Cup of Nations tournament.
