= Jonas Okétola =

Footballer (born 1983)

Personal information
- Full name: Jonas Flavien Okétola
- Date of birth: 27 August 1983 (age 43)
- Place of birth: Benin City, Nigeria
- Position: Midfielder

Senior career*
Years	Team	Apps	(Gls)
1998–2004	Dragons de l'Ouémé		
2004–2005	Enyimba		
2006–2008	Kwara United		
2008–2009	Thanda Royal Zulu		
2009–2010	USS Kraké		
2010–2012	Küçük Kaymaklı Türk		
2012–2013	Eco FC		

International career
1998–2008	Benin	34	(2)
- * Club domestic league appearances and goals

Jonas Okétola (born 27 August 1983) is a former professional footballer who played as a midfielder. Born in Nigeria, he played for the Benin national team at international level.

== Club career ==
Born in Nigeria, Okétola played professional football for local side Kwara United before signing with South African club Thanda Royal Zulu in 2008.

The South Africa Soccer Association assessed a two-year ban on Okétola in January 2009, as a result of a doping violation. A random test after a league match turned up a positive result for amphetamines, a prohibited substance.

== International career ==
Okétola was part of the Benin national team at the 2004 African Nations Cup, which finished bottom of its group in the first round of competition, thus failing to qualify for the quarter-finals.
