= Murphy Akanji =

Nigerian footballer (born 1977)

Personal information
- Date of birth: 1 December 1977 (age 48)
- Place of birth: Lagos, Nigeria
- Position: Goalkeeper

Senior career*
| Years | Team | Apps | (Gls) |
| 1995 | Niger Tornadoes | ? | (0) |
| 1996 | Sharks | ? | (0) |
| 1997 | Udoji United | 21 | (0) |
| 1998–2001 | Julius Berger | 27 | (0) |
| 2001–2008 | Sliema Wanderers | 171 | (0) |

International career
| 1999–2002 | Nigeria | 2 | (0) |
Medal record
Representing Nigeria
Africa Cup of Nations
| Runner-up | 2000 |
| Third place | 2002 |
- * Club domestic league appearances and goals

Murphy Akanji(born 1 December 1977) is a Nigerian former professional footballer who played as a goalkeeper. He most notably played for Sliema Wanderers in the Maltese Football League between 2001 and 2008, and represented the Nigeria national team at the Africa Cup of Nations in 2000 and 2002.

== Club career ==
Akanji joined Sliema Wanderers from Julius Berger in August 2001, and aspired to make an impression and rapidly travel to a better club in a more significant European league. He was one of the best goalkeepers in the Maltese Premier League throughout his time with the club, although he often mixed flashes of brilliance with beginners' mistakes, making consistency his main flaw. In both 2005–06 and 2006–07 seasons, Akanji won the Goalkeeper of the Year award.

== International career ==
Akanji was an international goalkeeper and has represented Nigeria at the African Nations Cup.

== Honours ==
Julius Berger

- Nigeria Professional Football League: 2000
- Nigerian Super Cup: 2000

Sliema Wanderers

- Maltese Premier League: 2002–03, 2003–04, 2004–05
- Maltese FA Trophy: 2003–04

Nigeria

- Africa Cup of Nations runner-up: 2000, third place: 2002

Individual

- Maltese Premier League Goalkeeper of the Year: 2005–06, 2006–07
