= 2002 FIFA World Cup qualification (CAF) =

Tournament details
- Dates: 7 April 2000 - 29 July 2001
- Teams: 50 (from 1 confederation)

Tournament statistics
- Matches played: 145
- Goals scored: 379 (2.61 per match)
- Attendance: 3,593,675 (24,784 per match)
- Top scorer(s): (Ivory Coast) Ibrahima Bakayoko (11 goals)

Listed below are the dates and results for the 2002 FIFA World Cup qualification rounds for Africa.

The Confederation of African Football was allocated five qualifying berths for the 2002 FIFA World Cup. 51 teams entered the qualification process.

Burundi withdrew before the draw was made, while Niger chose not to participate.

Guinea was excluded from the competition during the second round for government interference with its national association, resulting in their results obtained in second round being annulled.

Africa's five automatic qualifying berths were taken by Cameroon, Senegal, Tunisia, South Africa, and Nigeria.

== Format ==
There were two rounds of play:

- First round: The 50 teams were divided into five pools of ten teams each. In each pool, the ten teams were paired up to play knockout matches on a home-and-away basis. The winners advanced to the second round.
- Second round: The 25 teams were divided into five groups of five teams each. The teams played against each other on a home-and-away basis. The group winners qualified.

== First round ==
=== Pool A ===
Team 1	Agg.	Team 2	1st leg	2nd leg
Mauritania	1–5	Tunisia	1–2	0–3
Guinea-Bissau	0–3	Togo	0–0	0–3
Cape Verde	0–2	Algeria	0–0	0–2
Benin	1–2	Senegal	1–1	0–1
Gambia	0–3	Morocco	0–1	0–2

=== Pool B ===
Team 1	Agg.	Team 2	1st leg	2nd leg
Madagascar	2–1	Gabon	2–0	0–1
Botswana	0–2	Zambia	0–1	0–1
Swaziland	1–8	Angola	0–1	1–7
Lesotho	0–3	South Africa	0–2	0–1
Sudan	2–2 (a)	Mozambique	1–0	1–2

=== Pool C ===
Team 1	Agg.	Team 2	1st leg	2nd leg
São Tomé and Príncipe	2–4	Sierra Leone	2–0	0–4
Central African Republic	1–4	Zimbabwe	0–1	1–3
Rwanda	2–4	Ivory Coast	2–2	0–2
Equatorial Guinea	2–5	Congo	1–3	1–2
Libya	4–3	Mali	3–0	1–3

=== Pool D ===
Team 1	Agg.	Team 2	1st leg	2nd leg
Djibouti	2–10	DR Congo	1–1	1–9
Seychelles	1–4	Namibia	1–1	0–3
Eritrea	0–4	Nigeria	0–0	0–4
Somalia	0–6	Cameroon	0–3	0–3
Mauritius	2–6	Egypt	0–2	2–4

=== Pool E ===
Team 1	Agg.	Team 2	1st leg	2nd leg
Malawi	2–0	Kenya	2–0	0–0
Tanzania	2–4	Ghana	0–1	2–3
Uganda	4–7	Guinea	4–4	0–3
Ethiopia	2–4	Burkina Faso	2–1	0–3
Chad	0–1	Liberia	0–1	0–0

== Second round ==
=== Group A ===
Pos	Team	Pld	W	D	L	GF	GA	GD	Pts	Qualification	(Cameroon)	(Angola)	(Zambia)	(Togo)	(Libya)
1	Cameroon	8	6	1	1	14	4	+10	19	2002 FIFA World Cup	—	3–0	1–0	2–0	1–0
2	Angola	8	3	4	1	11	9	+2	13		2–0	—	2–1	1–1	3–1
3	Zambia	8	3	2	3	14	11	+3	11		2–2	1–1	—	2–0	2–0
4	Togo	8	2	3	3	10	13	−3	9		0–2	1–1	3–2	—	2–0
5	Libya	8	0	2	6	7	19	−12	2		0–3	1–1	2–4	3–3	—

=== Group B ===
Pos	Team	Pld	W	D	L	GF	GA	GD	Pts	Qualification	(Nigeria)	(Liberia)	(Sudan)	(Ghana)	(Sierra Leone)
1	Nigeria	8	5	1	2	15	3	+12	16	2002 FIFA World Cup	—	2–0	3–0	3–0	2–0
2	Liberia	8	5	0	3	10	8	+2	15		2–1	—	2–0	1–2	1–0
3	Sudan	8	4	0	4	8	10	−2	12		0–4	2–0	—	1–0	3–0
4	Ghana	8	3	2	3	10	9	+1	11		0–0	1–3	1–0	—	5–0
5	Sierra Leone	8	1	1	6	2	15	−13	4		1–0	0–1	0–2	1–1	—

=== Group C ===
Pos	Team	Pld	W	D	L	GF	GA	GD	Pts	Qualification	(Senegal)	(Morocco)	(Egypt)	(Algeria)	(Namibia)
1	Senegal	8	4	3	1	14	2	+12	15	2002 FIFA World Cup	—	1–0	0–0	3–0	4–0
2	Morocco	8	4	3	1	8	3	+5	15		0–0	—	1–0	2–1	3–0
3	Egypt	8	3	4	1	16	7	+9	13		1–0	0–0	—	5–2	8–2
4	Algeria	8	2	2	4	11	14	−3	8		1–1	1–2	1–1	—	1–0
5	Namibia	8	0	2	6	3	26	−23	2		0–5	0–0	1–1	0–4	—

=== Group D ===
Pos	Team	Pld	W	D	L	GF	GA	GD	Pts	Qualification	(Tunisia)	(Ivory Coast)	(Democratic Republic of the Congo)	(Madagascar)	(Republic of the Congo)
1	Tunisia	8	6	2	0	23	4	+19	20	2002 FIFA World Cup	—	1–1	6–0	1–0	6–0
2	Ivory Coast	8	4	3	1	18	8	+10	15		2–2	—	1–2	6–0	2–0
3	DR Congo	8	3	1	4	7	16	−9	10		0–3	1–2	—	1–0	2–0
4	Madagascar	8	2	0	6	5	15	−10	6		0–2	1–3	3–0	—	1–0
5	Congo	8	1	2	5	5	15	−10	5		1–2	1–1	1–1	2–0	—

=== Group E ===
Pos	Team	Pld	W	D	L	GF	GA	GD	Pts	Qualification	(South Africa)	(Zimbabwe)	(Burkina Faso)	(Malawi)	(Guinea)
1	South Africa	6	5	1	0	10	3	+7	16	2002 FIFA World Cup	—	2–1	1–0	2–0	~~Canc.~~
2	Zimbabwe	6	4	0	2	7	5	+2	12		0–2	—	1–0	2–0	~~Canc.~~
3	Burkina Faso	6	1	2	3	7	8	−1	5		1–1	1–2	—	4–2	~~2–3~~
4	Malawi	6	0	1	5	4	12	−8	1		1–2	0–1	1–1	—	~~Canc.~~
5	Guinea (Note: Guinea were excluded on 19 March 2001 due to government interference in football. The results of their three matches were annulled.)	0	0	0	0	0	0	0	0	Excluded	~~Canc.~~	~~3–0~~	~~Canc.~~	~~1–1~~	—

== Qualified teams ==
The following five teams from CAF qualified for the final tournament.

Team	Qualified as	Qualified on	Previous appearances in FIFA World Cup^{1}
Cameroon	Final round group 1 winners	1 July 2001	4 (1982, 1990, 1994, 1998)
Nigeria	Final round group 2 winners	29 July 2001	2 (1994, 1998)
Senegal	Final round group 3 winners	21 July 2001	0 (debut)
Tunisia	Final round group 4 winners	15 July 2001	2 (1978, 1998)
South Africa	Final round group 5 winners	1 July 2001	1 (1998)

^{1} Bold indicates champions for that year. Italic indicates hosts for that year.

== Top goalscorers ==
There were 379 goals scored in 145 matches, for an average of 2.61 goals per match.

11 goals

- (Ivory Coast) Ibrahima Bakayoko

8 goals

- (Senegal) El Hadji Diouf

6 goals

- (Angola) Akwá
- (Cameroon) Patrick Mboma
- (Tunisia) Zoubeir Baya

5 goals

- (Democratic Republic of the Congo) Ngidi Yemweni
- (Tunisia) Ziad Jaziri
- (Tunisia) Ali Zitouni
- (Zimbabwe) Peter Ndlovu

4 goals

- (Guinea) Pascal Feindouno
- (Guinea) Souleymane Youla
- (Morocco) Abdeljalil Hadda
- (Namibia) Razundara Tjikuzu
- (Nigeria) Victor Agali
- (Nigeria) Nwankwo Kanu
- (South Africa) Shaun Bartlett
- (Tunisia) Imed Mhedhebi

Below are full goalscorer lists for each round:

- First round
- Second round
