= Papa Fall =

Senegalese footballer and coach

Personal information
- Full name: Papa Massé Mbaye Fall
- Date of birth: 11 December 1985 (age 40)
- Place of birth: Dakar, Senegal
- Height: 1.92 m (6 ft 3 1/2 in)
- Position: Goalkeeper

Senior career*
Years	Team	Apps	(Gls)
2008–2009	Ciudad de Vícar B		
2009–2010	Norias CF		
2014	Union Meppen	8	(1)
2014–2015	A.D. Polideportivo Aguadulce		

International career
2016	Guinea-Bissau	1	(0)
- * Club domestic league appearances and goals

Papa Massé Mbaye Fall is a Senegalese-born Bissau-Guinean football player and coach. His playing position is a goalkeeper and he is the goalkeeper coach of A.D. Polideportivo Aguadulce.

== International career ==
He made his international debut for Guinea-Bissau against Zambia on 4 June 2016. His eligibility for Guinea-Bissau has been questioned by the Football Association of Zambia, that sent a complaint to the Confederation of African Football. His eligibility was upheld on 22 August 2016, confirming Guinea-Bissau's cup of Nations qualification.

== Personal life ==
He is the younger brother of FIFA referee Ousmane Fall.
