= Bilal Sidibé =

Mauritanian footballer

Personal information
- Full name: Mamadou Sidibe Diop
- Date of birth: December 31, 1978 (age 47)
- Place of birth: Nouakchott, Mauritania
- Height: 1.88 m (6 ft 2 in)
- Position: Defender

Senior career*
| Years | Team | Apps | (Gls) |
| 1996–1998 | ASC Ksar | - | (-) |
| 2000–2001 | ASC Mauritel | - | (-) |
| 2001 | ASC Jeanne d'Arc | - | (-) |
| 2001–2004 | AS Vitré | - | (-) |
| 2004–2007 | Vendée Poiré sur Vie | | |
| 2007–2009 | GSI Pontivy | 29 | (5) |
| 2009–2012 | Vendée Poiré sur Vie | | |
| 2012–2013 | AS Gabès | 0 | (0) |
| 2013–2018 | FCAV Redon | | |

International career
| 1994–2014 | Mauritania | 52 | (1) |
- * Club domestic league appearances and goals

Bilal Sidibé (born December 31, 1978) is a Mauritanian retired footballer who played primarily as a defender.

== Career ==
The defender was a member of the Mauritania national team. He scored an own goal for Egypt during the 2008 African Cup of Nations (qualification).
