= Thierry Etouayo =

Congolese footballer

Personal information
- Full name: Fabrice Thierry Etouayo
- Date of birth: 29 July 1977 (age 49)
- Position: Goalkeeper

Senior career*
Years	Team	Apps	(Gls)
–1998	Kotoko MFOA		
1999–2000	ASEC Mimosas		
2000–2001	FC Rouen	4	(0)
- Évreux AC
- Jura Sud Foot

International career
1994–2001	Congo	5	(0)
- * Club domestic league appearances and goals

Thierry Etouayo (born 29 July 1977) is a Congolese footballer. He played in five matches for the Congo national football team from 1994 to 2001. He was also named in Congo's squad for the 2000 African Cup of Nations tournament.
