= Chernor Mansaray =

Sierra Leonean footballer

Personal information
- Full name: Chernor Mansaray
- Date of birth: February 5, 1976 (age 50)
- Place of birth: Kabala, Sierra Leone
- Position: Striker

Senior career*
Years	Team	Apps	(Gls)
1994–2001	El Qanah	7	
2001–2002	Al Ahly		
2002–2006	Union Alexandria		
2006–2007	Al-Ta'ee		
2007	Aluminium Nag Hammâdi		
2008	Al Yarmouk		
2008–2011	Al-Sekka Al-Hadid		

International career
1996–2003	Sierra Leone	20	(2)
- * Club domestic league appearances and goals

Chernor Mansaray (born February 5, 1976) is a Sierra Leonean former international footballer. Mansaray was a member of the Sierra Leone squad at the 1996 African Nations Cup in South Africa.
