= Rock Embingou =

Congolese footballer

Personal information
- Full name: Rock-Simplice Embingou
- Date of birth: 25 September 1968 (age 58)
- Place of birth: Brazzaville, Congo
- Height: 1.85 m (6 ft 1 in)
- Position: Attacking midfielder

Senior career*
Years	Team	Apps	(Gls)
1992–1996	Étoile du Congo		
1996–1997	Lok Altmark Stendal	23	(5)
1997–2001	VfL Halle 1896	55+	(19+)
2001–2003	VfB Leipzig	59	(11)
2003–2004	FSV Zwickau	18	(2)
2004–2005	Saxonia Tangermünde		
2005–2008	1. FC Gera 03	27+	(4+)
2010–2011	Normania Treffurt		
2011–2012	FSV Kitzscher		
Total		182+	(41+)

International career^{‡}
1994–2004	Congo	20	(1)
- * Club domestic league appearances and goals as of 23:56, 25 February 2021 (UTC) ‡ National team caps and goals as of 23:56, 25 February 2021 (UTC)

Rock-Simplice Embingou (born 25 September 1968) is a Congolese former footballer who played as an attacking midfielder. He represented the Congo national football team at the 2000 African Cup of Nations.
