= Bréhima Traoré =

Malian footballer

Personal information
- Date of birth: 23 August 1973 (age 53)

International career
| Years | Team | Apps | (Gls) |
| 1994–2004 | Mali | 27 | (8) |

Bréhima Traoré (born 23 August 1973) is a Malian footballer. He played in 27 matches for the Mali national football team from 1994 to 2004. He was also named in Mali's squad for the 1994 African Cup of Nations tournament.
