= Mannaseh Mwanza =

Zambian footballer (born 1978)

Personal information
- Date of birth: 12 December 1978 (age 47)
- Position: Defender

Senior career*
Years	Team	Apps	(Gls)
1998	Nkana F.C.		
1999–2003	Power Dynamos F.C.		
2004–2005	Highlanders F.C.		
2006–2007	Power Dynamos F.C.		

International career
1999–2001	Zambia	15	(0)
- * Club domestic league appearances and goals

Mannaseh Mwanza (born 12 December 1978) is a retired Zambian football defender. He was a squad member at the 2000 African Cup of Nations.
