= Mathieu Traoré =

Burkinabé footballer

Personal information
- Date of birth: 22 April 1972 (age 54)

International career
Years	Team	Apps	(Gls)
2000	Burkina Faso	1	(0)

Mathieu Traoré (born 22 April 1972) is a Burkinabé footballer. He played in one match for the Burkina Faso national football team in 2000. He was also named in Burkina Faso's squad for the 2000 African Cup of Nations tournament.
