= Omar Diallo =

Senegalese football goalkeeper

Personal information
- Full name: Omar Diallo
- Date of birth: September 28, 1972 (age 54)
- Place of birth: Dakar, Senegal
- Height: 1.81 m (5 ft 11 in)
- Position: Goalkeeper

Senior career*
Years	Team	Apps	(Gls)
1992–1994	ASC Diaraf		
1994–1999	Raja de Casablanca		
1999–2002	Olympique de Khouribga		
2002–2004	ASC Diaraf		
2004–2005	Sakaryaspor	9	(0)
2005–2006	ASC Diaraf		
2006	AS Jaon		

International career
1996 – 2004	Senegal	32	(0)
- * Club domestic league appearances and goals

Omar Diallo (born September 28, 1972 in Dakar) is a Senegalese former professional footballer who played as a goalkeeper. He played for a few clubs, including Olympique Khouribga in Morocco and Sakaryaspor in Turkey. He played for the Senegal national team and was a participant at the 2002 FIFA World Cup.

== Club career ==
Diallo began his playing career at ASC Jaraaf in Senegal. In 1994, he moved to Morocco, where he played for Raja Casablanca, and later also played for Olympique Khouribga.

In 2002, he returned to Senegal and resumed playing for ASC Jaraaf. In 2004, he moved to Turkey to join Sakaryaspor, making nine appearances in the Süper Lig during the 2004–05 season.

After returning to Senegal, Diallo played as a goalkeeper for AS Jaon in the Navétanes, an amateur football competition in the Dakar region, in 2006. At the time, he expressed his hope of continuing his playing career and returning to professional football.

== International career ==
Diallo made his debut for the Senegal national team on 12 January 1997 in a match against Mali. He subsequently appeared in international matches, including Africa Cup of Nations qualifiers, and served as one of the national team's main goalkeepers in 1999 and 2000.

In 2002, he was included in Senegal's squad for the 2002 FIFA World Cup. However, he did not make any appearances in the tournament, in which Senegal reached the quarter-finals.

His final international appearance came on 27 March 2002, in a friendly match against the Bolivia.
