= Arthur Lungu =

Zambian footballer (born 1976)

Personal information
- Date of birth: 13 April 1976 (age 50)
- Position: Midfielder

Senior career*
| Years | Team | Apps | (Gls) |
- Zamsure F.C.
| 1998 | Al-Taawoun | | |

International career
| 1995–2000 | Zambia | 5 | (1) |
- * Club domestic league appearances and goals

Arthur Lungu (born 13 April 1976) is a retired Zambian football midfielder. He was a squad member at the 2000 African Cup of Nations.
