= Naceur Bedoui =

Tunisian footballer

Personal information
- Date of birth: 15 November 1964 (age 61)
- Place of birth: Sfax, Tunisia
- Position: Goalkeeper

International career
Years	Team	Apps	(Gls)
1992–1999	Tunisia	3	(0)

Naceur Bedoui (born 15 November 1964) is a Tunisian footballer. He played in three matches for the Tunisia national football team from 1992 to 1999. He was also named in Tunisia's squad for the 2000 African Cup of Nations tournament.
