= Luc-Arsène Diamesso =

Congolese footballer

Personal information
- Date of birth: 27 December 1974 (age 51)
- Place of birth: Djambala, Congo
- Height: 1.89 m (6 ft 2 in)
- Position: Centre-back

Senior career*
Years	Team	Apps	(Gls)
1992–1993	CARA Brazzaville		
1994	AS Police		
1995–1996	Asante Kotoko		
1996–2003	BV Cloppenburg	130+	(3+)
2003–2012	SV Wilhelmshaven	233	(1)
2015–2018	BV Essen	2	(0)
Total		365+	(4+)

International career
1994–2004	Congo	36	(0)
- * Club domestic league appearances and goals

Luc-Arsène Diamesso (born 27 December 1974) is a Congolese former footballer who played as a centre-back. He represented the Congo national team at the 2000 African Cup of Nations.
