= Abdelfattah El Khattari =

Moroccan footballer

Personal information
- Date of birth: 3 March 1977 (age 49)
- Position: Forward

International career
Years	Team	Apps	(Gls)
- Morocco

Abdelfattah El Khattari (born 3 March 1977) is a Moroccan former footballer. He competed in the men's tournament at the 2000 Summer Olympics.
