= Jules Tchimbakala =

Congolese footballer (born 1971)

Personal information
- Full name: Constant Jules Tchimbakala
- Date of birth: 15 January 1971 (age 55)
- Place of birth: Pointe-Noire, People's Republic of the Congo
- Height: 1.80 m (5 ft 11 in)
- Position: Left-back

Senior career*
Years	Team	Apps	(Gls)
1990–1995	Paris FC		
1995–1998	Toulouse	68	(1)
1998–1999	Le Mans	10	(0)
1999–2000	Thouars		
2003–2004	Paris FC		
2004–2005	Raith Rovers	0	(0)
2005	Inter Brazzaville		

International career
2000–2001	Republic of the Congo	7	(0)
- * Club domestic league appearances and goals

Jules Tchimbakala (born 15 January 1971) is a Congolese former professional footballer who played as a left-back.

Tchimbakala spent most of his career playing in the lower levels of French football, primarily with Paris FC. He spent two seasons playing in Ligue 1 with Toulouse FC and two seasons playing in Ligue 2 for Toulouse and Le Mans UC 72. (Note: Jules Tchimbakala – French league stats at LFP – also available in French (archived)) He had a brief spell in Scotland with Raith Rovers without making a first-team appearance for the club.

Tchimbakala made several appearances for the Republic of the Congo national team, including three appearances at the 2000 African Cup of Nations finals.
