= Daouda Ly =

Senegalese footballer

Daouda Ly (born 21 October 1972) is a retired former association football goalkeeper. He represented Senegal at the 2000 African Cup of Nations and played club football for ASC Ndiambour, SONACOS and ASC Diaraf.
