= Jean-Sylvestre N'Keoua =

Congolese footballer (born 1979)

Personal information
- Date of birth: 31 December 1979 (age 46)
- Place of birth: People's Republic of the Congo
- Position: Midfielder

Senior career*
Years	Team	Apps	(Gls)
1998–2001	Africa Sports d'Abidjan		
2002	ASC Bouaké		
2002–2003	MO Constantine		

International career
1995–2003	Congo	32	(1)
- * Club domestic league appearances and goals

Jean-Sylvestre N'Keoua (born 31 December 1979) is a Congolese former professional footballer who played as a midfielder.

N'Keoua played for Africa Sports National in the CAF Champions League 2000.

N'Keoua has made several appearances for the Republic of the Congo national football team, including qualifying matches for the 1998 and 2002 FIFA World Cup. He also played at the 2000 African Nations Cup.
