= Mamadou Sylla (footballer, born 1975) =

Senegalese footballer

Mamadou Sylla (born 4 April 1975) is a retired Senegalese football defender.

Sylla was capped for Senegal and was a squad member for the 2000 African Cup of Nations. He played club football for AS Douanes at the time.
