= Issa Sanogo (footballer) =

Burkinabé footballer

Personal information
- Date of birth: 30 November 1971 (age 54)

International career
Years	Team	Apps	(Gls)
2000	Burkina Faso	3	(0)

Issa Sanogo (born 30 November 1971) is a Burkinabé footballer. He played in three matches for the Burkina Faso national football team in 2000. He was also named in Burkina Faso's squad for the 2000 African Cup of Nations tournament.
