= Bédel Moyimbouabéka =

Congolese footballer

Personal information
- Date of birth: 8 November 1977 (age 48)
- Place of birth: Brazzaville, Congo

International career
Years	Team	Apps	(Gls)
1995–2001	Congo	22	(2)

Bédel Moyimbouabéka (born 8 November 1977) is a Congolese footballer. He played in 22 matches for the Congo national football team from 1995 to 2001. He was also named in Congo's squad for the 2000 African Cup of Nations tournament.
