= Jean-Jacques Yemweni =

Congolese footballer

Personal information
- Full name: Jean-Jacques Ngidi Yemweni
- Date of birth: 4 April 1976 (age 50)
- Place of birth: Kinshasa, Zaire
- Height: 1.85 m (6 ft 1 in)
- Position: Forward

Senior career*
Years	Team	Apps	(Gls)
1995–1997	CS Style du Congo		
1997–2001	Daring Club Motema Pembe		
2001	Al-Hilal Club		
2001–2003	FC Sion	1	(0)
2003–2005	TP Mazembe		
2005–2006	G.D. Sagrada Esperança		
2006–2010	Daring Club Motema Pembe		
2010–2011	TC Elima		

International career
2000–2007	DR Congo	13	(8)
- * Club domestic league appearances and goals

Jean-Jacques Yemweni (born 4 April 1976) is a Congolese former professional footballer who played as a forward. He had a brief spell with FC Sion in the Swiss Super League.

== Career statistics ==
=== International ===
Scores and results list DR Congo's goal tally first, score column indicates score after each Yemweni goal.

List of international goals scored by Jean-Jacques Yemweni
No.	Date	Venue	Opponent	Score	Result	Competition	Ref.
1	7 April 2000	El Hadj Hassan Gouled Aptidon Stadium, Djibouti City, Djibouti	Djibouti	1–1	1–1	2002 FIFA World Cup qualification	
2	23 April 2000	Stade des Martyrs, Kinshasa, Democratic Republic of Congo	Djibouti	2–0	9–1	2002 FIFA World Cup qualification	
3	23 April 2000	Stade des Martyrs, Kinshasa, Democratic Republic of Congo	Djibouti	6–1	9–1	2002 FIFA World Cup qualification	
4	23 April 2000	Stade des Martyrs, Kinshasa, Democratic Republic of Congo	Djibouti	9–1	9–1	2002 FIFA World Cup qualification	
5	2 July 2000	Barthélemy Boganda Stadium, Bangui, Central African Republic	Central African Republic	1–0	1–1	2002 African Cup of Nations qualification	
6	9 July 2000	Stade des Martyrs, Kinshasa, Democratic Republic of Congo	Congo	2–0	2–0	2002 FIFA World Cup qualification	
7	16 July 2000	Stade des Martyrs, Kinshasa, Democratic Republic of Congo	Central African Republic	1–0	2–0	2002 African Cup of Nations qualification	
8	22 August 2007	Stade des Martyrs, Kinshasa, Democratic Republic of Congo	Angola	2–1	3–1	Friendly	
