= Pape Niokhor Fall =

Senegalese international footballer

Pape Fall
Personal information
- Full name: Pape Niokhor Fall
- Date of birth: September 15, 1977 (age 49)
- Place of birth: Senegal
- Position: Midfielder

Senior career*
Years	Team	Apps	(Gls)
1999–2004	Jeanne d′Arc		
2005–2006	Dinamo Tirana		
2006	Africa Sports		
2006	Renacimiento FC		

International career^{‡}
1998–2000	Senegal	18	(0)
- * Club domestic league appearances and goals as of 9 December 2009 ‡ National team caps and goals as of 9 December 2009

Pape Niokhor Fall (born September 9, 1977) is a Senegalese former international footballer.

== Career ==
He played for his home country ASC Jeanne d'Arc, Albanian KS Dinamo Tirana, Ivorian Africa Sports National and Ecuatorial Guinean Renacimiento FC.

He has played 18 matches for the Senegal national team. He also participated in the 2000 African Cup of Nations.

== Honours ==
Jeanne d'Arc

- Senegal Premier League: 1999, 2001, 2002 and 2003

Renacimiento

- Equatoguinean Premier League: 2006

== External sources ==
- Pape Niokhor Fall at National-Football-Teams.com
