= Mohamed Emara =

Egyptian footballer (born 1974)

Personal information
- Date of birth: 10 July 1974 (age 52)
- Place of birth: Dakahlia, Egypt
- Height: 1.67 m (5 ft 6 in)
- Position: Midfielder

Senior career*
Years	Team	Apps	(Gls)
1993–1996	Baladeyet El-Mahalla		
1996–1998	Al Ahly		
1998–2002	Hansa Rostock	76	(0)
2002–2004	Al Ahly		
2004–2005	Al-Masry		

International career
1995–2002	Egypt	68	(2)
- * Club domestic league appearances and goals

Mohamed Emara (Arabic: مُحَمَّد عَمَّارَة; born 10 July 1974) is a retired Egyptian football midfielder. He played four seasons in the Bundesliga for Hansa Rostock.

== Honours ==
- Africa Cup of Nations: 1998
- Egyptian Premier League: 1998
- Egypt Cup: 2003
