= 4 August Stadium =

Stadium in Ouagadougou, Burkina Faso

Coordinates: 12°22′08.5″N 1°33′12.6″W

- Interactive map of 4 August Stadium
- Full name: Stade du 4-août
- Location: Rue 9.04; Ouagadougou, Burkina Faso
- Owner: Burkina Faso Government
- Capacity: 29,800
- Surface: Grass
- Field size: 105m x 68m

Construction
- Built: 1981
- Opened: 1984
- Renovated: 1996

Tenants
- EF Ouagadougou & Salimata et Taséré FC

The 4 August Stadium is a multi-purpose stadium in Ouagadougou, Burkina Faso. It is currently used mostly for football matches and it has an athletics track. The stadium has a capacity of 29,800 people. Étoile Filante de Ouagadougou play their home games at the stadium.

== History ==
Construction of the Stade du 4-Août began in 1981 as part of a national sports infrastructure project. It was built with cooperation from China, and was inaugurated on 18 July 1984 by President Thomas Sankara. The name commemorated the 1983 Upper Voltan coup d'état held on 4 August 1983. On 2 March 2021, the stadium was suspended by the Confederation of African Football (CAF) for failing to meet required standards. These included poor condition of the playing surface, drainage issues, lack of numbered seats, inadequate security access and emergency services areas, and poor accommodation for press and broadcasters. Subsequently, players of the Burkina Faso national football team had to play matches internationally.

=== Renovation and opening ===
During a Council of Ministers Meeting held on 4 December 2024, the government approved an additional 4 milliards FCFA to completing the renovation of the Stade du 4-Août. President Ibrahim Traoré ordered that "the responsibility for managing the renovation works be clarified and tightened." On 23 April 2025, the Ministers of Sports inspected the renovation progress. On 1 July 2025, the stadium received the official CAF homologation letter for international matches following extensive technical and safety inspections. On 4 August 2025 the official reopening ceremony of the stadium was held. Following the certification from the CAF, the Burkina Faso national football team is able to play competitive home matches there again.

| Preceded by FNB Stadium; Johannesburg | African Cup of Nations; Final Venue; 1998 | Succeeded by National Stadium; Lagos |
