= 2000 Africa Cup of Nations Group B =

Group A of the 2000 African Cup of Nations ran from 23 January until 2 February. It consisted of Gabon, South Africa, Algeria and DR Congo. The matches were held in Accra and Kumasi in Ghana. South Africa and Algeria progressed to the quarterfinals.

== Standings ==
Pos	Team	Pld	W	D	L	GF	GA	GD	Pts	Qualification
1	South Africa	3	2	1	0	5	2	+3	7	Advance to knockout stage
2	Algeria	3	1	2	0	4	2	+2	5	Advance to knockout stage
3	DR Congo	3	0	2	1	0	1	−1	2	
4	Gabon	3	0	1	2	2	6	−4	1	

Source: CAF

== Gabon vs. South Africa ==
23 January 2000

Gabon	1–3	South Africa
N'Zigou 20'		Ngobe 42'; Bartlett 54', 77'

Kumasi Sports Stadium, Kumasi
Attendance: 20,000

GK	Jacques Deckousshoud
DF	Guy-Roger Nzeng
DF	François Amegasse
DF	Eric Ondo
DF	Thierry Mouyouma
MF	Daniel Cousin
MF	Jonas Ogandaga
MF	Dieudonné Londo	(substituted off) 61'
MF	Théodore Nzue Nguema
FW	Shiva N'Zigou
FW	Bruno Zita Mbanangoyé
Substitutions:
MF	René Nsi-Akue	(substituted on) 61'
Manager:
(Brazil) Antonio Dumas

GK	Andre Arendse
DF	Lucas Radebe
DF	Mark Fish
DF	Pierre Issa
MF	Eric Tinkler
MF	Quinton Fortune	(substituted off) 74'
MF	John Moshoeu
MF	Helman Mkhalele
MF	Dumisa Ngobe
FW	Shaun Bartlett
FW	Siyabonga Nomvete	(substituted off) 79'
Substitutions:
MF	Steve Lekoelea	(substituted on) 74'
FW	Pollen Ndlanya	(substituted on) 79'
Manager:
(South Africa) Trott Moloto

== Algeria vs. DR Congo ==
24 January 2000

Algeria	0–0	DR Congo

Kumasi Sports Stadium, Kumasi
Attendance: 7,000
Referee: Monteiro Duarte (Ivory Coast)

GK	Abdesslam Benabdellah
DF	Maamar Mamouni
DF	Abdelazziz Benhamlat
DF	Rezki Amrouche
MF	Mahieddine Meftah
MF	Nasreddine Kraouche
MF	Billel Dziri
MF	Moussa Saïb
FW	Farid Ghazi
FW	Fawzi Moussouni	(substituted off) 63'
FW	Rafik Saïfi	(substituted off) 70'
Substitutions:
MF	Brahim Mezouar	(substituted on) 63'
MF	Abdelhafid Tasfaout	(substituted on) 70'
Manager:
(Algeria) Nasser Sandjak

GK	Marcel Nkueni
DF	Kabwe Kasongo
DF	Kitutele Yuvuladio
DF	Esele Bakasu
DF	Michel Dinzey
MF	Ndjeka Mukando
MF	Emeka Mamale	(substituted off) 88'
MF	Makaya Nsilulu	(substituted off) 63'
FW	Banza Kasongo
FW	Missilou Mangituka
FW	Félix-Michel Ngonge
Substitutions:
MF	Ndompetelo Mbabu	(substituted on) 63'
MF	Apataki Kifu	(substituted on) 88'
Manager:
(Democratic Republic of the Congo) Basilua Lusadusu

== DR Congo vs. South Africa ==
27 January 2000

DR Congo	0–1	South Africa
		Bartlett 44'

Kumasi Sports Stadium, Kumasi
Attendance: 3,500
Referee: Olaniyan Olufumi (Niger)

GK	Marcel Nkueni
DF	Kabwe Kasongo
DF	Kitutele Yuvuladio
DF	Esele Bakasu
DF	Michel Dinzey
MF	Ndjeka Mukando
MF	Mubama Kibwey	(substituted off) 53'
MF	Makaya Nsilulu	(substituted off) 63'
FW	Banza Kasongo
FW	Missilou Mangituka	(substituted off) 67'
FW	Félix-Michel Ngonge
Substitutions:
FW	Ngidi Yemweni	(substituted on) 53'
MF	Ndompetelo Mbabu	(substituted on) 63'
DF	Dikilu Bageta	(substituted on) 67'
Manager:
(Democratic Republic of the Congo) Basilua Lusadusu

GK	Andre Arendse
DF	Lucas Radebe
DF	Mark Fish
DF	Pierre Issa
MF	Eric Tinkler
MF	Quinton Fortune
MF	John Moshoeu	(substituted off) 10'
MF	Helman Mkhalele
MF	Dumisa Ngobe
FW	Shaun Bartlett	(substituted off) 86'
FW	Siyabonga Nomvete
Substitutions:
MF	Alex Bapela	(substituted on) 10'
FW	Pollen Ndlanya	(substituted on) 86'
Manager:
(South Africa) Trott Moloto

== Gabon vs. Algeria ==
29 January 2000

Gabon	1–3	Algeria
Mbanangoyé 89'		Ghazi 12'; Tasfaout 41'; Dziri 89'

Kumasi Sports Stadium, Kumasi
Attendance: 5,000
Referee: Mourad Daami (Tunisia)

GK	Germain Mendome
DF	Guy-Roger Nzeng
DF	François Amegasse
DF	Eric Ondo	Sent off (straight red)
DF	Thierry Mouyouma
DF	Jean-Martin Mouloungui		(substituted off) 46'
MF	Daniel Cousin		(substituted off) 60'
MF	Jonas Ogandaga
MF	Théodore Nzue Nguema
FW	Shiva N'Zigou		(substituted off) 32'
FW
Substitutions:
MF	René Nsi-Akue		(substituted on) 32'
FW	Bruno Zita Mbanangoyé		(substituted on) 46'
FW	Henry Antchouet		(substituted on) 60'
Manager:
(Brazil) Antonio Dumas

GK	Abdesslam Benabdellah
DF	Maamar Mamouni
DF	Abdelazziz Benhamlat
DF	Rezki Amrouche
MF	Mahieddine Meftah
MF	Nasreddine Kraouche	(substituted off) 66'
MF	Billel Dziri
MF	Moussa Saïb
FW	Farid Ghazi	(substituted off) 77'
FW	Fawzi Moussouni	(substituted off) 66'
FW	Abdelhafid Tasfaout
Substitutions:
MF	Brahim Mezouar	(substituted on) 66'
MF	Moulay Haddou	(substituted on) 66'
MF	Rafik Saïfi	(substituted on) 77'
Manager:
(Algeria) Nasser Sandjak

== Gabon vs. DR Congo ==
2 February 2000

Gabon	0–0	DR Congo

Accra Sports Stadium, Accra
Attendance: 2,000
Referee: Abderahim El Arjoune (Morocco)

GK	Germain Mendome
DF	Chantry Muie Nguema
DF	Cedric Moubamba
DF	Tristan Mombo
DF	Thierry Mouyouma
MF	Dieudonné Londo	(substituted off) 77'
MF	René Nsi-Akue
MF	Jonas Ogandaga	(substituted off) 67'
MF	Théodore Nzue Nguema
FW	Shiva N'Zigou
FW	Bruno Zita Mbanangoyé
Substitutions:
FW	Armand Ossey	(substituted on) 67'
FW	Daniel Cousin	(substituted on) 77'
Manager:
(Brazil) Antonio Dumas

GK	Marcel Nkueni
DF	Kabwe Kasongo	Sent off (straight red)
DF	Kitutele Yuvuladio		(substituted off) 82'
DF	Esele Bakasu
DF	Michel Dinzey
MF	Ndjeka Mukando
MF	Epotele Bazamba
MF	Apataki Kifu
FW	Banza Kasongo		(substituted off) 59'
FW	Missilou Mangituka
FW	Ngidi Yemweni		(substituted off) 72'
Substitutions:
FW	Serge Mputu Mbungu		(substituted on) 59'
MF	Makaya Nsilulu		(substituted on) 72'
DF	Dikilu Bageta		(substituted on) 89'
Manager:
(Democratic Republic of the Congo) Basilua Lusadusu

== Algeria vs. South Africa ==
2 February 2000

Algeria	1–1	South Africa
Moussouni 52'		Bartlett 2'

Kumasi Sports Stadium, Kumasi
Attendance: 2,000
Referee: Tessema Hailemalik (Ethiopia)

GK	Abdesslam Benabdellah
DF	Maamar Mamouni
DF	Abdelazziz Benhamlat
DF	Rezki Amrouche
MF	Mahieddine Meftah
MF	Nasreddine Kraouche
MF	Billel Dziri
MF	Moussa Saïb
FW	Farid Ghazi
FW	Fawzi Moussouni	(substituted off) 57'
FW	Abdelhafid Tasfaout
Substitutions:
MF	Moulay Haddou	(substituted on) 57'
Manager:
(Algeria) Nasser Sandjak

GK	Hans Vonk
DF	Lucas Radebe
DF	Mark Fish
DF	Pierre Issa
MF	Eric Tinkler	(substituted off) 60'
MF	Quinton Fortune	(substituted off) 46'
MF	Thabo Mngomeni	(substituted off) 46'
MF	Helman Mkhalele
MF	Dumisa Ngobe
FW	Shaun Bartlett
FW	Glen Salmon
Substitutions:
MF	Alex Bapela	(substituted on) 46'
MF	Steve Lekoelea	(substituted on) 46'
DF	Papi Khomane	(substituted on) 60'
Manager:
(South Africa) Trott Moloto
