= Algeria national football team results (2000–2009) =

This page is a list of all the matches that Algeria national football team has played between 2000 and 2009.

== 2000 ==
20 January 2000 Friendlies	Burkina Faso	1–0	Algeria	Cotonou, Benin
17:00		Report

24 January 2000 (Ghana) (Nigeria) 2000 A.C.N GS	DR Congo	0–0	Algeria	Kumasi Sports Stadium, Kumasi
19:45				Attendance: 7,000; Referee: Manuel Duarte (Cape Verde)

29 January 2000 (Ghana) (Nigeria) 2000 A.C.N GS	Algeria	3–1	Gabon	Kumasi Sports Stadium, Kumasi
19:45	Ghazi 12'; Tasfaout 41'; Dziri 89'		Mbanangoyé 89'	Attendance: 5,000; Referee: Isaak Abdulkadir (Tanzania)

2 February 2000 (Ghana) (Nigeria) 2000 A.C.N GS	South Africa	1–1	Algeria	Kumasi Sports Stadium, Kumasi
16:00	Bartlett 2'		Moussouni 53'	Attendance: 2,000; Referee: Tessema Hailemalak (Ethiopia)

6 February 2000 (Ghana) (Nigeria) 2000 A.C.N 1/4	Cameroon	2–1	Algeria	Accra Sports Stadium, Accra
16:00	Eto'o 7'; Foé 24'		Tasfaout 79'	Attendance: 15,000; Referee: Falla Ndoye (Senegal)

9 April 2000 (South Korea) (Japan) 2002 W.C Q	Cape Verde	0–0	Algeria	Estádio da Várzea, Praia
15:00 (UTC-1)		Report		Attendance: 5,000; Referee: Abdou Diouf (Senegal)

21 April 2000 (South Korea) (Japan) 2002 W.C Q	Algeria	2–0	Cape Verde	Stade 19 Mai 1956, Annaba
16:00 (UTC+1)	Bourahli 7'; Saïfi 12'	Report		Attendance: 50,000; Referee: Malick Sillah (Gambia)

26 May 2000 Friendlies	Algeria	2–0	Burkina Faso	Stade 5 Juillet 1962, Alger

3 June 2000 Friendlies	Algeria	4–0	Guinea	Stade 19 Mai 1956, Annaba
	Saïfi 51', 60'; Boukessassa 69'; Madoui 90' (pen.)	Report		Referee: Boukhtir

16 June 2000 (South Korea) (Japan) 2002 W.C Q	Algeria	1–1	Senegal	Stade 19 Mai 1956, Annaba
17:00 UTC+01	Saïfi 27'	Report	Diop 16'	Attendance: 70,000; Referee: Sidi Bekaye Magassa (Mali)

28 June 2000 Friendlies	Tunisia	2–2	Algeria	Stade Chedli Zouiten, Tunis
	Mhadhebi 58', 70' (pen.)	Report	23' Abaci; 44' Meçabih

9 July 2000 (South Korea) (Japan) 2002 W.C Q	Morocco	2–1	Algeria	Fez Stadium, Fes
20:00 UTC+1	Hadda 51', 75'	Report	Meçabih 35'	Attendance: 10,000; Referee: Ferid Sahli (Tunisia)

3 September 2000 (Mali) 2002 A.C.N Q	Algeria	1–1	Burkina Faso	Stade 5 Juillet 1962, Algiers
	Abdelhafid Tasfaout 62'		Mamadou Zongo 52'

8 October 2000 (Mali) 2002 A.C.N Q	Angola	2–2	Algeria	Estádio da Cidadela, Luanda
	Sousa 52'; António Mendonça 66'		Abdelhafid Tasfaout 10', 26'

14 November 2000 Friendlies	Algeria	1–2	Bulgaria	Stade 5 Juillet 1962, Algiers
	Madoui 50'	Report	38' Stilian Petrov; 68' Ivanov	Attendance: 10.000; Referee: Dani Belbordj

5 December 2000 Friendlies	Algeria	3–2	Romania	Stade 5 Juillet 1962, Algiers
	Billel Dziri 21'; Mahieddine Meftah 30'; Djabelkheir 37'	Report	1', 45' Niculae	Attendance: 20,000; Referee: Mohamed Benaïssa (Algeria)

8 December 2000 Friendlies	Algeria	2–3	Romania	Stade 19 Mai 1956, Annaba
	Djabelkheir 19'; Kharkhache 66'	Report	10' Bărcăuan; 18', 70' Niculae	Attendance: 15,000; Referee: Salim Oussaci (Algeria)

== 2001 ==
12 January 2001 (Mali) 2002 A.C.N Q	Algeria	2–1	Burundi	Stade 5 Juillet 1962, Algiers
	Mehdi Méniri 6'; Abdelhafid Tasfaout 45'		Juma Mossi 60'

26 January 2001 (South Korea) (Japan) 2002 W.C Q	Algeria	1–0	Namibia	Stade 5 Juillet 1962, Algiers
15:30 UTC+01	Belmadi 34'	Report		Attendance: 30,000; Referee: Hichem Guirat (Tunisia)

27 February 2001 Friendlies	Algeria	1–1	Slovakia	Stade 5 Juillet 1962, Algiers
	4' Issaad Bourahli	Report	Szilárd Németh 60'	Attendance: 2.500; Referee: Mohamed Zekrini (Algeria)

11 March 2001 (South Korea) (Japan) 2002 W.C Q	Egypt	5–2	Algeria	Cairo International Stadium, Cairo
19:00 UTC+2	Barakat 7'; Sabry 17'; El-Saqua 39'; El-Said 85', 88'	Report	Tasfaout 12'; Meçabih 37'	Attendance: 45,000; Referee: Lim Kee Chong (Mauritius)

25 March 2001 (Mali) 2002 A.C.N Q	Burundi	0–1	Algeria	Prince Louis Rwagasore, Bujumbura
			Issaad Bourahli 17'

21 April 2001 (South Korea) (Japan) 2002 W.C Q	Senegal	3–0	Algeria	Stade Leopold Senghor, Dakar
17:00 UTC+0	Diouf 2', 47', 75'	Report		Attendance: 45,000; Referee: Abdullhakim Shelmani (Libya)

4 May 2001 (South Korea) (Japan) 2002 W.C Q	Algeria	1–2	Morocco	Stade 5 Juillet 1962, Algiers
17:00 UTC+01	Tasfaout 10'	Report	Benmahmoud 17'; Amzine 46'	Attendance: 15,000; Referee: Hichem Guirat (Tunisia)

1 June 2001 (Mali) 2002 A.C.N Q	Algeria	3–2	Angola	Stade 19 Mai 1956, Annaba
	Rafik Saïfi 6', 41' (pen.); Kamel Kherkhache 80'		Djiberato 29'; António Mendonça 60'

17 June 2001 (Mali) 2002 A.C.N Q	Burkina Faso	1–0	Algeria	Stade du 4-Août, Ouagadougou
	Seydou Traoré 38'

30 June 2001 (South Korea) (Japan) 2002 W.C Q	Namibia	0–4	Algeria	Sam Nujoma Stadium, Windhoek
15:00 UTC+1		Report	Settara 31'; Ouahid 35', 37'; Aouni 72'	Attendance: 900; Referee: Robin Williams (South Africa)

21 July 2001 (South Korea) (Japan) 2002 W.C Q	Algeria	1–1	Egypt	Stade 19 Mai 1956, Annaba
16:00 UTC+01	Bezzaz 68'	Report	Mido 60' (pen.)	Attendance: 38,000; Referee: Coffi Codjia (Benin)

6 October 2001 Friendlies	France	4–1	Algeria	Stade de France, Saint-Denis
	20' Vincent Candela; 32' Emmanuel Petit; 41' Thierry Henry; 55' Robert Pires	Report	Djamel Belmadi 45'	Attendance: 78.421; Referee: Gomes Costa (Portugal)

15 October 2001 Friendlies	Algeria	2–0	Burkina Faso	Stade 19 Mai 1956, Annaba
	Ghazi 47'; Kraouche 57'	Report		Attendance: 20.000; Referee: Yagoubi (Algeria)

5 December 2001 Friendlies	Algeria	1–1	Ghana	Stade 5 Juillet 1962, Algiers
	Saïfi 54'	Report	23' Blay	Attendance: 60.000; Referee: Zoubier Nouira (Tunsisa)

30 December 2001 Friendlies	Senegal	1–0	Algeria	Stade Leopold Sedar Senghor, Dakar
	Camara 28'	Report		Attendance: 45.000; Referee: Malick Syllah (Mali)

== 2002 ==
14 January 2002 Friendlies	Algeria	4–0	Benin	Stade 5 Juillet 1962, Algiers
	Tasfaout 22', 30'; Akrour 87'; Dziri 90' (pen.)	Report		Attendance: 2.000; Referee: Mohamed Benouza (Algeria)

21 January 2002 (Mali) 2002 A.C.N GS	Algeria	0–1	Nigeria	Stade du 26 Mars, Bamako
16:00			Aghahowa 43'	Attendance: 10,000; Referee: Felix Tangawarima (Zimbabwe)

25 January 2002 (Mali) 2002 A.C.N GS	Liberia	2–2	Algeria	Stade du 26 Mars, Bamako
19:30	Daye 7'; K. Sebwe 72'		Akrour 45'; Kraouche 90+1'	Attendance: 4,000; Referee: Evehe Divine (Cameroon)

28 January 2002 (Mali) 2002 A.C.N GS	Mali	2–0	Algeria	Stade du 26 Mars, Bamako
18:00	Bagayoko 18'; Touré 24'			Attendance: 50,000; Referee: Lim Kee Chong (Mauritius)

14 May 2002 Friendlies	Belgium	0–0	Algeria	King Baudouin Stadium, Brussels
		Report		Attendance: 20.000; Referee: Rogalla (Switzerland)

20 August 2002 Friendlies	Algeria	1–1	DR Congo	Stade Mustapha Tchaker, Blida
	Haddou 61' (pen.)	Report		Referee: Mohamed Lamine Benaïssa (Algeria)

7 September 2002 (Tunisia) 2004 A.C.N Q	Namibia	0–1	Algeria	Independence Stadium, Windhoek
		Report	Benjamin 5' (o.g.)	Attendance: 13,000

24 September 2002 Friendlies	Algeria	1–1	Uganda	Stade 19 Mai 1956, Annaba
	Amaouche 46'	Report	32' Nubiri	Referee: Mohamed Lamine Benaïssa (Algeria)

11 October 2002 (Tunisia) 2004 A.C.N Q	Algeria	4–1	Chad	Stade 19 Mai 1956, Annaba
	Akrour 26', 72' (pen.); Djamel Belmadi 54', 69'	Report		Attendance: 20,000

== 2003 ==
25 January 2003 Friendlies	Uganda	0–1	Algeria	Mandela National Stadium, Kampala
		Report	64' Ammour	Attendance: 5.000; Referee: Yusuf Awuye (Uganda)

12 February 2003 Friendlies	Algeria	1–3	Belgium	Stade 19 Mai 1956, Annaba
	Belmadi 89'	Report	2', 57' Émile Mpenza; 7' Wesley Sonck	Attendance: 40.000; Referee: Djamel Baraket (Tunisia)

29 March 2003 Friendlies	Angola	1–1	Algeria	Estádio da Cidadela, Luanda
	Gilberto 5' (pen.)	Report	85' Akrour	Attendance: 8.000; Referee: Leopoldo Mavunza (Angola)

24 April 2003 Friendlies	Algeria	3–1	Madagascar	Stade de la Licorne, Amiens
	Fellahi 6'; Belkaïd 53'; Cherrad 66'	Report	78' (pen.) Menakely	Attendance: 1.000; Referee: Pascal Garibian (France)

29 May 2003 Friendlies	Algeria	0–1	Burkina Faso	Stade François Blin, Avion
		Report	90' Dagano	Attendance: 1050; Referee: Gannard (France)

20 June 2003 (Tunisia) 2004 A.C.N Q	Algeria	1–0	Namibia	Stade Mustapha Tchaker, Blida
	Kraouche 5'	Report		Attendance: 30,000

6 July 2003 (Tunisia) 2004 A.C.N Q	Chad	0–0	Algeria	Stade Nacional, N'Djamena
		Report

4 September 2003 Friendlies	Algeria	1–0	Qatar	Stade Paul Audrain, Dinard
	Cherrad 26'	Report		Attendance: 400; Referee: (FRA)

24 September 2003 Friendlies	Algeria	2–2 (4–3 p)	Gabon	Stade 5 Juillet 1962, Algiers
	Fellahi 51'; Achiou 59'	Report	21' Zué Nguéma; 83' Moubamba	Attendance: 2.000; Referee: Mohamed Zekrini (Algeria)

26 September 2003 Friendlies	Algeria	0–0 (4–3 p)	Burkina Faso	Stade 5 Juillet 1962, Algiers
		Report		Attendance: 1.500; Referee: Mohamed Benouza (Algeria)

11 October 2003 (Germany) 2006 W.C Q	Niger	0–1	Algeria	Stade Général Seyni Kountché, Niamey
16:00 UTC+1		Report	Boutabout 63'	Attendance: 20,126; Referee: Lim Kee Chong (Mauritius)

14 November 2003 (Germany) 2006 W.C Q	Algeria	6–0	Niger	Stade 5 Juillet 1962, Algiers
21:30 UTC+1	Cherrad 16', 22'; Akrour 42', 45', 82'; Boutabout 77'	Report		Attendance: 53,200; Referee: Ba Seydou (Mauritania)

== 2004 ==
15 January 2004 Friendlies	Algeria	0–2	Mali	Stade 5 Juillet 1962, Algiers
		Report	4' D.Traoré; 58' B.Touré	Attendance: 7.000; Referee: Adel Zehmoun (Tunisia)

25 January 2004 (Tunisia) 2004 A.C.N GS	Cameroon	1–1	Algeria	Stade Olympique de Sousse, Sousse
19:00	M'Boma 43'		52' Zafour	Attendance: 20,000; Referee: Coffi Codjia (Benin)

29 January 2004 (Tunisia) 2004 A.C.N GS	Algeria	2–1	Egypt	Stade Olympique de Sousse, Sousse
19:00	Mamouni 13'; Achiou 86'		25' Belal	Attendance: 15,000; Referee: Alain Hamer (Luxembourg)

3 February 2004 (Tunisia) 2004 A.C.N GS	Algeria	1–2	Zimbabwe	Stade Olympique de Sousse, Sousse
14:00	Achiou 73'		65' A. Ndlovu; 71' Lupahla	Attendance: 10,000; Referee: Eddy Maillet (Seychelles)

8 February 2004 (Tunisia) 2004 A.C.N 1/4	Morocco	3 – 1 (a.e.t.)	Algeria	Stade Taïeb El Mhiri, Sfax
17:00	Chamakh 90'; Hadji 113'; Zairi 120'		84' Cherrad	Attendance: 22,000; Referee: Abdel Hakim Shelmani (Libya)

28 April 2004 Friendlies	Algeria	0–1	China	Stade Gabriel Montpied, Clermont-Ferrand
		Report	26' Bo	Attendance: 3.000; Referee: Poulat (France)

30 May 2004 Friendlies	Algeria	1–1	Jordan	Stade 19 Mai 1956, Annaba
	Cherrad 60'	Report	18' Shelbaïeh	Attendance: 35.000; Referee: Adel Zehmoun (Tunisia)

5 June 2004 (Germany) 2006 W.C Q	Algeria	0–0	Angola	Stade 19 Mai 1956, Annaba
19:00		(Report)		Attendance: 55,000; Referee: Mourad Daami (Tunisia)

20 June 2004 (Germany) 2006 W.C Q	Zimbabwe	1–1	Algeria	National Sports Stadium, Harare
15:00	Raho 60' (o.g.)	(Report)	3' Cherrad	Attendance: 65,000; Referee: Wa Ntambidila (Congo DR)

3 July 2004 (Germany) 2006 W.C Q	Nigeria	1–0	Algeria	Abuja Stadium, Abuja
16:00	Yobo 84'	(Report)		Attendance: 35,000; Referee: Ladoual Hisseine (Chad)

17 August 2004 Friendlies	Algeria	2–2	Burkina Faso	Stade 5 Juillet 1962, Algiers
	Tahraoui 33'; Arrache 54'	Report	50' (pen.) Zongo; 67' Ouédraogo	Attendance: 15.000; Referee: Tahri Saïd (Morocco)

5 September 2004 (Germany) 2006 W.C Q	Algeria	0–3	Gabon	Stade 19 Mai 1956, Annaba
20:15		(Report)	56' Aubameyang; 73' Akieremy; 84' Bito'o	Attendance: 51,000; Referee: Falla N'Doye (Senegal)

9 October 2004 (Germany) 2006 W.C Q	Rwanda	1–1	Algeria	Stade Amahoro, Kigali
16:00	Saïd 9'	(Report)	14' Bourahli	Attendance: 20,000; Referee: Khalid Abdel Rahman (Sudan)

17 November 2004 Friendlies	Senegal	1–2	Algeria	Stade Mayol, Toulon
	Niang 35'; Guèye 41'	Report	77' Daoud	Attendance: 4.000; Referee: Claude Bata (France)

== 2005 ==
9 February 2005 Friendlies	Algeria	3–0	Burkina Faso	Stade 5 Juillet 1962, Algiers
	31', 39' Saïfi; 83' Daoud	Report		Attendance: 3.000; Referee: Benacer (Algeria)

27 March 2005 (Germany) 2006 W.C Q	Algeria	1–0	Rwanda	Stade Ahmed Zabana, Oran
19:00	Boutabout 48'	(Report)		Attendance: 20,000; Referee: Essam Abd El Fatah (Egypt)

5 June 2005 (Germany) 2006 W.C Q	Angola	2–1	Algeria	Estádio da Cidadela, Luanda
15:30	Flávio 50'; Akwá 58'	(Report)	Boutabout 63'	Attendance: 27,000; Referee: Jean-Marie Hicuburundi (Burundi)

12 June 2005 Friendlies	Algeria	0–3	Mali	Stade Fernand Fourrier, Arles
		Report	Coulybali 33'; Dissa 58', 79'	Attendance: 2.000; Referee: Derrien (France)

19 June 2005 (Germany) 2006 W.C Q	Algeria	2–2	Zimbabwe	Stade Ahmed Zabana, Oran
20:30	Yahia 17'; Daoud 48'	(Report)	Kaondera 33'; P. Ndlovu 87'	Attendance: 15,000; Referee: Lassina Paré (Burkina Faso)

4 September 2005 (Germany) 2006 W.C Q	Algeria	2–5	Nigeria	Stade Ahmed Zabana, Oran
20:30	Yacef 48'; Boutabout 58'	(Report)	Martins 20' (pen.), 88', 90'; Utaka 42'; Obodo 81'	Attendance: 11,000; Referee: Abdullhakim Shelmani (Libya)

8 October 2005 (Germany) 2006 W.C Q	Gabon	0–0	Algeria	Stade Pierre Claver Divounguy, Port-Gentil
15:30		(Report)		Attendance: 37,000; Referee: Ousmane Diouf (Senegal)

== 2006 ==
28 February 2006 Friendlies	Burkina Faso	0–0	Algeria	Stade Robert Diochon, Rouen
		Report		Attendance: 2.000; Referee: Laurent Duhamel (France)

4 June 2006 Friendlies	Algeria	1–0	Sudan	Stade 5 Juillet 1962, Algiers
	49' Daham	Report		Referee: Riyad Harzi (Tunisia)

15 August 2006 Friendlies	Algeria	0–2	Gabon	Stade Carcasonne, Aix-en-Provence
		Report	Mouloungui 65'; Djissékadie 67'	Referee: Mezouar (France)

3 September 2006 (Ghana) 2008 A.C.N Q	Guinea	0–0	Algeria	Stade 28 Septembre, Conakry
		(Report)		Attendance: 30.000; Referee: Koman Coulibaly (Mali)

7 October 2006 (Ghana) 2008 A.C.N Q	Algeria	1–0	Gambia	Stade 5 Juillet 1962, Algiers
	Karim Ziani 75' (pen.)	(Report)		Attendance: 48.000; Referee: Mohamed Auda (Egypt)

15 November 2006 Friendlies	Algeria	1–2	Burkina Faso	Luynes, France
	88' (pen.) Saïfi	Report	Yaméogo 60' (pen.); Koffi 82'	Attendance: 700; Referee: Didier Falcone (France)

== 2007 ==
7 February 2007 Friendlies	Algeria	2–1	Libya	Stade 5 Juillet 1962, Algiers
	Saïfi 63'; Méniri 68'	Report	48' Chibani Ahmed	Referee: Riyad Harzi (Tunisia)

24 March 2007 (Ghana) 2008 A.C.N Q	Algeria	2–0	Cape Verde	Stade 5 Juillet 1962, Algiers
	Noureddine Deham 60'; Mehdi Meniri 89'	(Report)		Attendance: 35.000; Referee: Essam Abd El Fatah (Egypt)

2 June 2007 (Ghana) 2008 A.C.N Q	Cape Verde	2–2	Algeria	Estádio da Várzea, Praia
	Marco Soares 65'; Hernâni Borges 90'	(Report)	33' Madjid Bougherra; 84' Rafik Saifi	Referee: Abou Bacar Charef (Ivory Coast)

7 June 2007 Friendlies	Argentina	4–3	Algeria	Camp Nou, Barcelona
20h30	2' Carlos Tevez; 54', 73' Lionel Messi; 56' Esteban Cambiasso	Report	Anthar Yahia 18'; Madjid Bougherra 43'; Nadir Belhadj 75'	Referee: Alvarez Izquiere (Spain)

16 June 2007 (Ghana) 2008 A.C.N Q	Algeria	0–2	Guinea	Stade 5 Juillet 1962, Algiers
		(Report)	Fodé Mansaré 43'; Pascal Feindouno 84'	Attendance: 80.000; Referee: El Guezzaz (Morocco)

22 August 2007 Friendlies	Brazil	2–0	Algeria	Stade de la Mosson, Montpellier
18h30		Report	61' Maicon Douglas; 80' Ronaldinho	Attendance: 26.392; Referee: Sandryk Biton (France)

9 September 2007 (Ghana) 2008 A.C.N Q	Gambia	2–1	Algeria	Independence Stadium, Bakau
	Assan Jatta 75' (pen.) 86'	(Report)	Rafik Saifi 58'	Attendance: 20.000; Referee: Emmanuel Emiare (Nigeria)

27 November 2007 Friendlies	Algeria	3–2	Mali	Stade Robert Diochon, Rouen
	40' Bouazza; 73' Ghilas; 88' Belhadj	Report	Dramane Traoré 42' (pen.), 49'	Referee: (France)

== 2008 ==
26 March 2008 Friendlies	Algeria	1–1	DR Congo	Stade Maurice Bacquet, Goussainville
	Ghilas 90' (pen.)	Report		Referee: Johann Rouinsard (France)

31 May 2008 (South Africa) 2010 W.C Q	Senegal	1–0	Algeria	Stade Leopold Senghor, Dakar
19:30 UTC+0	Diagne-Faye 79'	Report		Attendance: 55,000; Referee: Alex Kotey (Ghana)

6 June 2008 (South Africa) 2010 W.C Q	Algeria	3–0	Liberia	Stade Mustapha Tchaker, Blida
19:30 UTC+1	Djebbour 14'; Ziani 18', 46' (pen.)	Report		Attendance: 22,000; Referee: Mohamed Ould Lemghambodj (Mauritania)

14 June 2008 (South Africa) 2010 W.C Q	Gambia	1–0	Algeria	Independence Stadium, Bakau
17:00 UTC+0	Jaiteh 19' (pen.)	Report		Attendance: 18,000; Referee: Koman Coulibaly (Mali)

20 June 2008 (South Africa) 2010 W.C Q	Algeria	1–0	Gambia	Stade Mustapha Tchaker, Blida
19:30 UTC+1	Yahia 33'	Report		Attendance: 24,000; Referee: Gil Ndume (Gabon)

20 August 2008 Friendlies	Algeria	1–0	United Arab Emirates	Stade Ferdi Petit, Le Touquet
	Bezzaz 8'	Report		Attendance: 1.000; Referee: Gauthier (France)

5 September 2008 (South Africa) 2010 W.C Q	Algeria	3–2	Senegal	Stade Mustapha Tchaker, Blida
22:00 UTC+1	Cheikh Gueye 60' (o.g.); Saïfi 67'; Yahia 73'	Report	Diao 54'; Gueye 90'	Attendance: 25,000; Referee: Eddy Maillet (Seychelles)

11 October 2008 (South Africa) 2010 W.C Q	Liberia	0–0	Algeria	National Complex, Monrovia
16:00 UTC+0		Report		Attendance: 2,000; Referee: Ahmed Auda (Egypt)

18 November 2008 Friendlies	Algeria	1–1	Mali	Stade Robert Diochon, Rouen
	Abdeslam 90'	Report	12' Diabaté	Referee: Julien Dominique (France)

== 2009 ==
11 February 2009 Friendlies	Algeria	2–1	Benin	Stade Mustapha Tchaker, Blida
	Ghezzal 36'; Ghilas 45'	Report	85' Boco	Attendance: 20.000; Referee: Mohamed Trabelsi (Tunisia)

28 March 2009 (South Africa) 2010 W.C Q	Rwanda	0–0	Algeria	Stade Amahoro, Kigali
15:30 UTC+2		Report		Attendance: 22,000; Referee: Coffi Codjia (Benin)

7 June 2009 (South Africa) 2010 W.C Q	Algeria	3–1	Egypt	Stade Mustapha Tchaker, Blida
20:30 UTC+1	Matmour 60'; Ghezzal 64'; Djebbour 77'	Report	Aboutrika 86'	Attendance: 26,500; Referee: Daniel Bennett (South Africa)

20 June 2009 (South Africa) 2010 W.C Q	Zambia	0–2	Algeria	Konkola Stadium, Chililabombwe
14:00 UTC+2		Report	Bougherra 21'; Saïfi 66'	Attendance: 9,000; Referee: Divine Evehe (Cameroon)

12 August 2009 Friendlies	Algeria	1–0	Uruguay	Stade 5 Juillet 1962, Algiers
21h00	Djebbour 77'	Report		Attendance: 45.000; Referee: Riad Harzi (Tunisia)

6 September 2009 (South Africa) 2010 W.C Q	Algeria	1–0	Zambia	Stade Mustapha Tchaker, Blida
22:00 UTC+1	Saïfi 59'	Report		Attendance: 30,000; Referee: Rajindraparsad Seechurn (Mauritius)

11 October 2009 (South Africa) 2010 W.C Q	Algeria	3–1	Rwanda	Stade Mustapha Tchaker, Blida
19:15 UTC+1	Ghezzal 22'; Belhadj 45+2'; Ziani 90+5' (pen.)	Report	Mutesa 19'	Attendance: 22,000; Referee: Yakhouba Keita (Guinea)

14 November 2009 (South Africa) 2010 W.C Q	Egypt	2–0	Algeria	Cairo International Stadium, Cairo
19:30 UTC+2	Zaki 3'; Moteab 90+5'	Report		Attendance: 75,000; Referee: Jerome Damon (South Africa)

18 November 2009 (South Africa) Tiebreaking play-off	Algeria	1–0	Egypt	Al Merreikh Stadium, Omdurman (Sudan)
20:30 UTC+3	Yahia 40'	Report		Attendance: 35,000; Referee: Eddy Maillet (Seychelles)
