= 1997 Afro-Asian Cup of Nations =

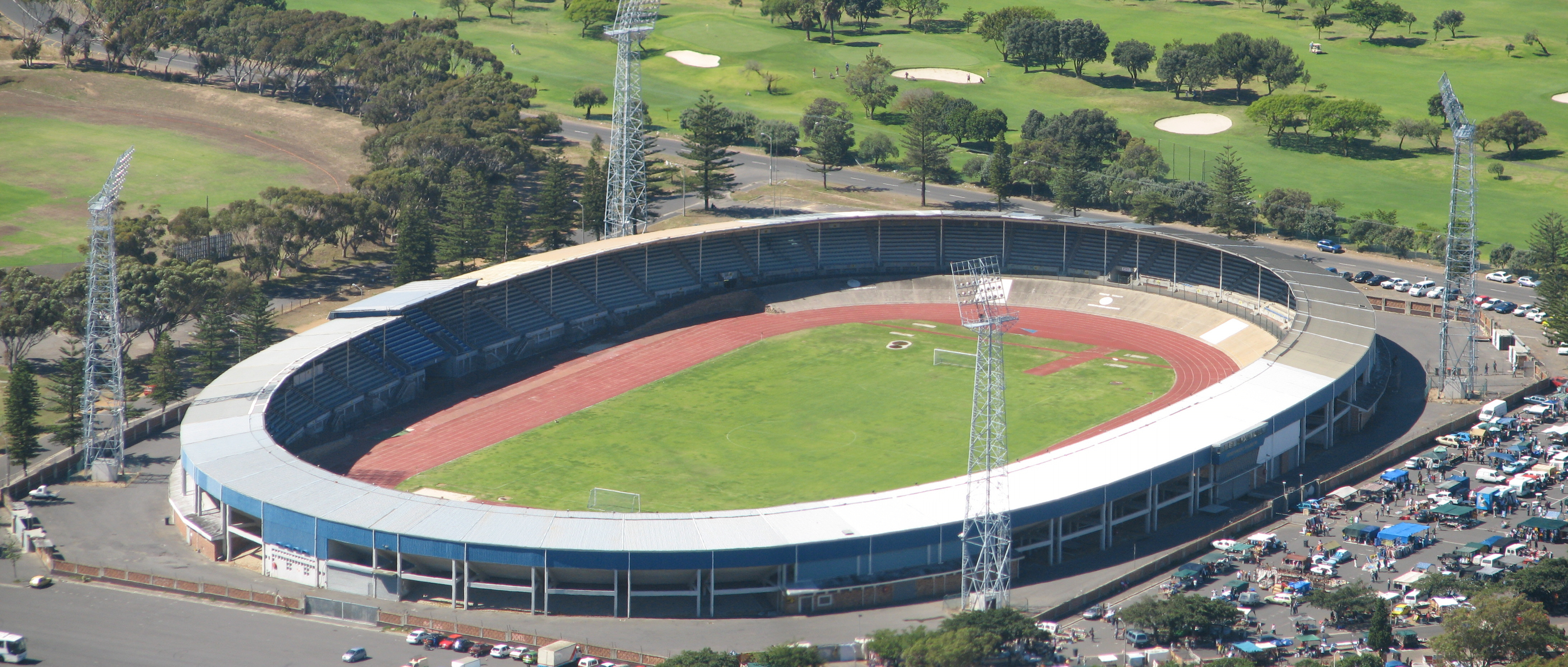
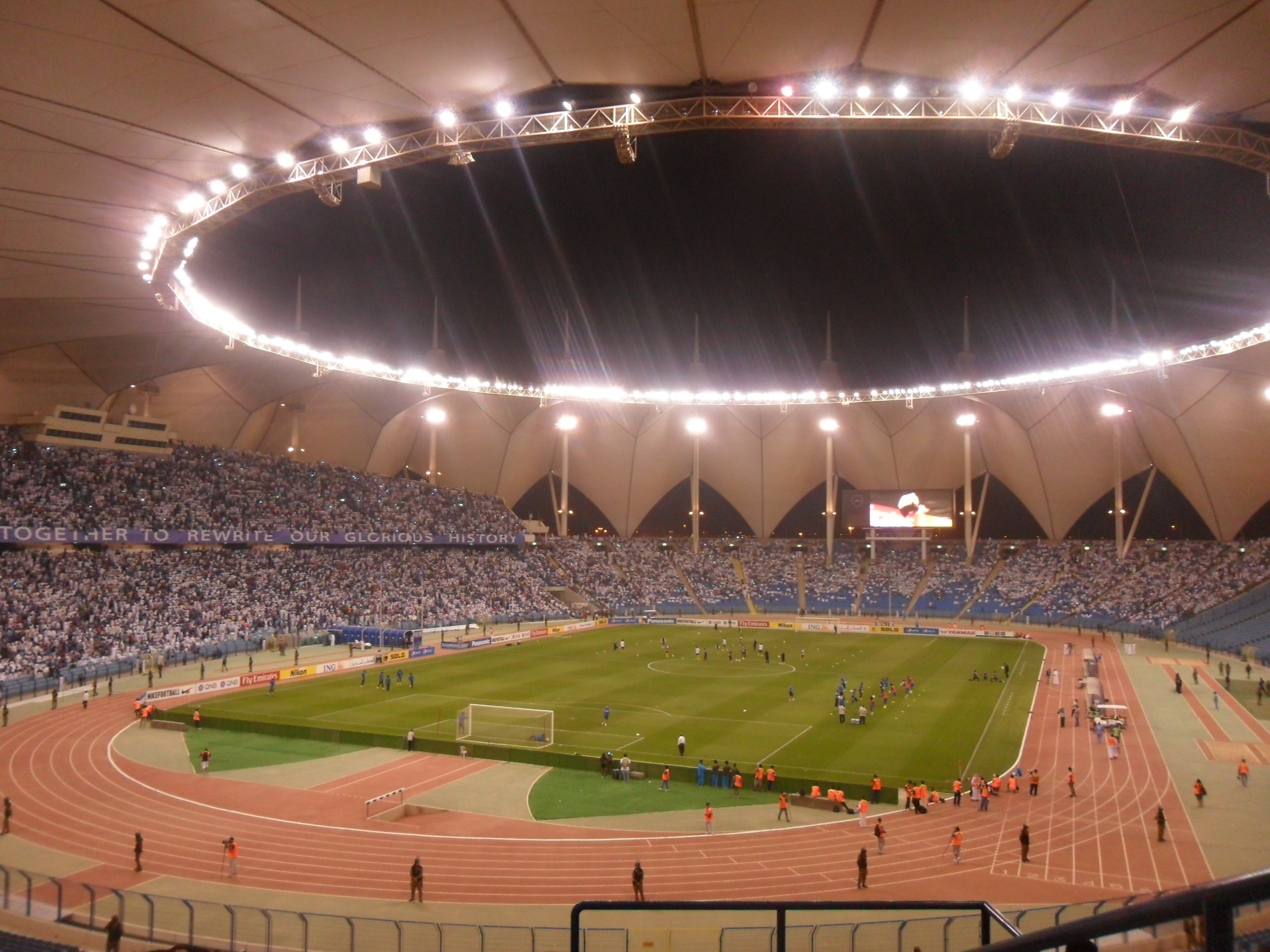
- Old Greenpoint & King Fahd Int. Stadiums
| South Africa | Saudi Arabia |
| 1 | 0 |

First leg
| South Africa | Saudi Arabia |
| 1 | 0 |
- Date: 18 September 1999
- Venue: Green Point Stadium, Cape Town
- Referee: Felix Tangawarima (Zimbabwe)
- Attendance: 20,000

Second leg
| Saudi Arabia | South Africa |
| 0 | 0 |
- Date: 30 September 1999
- Venue: King Fahd International Stadium, Riyadh
- Referee: Saad Kamil (Kuwait)
- Attendance: 50,000

The 1997 Afro-Asian Cup of Nations was the seventh edition of the Afro-Asian Cup of Nations, it was contested between Saudi Arabia, winners of the 1996 Asian Cup, and South Africa, winners of the 1996 African Cup of Nations. The matches were originally planned to be played in 1997, but scheduling issues led to a delay of two years, when the matches were finally played in 1999. South Africa won the title on aggregate score 1–0.

== Qualified teams ==
| Country | Qualified as | Previous appearance in tournament |
|---|---|---|
| South Africa | 1996 African Cup of Nations champions | Debut |
| Saudi Arabia | 1996 Asian Cup champions | 1 (1985) |

== Match details ==
=== First leg ===
18 September 1999
20:30 UTC+2

| South Africa | 1–0 | Saudi Arabia |
|---|---|---|
| Ndlanya 48' | report |

Green Point Stadium, Cape Town
Attendance: 20,000
Referee: Felix Tangawarima (Zimbabwe)

| South Africa | Saudi Arabia |

South Africa:
| GK | – | John Tlale |
| DF | – | Papi Khomane |
| DF | – | Mark Fish (c) |
| DF | – | Pierre Issa |
| DF | – | Ivan McKinley | (substituted off) 46' |
| MF | – | Eric Tinkler |
| MF | – | Thabo Mngomeni | (substituted off) 52' |
| MF | – | John Moshoeu |
| MF | – | Joel Masilela |
| FW | – | Pollen Ndlanya |
| FW | – | Benni McCarthy | (substituted off) 74' |
Substitutes:
| MF | – | Quinton Fortune | (substituted on) 46' |
| MF | – | Helman Mkhalele | (substituted on) 52' |
| FW | – | Shaun Bartlett | (substituted on) 74' |
Manager:
Trott Moloto

Saudi Arabia:
| GK | – | Mohamed Al-Deayea (c) |
| DF | – | Mohammed Al-Khilaiwi |
| DF | – | Abdullah Zubromawi |
| DF | – | Saleh Al-Dawod |
| DF | – | Hussein Abdulghani |
| DF | – | Mohammed Al-Jahani |
| MF | – | Fahad Saad Al-Subaie |
| MF | – | Ibrahim Al-Harbi |
| MF | – | Abdullah Al-Waked | (substituted off) 61' |
| FW | – | Hamzah Idris | (substituted off) 80' |
| FW | – | Marzouk Al-Otaibi | (substituted off) 56' |
Substitutes:
| MF | – | Nawaf Al-Temyat | (substituted on) 61' |
| FW | – | Obeid Al-Dosari | (substituted on) 56' |
| FW | – | Fahad Al-Mehallel | (substituted on) 80' |
Manager:
(Czech Republic) Milan Máčala

Assistant referees:
... ... (...)
... ... (...)
Fourth official:
... ... (...)

Man of the Match:
... ... (...)

=== Second leg ===
30 September 1999
17:00 UTC+3

| Saudi Arabia | 0–0 | South Africa |
|---|---|---|
| Al-Jaber (penalty missed) 35' | report |

King Fahd International Stadium, Riyadh
Attendance: 50,000
Referee: Saad Kamil (Kuwait)

| Saudi Arabia | South Africa |

Saudi Arabia:
| GK | – | Mohamed Al-Deayea (c) |
| DF | – | Mohammed Al-Khilaiwi |
| DF | – | Abdullah Zubromawi |
| DF | – | Saleh Al-Dawod |
| DF | – | Hussein Abdulghani |
| DF | – | Mohammed Al-Jahani |
| MF | – | Nawaf Al-Temyat |
| MF | – | Ibrahim Al-Harbi |
| MF | – | Khalid Al Temawi | (substituted off) 80' |
| FW | – | Sami Al-Jaber | (substituted off) 64' |
| FW | – | Obeid Al-Dosari | (substituted off) 71' |
Substitutes:
| MF | – | Fahad Saad Al-Subaie | (substituted on) 80' |
| FW | – | Fahad Al-Mehallel | (substituted on) 64' |
| FW | – | Marzouk Al-Otaibi | (substituted on) 71' |
Manager:
(Czech Republic) Milan Máčala

South Africa:
| GK | – | Andre Arendse |
| DF | – | Aaron Mokoena |
| DF | – | Mark Fish (c) |
| DF | – | Frank Schoeman |
| DF | – | Ivan McKinley |
| MF | – | Eric Tinkler |
| MF | – | Alex Bapela |
| MF | – | Joel Masilela | (substituted off) 61' |
| MF | – | Daniel Mudau |
| MF | – | Dumisa Ngobe | (substituted off) 65' |
| FW | – | Phil Masinga |
Substitutes:
| MF | – | Thabo Mngomeni | (substituted on) 61' |
| MF | – | Godfrey Sapula | (substituted on) 65' |
Manager:
Trott Moloto

Assistant referees:
... ... (...)
... ... (...)
Fourth official:
... ... (...)

Man of the Match:
... ... (...)

== Winners ==
South Africa won 1–0 on aggregate.

1997 Afro-Asian Cup of Nations

South Africa
1st title
