= Liberia at the Africa Cup of Nations =

Liberia participated in the African Cup of Nations twice, in 1996 and 2002. In the 1996 African Cup of Nations qualification, Liberia managed to register three wins (against Togo, Tunisia and Mauritania) and four draws, which saw them finish the group in second place and qualify for their first African Cup of Nations tournament. Following the withdrawal of Nigeria, Liberia was placed in a group with Gabon and Zaire. Liberia opened the tournament with a 2–1 victory over Gabon with goals from Kelvin Sebwe and Mass Sarr Jr. but lost 2–0 to Zaire. This meant that Liberia finished bottom of the group on goal difference and failed to progress to the knock-out stages.

In 2002 African Cup of Nations qualification, Liberia beat Cape Verde in the preliminary rounds, then they finished first of their group to qualify for the main tournament for the second time in their history. In the 2002 African Cup of Nations, Liberia drew their first game 1–1 with Mali (goal scored by George Weah) and drew their second game 2–2 against Algeria (goals from Prince Daye and Kelvin Sebwe), but in their final group game, needing a win against Nigeria, they lost 1–0.

== Overall record ==
Africa Cup of Nations record
Appearances: 2
Year	Round	Position	Pld	W	D	L	GF	GA
(Sudan) 1957 − (Ethiopia) 1962	Not affiliated to CAF							
(Ghana) 1963	Did not enter							
(Tunisia) 1965 − (Ethiopia) 1968	Did not qualify							
(Sudan) 1970 − (Egypt) 1974	Did not enter							
(Ethiopia) 1976	Did not qualify							
(Ghana) 1978 − (Nigeria) 1980	Did not enter							
(Libya) 1982	Did not qualify							
(Ivory Coast) 1984	Withdrew							
(Egypt) 1986 − (Algeria) 1990	Did not qualify							
(Senegal) 1992	Withdrew							
(Tunisia) 1994	Did not qualify							
(South Africa) 1996	Group stage	13th	2	1	0	1	2	3
(Burkina Faso) 1998 − (Ghana) (Nigeria) 2000	Did not qualify							
(Mali) 2002	Group stage	9th	3	0	2	1	3	4
(Tunisia) 2004 − (Morocco) 2025	Did not qualify							
(Kenya) (Tanzania) (Uganda) 2027	To be determined							
2029	To be determined							
Total	Group stage	2/35	5	1	2	2	5	7

== Tournaments ==
=== 1996 Africa Cup of Nations ===
==== Group stage ====
Pos	Team	Pld	W	D	L	GF	GA	GD	Pts	Qualification
1	Gabon	2	1	0	1	3	2	+1	3	Advance to knockout stage
2	Zaire	2	1	0	1	2	2	0	3	Advance to knockout stage
3	Liberia	2	1	0	1	2	3	−1	3	

Updated to match(es) played on unknown. Source:
16 January 1996

Gabon	1–2	Liberia
Nzeng 59'		Sebwe 5' (pen.); Sarr 54'

Kings Park Stadium, Durban
Attendance: 5,000
Referee: Gamal Al-Ghandour (Egypt)

25 January 1996

Zaire	2–0	Liberia
Lukaku 5' (pen.); Essende 72'

FNB Stadium, Johannesburg
Attendance: 3,000
Referee: Said Belqola (Morocco)

=== 2002 Africa Cup of Nations ===
==== Group stage ====
Pos	Team	Pld	W	D	L	GF	GA	GD	Pts	Qualification
1	Nigeria	3	2	1	0	2	0	+2	7	Advance to knockout stage
2	Mali (H)	3	1	2	0	3	1	+2	5	Advance to knockout stage
3	Liberia	3	0	2	1	3	4	−1	2	
4	Algeria	3	0	1	2	2	5	−3	1	

Updated to match(es) played on unknown. Source:
(H) Hosts
19 January 2002
16:00

Mali	1–1	Liberia
Keita 87'		Weah 45'

Stade du 26 Mars, Bamako
Attendance: 50,000
Referee: Abdel Hakim Shelmani (Libya)

25 January 2002
19:30

Liberia	2–2	Algeria
Daye 7'; K. Sebwe 72'		Akrour 45'; Kraouche 90+1'

Stade du 26 Mars, Bamako
Attendance: 4,000
Referee: Evehe Divine (Cameroon)

28 January 2002
18:00

Liberia	0–1	Nigeria
		Aghahowa 63'

Stade Barema Bocoum, Mopti
Attendance: 9,000
Referee: Falla Ndoye (Senegal)
