= 2000 African Cup of Nations final =

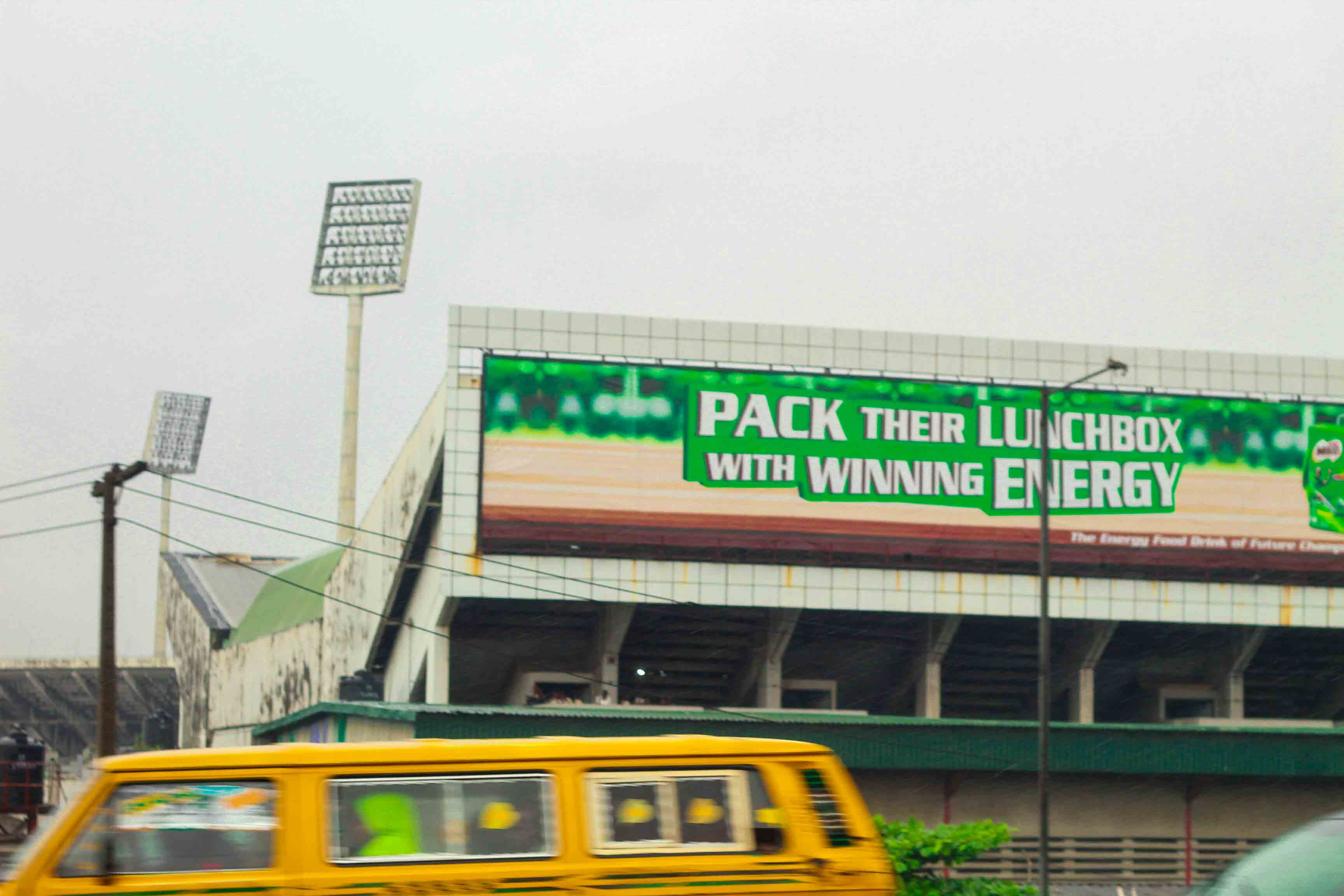
- Event: 2000 African Cup of Nations
Nigeria	Cameroon
(Nigeria)	(Cameroon)
2	2
- After extra time Cameroon won 4–3 on penalties
- Date: 13 February 2000
- Venue: Lagos National Stadium, Lagos
- Referee: Mourad Daami (Tunisia)
- Attendance: 60,000

The 2000 African Cup of Nations final was a football match that took place on 13 February 2000 at the Lagos National Stadium in Lagos, Nigeria, to determine the winner of the 2000 African Cup of Nations, the football championship of Africa organized by the Confederation of African Football (CAF).

Cameroon won the title for the third time by beating Nigeria 4–3 on penalties.

== Summary ==
The first goal was scored after a foul on Patrick M'Boma which led to a free kick that was capitalised by Samuel Eto'o in the 26th minute. In the 31st minute, M'Boma capitalized on a through pass from Eto'o to double the lead, nutmegging Ike Shorunmu in the process.

Cameroon continued to press for most of the first half and hit the post on one occasion. Striker Raphael Chukwu placed a low level shot at the back of the net to reduce the deficit to one before halftime. Then, Jay-Jay Okocha scored a long range shot to level the scoreline. Eto'o attempted to put Cameroon ahead again, but his shot hit the post. Substitute Tijani Babangida had a finely-placed shot on target which was saved by Boukar Alioum. Victor Ikpeba had a long range header go off target. The game was eventually decided on penalties with Cameroon emerging victorious.

== Details ==
13 February 2000
16:00

Nigeria	2–2 (a.e.t.)	Cameroon
Chukwu 45'; Okocha 47'	Report	Eto'o 26'; M'Boma 31'
Penalties
Okocha (penalty scored); Okpara (penalty scored); Kanu (penalty missed); Ikpeba (penalty missed); Oliseh (penalty scored)	3–4	(penalty scored) M'Boma; (penalty scored) Wome; (penalty scored) Geremi; (penalty missed) Foé; (penalty scored) Song

National Stadium, Lagos
Attendance: 60,000
Referee: Mourad Daami (Tunisia)

Nigeria	Cameroon

GK	1	Ike Shorunmu
RB	21	Godwin Okpara
CB	5	Furo Iyenemi	(yellow card) 26'
CB	15	Sunday Oliseh (c)	(yellow card) 55'
LB	6	Taribo West
CM	7	Finidi George		(substituted off) 70'
CM	8	Mutiu Adepoju		(substituted off) 98'
CM	3	Celestine Babayaro
AM	10	Jay-Jay Okocha
CF	18	Raphael Chukwu		(substituted off) 46'
CF	4	Nwankwo Kanu
Substitutions:
FW	17	Julius Aghahowa		(substituted on) 46'
FW	13	Tijani Babangida		(substituted on) 70'
FW	20	Victor Ikpeba		(substituted on) 98'
Manager:
(Netherlands) Jo Bonfrère

GK	1	Alioum Boukar
RB	6	Pierre Njanka	(yellow card) 90+2'
CB	4	Rigobert Song (c)	(yellow card) 57'
CB	5	Raymond Kalla		(substituted off) 94'
LB	3	Pierre Womé	(yellow card) 23'
DM	17	Marc-Vivien Foé
RM	12	Lauren
LM	20	Salomon Olembé
AM	8	Geremi
CF	10	Patrick M'Boma
CF	9	Samuel Eto'o		(substituted off) 72'
Substitutions:
FW	21	Joseph-Désiré Job		(substituted on) 72'
DF	13	Lucien Mettomo		(substituted on) 94'
Manager:
(France) Pierre Lechantre
