= Algeria national football team results =

This article shows the match statistics of the Algeria national football team.

- ALN football team results (1957–1958)
- FLN football team results (1958–1962)
- Algeria national football team results (1962–1969)
- Algeria national football team results (1970–1979)
- Algeria national football team results (1980–1989)
- Algeria national football team results (1990–1999)
- Algeria national football team results (2000–2009)
- Algeria national football team results (2010–2019)
- Algeria national football team results (2020–present)

Other matches

- Algeria national football team results (unofficial matches)
