= Laughter Chilembe =

Zambian footballer (born 1975)

Personal information
- Full name: Laughter Chilembe
- Date of birth: 25 November 1975 (age 50)
- Place of birth: Zambia
- Position: Right-back

Senior career*
Years	Team	Apps	(Gls)
1998–2003	Nchanga Rangers		
2004–2005	CAPS United		
2006–2007	Nchanga Rangers		
2008–2011	Power Dynamos		
2012–2016	NAPSA Stars		

International career
1999–2005	Zambia	43	(2)
- * Club domestic league appearances and goals as of 16:07, 22 July 2018 (UTC)

Laughter Chilembe (born 25 November 1975) is a former Zambian international footballer.

== Club career ==
Chilembe began his senior career in 1998 with Nchanga Rangers before signing for Zimbabwe Premier Soccer League club CAPS United. Chilembe re-signed for Nchanga Rangers in 2006 on his return to Zambia. Chilembe later signed for Power Dynamos, staying at the club for three seasons. In 2012, Chilembe signed for NAPSA Stars, seeing out his career at the club in 2016.

== International career ==
Chilembe represented Zambia at the 2000 Africa Cup of Nations. Despite two draws in the group stage, including one against Senegal where Chilembe scored, Zambia failed to advance.

=== International goals ===
Scores and results list Zambia's goal tally first.

#	Date	Venue	Opponent	Score	Result	Competition
1	1 February 2000	Lagos National Stadium, Surulere, Nigeria	Senegal	1–1	2–2	2000 Africa Cup of Nations
2	22 March 2003	Amahoro Stadium, Kigali, Rwanda	Rwanda	1–0	1–1	Friendly

== Honors ==
Nchanga Rangers

- Zambian Premier League: 1998

CAPS United

- Zimbabwe Premier Soccer League: 2004, 2005
- Cup of Zimbabwe: 2004

Power Dynamos

- Zambian Premier League: 2011
- Zambian Cup: 2009, 2011

NAPSA Stars

- Zambian Cup: 2012
