= Armand Ossey =

Gabonese footballer (born 1978)

Personal information
- Date of birth: 19 October 1978 (age 48)
- Place of birth: Libreville, Gabon
- Position: Forward

Senior career*
| Years | Team | Apps | (Gls) |
| 1995–1996 | CS Stade d'Akebe Libreville | | |
| 1996–1997 | Grenoble | | |
| 1997–1998 | Valence | 8 | (1) |
| 1998–1999 | Créteil | 28 | (6) |
| 1999–2000 | Moreirense | 16 | (4) |
| 2000–2001 | Pau | 12 | (3) |
| 2001–2002 | Rouen | 5 | (1) |
| 2002–2002 | Kuressaare | | |
| 2003–2008 | Paris | 77 | (15) |

International career
| 1998–2000 | Gabon | | |
- * Club domestic league appearances and goals

Armand Ossey (born 19 October 1978) is a Gabonese former professional footballer who played as a forward between 1995 and 2008. He played in Gabon as well as in France, Portugal and in Estonia at clubs including CS Stade d'Akebe Libreville, Grenoble, Valence, Créteil, Moreirense, Pau, Rouen, Kuressaare and Paris. He represented the Gabon between 1998 and 2000 internationally, participating in the 2000 African Nations Cup in 2000 in which Gabon finished in last place with one point.
