= Mohamed Ouamar Ghrib =

Algerian footballer (born 1960)

Mohamed Ghrib
Personal information
- Full name: Mohamed Ouamar Ghrib
- Date of birth: 24 January 1960 (age 66)
- Place of birth: Algiers, Algeria
- Height: 1.70 m (5 ft 7 in)
- Position: Midfielder

Senior career*
Years	Team	Apps	(Gls)
?	DNC Alger	?	(?)

International career
1980	Algeria Olympic	1	(0)
1980–1981	Algeria	9	(2)
- * Club domestic league appearances and goals

Mohamed Ghrib (born 24 January 1960) is a retired Algerian international footballer who played as a midfielder. He represented Algeria in the 1980 Summer Olympics.
