= Esele Bakasu =

Democratic Republic of the Congo footballer

Personal information
- Full name: Esele Bakasu
- Date of birth: 13 March 1975 (age 51)
- Place of birth: Zaire
- Height: 1.70 m (5 ft 7 in)
- Position: Defender

Senior career*
Years	Team	Apps	(Gls)
1997–1999	AS Vita Club		
1999–2001	Cambridge United		
2001–2002	SC Paderborn 07	2	(0)

International career^{‡}
1997–2002	DR Congo	13	(1)
Medal record
Representing DR Congo
Men's football
Africa Cup of Nations
Third place	1998 Burkina Faso
- * Club domestic league appearances and goals as of 17 May 2016 ‡ National team caps and goals as of 17 May 2016

Esele Bakasu (born 13 March 1975) is a retired footballer from DR Congo.

Bakasu was a member of the DR Congo squad for the 1998, 2000 and 2002 Africa Cup of Nations.

== Honours ==
DR Congo

- African Cup of Nations: 3rd place, 1998
