= Marcel Nkueni =

Democratic Republic of the Congo footballer

Personal information
- Full name: Makweni Marcel Mayala Nkueni
- Date of birth: 4 April 1978 (age 48)
- Place of birth: Kinshasa, Zaire
- Position: Goalkeeper

Senior career*
Years	Team	Apps	(Gls)
1997–2003	Daring Club Motema Pembe		
2003–2004	Orlando Pirates		
2004–2005	QNK Quảng Nam		
2005–2006	SHB Đà Nẵng	3	(0)
2006–2009	Winners Park		
2009–2011	Witbank Spurs		
2011–2012	Bay United		
2012–2014	Polokwane City	14	(0)

International career
1997–2001	DR Congo	12	(0)
Medal record
Representing DR Congo
Men's football
Africa Cup of Nations
Third place	1998 Burkina Faso
- * Club domestic league appearances and goals

Marcel Nkueni (born 4 April 1978) is a retired footballer from DR Congo. He was a member of the DR Congo squad for the 1998 and 2000 Africa Cup of Nations.

== Honours ==
DR Congo

- African Cup of Nations: 3rd place, 1998
