= Henri Michel =

French footballer (1947–2018)

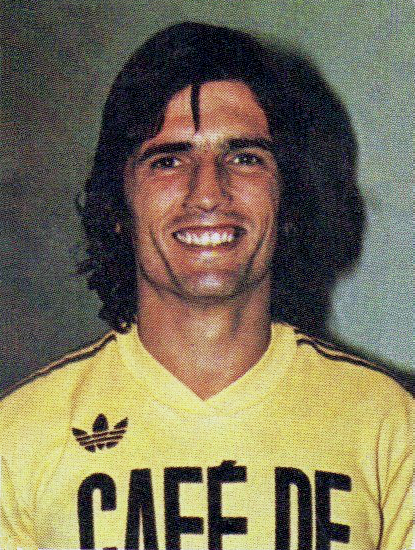
- Michel in 1976

Personal information
- Full name: Henri Louis Michel
- Date of birth: 28 October 1947
- Place of birth: Aix-en-Provence, France
- Date of death: 24 April 2018 (aged 70)
- Place of death: Gardanne, France
- Height: 1.75 m (5 ft 9 in)
- Position: Midfielder

Senior career*
Years	Team	Apps	(Gls)
1964–1966	Aix-en-Provence	36	(3)
1966–1982	Nantes	531	(81)
Total		567	(84)

International career
1967–1980	France	58	(4)

Managerial career
- 1982–1984: France U21
- 1984: France Olympic
- 1984–1988: France
- 1988–1990: France (DTN)
- 1990–1991: Paris Saint-Germain
- 1994: Cameroon
- 1995: Al Nassr
- 1995–2000: Morocco
- 2000–2001: UAE
- 2001: Aris Thessaloniki
- 2001–2002: Tunisia
- 2003–2004: Raja Casablanca
- 2004–2006: Ivory Coast
- 2006: Al-Arabi
- 2006–2007: Zamalek
- 2007: Morocco
- 2008–2009: Mamelodi Sundowns
- 2009: Zamalek
- 2010: Raja Casablanca
- 2011: Equatorial Guinea
- 2012: Kenya
Medal record
Men's football
Representing France (as manager)
Olympic Games
Gold medal – first place	1984
CONMEBOL–UEFA Cup of Champions
Winner	1985
FIFA World Cup
Bronze medal – third place	1986
Representing Ivory Coast (as manager)
Africa Cup of Nations
Runner-up	2006
- * Club domestic league appearances and goals

Henri Louis Michel (28 October 1947 – 24 April 2018) was a French football player and coach. He played as a midfielder for Nantes and the France national team, and later went on to coach various clubs and national teams all over the world. He coached France at the 1986 World Cup, where they reached the semi-final, eventually managing a third–place finish; he also helped the Olympic squad win a gold medal in the 1984 edition of the tournament.

== Managerial career ==
=== France ===
Michel managed the France national team, guiding the gold medal at the 1984 Summer Olympics, and a third–place finish at the 1986 World Cup.

=== Cameroon ===
In 1994, he managed Cameroon. He coached Cameroon at the 1994 World Cup in the United States.

=== Morocco ===
Michel had two stints with Morocco, the first being between 1995 and 2000 – which included him managing the team at the 1998 World Cup edition.

His second stint, beginning in 2007, was short-lived with a poor showing at the Africa Cup of Nations 2008 where Morocco left in the first round. This resulted in his sacking from the post in February 2008.

=== Tunisia ===
From 2001 to 2002, he coached Tunisia. He was fired when Tunisia exited the 2002 African Cup of Nations in the first round after failing to score a single goal.

=== Ivory Coast ===
He joined the Ivorian national team after the departure of Robert Nouzaret around 2004. He managed with a young Ivorian team to come out first of their group ahead of Cameroon and Egypt, becoming the first coach to send Ivory Coast to the World Cup. In February 2006, He reached the Africa Cup of Nations final, but lost to Egypt on penalties. Later that year, he managed the Ivory Coast at the 2006 FIFA World Cup, where they played well but went home in the group stage after two defeats by Argentina and the Netherlands, before beating Serbia & Montenegro 3–2 in their final match.

=== El Zamalek ===
After the 2006 World Cup he joined the Egyptian club Zamalek. He left the club in 2007 to return to Morocco.

=== Sundowns ===
In 2008, he was appointed coach of Mamelodi Sundowns in South Africa. He left in March 2009 after being chased by an angry mob demanding his resignation.

=== El Zamalek ===
After two years turned back to El Zamalek on 30 August 2009 and on 30 November 2009 El Zamalek officials have fired the France national team coach due to negative results, the team was 15 points behind bitter rivals Al Ahly in the Egyptian league.

=== Raja Casablanca ===
Henri Michel was named Raja de Casablanca manager on 11 June 2010.

=== Equatorial Guinea ===
On 10 December 2010, Michel was hired head coach of the Equatorial Guinea to lead the team for 2012 Africa Cup of Nations they would co-host with Gabon. He suddenly resigned from his post on 19 October 2011, with the Africa Cup of Nations three months away, because he said he could not have the best players in the country, but five days later he was rehired thanks to the dismissal of Sports Minister Ruslan Obiang Nsue. On 21 December 2011, he resigned as coach of Equatorial Guinea again, citing interference from a "third party" as the reason for his departure.

=== Kenya ===
On 28 August 2012, Michel was named by the Football Kenya Federation (FKF) as the head coach of the Harambee Stars, taking over from James Nandwa, who was acting as manager on a caretaker basis. Barely four months later, he resigned, stating that he "could not find an amicable agreement within the deadlines regarding my compliance with several provisions of the contract". The FKF has also stated that they were disappointed with his attitude especially in looking down towards local tournaments, even describing the 2012 CECAFA Cup as useless and sent Nandwa to handle the team as interim coach.

== Death ==
Henri Michel died on 24 April 2018, aged 70. The cause of death was not disclosed.

== Playing statistics ==
Appearances and goals by national team and year
National team	Year	Apps	Goals
France	1967	3	0
France	1968	1	0
France	1969	5	1
France	1970	7	1
France	1971	7	0
France	1972	7	1
France	1973	5	0
France	1974	5	0
France	1975	6	1
France	1976	1	0
France	1977	1	0
France	1978	8	0
France	1979	1	0
France	1980	1	0
Total		58	4

Scores and results list France's goal tally first, score column indicates score after each Michel goal.

List of international goals scored by Henri Michel
No.	Date	Venue	Opponent	Score	Result	Competition	Ref.
1	30 April 1969	Parc des Princes, Paris, France	Romania	1–0	1–0	Friendly	
2	8 April 1970	Stade Robert Diochon, Le Petit-Quevilly, France	Bulgaria	1–1	1–1	Friendly	
3	2 September 1972	Karaiskakis Stadium, Piraeus, Greece	Greece	1–0	3–1	Friendly	
4	26 March 1975	Parc des Princes, Paris, France	Hungary	1–0	2–0	Friendly	

== Managerial statistics ==
Managerial record by team and tenure
Team	From	To	Record							
Team	From	To	G	W	D	L	GF	GA	GD	Win %
France	13 October 1984	22 October 1988	36	16	12	8	46	27	+19	44.44
Cameroon	16 March 1994	28 June 1994	8	1	4	3	10	16	−6	12.50
Morocco	17 November 1995	3 February 2000	53	31	13	9	95	39	+56	58.49
UAE	16 August 2000	11 May 2001	17	7	3	7	40	26	+14	41.18
Tunisia	28 November 2001	13 March 2002	7	2	3	2	8	4	+4	28.57
Ivory Coast	31 April 2004	21 June 2006	31	17	7	7	52	32	+20	54.84
Morocco	8 September 2007	28 January 2008	9	5	1	3	18	11	+7	55.56
Equatorial Guinea	8 February 2011	15 November 2011	9	4	1	4	11	10	+1	44.44
Kenya	16 October 2012	8 December 2012	8	3	1	4	10	9	+1	37.50
Total			178	86	45	47	290	174	+116	48.31

== Honours ==
Orders

- Knight of the Legion of Honour: 1999
