= 2006 Africa Cup of Nations final =

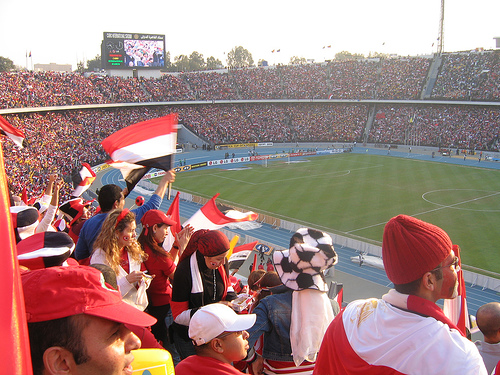
- Event: 2006 Africa Cup of Nations
Egypt	Ivory Coast
(Egypt)	(Ivory Coast)
0	0
- After extra time Egypt won 4–2 on penalties
- Date: 10 February 2006
- Venue: Cairo International Stadium, Cairo
- Referee: Mourad Daami (Tunisia)
- Attendance: 74,100
- Weather: Clear; 16 °C (61 °F)

The 2006 Africa Cup of Nations final was a football match that took place on 10 February 2006 at the Cairo International Stadium in Cairo, Egypt to determine the winner of the 2006 Africa Cup of Nations, the football championship of African nations organised by the Confederation of African Football (CAF).

Egypt won their fifth-ever AFCON after defeating the Ivory Coast 4–2 on penalties.

By the time of this match, Egypt were 32nd in the FIFA World Rankings (5th in Africa), while the Ivory Coast were ranked 42nd (7th in Africa).

== Match details ==
10 February 2006
18:00

Egypt	0–0 (a.e.t.)	Ivory Coast
	Report
Penalties
A. Hassan (penalty scored); Abdelwahab (penalty scored); Ali (penalty missed); Zaki (penalty scored); Aboutrika (penalty scored)	4–2	(penalty missed) Drogba; (penalty scored) K. Touré; (penalty missed) B. Koné; (penalty scored) Eboué

Cairo International Stadium, Cairo
Attendance: 74,100
Referee: Mourad Daami (Tunisia)

Egypt	Ivory Coast

GK	1	Essam El-Hadary
CB	20	Wael Gomaa		(substituted off) 21'
CB	4	Ibrahim Said		(substituted off) 113'
CB	5	Abdel-Zaher El-Saqqa	(yellow card) 75'
DM	11	Mohamed Shawky
RM	12	Mohamed Barakat
CM	17	Ahmed Hassan (c)	(yellow card) 56'
CM	22	Mohamed Aboutrika
LM	3	Mohamed Abdelwahab
CF	10	Emad Moteab		(substituted off) 81'
CF	19	Amr Zaki
Substitutions:
DF	7	Ahmed Fathy		(substituted on) 21'
MF	6	Hassan Mostafa		(substituted on) 81'
FW	14	Abdel Halim Ali		(substituted on) 113'
Manager:
Hassan Shehata

GK	1	Jean-Jacques Tizié	(yellow card) 119'
RB	21	Emmanuel Eboué	(yellow card) 53'
CB	4	Kolo Touré
CB	6	Blaise Kouassi	(yellow card) 43'
LB	3	Arthur Boka
DM	5	Didier Zokora
CM	19	Yaya Touré		(substituted off) 91'
CM	7	Emerse Faé
RW	9	Arouna Koné
LW	2	Kanga Akalé	(yellow card) 2'	(substituted off) 60'
CF	11	Didier Drogba (c)
Substitutions:
FW	8	Bonaventure Kalou		(substituted on) 60'
FW	14	Bakari Koné		(substituted on) 91'
Manager:
(France) Henri Michel

Assistant referees:
Célestin Ntagungira (Rwanda)
Ibrahim Djezzar (Algeria)
