= Abdoulaye M'Baye (footballer) =

Senegalese footballer

Personal information
- Date of birth: 13 November 1973 (age 52)
- Height: 1.90 m (6 ft 3 in)
- Position: Forward

Senior career*
Years	Team	Apps	(Gls)
- ASC Diaraf
- Stade Marocain
- Wydad de Fès
1998–1999	Wydad Casablanca		
1999–2000	Club Africain		
2000–2001	Tromsø	28	(9)
2002	Shanghai Zhongyuan Huili	26	(8)
2003	Vålerenga	3	(0)
2005	Aalesund	9	(1)

International career
1998–2000	Senegal	3	(1)
- * Club domestic league appearances and goals

Abdoulaye M'Baye (born 13 November 1973) is a Senegalese former professional football striker who played abroad in Morocco, Tunisia, Norway and China and for the national team.

== Club career ==
M'Baye purportedly started his career in ASC Diaraf, and then played in Morocco for Stade Marocain, Wydad de Fès and WAC Casablanca. M'Baye joined Club Africain in 1999, but went on to European football and Tromsø IL in June 2000. The transfer reportedly went through after agent Jon Thorstensen used singer Jørn Hoel as a liaison towards Tromsø. In the 2001 Tippeligaen he became Tromsø's top scorer with 6 goals, but the team was relegated.

In 2002 he left Tromsø, first going on trial with IK Start where he scored in four pre-season friendlies in a row. Set to sign for Start according to an interview on 6 March, two days later the same newspaper reported his signing for Chinese Shanghai Zhongyuan Huili. He scored 8 goals, but only carried out one year of his contract. In 2003 he did not play competitively for the first eight months of the year, until being signed by Vålerenga Fotball for the remainder of the season. In March 2005 he joined Aalesunds FK on a one-year contract. After fulfilling it he moved home to Senegal to commence various business ventures.

== International career ==
M'Baye was capped for Senegal and was a squad member for the 2000 African Cup of Nations.
