= Chantry Mvié Nguéma =

Gabonese footballer

Personal information
- Date of birth: 11 March 1980 (age 46)
- Position: Defender

International career
Years	Team	Apps	(Gls)
1999–2005	Gabon	13	(0)

Chantry Mvié Nguéma (born 11 March 1980) is a Gabonese former footballer who played as a defender. He made 13 appearances for the Gabon national team from 1999 to 2005. He was also named in Gabon's squad for the 2000 African Cup of Nations tournament.
