= Kabwe Kasongo =

Congolese footballer

Personal information
- Full name: Kabwe Kasongo
- Date of birth: 31 July 1970 (age 56)
- Place of birth: Kinshasa, DR Congo
- Height: 1.75 m (5 ft 9 in)
- Position: Left back

Senior career*
Years	Team	Apps	(Gls)
1990–1992	Lubumbashi Sport		
1992–1994	Daring Club		
1994–1996	Lubumbashi Sport		
1996–1997	Covilhã	20	(0)
1997–1999	Vitória Guimarães	39	(0)
1999–2008	Chaves	227	(2)

International career
1992–2002	DR Congo		
- * Club domestic league appearances and goals

Kabwe Kasongo (born 31 July 1970) is a Congolese retired footballer who played as a left back.

During his extensive career, spent mainly in Portugal, he is best known for his lengthy spell at Chaves, both as player and manager.

== Club career ==
Born in Kinshasa, Kasongo played in his country for Lubumbashi Sport and Daring Club Motema Pembe. In 1996, he moved to Portugal where he was to spend 12 years as a player, starting at S.C. Covilhã in the Liga de Honra then signing with Vitória de Guimarães from the Primeira Liga in the following season, being relatively used during over two years.

Kasongo joined G.D. Chaves in the 1999 summer, and played there until his retirement, collecting almost 300 official appearances and competing exclusively in the second tier apart from 2007–08, which was his last year. He retired at the age of 38, but remained with his main club as its assistant manager and helped it return to the second level for the 2009–10 campaign.

== International career ==
Kasongo made his debut for the Zaire national team in 1992, and played for them during a full decade. He represented his country at the 2000 Africa Cup of Nations held in Ghana and Nigeria, at which the country reached the group stage, conceding only once in three matches but failing to score.
