= Mubama Kibwey =

DR Congolese footballer (born 1970)

Yves Kibwey
Personal information
- Full name: Yves Mubama Kibwey
- Date of birth: 9 June 1970 (age 56)
- Place of birth: Kinshasa, DR Congo
- Height: 1.80 m (5 ft 11 in)
- Position: Forward

Youth career
- 1984–1985: Goussainville
- 1985–1987: Ris-Orangis
- 1987–1988: Viry-Châtillon

Senior career*
Years	Team	Apps	(Gls)
1988–1990	Viry-Châtillon		
1990–1992	Saint-Ouen-l'Aumône		
1992–1995	Saint-Leu-la-Forêt		
1995–1998	Muret	27	(8)
1998–2000	SO Châtellerault	56	(23)
2000	RCS La Chapelle	32	(21)
2001–2002	Académica	32	(12)
2002–2003	Leiria	12	(3)
2003	FC Maia		
2003–2004	Al-Shoalah		
2004–2009	SO Châtellerault	46	(14)

International career
2000	DR Congo	1	(0)
- * Club domestic league appearances and goals

Yves Mubama Kibwey (born 9 June 1970) is a DR Congolese former professional footballer who played as a forward.

== Club career ==
Kibwey was born in Kinshasa, DR Congo. He played with Red Star 93 of France in the Ligue 2 from 1993 to 1994.

After Red Star he moved to three other clubs in France and then moved to Portuguese club Académica. Académica was in Liga 2 at that time and with 12 goals he helped them progress to the top division of Portuguese football.

He then moved to Saudi Arabian club Al-Shoalah which was in Saudi First Division at the time.

He ended his career with a return to Châtellerault.

== International career ==
Kibwey made his professional debut for The Leopards on 27 January 2000, in the 2000 African Cup of Nations against the Bafana Boys in Group B losing 1–0 from a 44th-minute goal from Shaun Bartlett.
