= Ismaël Koudou =

Burkinabe footballer

Personal information
- Date of birth: 27 September 1975 (age 51)
- Place of birth: Ouagadougou, Upper Volta
- Height: 1.82 m (6 ft 0 in)
- Position: Forward

Youth career
- 1993–1995: ASFA Yennega

Senior career*
Years	Team	Apps	(Gls)
1995–2009	ASFA Yennega	58	(30)
2002–2004	→ WA Tlemcen (loan)	35	(7)
2005	→ Khaitan (loan)	24	(10)
2007–2008	→ Al Jahra (loan)		

International career
1997–2001	Burkina Faso	35	(0)
- * Club domestic league appearances and goals

Ismaël Koudou (born 27 September 1975) is a Burkinabé former professional footballer who played as a forward.

== Club career ==
Koudou began his career with ASFA Yennega. He joined WA Tlemcen on loan in summer 2002. In the Algerian Championnat National he played 55 games scoring, seven goals before returning to his homeclub ASFA Yennega in 2004. After a half year, he was again loaned out to Kuwaiti Division One club Khaitan but returned to ASFA Yennega in January 2006. After his return he played one year with the club and then signed for a second time in Kuwait for Al-Jahra in June 2007.

== International career ==
Koudou was part of the Burkina Faso national team's squad at the 1998 African Nations Cup in his home country, as well as the national squad that participated in the 2000 African Cup of Nations held in Nigeria and Ghana.
