= Guy-Roger Nzeng =

Gabonese footballer

Personal information
- Date of birth: 30 May 1970 (age 56)
- Place of birth: Libreville, Gabon
- Height: 1.77 m (5 ft 10 in)
- Position: Defender

Senior career*
Years	Team	Apps	(Gls)
1989–1991	Shellsport Port-Gentil		
1995–1996	Orlando Pirates	29	(0)
1997–1999	Paniliakos	9	(0)
1999–2000	Orlando Pirates	17	(1)
2000–2002	AmaZulu		
2002–2004	Orlando Pirates		
2005–2006	TP Akwembe		
2006–2008	FC 105 Libreville		
2006–2008	US Oyem		
2008–2009	CF Mounana		

International career
1991–2005	Gabon	61	(2)
- * Club domestic league appearances and goals

Guy-Roger Nzeng (born 30 May 1970) is a Gabonese former professional footballer who played as a defender.

Nzeng was a member of the Gabon squad for the 1996 and 2000 Africa Cup of Nations.
