= Jean-Kasongo Banza =

DR Congo footballer (1974–2024)

Personal information
- Date of birth: 26 June 1974
- Place of birth: Kinshasa, Zaire
- Date of death: 7 June 2024 (aged 49)
- Place of death: Kinshasa, DR Congo
- Position: Forward

Senior career*
Years	Team	Apps	(Gls)
1995–1996	AS Vita Club		
1996–1997	Gençlerbirliği	6	(0)
1997	Jeonnam Dragons	1	(0)
1997	Cheonan Ilhwa Chunma	1	(0)
1998	AS Vita Club		
1998–1999	CS Sfaxien		
1999–2000	VfL Wolfsburg	11	(2)
2000–2001	MSV Duisburg	7	(0)
2001–2002	CS Sfaxien		
2002–2003	Olympique Béja		

International career
1996–2001	DR Congo	25	(1)
Medal record
Representing DR Congo
Men's football
Africa Cup of Nations
Third place	1998 Burkina Faso
- * Club domestic league appearances and goals

Jean-Kasongo Banza (26 June 1974 – 7 June 2024) was a DR Congo professional footballer who played as a forward in DR Congo for AS Vita Club, in Turkey for Gençlerbirliği, in South Korea for Chunnam Dragons and Cheonan Ilhwa Chunma (currently Seongnam FC), in Tunisia for CS Sfaxien and Olympique Béja, and in Germany for VfL Wolfsburg and MSV Duisburg. At international level, he represented the DR Congo national team.

== Death ==
Banza died in Kinshasa on 7 June 2024, at the age of 49.

== Career statistics ==
=== International ===
Scores and results list DR Congo's goal tally first, score column indicates score after each Banza goal.

List of international goals scored by Jean-Kasongo Banza
No.	Date	Venue	Opponent	Score	Result	Competition
1	27 February 1998	Stade Municipal, Ouagadougou, Burkina Faso	Burkina Faso	2–4	4–4 (4–1 p)	1998 Africa Cup of Nations

== Honours ==
DR Congo

- African Cup of Nations: 3rd place, 1998
