= Steve Lekoelea =

South African soccer player

Personal information
- Full name: Steve Motsiri-Lekoelea
- Date of birth: 5 February 1979 (age 47)
- Place of birth: Sebokeng, South Africa
- Height: 1.71 m (5 ft 7 in)
- Position: Midfielder

Youth career
- Two For Joy
- Milton

Senior career*
Years	Team	Apps	(Gls)
1994–1995	Moroka Swallows	21	(4)
1995–2005	Orlando Pirates	194	(56)
2005–2008	Maritzburg United	13	(1)
2007–2009	Platinum Stars	17	(0)
–2011	Mbabane Highlanders	18	(0)

International career
1998–2002	South Africa	10	(0)
- * Club domestic league appearances and goals

Steve "Chippa" Lekoelea (born 5 February 1979 as Steve Motsiri) is a South African former soccer player who played as a midfielder. He played for Premier Soccer League clubs Moroka Swallows, Orlando Pirates and South Africa.

== Career ==
He was 15 years, 257 days old when he debuted for Moroka Swallows in 1994, and became the league's youngest scorer, aged 16 years, 7 days, when he scored against Umtata Bush Bucks on 12 February 1995. Lekoelea was playing under the name of Steve Motsiri at the time.

Lekoelea first appeared for the senior South Africa national football team as a teen.

- Previous clubs: Maritzburg United, Orlando Pirates, Moroka Swallows, Mbabane Highlanders
- Bafana Bafana caps won: 10
