= Sofiane Daoud =

Algerian footballer (born 1975)

Personal information
- Full name: Sofiane Daoud
- Date of birth: 8 January 1975 (age 51)
- Place of birth: Oran, Algeria
- Height: 1.75 m (5 ft 9 in)
- Position: Forward

Youth career
- –: RCG Oran

Senior career*
Years	Team	Apps	(Gls)
1993–1996	RCG Oran	-	(-)
1996–1998	IS Tighennif	-	(-)
1998–1999	SA Mohammadia	-	(-)
1999–2002	WA Tlemcen	-	(-)
2002–2005	MC Oran	-	(-)
2005–2006	Dubai Club	-	(-)
2006–2007	MC Oran	-	(-)
2007–2008	USM Annaba	-	(-)
2008–2009	MC Oran	-	(-)

International career
2004	Algeria U23	-	(-)
2004–2005	Algeria	7	(3)
- * Club domestic league appearances and goals

Sofiane Daoud (born 8 January 1975) is an Algerian footballer. He played his last season for MC Oran in the Algerian Championnat National of 2008–2009.

== Club career ==
- 1993-1997 RCG Oran
- 1997-1998 IS Tighennif
- 1998-1999 SA Mohammadia
- 1999-2002 WA Tlemcen
- 2002-2005 MC Oran
- 2005-2006 Dubai SC
- 2006-2007 MC Oran
- 2007-2008 USM Annaba
- 2008-2009 MC Oran

== Honours ==
- Won the Algerian Cup once with WA Tlemcen in 2002
- Has 7 caps and 3 goals for the Algerian National Team
