= Germain Mendome =

Gabonese footballer

Personal information
- Date of birth: 21 August 1970 (age 56)

International career
Years	Team	Apps	(Gls)
1992–2000	Gabon	33	(0)

Germain Mendome (born 21 August 1970) is a Gabonese footballer who plays as a goalkeeper. He played in 33 matches for the Gabon national football team from 1992 to 2000. He was also named in Gabon's squad for the 1994 African Cup of Nations tournament.
