= Patrick Apataki =

Democratic Republic of the Congo footballer (born 1979)

Personal information
- Full name: Patrick Kifu Apataki
- Date of birth: 14 May 1979 (age 47)
- Place of birth: Kinshasa, Zaire
- Height: 1.85 m (6 ft 1 in)
- Position: Striker

Youth career
- Bibicha Kinshasa

Senior career*
Years	Team	Apps	(Gls)
1999–2000	DC Motema Pembe		
2000–2001	Lokeren	2	(0)
2001–2002	Bursaspor	7	(0)
2002–2003	CS Sfaxien		
2003–2004	AS Marsa		
2004–2005	RCF Paris	21	(2)
2005–2006	FC Rouen	25	(2)
2006	AmaZulu	7	(0)
2007–2008	Mamelodi Sundowns	17	(1)
2008–2009	Dynamos	17	(1)
2009–2010	F.C. Cape Town	17	(1)
2011–2014	DC Motema Pembe	17	(1)
2014	Benfica do Lubango	10	(2)
2015	Sagrada Esperança	2	(0)
2015	Recreativo Caála	8	(1)
2016	Primeiro de Maio	0	(0)

International career
2000–2005	DR Congo	12	(0)
- * Club domestic league appearances and goals

Patrick Kifu Apataki (born 14 May 1979) is a DR Congo former professional footballer who played as a striker. He spent most of his career in South Africa and Angola.

== Club career ==
Apataki was born in Kinshasa, Zaire. He played for AmaZulu, FC Rouen, RCF Paris, AS Marsa, CS Sfaxien, Bursaspor, Lokeren, DC Motema Pembe. He was released by Mamelodi Sundowns at the end of the 2007–08 season, attended trials at Israeli club Bnei Sakhnin F.C. in August, but complications with travel documents appear to have scuppered his return to that country has been interest in his services from Premiership rookies Bay United. The Congolese striker believed his decision to join struggling First Division side Dynamos will boost his chances of a return to the Absa Premiership or a move overseas. In 2009 left Dynamos of the South African Premier Soccer League and joined to F.C. Cape Town.

== International career ==
Apataki was also member of the DR Congo national team.
