= Raphael Chukwu =

Nigerian international footballer

Personal information
- Full name: Raphael Ndukwe Chukwu
- Date of birth: 22 July 1975 (age 51)
- Place of birth: Aba, Abia, Nigeria
- Height: 1.90 m (6 ft 3 in)
- Position: Striker

Senior career*
Years	Team	Apps	(Gls)
1992–1993	Enyimba International		
1993–1995	Udoji United		
1995–1996	Shooting Stars	31	(21)
1996–1999	Mamelodi Sundowns	85	(46)
1999–2004	Bari	16	(1)
2000–2001	→ Mamelodi Sundowns	30	(12)
2003–2004	→ Çaykur Rizespor	11	(4)
2004	Mamelodi Sundowns	4	(0)

International career^{‡}
1995–2001	Nigeria	10	(3)
- * Club domestic league appearances and goals as of 5 November 2012 ‡ National team caps and goals as of 5 November 2012

Raphael Ndukwe Chukwu (born 22 July 1975) is a Nigerian international footballer who played as a striker.

== Career ==
Chukwu has played professionally in Nigeria, South-Africa, Italy, and Turkey for Enyimba International, Udoji United, Shooting Stars, Mamelodi Sundowns, Bari and Çaykur Rizespor.

He participated at the 2000 Africa Cup of Nations, scoring in the Final against Cameroon, and earned ten senior caps for Nigeria.

In September 2004 he was banned by FIFA for failing his contractual obligations towards Çaykur Rizespor.

== Career statistics ==
=== International ===
Appearances and goals by national team and year
National team	Year	Apps	Goals
Nigeria	1995	3	0
Nigeria	1996	2	0
Nigeria	1997	–	
Nigeria	1998	–	
Nigeria	1999	1	0
Nigeria	2000	2	1
Nigeria	2001	2	2
Total		10	3

Scores and results list Nigeria's goal tally first, score column indicates score after each Chukwu goal.

List of international goals scored by Raphael Chukwu
No.	Date	Venue	Opponent	Score	Result	Competition
1	13 February 2000	National Stadium, Lagos, Nigeria	Cameroon	1–2	2–2 (3–4 p)	2000 Africa Cup of Nations
2	13 September 2001	Daejeon World Cup Stadium, Daejeon, South Korea	South Korea	1–0	2–2	Friendly
3	13 September 2001	Daejeon World Cup Stadium, Daejeon, South Korea	South Korea	2–0	2–2	Friendly
