= Dikilu Bageta =

Congolese footballer (born 1978)

Personal information
- Full name: Serge Dikilu Bageta
- Date of birth: 24 March 1978 (age 48)
- Place of birth: Kinshasa, Zaire
- Height: 1.75 m (5 ft 9 in)
- Position: Defender

Youth career
- 1991–1996: E.P.B. Phenix

Senior career*
Years	Team	Apps	(Gls)
1997–2003	TP Mazembe	41	(0)
2001	→ Union Bilombe (loan)	22	(1)
2002	→ DCMP (loan)	30	(0)
2003–2005	Ajax Cape Town	44	(0)
2005–2006	TP Mazembe	21	(1)
2006–2008	Ajax Cape Town	49	(3)
2008–2010	Maritzburg United	49	(3)
2010–2011	Free State Stars F.C.	7	(0)

International career
1999–2007	DR Congo	28	(3)
- * Club domestic league appearances and goals

Serge Dikilu Bageta (born 24 March 1978) is a Congolese former professional footballer who played as a defender.

== Club career ==
Bageta was born in Kinshasa. He joined Ajax Cape Town in 2003, having previously played for DCMP and Tout Puissant Mazembe. After joining the club, Bageta played a key role in the centre of the Ajax defence. He left Ajax Cape Town in 2008 and joined South African league rival Maritzburg United.

== International career ==
Bageta was capped by DR Congo national team.
