= Shiva N'Zigou =

Gabonese footballer

Personal information
- Full name: Shiva Star N'Zigou
- Date of birth: 24 October 1978 (age 48)
- Place of birth: Tchibanga, Gabon
- Height: 1.75 m (5 ft 9 in)
- Position: Striker

Youth career
- 1992–1994: USM Libreville
- 1994–1997: Orambaka Nom Bakélé
- 1997–1998: Angers
- 1998–1999: Nantes

Senior career*
Years	Team	Apps	(Gls)
1999–2003	Nantes B	39	(11)
2001–2005	Nantes	33	(3)
2004–2005	→ Gueugnon (loan)	18	(5)
2005–2010	Reims	64	(9)
2011	Virton	5	(0)
2011	UR Namur		
2011–2013	Missile FC		
2013–2014	Vendée Fontenay Foot	22	(2)
2014–2015	Saint-Nazaire AF	0	(0)
2016–2017	FC Bouaye		
2017–2019	CO Cerizay		

International career
2000–2008	Gabon	25	(5)
- * Club domestic league appearances and goals

Shiva N'Zigou (born 24 October 1978) is a Gabonese former professional footballer who played as a striker.

== International career ==
For eighteen years, N'Zigou was believed to be the youngest player to both play and score at the Africa Cup of Nations; at the age of 16 years and 93 days, he scored in Gabon's 3–1 loss to South Africa at the 2000 Africa Cup of Nations. However, he admitted in 2018 that he lied about his age and that he is five years older than initially thought.

=== International goals ===
Scores and results list Gabon's goal tally first.

No.	Date	Venue	Opponent	Score	Result	Competition
1.	23 January 2000	Baba Yara Stadium, Kumasi, Ghana	South Africa	1–0	1–3	2000 Africa Cup of Nations
2.	15 November 2003	Stade Omar Bongo, Libreville, Gabon	Burundi	1–0	4–1	2006 FIFA World Cup qualification
3.	2 September 2006	Stade Omar Bongo, Libreville, Gabon	Madagascar	3–0	4–0	2008 Africa Cup of Nations qualification
4.	2 September 2006	Stade Omar Bongo, Libreville, Gabon	Madagascar	4–0	4–0	2008 Africa Cup of Nations qualification
5.	21 August 2007	Stade Dominique Duvauchelle, Paris, France	Benin	1–0	2–2	Friendly

== Personal life ==
N'Zigou lost his mother in 2001 and his father in 2004. The deaths of his parents affected his mental health.

In a religious ceremony in 2018, N'Zigou confessed that he had lied about his age, and that he had been five years older than previously believed. He also revealed that while he was a minor, he had engaged in incestuous sexual activity with his aunt and sister, and admitted to having had homosexual relationships with two friends of his, including one that was a long-term relationship. In the same ceremony, N'Zigou explained that his mother had been "sacrificed" by his father. He stated: "My mother died due to my football, she was sacrificed, in fact. Because I signed a lot of contracts and that brought a lot of money to the family, it brought discords. And my father, to keep all the money for himself, decided to sacrifice my mother so that her spirit would be attached to me and that I would succeed even more in football."
