= Frank Schoeman =

South African soccer player

Personal information
- Date of birth: 30 July 1975 (age 51)
- Place of birth: Cape Town, South Africa
- Height: 1.86 m (6 ft 1 in)
- Position: Defender

Senior career*
Years	Team	Apps	(Gls)
1997–1999	Bush Bucks	43	(1)
1999–2001	Lyngby	27	(0)
2001–2002	Mamelodi Sundowns	6	(0)
Total		76	(1)

International career
1999–2002	South Africa	14	(0)
- * Club domestic league appearances and goals

Frank Schoeman (born 30 July 1975) is a South African former soccer player who played at both professional and international levels as a defender. Schoeman played club football in South Africa for Bush Bucks and Mamelodi Sundowns, and in Denmark for Lyngby; he also earned thirteen caps for the South African national side between 1999 and 2001.

== Career statistics ==
=== International ===
Appearances and goals by national team and year
National team	Year	Apps	Goals
South Africa	1999	1	0
South Africa	2000	6	0
South Africa	2001	6	0
South Africa	2002	1	0
Total		14	0
