= Trott Moloto =

South African soccer coach

Trott Nchilo Moloto (born 19 July 1956 in Pietersburg) is a South African Association football coach.

== Coaching career ==
Among others, he previously coached South Africa, Mamelodi Sundowns, Maritzburg United and also had a stint at Tanzanian club Simba SC. leading Mamelodi Sundowns to 11 wins a row.
