= Dumisa Ngobe =

South African soccer player

Personal information
- Full name: Vincent Dumisa Ngobe
- Date of birth: 5 March 1973 (age 53)
- Place of birth: Witbank, South Africa
- Height: 1.74 m (5 ft 9 in)
- Position: Midfielder

Senior career*
Years	Team	Apps	(Gls)
1996–1997	Kaizer Chiefs	?	(?)
1997–1999	Orlando Pirates	55	(9)
1999–2000	Gençlerbirliği	13	(0)
2000–2001	Ankaragücü	37	(3)
2001–2002	Orlando Pirates	7	(0)
2002–2003	City Sharks Johannesburg	14	(1)
2003	A. Sebatspor	0	(0)
2004	Moroka Swallows	3	(0)
2004	Avendale Athletico	6	(0)
2005	Maritzburg United	8	(0)
2006	An Giang	?	(?)
2006–2008	Sabah FA	?	(?)
2008	Wits University	?	(?)

International career
1996–2001	South Africa	32	(2)
- * Club domestic league appearances and goals

Vincent Dumisani Ngobe (born 5 March 1973) is a South African former professional soccer player who played as a midfielder. He played 32 times for the South Africa national team and works currently as head of development for Mpumalanga Black Aces.

== International career ==
Ngobe earned 32 caps and scored 2 goals for South Africa national football team, being selected for 1997 FIFA Confederations Cup, 1998 and 2000 Africa Cup of Nations and 2000 Summer Olympics, the latter as an overaged player.
