= Papi Khomane =

South African soccer player (1975–2023)

Personal information
- Full name: Papi Isaac Khomane
- Date of birth: 31 January 1975
- Place of birth: South Africa
- Date of death: 25 November 2023 (aged 48)
- Height: 1.80 m (5 ft 11 in)
- Position: Defender

Senior career*
Years	Team	Apps	(Gls)
1994–1998	Jomo Cosmos	91	(0)
1998–2007	Orlando Pirates	151	(0)
Total		242	(0)

International career
1998–2000	South Africa	9	(0)
- * Club domestic league appearances and goals

Papi Khomane (31 January 1975 – 25 November 2023) was a South African professional soccer player who played as a defender. Khomane played club football for Jomo Cosmos and Orlando Pirates; he also earned nine caps for the South Africa national team between 1998 and 2000, featuring at AFCON 2000. He was killed in a car crash while travelling to Newcastle, KwaZulu-Natal, on 25 November 2023, at the age of 48. The crash also killed his mother and brother-in-law.
