= Maamar Mamouni =

Algerian footballer (born 1976)

Personal information
- Date of birth: 28 February 1976 (age 50)
- Place of birth: Tours, France
- Height: 1.84 m (6 ft 1/2 in)
- Position: Midfielder

Senior career*
Years	Team	Apps	(Gls)
1992–1995	Tours	53	(1)
1995–1996	Ajaccio	29	(0)
1996–2002	Le Havre	110	(7)
2002–2003	Créteil	19	(2)
2003–2004	Louviéroise	27	(7)
2004–2006	Gent	52	(3)
2006–2007	Lierse	-	(-)
2007–2008	Panserraikos		

International career
1999–2005	Algeria	29	(2)
- * Club domestic league appearances and goals

Maamar Mamouni (born 28 February 1976) is a former footballer. He played for clubs including Le Havre AC, US Créteil-Lusitanos (both France), Panserraikos (Greece), Louviéroise, Gent and Lierse (all Belgium). He was born in Tours, France, and holds both French and Algerian nationalities. He was a member of the Algerian 2004 African Nations Cup team, who finished second in their group in the first round of competition before being defeated by Morocco in the quarter-finals.

== National team statistics ==
Algeria national team
Year	Apps	Goals
1999	2	0
2000	9	0
2001	5	0
2002	0	0
2003	3	1
2004	9	1
2005	1	0
Total	29	2

== Honours ==
- La Louviére
  - Belgian Super Cup: Runner-up 2003
