= Bruno Zita Mbanangoyé =

Gabonese footballer

Bruno Zita
Personal information
- Full name: Bruno Mbanangoyé Zita
- Date of birth: 15 July 1980 (age 46)
- Place of birth: Port Gentil, Gabon
- Height: 1.72 m (5 ft 8 in)
- Position: Midfielder

Senior career*
Years	Team	Apps	(Gls)
1998–2001	Petrosport	16	(8)
2001–2005	AS Djerba	100	(19)
2005–2006	ES Zarzis	26	(7)
2006–2009	Dinamo Minsk	64	(16)
2009–2010	Sivasspor	17	(3)
2011–2012	Dinamo Minsk	46	(2)
2013–2016	Missile		
2016–2017	105 Libreville		
2018	Akanda		
Total		259	(55)

International career
1999–2012	Gabon	68	(11)
- * Club domestic league appearances and goals

Bruno Mbanangoyé Zita (born 15 July 1980) is a Gabonese former football who played as a midfielder. He was a member of the Gabon national team.

== Career ==
Zita began his career with Petrosport and joined in summer 2001 with AS Djerba. After four years with AS Djerba signed in summer 2005 with ES Zarzis. Zita left after five years in Tunisia and signed with the Belarusian club Dinamo Minsk in January 2006. Zita signed a two-year contract with Turkish side Sivasspor on 31 August 2009.

Zita re-signed with Dinamo Minsk in January 2011. He represented the Gabon national team at the 2012 African Cup of Nations, during which Gabon, as hosts of the competition, reached the quarter-finals.

== Career statistics ==
=== International ===
Appearances and goals by national team and year
National team	Year	Apps	Goals
Gabon	1999	9	3
Gabon	2000	6	1
Gabon	2001	–	
Gabon	2002	–	
Gabon	2003	6	2
Gabon	2004	3	0
Gabon	2005	6	0
Gabon	2006	–	
Gabon	2007	3	0
Gabon	2008	7	2
Gabon	2009	6	0
Gabon	2010	7	1
Gabon	2011	6	1
Gabon	2012	10	1
Total		69	11

Scores and results list Gabon's goal tally first, score column indicates score after each Mbanangoyé goal.

List of international goals scored by Bruno Zita Mbanangoyé
No.	Date	Venue	Opponent	Score	Result	Competition
1	7 November 1999	Stade Omar Bongo, Libreville, Gabon	Equatorial Guinea	2–0	4–0	1999 UNIFAC Cup
2	10 November 1999	Stade Omar Bongo, Libreville, Gabon	Central African Republic	1–0	1–0	1999 UNIFAC Cup
3	14 November 1999	Stade Omar Bongo, Libreville, Gabon	Chad	2–0	2–0	1999 UNIFAC Cup
4	29 January 2000	Kumasi Sports Stadium, Kumasi, Ghana	Algeria	1–2	1–3	2000 Africa Cup of Nations
5	31 May 2003	Stade Omar Bongo, Libreville, Gabon	Angola	1–0	1–1	Friendly
6	6 July 2003	Stade Omar Bongo, Libreville, Gabon	Sierra Leone	1–0	2–0	2004 African Cup of Nations qualification
7	7 September 2008	Seisa Ramabodu Stadium, Bloemfontein, South Africa	Lesotho	3–0	3–0	2010 FIFA World Cup qualification
8	11 October 2008	Stade Omar Bongo, Libreville, Gabon	Libya	1–0	1–0	2010 FIFA World Cup qualification
9	6 September 2010	Stade Maurice Chevalier, Cannes, France	Burkina Faso	1–0	1–1	Friendly
10	10 August 2011	Parc des Sports Michel Hidalgo, Sannois, France	Guinea	1–0	1–1	Friendly
11	27 January 2012	Stade d'Angondjé, Libreville, Gabon	Morocco	3–2	3–2	2012 Africa Cup of Nations
