= Mourad Daami =

Tunisian football referee

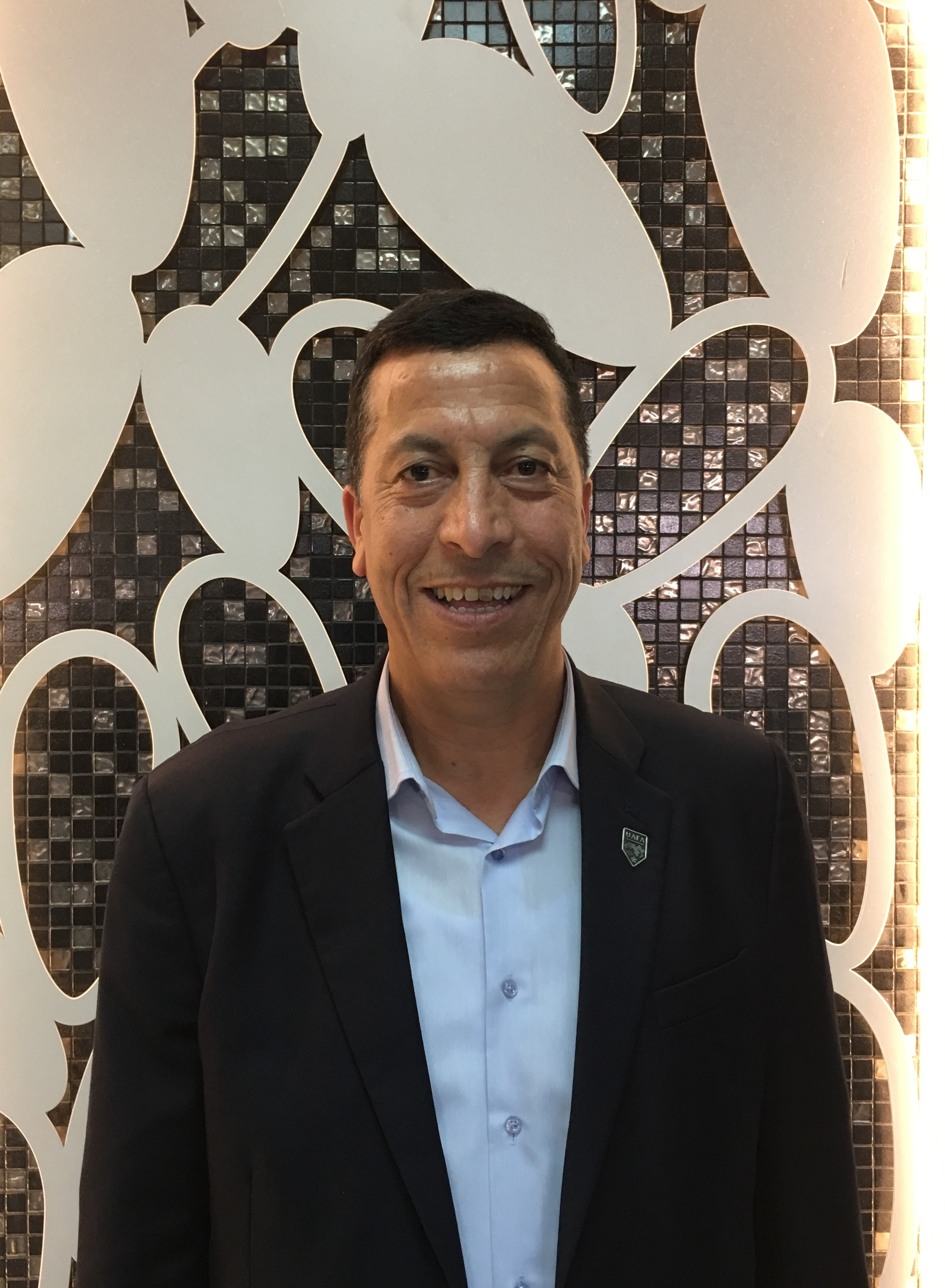
- Daami in 2019
- Born: August 15, 1962 (age 64); Monastir, Tunisia

International
Years	League	Role
1996–2006	FIFA-listed	Referee

Mourad Daami (Arabic: مراد الدعمي; born August 15, 1962) in Monastir is a retired Tunisian football referee. He is known for supervising the 2000 African Cup of Nations Final hosted by Nigeria and Ghana and one match during the 2002 FIFA World Cup co hosted by South Korea and Japan.

== Career ==
He began his career in 1996 and refereed one match at the 1998 CONCACAF Gold Cup, three matches at the 1999 FIFA World Youth Championship and two matches at the 2005 FIFA U-17 World Championship (one match).

He mainly officiated at the Africa Cup of Nations in 2000 (three matches including the final), 2002 (two matches) and 2006 (three matches including the final match), at the 2000 Summer Olympics (three matches) and at the 2005 FIFA Confederations Cup (one match). He also refereed a 2002 FIFA World Cup match between Mexico and Ecuador.

During the 2000 CAF Champions League final, played between Accra Hearts of Oak S.C. and Espérance Sportive de Tunis, he was banned from Confederation of African Football matches for a year for attempting to influence South African referee Robbie Williams, while he was part of the Tunisian club's delegation.
