= Abdel Hakim Shelmani =

Libyan football referee

Abdel Hakim Shelmani (Arabic: عبد الحكيم الشلمانى) is a soccer referee from Libya. He was selected as a referee for the CAF Champions League 2002 Final in Casablanca.

He officiated several matches at the 2001 FIFA World Youth Championship in Argentina. He also officiated two matches at the 2004 African Cup of Nations.
