= Nasreddine Kraouche =

Algerian footballer (born 1979)

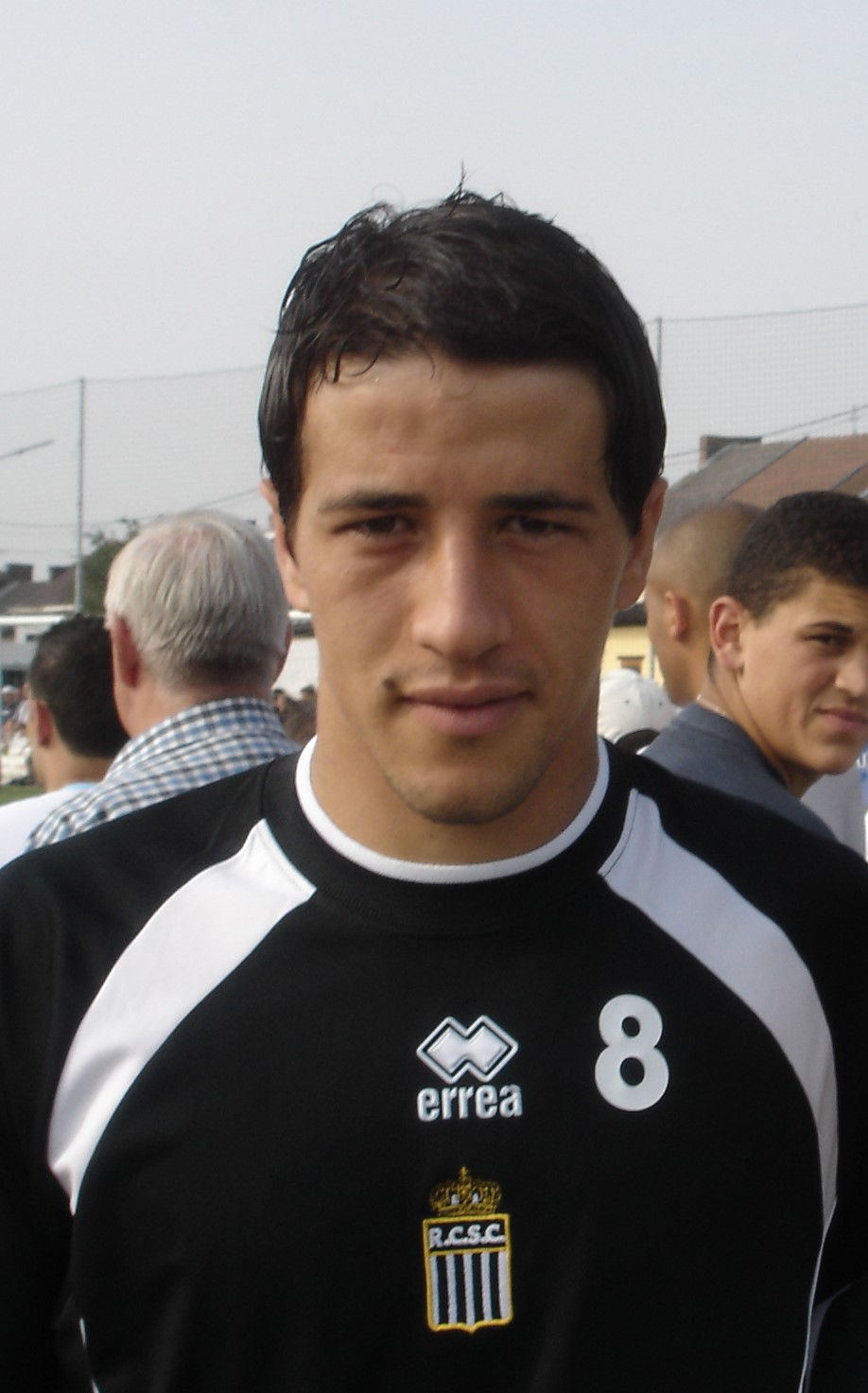

Personal information
- Full name: Nasreddine Kraouche
- Date of birth: 27 August 1979 (age 47)
- Place of birth: Thionville, France
- Height: 1.77 m (5 ft 10 in)
- Position: Midfielder

Youth career
- 1985–1994: Clouange
- 1994–1998: Metz

Senior career*
Years	Team	Apps	(Gls)
1998–2000	Metz	9	(0)
2000–2004	Gent	86	(15)
2004–2006	Charleroi	47	(3)
Total		142	(18)

International career
1999–2005	Algeria	37	(3)
- * Club domestic league appearances and goals

Nasreddine Kraouche (Arabic: نصر الدين كراوش; born 27 August 1979) is a former professional footballer who played as a midfielder. Born in France, he represented France at youth international level and Algeria at senior level.

== Career statistics ==
Algeria national team
Year	Apps	Goals
1999	1	0
2000	10	0
2001	5	1
2002	7	1
2003	6	1
2004	4	0
2005	4	0
Total	37	3
