= Alex Bapela =

South African footballer

Personal information
- Date of birth: 4 October 1969 (age 57)
- Place of birth: South Africa
- Position: Midfielder

Senior career*
Years	Team	Apps	(Gls)
1994–1997	Real Rovers	106	(29)
1997–2003	Mamelodi Sundowns	125	(31)
Total		231	(60)

International career
1999–2000	South Africa	6	(0)
- * Club domestic league appearances and goals

Alex Bapela (born 4 October 1969) is a South African former soccer player who played at both professional and international levels as a midfielder. Bapela played club football for Real Rovers and Mamelodi Sundowns; he also earned six caps for the South African national side between 1999 and 2000.
