= 2000 African Cup of Nations =

22nd edition of the Africa Cup of Nations

- African Cup of Nations 2000 official logo

Tournament details
- Host countries: Ghana; Nigeria
- Dates: 22 January – 13 February
- Teams: 16
- Venues: 4 (in 4 host cities)

Final positions
- Champions: Cameroon (3rd title)
- Runners-up: Nigeria
- Third place: South Africa
- Fourth place: Tunisia

Tournament statistics
- Matches played: 32
- Goals scored: 73 (2.28 per match)
- Attendance: 677,500 (21,172 per match)
- Top scorer: (South Africa) Shaun Bartlett (5 goals)
- Best player: (Cameroon) Lauren

The 2000 African Cup of Nations was the 22nd edition of the Africa Cup of Nations, the association football championship of Africa (CAF). It was co-hosted by Ghana and Nigeria, who jointly replaced Zimbabwe as host. Just like in 1998, the field of sixteen teams was split into four groups of four.

Cameroon won the championship, beating Nigeria in the final 4–3 on penalties. As winners, they qualified for the 2001 FIFA Confederations Cup as African representatives.

== Host selection ==
It was expected that Zimbabwe will host this edition but it was sidelined by the CAF on 8 February 1999 in Abidjan, Ivory Coast for non-compliance with the specifications, the CAF announced that they would be receiving applications for the new hosts until 10 March 1999.

Bids:

- Egypt (withdrew)
- Ghana / Nigeria (selected as hosts)
- Morocco

Egypt, Ghana, Morocco and Nigeria, were determined by the CAF to be compliant with the host criteria. Later, Egypt withdrew. A joint bid was formed between Ghana and Nigeria.

The organization of the 2000 Africa Cup of Nations was awarded jointly to Ghana and Nigeria on 15 March 1999 by the CAF Executive Committee meeting in Cairo, Egypt. Voters had a choice between three countries : Ghana, Morocco and Nigeria. This is the first time ever that the African Cup was co-hosted by two countries.

This is also the second time that Nigeria has hosted the African Cup after 1980 and the third time for Ghana after 1963 and 1978.

== Qualified teams ==
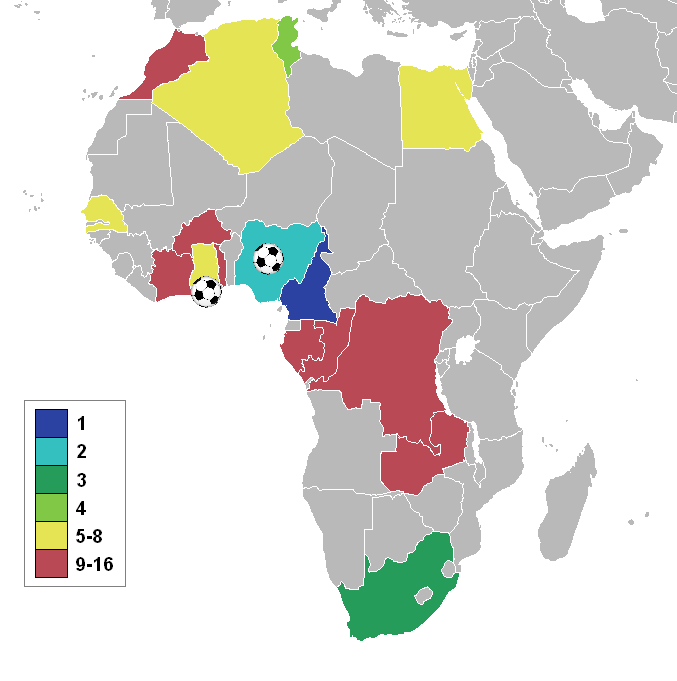
Participating nations

Team	Qualified as	Qualified on	Previous appearances in tournament (Note: Bold indicates champion for that year, Italic indicates host.)
Egypt	Holders	28 February 1998	16 (**1957**, **1959**, 1962, 1963, 1970, 1974, 1976, 1980, 1984, **1986**, 1988, 1990, 1992, 1994, 1996, **1998**)
Ghana	Co-hosts		12 (**1963**, **1965**, 1968, 1970, **1978**, 1980, **1982**, 1984, 1992, 1994, 1996, 1998)
Nigeria	Co-hosts		10 (1963, 1976, 1978, **1980**, 1982, 1984, 1988, 1990, 1992, **1994**)
Burkina Faso	Group 5 winners	6 June 1999	3 (1978, 1996, 1998)
Cameroon	Group 1 winners	6 June 1999	10 (1970, 1972, 1982, **1984**, 1986, **1988**, 1990, 1992, 1996, 1998)
Morocco	Group 2 winners	6 June 1999	8 (1972, **1976**, 1978, 1980, 1986, 1988, 1992, 1998)
Algeria	Group 7 runners-up	20 June 1999	10 (1968, 1980, 1982, 1984, 1986, 1988, **1990**, 1992, 1996, 1998)
Congo	Group 3 runners-up	20 June 1999	5 (1968 **1972**, 1974, 1978, 1992)
DR Congo	Group 6 runners-up	20 June 1999	11 (1965, **1968**, 1970, 1972, **1974**, 1976, 1988, 1992, 1994, 1996, 1998)
Gabon	Group 4 runners-up	20 June 1999	2 (1994, 1996)
Ivory Coast	Group 3 winners	20 June 1999	13 (1965, 1968, 1970, 1974, 1980, 1984, 1986, 1988, 1990, **1992**, 1994, 1996, 1998)
South Africa	Group 4 winners	20 June 1999	2 (**1996**, 1998)
Togo	Group 2 runners-up	20 Jun 1999	3 (1972, 1984, 1998)
Tunisia	Group 7 winners	20 June 1999	8 (1962, 1963, 1965, 1978, 1982, 1994, 1996, 1998)
Zambia	Group 6 winners	20 June 1999	9 (1974, 1978, 1982, 1986, 1990, 1992, 1994, 1996, 1998)
Senegal	Playoff winners	21 August 1999	6 (1965, 1968, 1986, 1990, 1992, 1994)

== Venues ==
(Ghana) Accra	(Ghana) Kumasi	(Nigeria) Lagos	(Nigeria) Kano
Accra Sports Stadium	Baba Yara Stadium	National Stadium	Sani Abacha Stadium
Capacity: 40,000	Capacity: 51,500	Capacity: 55,000	Capacity: 25,000
2000 African Cup of Nations is located in Ghana		2000 African Cup of Nations is located in Nigeria	

== First round ==
Teams highlighted in green progress to the Quarter Finals.

All times local: GMT (UTC) and WAT (UTC +1)

=== Group A ===
Group A of the 2000 AFCON remains as the only group stage that all four teams to achieve four points out of three matches.

Pos	Team	Pld	W	D	L	GF	GA	GD	Pts	Qualification
1	Cameroon	3	1	1	1	4	2	+2	4	Advance to knockout stage
2	Ghana (H)	3	1	1	1	3	3	0	4	Advance to knockout stage
3	Ivory Coast	3	1	1	1	3	4	−1	4	
4	Togo	3	1	1	1	2	3	−1	4	

Source: CAF
(H) Hosts
22 January 2000
16:00

Ghana	1–1	Cameroon
Ayew 57'		Foé 19'

Accra Sports Stadium, Accra
Attendance: 45,000
Referee: Ali Bujsaim (United Arab Emirates)
24 January 2000
16:00

Ivory Coast	1–1	Togo
Guel 38' (pen.)		Ouadja 62'

Accra Sports Stadium, Accra
Attendance: 13,000
Referee: Tessema Hailemalak (Ethiopia)

27 January 2000
16:00

Ghana	2–0	Togo
Ayew 28'; Addo 37'

Accra Sports Stadium, Accra
Attendance: 30,000
Referee: Abderrahim Al-Arjoune (Morocco)
28 January 2000
19:45

Cameroon	3–0	Ivory Coast
Kalla 29'; Eto'o 45'; M'Boma 90'

Accra Sports Stadium, Accra
Attendance: 5,000
Referee: Mourad Daami (Tunisia)

31 January 2000
16:00

Ghana	0–2	Ivory Coast
		Kalou 45'; Sié 84'

Accra Sports Stadium, Accra
Attendance: 40,000
Referee: Gamal Al-Ghandour (Egypt)
31 January 2000
16:00

Cameroon	0–1	Togo
		Tchangai 18'

Baba Yara Stadium, Kumasi
Attendance: 2,000
Referee: Olufunmi Olaniyan (Nigeria)

=== Group B ===
Pos	Team	Pld	W	D	L	GF	GA	GD	Pts	Qualification
1	South Africa	3	2	1	0	5	2	+3	7	Advance to knockout stage
2	Algeria	3	1	2	0	4	2	+2	5	Advance to knockout stage
3	DR Congo	3	0	2	1	0	1	−1	2	
4	Gabon	3	0	1	2	2	6	−4	1	

Source: CAF
23 January 2000
19:45

South Africa	3–1	Gabon
Ngobe 43'; Bartlett 55', 78'		Nzigou 21'

Baba Yara Stadium, Kumasi
Attendance: 20,000
Referee: Gamal Al-Ghandour (Egypt)
24 January 2000
19:45

DR Congo	0–0	Algeria

Baba Yara Stadium, Kumasi
Attendance: 7,000
Referee: Manuel Duarte (Cape Verde)

27 January 2000
19:45

South Africa	1–0	DR Congo
Bartlett 44'

Baba Yara Stadium, Kumasi
Attendance: 3,500
Referee: Olufunmi Olaniyan (Nigeria)
29 January 2000
19:45

Algeria	3–1	Gabon
Ghazi 12'; Tasfaout 41'; Dziri 89'		Mbanangoyé 89'

Baba Yara Stadium, Kumasi
Attendance: 5,000
Referee: Isaak Abdulkadir (Tanzania)

2 February 2000
16:00

South Africa	1–1	Algeria
Bartlett 2'		Moussouni 53'

Baba Yara Stadium, Kumasi
Attendance: 2,000
Referee: Tessema Hailemalak (Ethiopia)
2 February 2000
16:00

DR Congo	0–0	Gabon

Accra Sports Stadium, Accra
Attendance: 2,000
Referee: Abderrahim Al-Arjoune (Morocco)

=== Group C ===
Pos	Team	Pld	W	D	L	GF	GA	GD	Pts	Qualification
1	Egypt	3	3	0	0	7	2	+5	9	Advance to knockout stage
2	Senegal	3	1	1	1	5	4	+1	4	Advance to knockout stage
3	Zambia	3	0	2	1	3	5	−2	2	
4	Burkina Faso	3	0	1	2	4	8	−4	1	

Source: CAF
23 January 2000
18:30

Egypt	2–0	Zambia
Radwan 37'; H. Hassan 50'

Sani Abacha Stadium, Kano
Attendance: 18,000
Referee: Coffi Codjia (Benin)
25 January 2000
17:00

Burkina Faso	1–3	Senegal
Sanou 65'		Camara 4'; Sarr 45'; Keita 86'

Sani Abacha Stadium, Kano
Attendance: 12,000
Referee: Abdel Hakim Shelmani (Libya)

28 January 2000
18:30

Egypt	1–0	Senegal
H. Hassan 39'

Sani Abacha Stadium, Kano
Attendance: 30,000
Referee: Petros Mathabela (South Africa)
29 January 2000
18:30

Zambia	1–1	Burkina Faso
Lota 16'		Ouédraogo 90'

Sani Abacha Stadium, Kano
Attendance: 5,000
Referee: Abdel Hakim Shelmani (Libya)

1 February 2000
17:00

Egypt	4–2	Burkina Faso
Salah Hosny 30'; H. Hassan 75' (pen.); Ramzy 85'; Ali 90'		Koudou 10'; Sanou 24'

Sani Abacha Stadium, Kano
Attendance: 17,000
Referee: Pierre Mounguegui (Gabon)
1 February 2000
17:00

Zambia	2–2	Senegal
Chilembe 52'; Bwalya 87' (pen.)		Camara 47'; Mbaye 80'

National Stadium, Lagos
Attendance: 2,000
Referee: Alex Quartey (Ghana)

=== Group D ===
Pos	Team	Pld	W	D	L	GF	GA	GD	Pts	Qualification
1	Nigeria (H)	3	2	1	0	6	2	+4	7	Advance to knockout stage
2	Tunisia	3	1	1	1	3	4	−1	4	Advance to knockout stage
3	Morocco	3	1	1	1	1	2	−1	4	
4	Congo	3	0	1	2	0	2	−2	1	

Source: CAF
(H) Hosts
23 January 2000
16:00

Nigeria	4–2	Tunisia
Okocha 28', 58'; Ikpeba 71', 77'		Sellimi 49'; Baya 90'

National Stadium, Lagos
Attendance: 80,000
Referee: Alain Sars (France)
25 January 2000
19:30

Morocco	1–0	Congo
Bassir 85'

National Stadium, Lagos
Attendance: 8,000
Referee: Alex Quartey (Ghana)

28 January 2000
16:00

Nigeria	0–0	Congo

National Stadium, Lagos
Attendance: 60,000
Referee: Felix Tangawarima (Zimbabwe)
29 January 2000
16:00

Tunisia	0–0	Morocco

National Stadium, Lagos
Attendance: 5,000
Referee: Falla N'Doye (Senegal)

3 February 2000
17:00

Nigeria	2–0	Morocco
George 28'; Aghahowa 81'

National Stadium, Lagos
Attendance: 60,000
Referee: Coffi Codjia (Benin)
3 February 2000
17:00

Tunisia	1–0	Congo
Jaïdi 18'

Sani Abacha Stadium, Kano
Attendance: 12,000
Referee: Ali Bujsaim (United Arab Emirates)

== Knockout stage ==
Quarter-finals
6 February – Accra
Cameroon	2
Algeria	1
7 February – Kano
Egypt	0
Tunisia	1
6 February – Kumasi
South Africa	1
Ghana	0
7 February – Lagos
Nigeria (a.e.t.)	2
Senegal	1

Semi-finals
10 February – Accra
Cameroon	3
Tunisia	0
10 February – Lagos
South Africa	0
Nigeria	2

Final
13 February – Lagos
Cameroon (p)	2 (4)
Nigeria	2 (3)
Third place
12 February – Accra
Tunisia	2 (3)
South Africa (p)	2 (4)

=== Quarter-finals ===
6 February 2000
16:00

Cameroon	2–1	Algeria
Eto'o 7'; Foé 24'		Tasfaout 79'

Accra Sports Stadium, Accra
Attendance: 15,000
Referee: Falla N'Doye (Senegal)

6 February 2000
19:30

South Africa	1–0	Ghana
Nomvethe 42'

Kumasi Sports Stadium, Kumasi
Attendance: 40,000
Referee: Mourad Daami (Tunisia)

7 February 2000
16:00

Egypt	0–1	Tunisia
		Badra 22' (pen.)

Sani Abacha Stadium, Kano
Attendance: 12,000
Referee: Alain Sars (France)

7 February 2000
19:00

Nigeria	2–1 (a.e.t.)	Senegal
Aghahowa 85', 92'		Fadiga 7'

National Stadium, Lagos
Attendance: 60,000
Referee: Felix Tangawarima (Zimbabwe)

=== Semi-finals ===
10 February 2000
16:30

Nigeria	2–0	South Africa
Babangida 1', 34'

National Stadium, Lagos
Attendance: 60,000
Referee: Gamal Al-Ghandour (Egypt)

10 February 2000
18:30

Cameroon	3–0	Tunisia
M'Boma 49', 85'; Eto'o 81'

Accra Sports Stadium, Accra
Attendance: 6,000
Referee: Ali Bujsaim (United Arab Emirates)

=== Third place match ===
12 February 2000
16:00

South Africa	2–2 (a.e.t.)	Tunisia
Bartlett 11'; Nomvethe 62'	Report	Zitouni 27', 89'
Penalties
Bartlett (penalty missed); Mkhalele (penalty scored); Ndlanya (penalty missed); Tinkler (penalty scored); Moshoeu (penalty scored); Bapela (penalty scored)	4–3	(penalty missed) Chihi; (penalty missed) Jaziri; (penalty scored) Gabsi; (penalty scored) Boukadida; (penalty scored) Badra; (penalty missed) Zitouni

Accra Sports Stadium, Accra
Attendance: 1,000
Referee: Coffi Codjia (Benin)

=== Final ===
13 February 2000
16:00

Nigeria	2–2 (a.e.t.)	Cameroon
Chukwu 45'; Okocha 47'	Report	Eto'o 26'; M'Boma 31'
Penalties
Okocha (penalty scored); Okpara (penalty scored); Kanu (penalty missed); Ikpeba (penalty missed); Oliseh (penalty scored)	3–4	(penalty scored) M'Boma; (penalty scored) Wome; (penalty scored) Geremi; (penalty missed) Foé; (penalty scored) Song

National Stadium, Lagos
Attendance: 60,000
Referee: Mourad Daami (Tunisia)

== Statistics ==
=== Goalscorers ===
There were 73 goals scored in 32 matches, for an average of 2.28 goals per match.

5 goals

- (South Africa) Shaun Bartlett

4 goals

- (Cameroon) Samuel Eto'o
- (Cameroon) Patrick M'Boma

3 goals

- (Egypt) Hossam Hassan
- (Nigeria) Julius Aghahowa
- (Nigeria) Jay-Jay Okocha

2 goals

- (Algeria) Abdelhafid Tasfaout
- (Burkina Faso) Ousmane Sanou
- (Cameroon) Marc-Vivien Foé
- (Ghana) Kwame Ayew
- (Nigeria) Tijani Babangida
- (Nigeria) Victor Ikpeba
- (Senegal) Henri Camara
- (South Africa) Siyabonga Nomvethe
- (Tunisia) Ali Zitouni

1 goal

- (Algeria) Billel Dziri
- (Algeria) Farid Ghazi
- (Algeria) Fawzi Moussouni
- (Burkina Faso) Ismaël Koudou
- (Burkina Faso) Alassane Ouédraogo
- (Cameroon) Raymond Kalla
- (Egypt) Abdel Halim Ali
- (Egypt) Yasser Radwan
- (Egypt) Hany Ramzy
- (Egypt) Ahmed Salah Hosny
- (Gabon) Bruno Mbanangoyé
- (Gabon) Shiva N'Zigou
- (Ghana) Otto Addo
- (Ivory Coast) Tchiressoua Guel
- (Ivory Coast) Bonaventure Kalou
- (Ivory Coast) Donald-Olivier Sié
- (Morocco) Salaheddine Bassir
- (Nigeria) Raphael Chukwu
- (Nigeria) Finidi George
- (Senegal) Khalilou Fadiga
- (Senegal) Salif Keita
- (Senegal) Abdoulaye Mbaye
- (Senegal) Pape Sarr
- (South Africa) Dumisa Ngobe
- (Togo) Lantame Ouadja
- (Togo) Massamasso Tchangai
- (Tunisia) Walid Azaiez
- (Tunisia) Khaled Badra
- (Tunisia) Radhi Jaïdi
- (Tunisia) Adel Sellimi
- (Zambia) Kalusha Bwalya
- (Zambia) Laughter Chilembe
- (Zambia) Dennis Lota

=== Team of the tournament ===
The following players were selected in the 2000 African Cup of Nations Team of the Tournament for their performances throughout the tournament.

Goalkeepers	Defenders	Midfielders	Forwards
(Egypt) Nader El-Sayed	(Senegal) Pape Malick Diop (Tunisia) Khaled Badra (Cameroon) Rigobert Song (Egypt) Mohamed Emara	(Algeria) Billel Dziri (Cameroon) Lauren (Nigeria) Jay-Jay Okocha (Senegal) Khalilou Fadiga	(Cameroon) Samuel Eto'o (Cameroon) Patrick Mboma

=== Tournament rankings ===
Ranking criteria
Teams are ranked according to the round in which they were eliminated, with the teams eliminated in the same round ranked according to their results and goal difference in that round.

Pos.	Team	G	Pld	W	D	L	Pts	GF	GA	GD
1	Cameroon	6	4	2	0	14	11	5	+6	
2	Nigeria	6	4	1	1	13	12	8	+4	
3	South Africa	B	6	3	2	1	11	8	5	+3
4	Tunisia	D	5	1	2	2	5	5	8	−3
Eliminated in the quarter-finals
5	Algeria	B	4	1	2	1	5	5	4	+1
6	Ghana	A	4	1	1	2	4	3	4	−1
7	Egypt	C	4	3	0	1	9	7	3	+4
8	Senegal	C	4	1	1	2	4	6	6	0
Eliminated in the group stage
9	Ivory Coast	A	3	1	1	1	4	3	4	−1
10	Zambia	C	3	0	2	1	2	3	5	−2
11	Togo	A	3	1	1	1	4	2	3	−1
12	Morocco	D	3	1	1	1	4	1	2	−1
13	DR Congo	B	3	0	2	1	2	0	1	−1
14	Burkina Faso	C	3	0	1	2	1	4	8	−4
15	Gabon	B	3	0	1	2	1	2	6	−4
16	Congo	D	3	0	1	2	1	0	2	−2
