= Vénuste Baboula =

Central African footballer (1998)

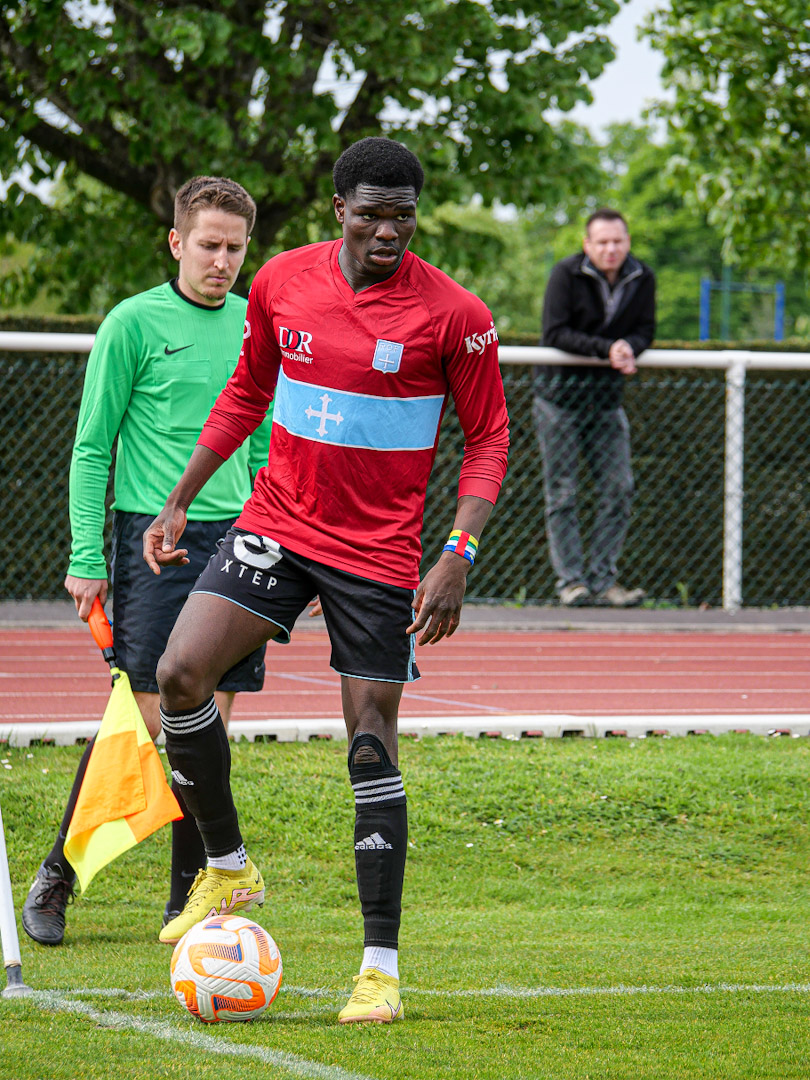
- Baboula (in red) in 2023

Personal information
- Full name: Ghislain Vénuste Baboula
- Date of birth: 23 August 1998 (age 28)
- Place of birth: Bangui, Central African Republic
- Height: 1.80 m (5 ft 11 in)
- Position: Left winger

Team information
- Current team: Slovan Liberec

Senior career*
Years	Team	Apps	(Gls)
2019–2020	Maccabi Paris		
2020–2023	Racing Club de France	48	(13)
2023–2025	Quevilly-Rouen	8	(0)
2023–2025	Quevilly-Rouen B	5	(0)
2024	→ Versailles (loan)	5	(0)
2025–2026	Bravo	18	(3)
2026–	Slovan Liberec	0	(0)

International career^{‡}
2023–	Central African Republic	20	(4)
- * Club domestic league appearances and goals as of 25 June 2025 ‡ National team caps and goals as of 12 October 2025

Ghislain Vénuste Baboula (born 23 August 1998), known as Vénuste Baboula, is a Central African professional footballer who plays as a left winger for Czech club Slovan Liberec and the Central African Republic national team.

== Club career ==
In the 2022–23 Championnat National 2 season with Racing Club de France, Baboula scored nine goals in twenty-five matches. On 6 June 2023, he signed for Ligue 2 club Quevilly-Rouen on a three-year contract.

On 23 January 2025, Baboula moved to Bravo in Slovenia.

On 22 June 2026, Baboula signed a contract with Czech First League club Slovan Liberec until summer 2030.

== International career ==
Baboula made his debut for the Central African Republic national team in a 3–0 Africa Cup of Nations qualification victory over Madagascar on 23 March 2023.

== Career statistics ==
Scores and results list the Central African Republic's goal tally first, score column indicates score after each Baboula goal.

List of international goals scored by Vénuste Baboula
No.	Date	Venue	Opponent	Score	Result	Competition
1	22 March 2024	Colombo Racecourse, Colombo, Sri Lanka	Bhutan	3–0	6–0	2024 FIFA Series
2	22 March 2024	Colombo Racecourse, Colombo, Sri Lanka	Bhutan	6–0	6–0	2024 FIFA Series
3	5 June 2024	Honor Stadium, Oujda, Morocco	Chad	1–0	1–0	2026 FIFA World Cup qualification
4	12 October 2025	Stade Olympique Maréchal Idriss Déby Itno, N'Djamena, Chad	Chad	2–0	3–2	2026 FIFA World Cup qualification

== Honours ==
Racing Club de France

- Championnat National 3: 2021–22
