= 2026 FIFA World Cup qualification – CAF Group I =

Association football competition in Africa

The 2026 FIFA World Cup qualification – CAF Group I was a CAF qualifying group for the 2026 FIFA World Cup. The group contained Mali, Ghana, Madagascar, Central African Republic, Comoros and Chad.

The group winners, Ghana, directly qualified for the World Cup. The group runners-up, Madagascar, were eliminated as one of the five worst runners-up.

== Standings ==
Pos	Team	Pld	W	D	L	GF	GA	GD	Pts	Qualification	(Ghana)	(Madagascar)	(Mali)	(Comoros)	(Central African Republic)	(Chad)
1	Ghana	10	8	1	1	23	6	+17	25	2026 FIFA World Cup	—	1–0	1–0	1–0	4–3	5–0
2	Madagascar	10	6	1	3	17	12	+5	19		0–3	—	0–0	2–1	2–0	3–1
3	Mali	10	5	3	2	17	6	+11	18		1–2	4–1	—	3–0	1–1	3–1
4	Comoros	10	5	0	5	12	13	−1	15		1–0	1–2	0–3	—	4–2	1–0
5	Central African Republic	10	2	2	6	11	24	−13	8		0–5	1–4	0–0	0–2	—	1–0
6	Chad	10	0	1	9	5	24	−19	1		1–1	0–3	0–2	0–2	2–3	—

Source: FIFA
Rules for classification: Tiebreakers

== Matches ==
17 November 2023
16:00 UTC+3

Comoros	4–2	Central African Republic
M'Dahoma 29'; Youssouf 50'; Saïd 58'; Maolida 67'	Report	Abdallah 10' (o.g.); Zahary 74' (o.g.)

Stade de Moroni, Moroni
Referee: Ibrahim Kalilou Traore (Ivory Coast)
17 November 2023
16:00 UTC+0

Ghana	1–0	Madagascar
Williams 90+6'	Report

Baba Yara Stadium, Kumasi
Attendance: 45,000
Referee: Samir Guezzaz (Morocco)
17 November 2023
19:00 UTC+0

Mali	3–1	Chad
K. Doumbia 45'; Y. Niakaté 77'; Sissoko 81'	Report	Mouandilmadji 53'

Stade du 26 Mars, Bamako
Referee: Ahmad Imtehaz Heeralall (Mauritius)

20 November 2023
20:00 UTC+1

Chad	0–3	Madagascar
	Report	Rakotoharimalala 10', 84'; Lapoussin 90+1'

Honor Stadium, Oujda (Morocco)
Attendance: 3,000
Referee: Tewodros Mitiku (Ethiopia)
20 November 2023
19:00 UTC+0

Mali	1–1	Central African Republic
K. Doumbia 76'	Report	Kondogbia 79'

Stade du 26 Mars, Bamako
Attendance: 30,000
Referee: Georges Gatogato (Burundi)
21 November 2023
19:00 UTC+3

Comoros	1–0	Ghana
Maolida 43'	Report

Stade de Moroni, Moroni
Attendance: 11,628
Referee: Abdel Aziz Mohamed Bouh (Mauritania)

5 June 2024
17:00 UTC+1

Central African Republic	1–0	Chad
Baboula 29'	Report

Honor Stadium, Oujda (Morocco)
Attendance: 1,300
Referee: Patrice Milazare (Mauritius)
6 June 2024
19:00 UTC+0

Mali	1–2	Ghana
K. Doumbia 45+1'	Report	Nuamah 58'; J. Ayew 90+4'

Stade du 26 Mars, Bamako
Attendance: 50,200
Referee: Amin Omar (Egypt)
7 June 2024
18:00 UTC+2

Madagascar	2–1	Comoros
Raveloson 1', 66'	Report	Ben Nabouhane 90+4'

FNB Stadium, Johannesburg (South Africa)
Referee: Jean-Jacques Ndala (DR Congo)

10 June 2024
19:00 UTC+0

Ghana	4–3	Central African Republic
J. Ayew 6' (pen.), 60', 69'; Fatawu 62'	Report	Mafouta 11', 41', 90'

Baba Yara Stadium, Kumasi
Attendance: 39,000
Referee: Abdulrazg Ahmed (Libya)
11 June 2024
15:00 UTC+2

Madagascar	0–0	Mali
	Report

FNB Stadium, Johannesburg (South Africa)
Referee: Patrice Tanguy Mebiame (Gabon)
11 June 2024
17:00 UTC+1

Chad	0–2	Comoros
	Report	Maolida 59'; Ben 76'

Honor Stadium, Oujda (Morocco)
Attendance: 400
Referee: Adalbert Diouf (Senegal)

19 March 2025
17:00 UTC+1

Central African Republic	1–4	Madagascar
Gambor 9'	Report	Raveloson 17', 21'; Randrianantenaina 49'; Rafanomezantsoa 89'

Larbi Zaouli Stadium, Casablanca (Morocco)
Attendance: 300
Referee: Adalbert Diouf (Senegal)
20 March 2025
22:00 UTC+1

Comoros	0–3	Mali
	Report	Nene 20'; K. Doumbia 55', 63'

Berkane Municipal Stadium, Berkane (Morocco)
Referee: Mahmood Ali Mahmood Ismail (Sudan)
21 March 2025
19:00 UTC+0

Ghana	5–0	Chad
Semenyo 2'; Williams 31'; J. Ayew 36' (pen.); Salisu 56'; Nuamah 68'	Report

Accra Sports Stadium, Accra
Referee: Ahmed Abdulrazg (Libya)

24 March 2025
17:00 UTC+1

Central African Republic	0–0	Mali
	Report

Larbi Zaouli Stadium, Casablanca (Morocco)
Attendance: 1,600
Referee: Godfrey Nkhakananga (Malawi)
24 March 2025
20:00 UTC+1

Madagascar	0–3	Ghana
	Report	Partey 11', 53'; Kudus 58'

Grand Stade d'Al Hoceima, Al Hoceima (Morocco)
Referee: Issa Sy (Senegal)
25 March 2025
22:00 UTC+1

Comoros	1–0	Chad
Saïd 24'	Report

Berkane Municipal Stadium, Berkane (Morocco)
Referee: Akaté Gnama (Togo)

4 September 2025
14:00 UTC+1

Chad	1–1	Ghana
Ecua 89'	Report	J. Ayew 17'

Stade Olympique Maréchal Idriss Déby Itno, N'Djamena
Referee: Celso Alvação (Mozambique)
4 September 2025
17:00 UTC+1

Madagascar	2–0	Central African Republic
Caddy 45+2'; Randrianantenaina 59'	Report

Larbi Zaouli Stadium, Casablanca (Morocco)
Attendance: 450
Referee: Ahmed Arajiga (Tanzania)
4 September 2025
19:00 UTC+0

Mali	3–0	Comoros
Nene 28'; K. Doumbia 70' (pen.); Coulibaly 76'	Report

Berkane Municipal Stadium, Berkane (Morocco)
Referee: Jalal Jayed (Morocco)

7 September 2025
17:00 UTC+1

Central African Republic	0–2	Comoros
	Report	M'Changama 20'; Maolida 39'

Meknes Honor Stadium, Meknes (Morocco)
Attendance: 300
Referee: Naim Hosni (Tunisia)
8 September 2025
17:00 UTC+1

Madagascar	3–1	Chad
Caddy 52'; Raveloson 69'; Abdallah 90+3'	Report	Allarabaye 25'

Larbi Zaouli Stadium, Casablanca (Morocco)
Attendance: 1,200
Referee: Fabricio Duarte (Cape Verde)
8 September 2025
19:00 UTC+0

Ghana	1–0	Mali
Djiku 49'	Report

Accra Sports Stadium, Accra
Referee: Luxolo Badi (South Africa)

8 October 2025
17:00 UTC+1

Chad	0–2	Mali
	Report	K. Doumbia 19', 74'

Stade Olympique Maréchal Idriss Déby Itno, N'Djamena
Referee: Lebalang Mokete (Lesotho)
8 October 2025
17:00 UTC+1

Central African Republic	0–5	Ghana
	Report	Salisu 20'; Partey 52'; Djiku 69'; J. Ayew 71'; K. Sulemana 87'

Ben M'Hamed El Abdi Stadium, El Jadida (Morocco)
Attendance: 200
Referee: Patrice Milazare (Mauritius)
8 October 2025
16:00 UTC+0

Comoros	1–2	Madagascar
Saïd 81'	Report	Couturier 11'; Raheriniaina 73'

Felix Houphouet Boigny Stadium, Abidjan (Ivory Coast)
Attendance: 567
Referee: Samir Guezzaz (Morocco)

12 October 2025
17:00 UTC+1

Chad	2–3	Central African Republic
Ecua 53'; Mouandilmadji 87'	Report	Mokonou 3'; Baboula 31'; Namnganda 90+3'

Stade Olympique Maréchal Idriss Déby Itno, N'Djamena
Referee: Celso Alvação (Mozambique)
12 October 2025
19:00 UTC+0

Ghana	1–0	Comoros
Kudus 47'	Report

Accra Sports Stadium, Accra
Attendance: 38,000
Referee: Pierre Atcho (Gabon)
12 October 2025
19:00 UTC+0

Mali	4–1	Madagascar
Sinayoko 10', 64'; Nene 39'; G. Diarra 90+5'	Report	N'Zi 90'

Stade du 26 Mars, Bamako
Attendance: 3,000
Referee: Georges Gatogato (Burundi)

== Goalscorers ==
There were 85 goals scored in 30 matches, for an average of 2.83 goals per match.

8 goals

- (Mali national football team) Kamory Doumbia

7 goals

- (Ghana national football team) Jordan Ayew

5 goals

- (Madagascar national football team) Rayan Raveloson

4 goals

- (Comoros national football team) Myziane Maolida

3 goals

- (Central African Republic national football team) Louis Mafouta
- (Comoros national football team) Rafiki Saïd
- (Ghana national football team) Thomas Partey
- (Mali national football team) Dorgeles Nene

2 goals

- (Central African Republic national football team) Vénuste Baboula
- (Chad national football team) Célestin Ecua
- (Chad national football team) Marius Mouandilmadji
- (Comoros national football team) El Fardou Ben Nabouhane
- (Ghana national football team) Alexander Djiku
- (Ghana national football team) Mohammed Kudus
- (Ghana national football team) Ernest Nuamah
- (Ghana national football team) Mohammed Salisu
- (Ghana national football team) Iñaki Williams
- (Madagascar national football team) Warren Caddy
- (Madagascar national football team) Njiva Rakotoharimalala
- (Madagascar national football team) Arnaud Randrianantenaina
- (Mali national football team) Lassine Sinayoko

1 goal

- (Central African Republic national football team) Hugo Gambor
- (Central African Republic national football team) Geoffrey Kondogbia
- (Central African Republic national football team) Delphin Mokonou
- (Central African Republic national football team) Karl Namnganda
- (Chad national football team) Yves Allarabaye
- (Comoros national football team) Youssouf M'Changama
- (Comoros national football team) Kassim M'Dahoma
- (Comoros national football team) Benjaloud Youssouf
- (Ghana national football team) Abdul Fatawu
- (Ghana national football team) Antoine Semenyo
- (Ghana national football team) Kamaldeen Sulemana
- (Madagascar national football team) Hakim Abdallah
- (Madagascar national football team) Clément Couturier
- (Madagascar national football team) Loïc Lapoussin
- (Madagascar national football team) Johan N'Zi
- (Madagascar national football team) Lalaïna Rafanomezantsoa
- (Madagascar national football team) El Hadary Raheriniaina
- (Mali national football team) Lassana Coulibaly
- (Mali national football team) Gaoussou Diarra
- (Mali national football team) Youssoufou Niakaté
- (Mali national football team) Ibrahima Sissoko

1 own goal

- (Comoros national football team) Abdel-Hakim Abdallah (against Central African Republic)
- (Comoros national football team) Younn Zahary (against Central African Republic)

== Discipline ==
A player was automatically suspended for the next match for the following infractions:

- Receiving a red card (red card suspensions could be extended for serious infractions)
- Receiving two yellow cards in two different matches (yellow card suspensions were carried forward to further qualification rounds, but not the finals or any other future international matches)

The following suspensions were served during the group stage:

Team	Player	Infraction(s)	Suspended for match(es)
Central African Republic	Louis Mafouta	(yellow card) vs Ghana (10 June 2024); (yellow card) vs Mali (24 March 2025)	vs Madagascar (4 September 2025)
Central African Republic	Karl Namnganda	(yellow card) vs Comoros (17 November 2023); (yellow card) vs Ghana (10 June 2024)	vs Madagascar (19 March 2025)
Central African Republic	Brad Pirioua	(yellow card) vs Mali (20 November 2023); (yellow card) vs Ghana (10 June 2024)	vs Madagascar (19 March 2025)
Comoros	Kassim M'Dahoma	(yellow card) vs Madagascar (7 June 2024); (yellow card) vs Mali (20 March 2025)	vs Chad (25 March 2025)
Ghana	Elisha Owusu	(yellow card) vs Mali (6 June 2024); (yellow card) vs Chad (4 September 2025)	vs Mali (8 September 2025)
Madagascar	Ibrahim Amada	(yellow card) vs Comoros (7 June 2024); (yellow card) vs Mali (11 June 2024)	vs Central African Republic (19 March 2025)
Madagascar	Louis Démoléon	(red card) vs Mali (11 June 2024)	vs Central African Republic (19 March 2025)
Madagascar	Radoniaina Rabemanantsoa	(yellow card) vs Comoros (7 June 2024); (yellow card) vs Central African Republic (19 March 2025)	vs Ghana (24 March 2025)
