= Raux =

Raux is a surname. Notable people with the surname include:

- Auguste Raux (born 1954), French football coach
- Corinne Raux (born 1976), French duathlete
- Damien Raux (born 1984), French ice hockey player
- KickRaux, Jamaican DJ, record producer, songwriter and music executive

== See also ==
- Rauf
