= Geordan Dupire =

Malgasy footballer (born 1993)

Personal information
- Date of birth: 28 September 1993 (age 33)
- Place of birth: Valenciennes, France
- Height: 1.93 m (6 ft 4 in)
- Position: Goalkeeper

Team information
- Current team: Swift Hesperange
- Number: 40

Senior career*
Years	Team	Apps	(Gls)
2010–2012	Lorient II	20	(0)
2010–2012	Lorient	0	(0)
2012–2014	RAEC Mons	0	(0)
2014–2015	UR Namur		
2015–2016	Boulogne II	13	(0)
2015–2016	Boulogne	0	(0)
2016–2021	Virton	68	(0)
2021	Hostert	16	(0)
2021–	Swift Hesperange	132	(0)

International career^{‡}
2025–	Madagascar	6	(0)
- * Club domestic league appearances and goals as of 13 June 2026 ‡ National team caps and goals as of 20 October 2025

Geordan Dupire (born 28 September 1993) is a footballer who plays as a goalkeeper for Luxembourg National Division club Swift Hesperange. Born in France, he plays for the Madagascar national team.

== Career ==
=== Virton ===
Dupire joined Belgian club R.E. Virton in July 2016. He made his league debut for the club on 3 September 2016 in a 3–0 away victory over Geel. On 10 October 2018, Dupire signed a new three-year contract with the club.

== International career ==
Born in France, Dupire gained Malagasy citizenship through his wife; she holds dual-citizenship and is of Malagasy and Moroccan descent. He was called up to the Madagascar national team for a set of 2026 FIFA World Cup qualification matches in March 2025.

Dupire made his debut on 19 March 2025 in a World Cup qualifier against the Central African Republic national team.
