= Gambia national football team =

Gambia
- Nickname: The Scorpions
- Association: Gambia Football Federation (GFF)
- Confederation: CAF (Africa)
- Sub-confederation: WAFU (West Africa)
- Head coach: Johnny McKinstry
- Captain: Omar Colley
- Most caps: Omar Colley (69)
- Top scorer: Musa Barrow (16)
- Home stadium: Independence Stadium
- FIFA code: GAM
First colours	Second colours

FIFA ranking
- Current: 107 ▲2 (18 November 2026)
- Highest: 65 (June 2009)
- Lowest: 179 (March 2017)

First international
- British Gambia 2–1 Sierra Leone (Gambia; 9 February 1953)

Biggest win
- Seychelles 0–7 Gambia (Saint-Pierre, Mauritius; 14 October 2025)

Biggest defeat
- Guinea 8–0 Gambia (Guinea; 14 May 1972)

Africa Cup of Nations
- Appearances: 2 (first in 2021)
- Best result: Quarter-finals (2021)

The Gambia national football team (recognized as The Gambia by FIFA) represents The Gambia in men's international football and is controlled by the Gambia Football Federation. Until 1965, the team and the country were known as British Gambia. The team represents both FIFA and Confederation of African Football (CAF).

== History ==
Under the name British Gambia, the team played their first ever game on 9 February 1953 against Sierra Leone, winning 2–1 at home in a friendly. In April 1963, the team entered the L'Amitié tournament in Senegal, a competition mainly for French-speaking nations. They were drawn in a group with France's amateur team, the Upper Volta (now Burkina Faso) and Gabon. Their first match was lost 5–1 to the French amateurs on 11 April. The Gambia drew 2–2 with the Upper Volta on 13 April, and had the same result the very next day versus Gabon. The Gambia did not advance to the next round.

After the tournament in Senegal, the Gambia did not play another match until 16 November 1968, when they travelled to Sierra Leone to play its team in a friendly and lost 2–1. They played again in Sierra Leone in The Gambia's next match on 24 April 1971, and the hosts won 3–1. On 2 May 1971, The Gambia travelled to Guinea for a friendly and lost 4–2. On 14 May 1972, The Gambia returned to Guinea for their first African Games qualifier and lost 8–0 and were knocked out.

In 1975, the Gambia entered its first qualification campaign for the 1976 Summer Olympics in Canada. They were drawn in a qualifier against Guinea, and lost the first leg 1–0 at home on 27 April 1975. The second leg was lost 6–0 in Guinea on 1 June as Guinea advanced 7–0 on aggregate.

In August of that same year, the Gambia entered their first qualification for the African Cup of Nations, with the aim of reaching the 1976 finals in Ethiopia. They were drawn in a two-legged qualifier against Morocco and lost the first leg 3–0 away on 10 August. They lost by the same score in their home leg on 24 August and Morocco advanced 6–0 on aggregate.

After the qualification campaign for the 1976 finals, The Gambia played their first match against a full European side, losing a home friendly 4–1 to Denmark on 30 January 1977.

On 13 October 2002, the team got their biggest ever victory in international competition, a 6–0 victory against Lesotho.

In May 2014, the Gambia was banned from all CAF competitions for two years after deliberately falsifying players' ages.

The nation's fortunes improved in qualification for the 2019 Africa Cup of Nations. Although they failed to qualify, they took it to the final round of games, including drawing twice with African giants Algeria.

On 13 November, in their first Group D match of 2021 Africa Cup of Nations qualification, Gambia defeated Angola 1–3 in Luanda. This was the Scorpions' first away win in an AFCON or FIFA World Cup qualifier ever, at their 40th attempt. An impressive campaign saw them qualify for their first ever major tournament that year. As the lowest-ranked team in the 2021 Africa Cup of Nations, the Gambia defied the odds by defeating favourites Tunisia in the group stage, finishing unbeaten in 2nd place in the group. A further win against Guinea in the Round of 16 saw them reach the quarter-finals at their first attempt, eventually going out to tournament hosts Cameroon.

== Home stadium ==
The Independence Stadium is a multi-purpose stadium in Bakau, Gambia. It is currently used mostly for football matches, although it is also used for music concerts, political events, trade fairs and national celebrations. The stadium holds 30,000 people.

== Results and fixtures ==
The following is a list of match results in the last 12 months, as well as any future matches that have been scheduled.

Win Draw Loss Fixture

=== 2026 ===
31 March Friendly	Senegal	3–1	Gambia	Dakar, Senegal
19:00 UTC+0	Seck 45+4'; Mbaye 47'; Camara 90+5'	Report	O. Colley 51'	Stadium: Diamniadio Olympic Stadium; Referee: Abdelaziz Bouh (Mauritania)

29 May Friendly	Iran	3–1	Gambia	Antalya, Turkey
14:00	Yousefi 47'; Rezaeian 59'; Taremi 68'	Report	O. Colley 42'	Stadium: Mardan Sports Complex; Referee: Atilla Karaoğlan (Turkey)

25 September 2027 AFCON Qualifiers	Gambia	2–1	Somalia	Bakau, Gambia
16:00 UTC+0	Colley 18' (pen.); Badamosi 83'	Report	Njie 72'	Stadium: Independence Stadium; Referee: Andofetra Rakotojaona (Madagascar)

29 September 2027 AFCON Qualifiers	Ghana	2–4	Gambia	Accra, Ghana
16:00 UTC+0	Nuamah 27' (pen.); Afena-Gyan 33'	Report	Badamosi 37' (pen.); Colley 42'; Colley 68', 90+1'	Stadium: Accra Sports Stadium; Referee: Kech Chaf Mustapha (Morocco)

4 October Friendly	Bolivia	Cancelled	Gambia	Santa Cruz, Bolivia
18:30 UTC−4		Report		Stadium: Estadio Ramón Tahuichi Aguilera
Note: The match was cancelled due to Gambia withdrawing by unknown reasons.

12 November 2027 AFCON Qualifiers	Ivory Coast	2–1	Gambia	Bouaké, Ivory Coast
19:00 UTC+0	Yalcouyé 17'; Wahi 24'	Report	Barrow 38'	Stadium: Bouaké Stadium; Referee: Abdou Abdel Mefire (Cameroon)

17 November 2027 AFCON Qualifiers	Gambia	2–2	Ivory Coast	Bakau, Gambia
16:00 UTC+0	Minteh 69'; Barrow 80' (pen.)	Report	Zogbé 13'; Inao Oulaï 90+8'	Stadium: Independence Stadium; Referee: Mehrez Melki (Tunisia)

=== 2027 ===
24 March 2027 AFCON Qualifiers	Somalia	v	Gambia	TBD, Somalia
TBD				Stadium: TBD

28 March 2027 AFCON Qualifiers	Gambia	v	Ghana	TBD, Gambia
TBD				Stadium: TBD

== Coaching staff ==
Position	Name
Head Coach	(Northern Ireland) Johnny McKinstry
Assistant Coach	(The Gambia) Abdou Jammeh
Goalkeeping Coach	(The Gambia) Alhagie Marong
Fitness/Performance Coach	(Kenya) Mikael Igendia
Match Analyst	(Republic of Ireland) Milad Samadi
Doctors	(The Gambia) Landing Jarju
Physiotherapists	Brendan Culhane,Richard Rees Evans,Abdoulie Ann
Team Coordinator	(The Gambia) Ousman Drammeh
Technical Director	(The Gambia) Sang Ndong

=== Coaching history ===
- (The Gambia) Ousmane Saho (1961)
- (The Gambia) Abdoulie Ngum and Moses Trinn (1970–1971)
- (The Gambia) Kebba Njie (1977)
- (The Gambia) Cherno Touray (1975–1978)
- (The Gambia) Mass Axi Gai (1978)
- (The Gambia) Kabba Jallow (1978–1983)
- (The Gambia) Saihou Sarr (1983)
- (Germany) Holger Obermann (1985)
- (Switzerland) Hans Heiniger (1987–1992)
- (The Gambia) Sang Ndong (1992–1994)
- (The Gambia) Sang Ndong (1994–2003)
- (Germany) Antoine Hey (2006–2007)
- (Spain) José Martínez (2007–2008)
- (Belgium) Paul Put (2008–2011)
- (The Gambia) Peter Bonu Johnson (2011–2012)
- (Italy) Luciano Mancini (2012–2013)
- (The Gambia) Peter Bonu Johnson (2013–2015)
- (Spain) (Switzerland) Raoul Savoy (2015)
- (The Gambia) Sang Ndong (2016–2018)
- (Belgium) Tom Saintfiet (2018–2024)
- (Northern Ireland) Johnny McKinstry (2024–)

== Players ==
=== Current squad ===
The following players have been pre-selected up for the 2027 Africa Cup of Nations qualification matches against Ivory Coast on November 2026.

Caps and goals correct as of 17 November 2026, after the second match against Ivory Coast.

No.	Pos.	Player	Date of birth (age)	Caps	Goals	Club
	GK	Baboucarr Gaye	24 February 1998 (age 28)	31	0	(Football Federation of Macedonia) Shkëndija
	GK	Ebrima Jarju	16 March 1998 (age 28)	10	0	(Estonian Football Association) Paide
	GK	Sheikh Sibi	21 February 1998 (age 28)	6	0	(Italian Football Federation) Virtus Verona
	DF	Omar Colley (captain)	24 October 1992 (age 34)	66	3	(Saudi Arabian Football Federation) Al-Diriyah
	DF	Ibou Touray	24 December 1994 (age 31)	30	0	(The Football Association) Bradford
	DF	James Gomez	14 November 2001 (age 25)	26	1	(Danish Football Association) Odense
	DF	Joseph Ceesay	3 June 1998 (age 28)	14	0	(Italian Football Federation) Empoli
	DF	Sainey Sanyang	18 April 2003 (age 23)	13	0	(Bulgarian Football Union) CSKA Sofia
	DF	Sheriff Sinyan	19 July 1996 (age 30)	13	1	(Romanian Football Federation) CFR Cluj
	DF	Alagie Saine	20 January 2003 (age 23)	12	0	(Danish Football Association) Horsens
	DF	Yaya Bojang	10 September 2004 (age 22)	6	0	(Danish Football Association) Odense
	DF	Tijan Sonha	31 July 2001 (age 25)	2	0	(Bulgarian Football Union) Beroe Stara Zagora
	DF	Joseph Colley	13 April 1999 (age 27)	0	0	(Albanian Football Federation) KF Tirana
	MF	Ebou Adams	15 January 1996 (age 30)	34	2	(The Football Association) Derby County
	MF	Alasana Manneh	8 April 1998 (age 28)	21	1	(Scottish Football Association) Hibernian
	MF	Mahmudu Bajo	15 August 2004 (age 22)	15	0	(Football Association of Serbia) Red Star Belgrade
	MF	Abubakr Barry	2 July 2000 (age 26)	12	0	(Austrian Football Association) Austria Wien
	MF	Jesper Ceesay	4 March 2003 (age 23)	4	0	(Swedish Football Association) IFK Norrköping
	MF	Karamba Gassama	2 January 2005 (age 21)	3	0	(Turkish Football Federation) Gaziantep
	MF	Saidou Khan	5 December 1995 (age 30)	1	0	(Tunisian Football Federation) Club Africain
	FW	Musa Barrow	14 November 1998 (age 28)	56	16	(Saudi Arabian Football Federation) Al Taawoun
	FW	Ebrima Colley	1 February 2000 (age 26)	33	5	(Swiss Football Association) Young Boys
	FW	Muhammed Badamosi	27 December 1998 (age 27)	29	6	(Latvian Football Federation) Riga FC
	FW	Abdoulie Sanyang	8 May 1999 (age 27)	26	0	(Croatian Football Federation) Hajduk Split
	FW	Yankuba Minteh	22 July 2004 (age 22)	22	8	(The Football Association) Brighton & Hove Albion
	FW	Abdoulie Ceesay	5 January 2004 (age 22)	11	3	(German Football Association) FC St. Pauli
	FW	Adama Sidibeh	25 June 1998 (age 28)	10	7	(Scottish Football Association) St Johnstone
	FW	Adama Bojang	28 May 2004 (age 22)	7	0	(French Football Federation) Reims
	FW	Abdoulie Manneh	29 September 2004 (age 22)	6	3	(Swedish Football Association) Mjällby
	FW	Suleiman Camara	7 December 2001 (age 24)	4	0	(Royal Spanish Football Federation) Racing de Santander
	FW	Salieu Drammeh	28 March 2003 (age 23)	1	0	(Norwegian Football Federation) Lillestrøm

=== Recent call-ups ===
The following players have also been called up to the Gambia squad within the last twelve months.

Pos.	Player	Date of birth (age)	Caps	Goals	Club	Latest call-up
DF	Abubacarr Sedi Kinteh	30 November 2006 (age 19)	1	0	(Norway) Tromsø	v. Iran, 29 May 2026
DF	Elvin Mendy	23 December 2006 (age 19)	1	0	(Turkey) İstanbulspor	v. Iran, 29 May 2026
MF	Mouhamadou Drammeh	15 May 1999 (age 27)	8	0	(Romania) Universitatea Cluj	v. Ghana, 29 September 2026
FW	Alieu Fadera	3 November 2001 (age 25)	18	1	(Italy) Cagliari	v. Ivory Coast, 12 November 2026 ^{PRE}
FW	Alasana Yirajang	12 November 2004 (age 22)	0	0	(Slovakia) Slovan Bratislava	v. Ghana, 29 September 2026
FW	Youssoupha Sanyang	31 August 2005 (age 21)	2	0	(Sweden) Öster	v. Senegal, 31 March 2026
^{WD} Player withdrew from the squad due to non-injury issue.^{INJ} Player withdrew from the squad due to an injury.^{PRE} Preliminary squad.^{RET} Player has retired from international football.^{SUS} Suspended from the national team.

== Player records ==
As of 14 October 2025
Players in bold are still active with Gambia.

=== Most appearances ===
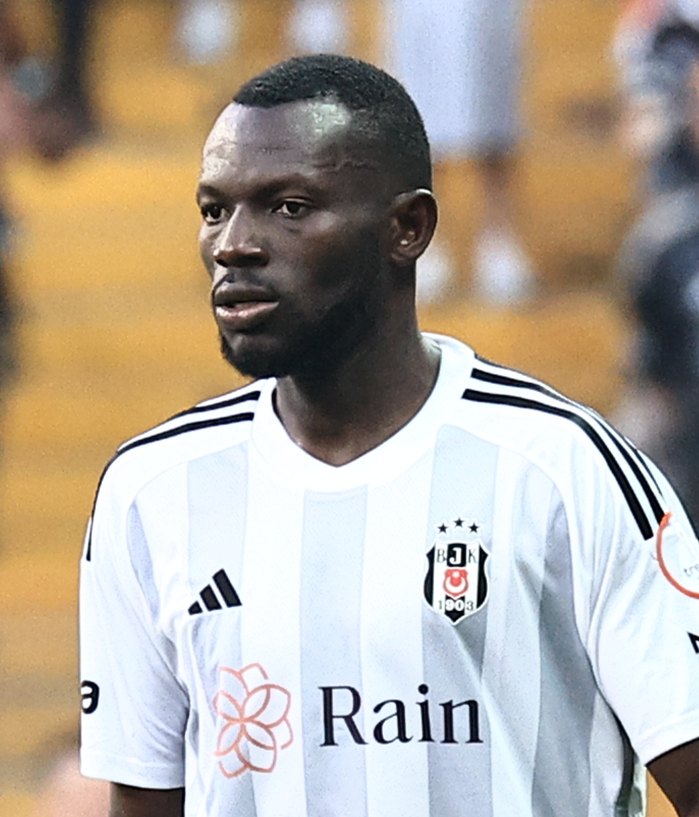
Omar Colley is Gambia's most capped player with 62 appearances.

Rank	Player	Caps	Goals	Career
1	**Omar Colley**	62	1	2012–present
2	**Musa Barrow**	52	14	2018–present
3	Pa Modou Jagne	43	2	2006–2022
4	**Assan Ceesay**	41	13	2013–present
5	**Bubacarr Sanneh**	40	1	2012–present
6	**Ablie Jallow**	38	8	2015–present
6	Ebrima Sohna	38	3	2007–2022
8	**Sulayman Marreh**	35	1	2011–present
9	Abdou Jammeh	33	2	2006–2015
10	**Modou Jobe**	31	0	2007–present

=== Top goalscorers ===
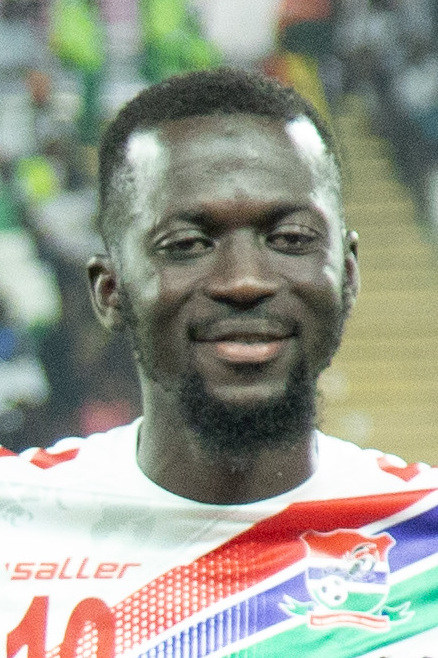
Musa Barrow is Gambia's top goalscorer with 14 goals.

Rank	Player	Goals	Caps	Ratio	Career
1	**Musa Barrow**	14	52	0.27	2018–present
2	**Assan Ceesay**	13	41	0.32	2013–present
3	**Ablie Jallow**	8	38	0.21	2015–present
4	**Adama Sidibeh**	7	9	0.78	2024–present
4	**Yankuba Minteh**	7	19	0.37	2022–present
6	Momoudou Ceesay	6	16	0.38	2010–2015
7	Omar Samba	5	12	0.42	1994–2002
7	Jatto Ceesay	5	17	0.29	1994–2007
7	Mustapha Jarju	5	26	0.19	2006–2013
10	**Muhammed Badamosi**	4	26	0.15	2018–present

== Competitive record ==
=== FIFA World Cup ===
FIFA World Cup record									Qualification record					
Year	Round	Position	Pld	W	D*	L	GF	GA	Pld	W	D	L	GF	GA
1930 to 1950	Part of United Kingdom								Part of United Kingdom					
1954 to 1966	Not a FIFA member								Not a FIFA member					
1970 to 1978	Did not enter								Did not enter					
(Spain) 1982	Did not qualify								2	0	1	1	1	2
(Mexico) 1986	Did not qualify								2	1	0	1	3	6
(Italy) 1990	Did not enter								Did not enter					
(United States) 1994	Withdrew								Withdrew					
(France) 1998	Did not qualify								2	1	0	1	2	5
(South Korea) (Japan) 2002	Did not qualify								2	0	0	2	0	3
(Germany) 2006	Did not qualify								2	1	0	1	2	3
(South Africa) 2010	Did not qualify								6	2	3	1	6	3
(Brazil) 2014	Did not qualify								6	1	1	4	4	11
(Russia) 2018	Did not qualify								2	0	1	1	2	3
(Qatar) 2022	Did not qualify								2	0	0	2	1	3
(Canada) (Mexico) (United States) 2026	Did not qualify								10	4	1	5	27	18
(Morocco) (Portugal) (Spain) 2030	To be determined								To be determined					
(Saudi Arabia) 2034	To be determined								To be determined					
Total	–	0/14	–	–	–	–	–	–	36	10	7	19	48	57

=== Africa Cup of Nations ===
Africa Cup of Nations record
Year	Round	Position	Pld	W	D*	L	GF	GA
(Sudan) 1957 to (Ghana) 1963	Part of United Kingdom							
(Tunisia) 1965	Not affiliated to CAF							
(Ethiopia) 1968 to (Egypt) 1974	Did not enter							
(Ethiopia) 1976	Did not qualify							
(Ghana) 1978	Did not enter							
(Nigeria) 1980 to (Morocco) 1988	Did not qualify							
(Algeria) 1990	Withdrew							
(Senegal) 1992	Did not qualify							
(Tunisia) 1994	Did not enter							
(South Africa) 1996	Withdrew during qualifying							
(Burkina Faso) 1998	Banned for withdrawing in 1996							
(Ghana) (Nigeria) 2000	Withdrew							
(Mali) 2002 to (South Africa) 2013	Did not qualify							
(Equatorial Guinea) 2015	Banned							
(Gabon) 2017	Did not qualify							
(Egypt) 2019	Did not qualify							
(Cameroon) 2021	Quarter-finals	6th	5	3	1	1	4	3
(Ivory Coast) 2023	Group stage	23rd	3	0	0	3	2	7
(Morocco) 2025	Did not qualify							
(Kenya) (Tanzania) (Uganda) 2027	To be determined							
2029	To be determined							
Total	Quarter-finals	2/35	8	3	1	4	6	10

== Head-to-head record ==
As of match played 29 September 2026 after the match against Ghana

Opponent	Pld	W	D	L	GF	GA	GD	W%
Algeria	10	2	3	5	7	14	−7	20.00
Angola	5	2	1	2	6	5	+1	40.00
Benin	2	1	0	1	3	2	+1	50.00
Burkina Faso	5	1	3	1	4	5	−1	20.00
Burundi	2	1	0	1	4	3	+1	50.00
Cameroon	4	0	0	4	2	8	−6	0.00
Cape Verde	9	4	3	2	13	7	+6	44.44
Central African Republic	2	1	1	0	3	2	+1	50.00
Chad	2	1	1	0	3	2	+1	50.00
China	1	0	0	1	2	4	−2	0.00
Comoros	2	0	1	1	2	3	−1	0.00
Congo	5	1	3	1	5	5	+0	20.00
DR Congo	3	1	1	1	5	3	+2	33.33
Denmark	1	0	0	1	1	4	−3	0.00
Djibouti	2	0	2	0	2	2	+0	0.00
Equatorial Guinea	2	1	0	1	2	2	+0	50.00
Gabon	8	2	3	3	11	12	−1	25.00
Ghana	9	2	1	6	10	18	−8	22.22
Guinea	25	8	12	5	22	32	−10	32.00
Guinea-Bissau	12	4	2	6	12	13	−1	33.33
Iran	1	0	0	1	1	3	−2	0.00
Ivory Coast	8	2	0	6	5	21	−16	25.00
Kenya	2	1	1	0	6	4	+2	50.00
Kosovo	1	0	0	1	0	1	−1	0.00
Lesotho	2	1	0	1	6	1	+5	50.00
Liberia	10	3	3	4	11	14	−3	30.00
Libya	2	0	1	1	1	2	−1	0.00
Luxembourg	1	0	0	1	1	2	−1	0.00
Madagascar	2	1	1	0	2	1	+1	50.00
Mali	21	7	5	9	16	26	−10	33.33
Mauritania	21	8	8	5	26	20	+6	38.10
Mexico	1	0	0	1	0	5	−5	0.00
Morocco	8	1	1	6	2	14	−12	12.50
Namibia	4	1	1	2	5	5	+0	25.00
New Zealand	1	0	0	1	0	2	−2	0.00
Niger	2	1	1	0	3	1	+2	50.00
Nigeria	1	0	0	1	0	1	−1	0.00
Saudi Arabia	1	0	0	1	0	3	−3	0.00
Senegal	27	0	11	16	11	40	−29	0.00
Seychelles	2	2	0	0	12	1	+11	100.00
Sierra Leone	20	5	6	9	15	23	−8	25.00
Somalia	1	1	0	0	2	1	+1	100.00
South Africa	3	0	2	1	2	6	−4	0.00
South Sudan	3	3	0	0	6	3	+3	100.00
Tanzania	2	1	0	1	3	2	+1	50.00
Togo	6	2	2	2	5	6	−1	33.33
Tunisia	4	3	0	1	5	3	+2	75.00
Uganda	2	0	2	0	2	2	+0	0.00
United Arab Emirates	1	0	1	0	1	1	+0	0.00
Zambia	1	0	0	1	0	2	−2	0.00
Total	272	75	83	114	262	362	−100	27.57

== Honours ==
=== Regional ===
- Amilcar Cabral Cup
  - (silver) Runners-up (3): 1980, 1985, 2001
  - (bronze) Third place (1): 1993
