= Luciano Mancini =

Italian football manager

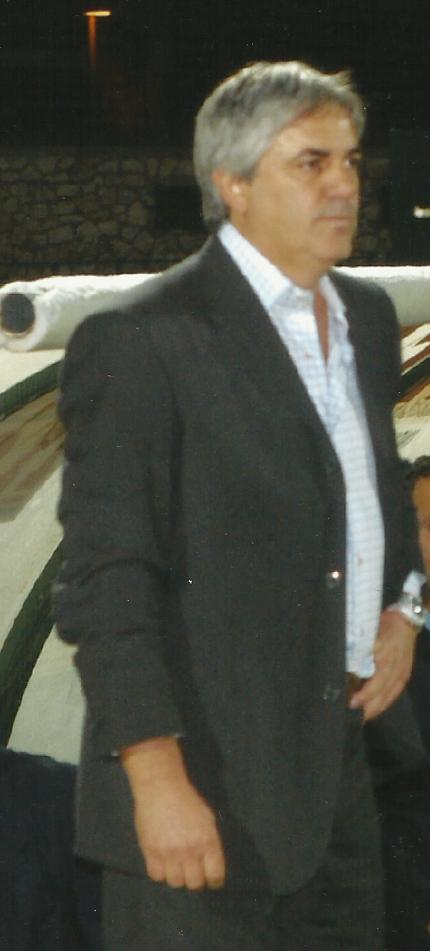

Personal information
- Date of birth: 4 April 1953 (age 73)
- Place of birth: Perugia, Italy

Team information
- Current team: Perugia Women (manager)

Managerial career
- Years: Team
- 2003–2004: Grosseto (joint)
- 2004–2005: Todi
- 2005–2006: Città di Castello
- 2006–2007: Umbertide
- 2007–2008: Torgiano
- 2009: Nocera Umbra
- 2009–2010: Villabiagio
- 2012–2013: Gambia
- 2016–2017: Assisi (joint)
- 2020–: Perugia (women)

Luciano Mancini (born 4 April 1953) is an Italian football coach who manages Perugia Women.

== Career ==
Mancini had a coaching career mostly in his native Umbria, as well as a short stint as joint head coach of Serie C2's Grosseto, together with Lamberto Magrini, during the 2003–04 season.

In 2007, after three experiences at amateur level with Todi, Città di Castello and Umbertide, he was hired in charge of Torgiano. In March 2009 he was hired as new head coach of Promozione amateurs Nocera Umbra. He was successively appointed in charge of Villabiagio, another Promozione Umbria team, for the 2009–10 season; this was followed by him being named new coach of the Umbria amateur representative team in 2010.

Mancini was assistant manager of the Gambian national team until May 2012, when he was promoted to manager; he replaced Peter Bonu Johnson, who was demoted to assistant manager.

In August 2015 he joined Siena as a technical collaborator. He moved to Udinese as a technical collaborator soon thereafter, and successively was appointed as joint head coach of Umbria amateurs Assisi in November 2016.

On 28 August 2020 he was named new head coach of Perugia Women, and Perugia Calcio's under-19s.
