= Karl Namnganda =

Central African footballer

Personal information
- Full name: Karl Maxence Aristophane Namnganda
- Date of birth: 8 February 1996 (age 30)
- Place of birth: Bangui, Central African Republic
- Height: 1.74 m (5 ft 9 in)
- Position: Winger

Senior career*
| Years | Team | Apps | (Gls) |
| 2019 | Cholet | 1 | (0) |
| 2019–2021 | AC Pouzauges | 17 | (5) |
| 2021–2022 | Les Herbiers | 24 | (2) |
| 2022–2023 | AC Pouzauges | 4 | (0) |
| 2023 | La Roche | 9 | (0) |
| 2023–2024 | Neptūnas | 12 | (5) |
| 2024 | Karbala | | |
| 2024–2025 | Pirin Blagoevgrad | 12 | (2) |
| 2025 | Göçmenköy IYSK | 0 | (0) |

International career^{‡}
| 2021– | Central African Republic | 27 | (5) |
- * Club domestic league appearances and goals as of 17:21, 17 July 2025 (UTC) ‡ National team caps and goals as of 20:30, 12 October 2025 (UTC)

Karl Maxence Namnganda (born 8 February 1996) is a Central African professional footballer who plays as a forward for the Central African Republic national team.

== Career ==
Namnganda began his career with Évry, and moved to the reserves of Cholet in 2016. He worked his way into the squad in 2019, making an appearance in the Championnat National. He followed that up with a move to Pouzauges in 2019, and then to Les Herbiers in the summer of 2021.

== International career ==
Namnganda made his debut with the Central African Republic national team in a 1–0 2022 FIFA World Cup qualification loss to Liberia on 6 September 2021.

=== International goals ===
Scores and results list Central African Republic's goal tally first.

List of international goals scored by Karl Namnganda
| No. | Date | Venue | Opponent | Score | Result | Competition |
|---|---|---|---|---|---|---|
| 1. | 7 October 2021 | Teslim Balogun Stadium, Lagos, Nigeria | Nigeria | 1–0 | 1–0 | 2022 FIFA World Cup qualification |
| 2. | 5 June 2022 | Estádio 11 de Novembro, Talatona, Angola | Ghana | 1–1 | 1–1 | 2023 Africa Cup of Nations qualification |
| 3. | 22 March 2024 | Colombo Racecourse, Colombo, Sri Lanka | Bhutan | 3–0 | 6–0 | 2024 FIFA Series |
| 4. | 22 March 2024 | Colombo Racecourse, Colombo, Sri Lanka | Bhutan | 5–0 | 6–0 | 2024 FIFA Series |
| 5. | 12 October 2025 | Stade Olympique Maréchal Idriss Déby Itno, N'Djamena, Chad | Chad | 3–2 | 3–2 | 2026 FIFA World Cup qualification |
