= Sang Ndong =

Gambian footballer and manager

Personal information
- Date of birth: 8 August 1957 (age 69)
- Place of birth: Banjul, Gambia
- Position: Goalkeeper

Senior career*
Years	Team	Apps	(Gls)
- Augustinians
- Banjul Hawks

International career
1979–1984	Gambia		

Managerial career
- 1992–1994: Gambia
- 1994–2003: Gambia
- 2006–2016: Banjul Hawks
- 2016–2018: Gambia
- 2018–2024: Gambia (Technical Director)
- * Club domestic league appearances and goals

Sang Ndong (born 8 August 1957) is a Gambian football manager and former player. A goalkeeper, he was a player in the Gambia national team in 1984 and played at least two matches in the qualifying for 1986 FIFA World Cup.

== Playing career ==
Sang Ndong started playing from primary to secondary school where he represented the St. Augustine's High School team at various competitions. After graduation, he went straight to the second division playing for the Augustinians from where he transferred to Banjul Hawks and remained there until the end of his career. When he was first called up in national team, he was fifth choice keeper, but eventually became the number one and then captain of the national team.

== Managerial career ==
Sang Ndong was over ten years coach of the Gambia national team until he vacant by the Association, the Gambia Football Association was dismissed in 2003. The post remained vacant until mid-September 2006, when the German Antoine Hey was his successor.

As a coach of the Banjul Hawks he won the 2006 Gambian Cup.

Sang Ndong was first appointed as a co-coach with Alhagie Sillah in the late 90s but singlehandedly oversaw the country’s failed attempt to reach the 2004 African Cup of Nations.

He also served as a Technical Director of The Gambia Football Association.

He became manager of Gambia in February 2016.
