= Johan N'Zi =

Malagasy footballer (born 2003)

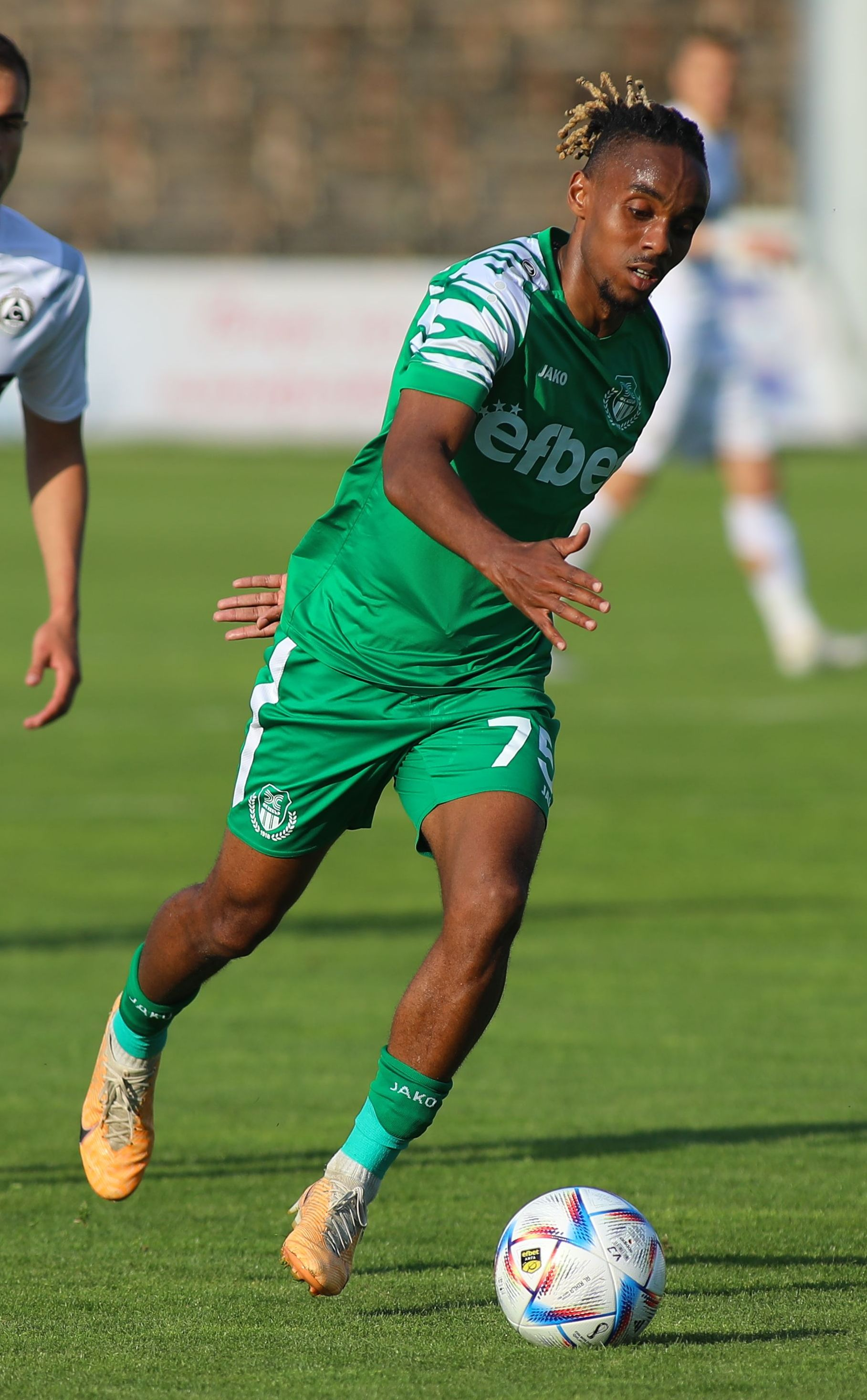
- N'Zi in 2024

Personal information
- Date of birth: 23 January 1995 (age 31)
- Place of birth: Paris, France
- Height: 1.80 m (5 ft 11 in)
- Position: Midfielder

Team information
- Current team: Bnei Sakhnin
- Number: 75

Youth career
- Strasbourg

Senior career*
Years	Team	Apps	(Gls)
2017–2019	Chambly II	8	(0)
2019–2020	Altglienicke	8	(0)
2020–2021	Vilaverdense	20	(2)
2022–2023	UR La Louvière Centre	16	(3)
2023	Sozopol	14	(1)
2023–2024	Spartak Varna	17	(3)
2024	Hebar	13	(0)
2024–2025	Lokomotiv Plovdiv	7	(0)
2025	Hebar	12	(0)
2025–	Bnei Sakhnin	11	(1)

International career^{‡}
2024–	Madagascar	12	(2)
- * Club domestic league appearances and goals as of 24 June 2026 ‡ National team caps and goals as of 23:00, 18 June 2026 (UTC)

Johan N'Zi (born 23 January 1995) is a professional footballer who plays as a midfielder for Israeli Premier League club Bnei Sakhnin. Born in France, he plays for the Madagascar national team.

== Club career ==
A youth product of the French club Strasbourg, N'Zi began his senior career with the reserves of Chambly in 2017 in the Championnat National 2. In 2019, he moved to the German Regionalliga club Altglienicke. The following season, he had a stint in the Campeonato de Portugal with Vilaverdense. The following season, he moved over to UR La Louvière Centre in the Belgian Division 2. In 2023 he moved to Bulgaria with Sozopol in the Second Professional Football League, followed by a move in Spartak Varna where he became captain. In 2024 he moved to Hebar, followed by a stint to Lokomotiv Plovdiv, before returning to Hebar on 5 March 2025.

== International career ==
Born in France, N'Zi is of Malagasy and Ivorian descent. In August 2024, he was called up to the Madagascar national team for a set of 2025 Africa Cup of Nations qualification matches.

=== International goals ===
Scores and results list Madagascar's goal tally first.

No.	Date	Venue	Opponent	Score	Result	Competition
1.	12 October 2025	Stade du 26 Mars, Bamako, Mali	Mali	1–3	1–4	2026 FIFA World Cup qualification
2.	17 November 2025	Arslan Zeki Demirci Sports Complex, Manavgat, Turkey	Equatorial Guinea	1–0	2–0	Friendly
