= Hans Heiniger =

Swiss football coach (born 1940 or 1941)

Personal information
- Date of birth: 1940 or 1941 (age 85–86)

Managerial career
- Years: Team
- 1987–1992: Gambia
- 2000: Djoliba AC
- 2002–2003: Madagascar

Hans Heiniger (born 1940 or 1941) is a Swiss football coach who has managed a number of teams in Africa.

== Career ==
Heiniger has coached in the Gambia, Tunisia, Burkina Faso, Mali and Madagascar.

He coached the Gambian national team between 1987 and 1992, their first ever foreign manager.

In Mali he managed Djoliba AC, leading them to 2nd place in the Malian Première Division, before being sacked in August 2000. In August 2002 he became the new manager of the Madagascar national side. He left the position in July 2003, and was replaced by Rodolphe Rakotoarisoa.
