= Ruphin Menakely =

Malagasy footballer (born 1975)

Personal information
- Date of birth: 15 November 1975 (age 50)
- Position: Forward

Senior career*
Years	Team	Apps	(Gls)
1996–2003	AS Excelsior		
2004–2005	AS Chaudron		
2006	Saint-Denis		
2007–2009	AS Excelsior		

International career
1998–2003	Madagascar	23	(11)
- * Club domestic league appearances and goals

Ruphin Menakely (born 15 September 1975) is a retired Malagasy professional footballer who played as a striker.

== International goals ==
List of international goals scored by Ruphin Menakely
No.	Date	Venue	Opponent	Score	Result	Competition
1.	11 August 1998	Stade Linite, Saint-Denis, Réunion	Seychelles	0–3	2–5	1998 Indian Ocean Island Games
2.	23 August 1998	Mahamasina Municipal Stadium, Antananarivo	Eswatini	1–0	1–1	2000 Africa Cup of Nations qualification
3.	03 October 1998	Moi International Sports Centre, Nairobi, Kenya	Kenya	1–1	1–1	2000 Africa Cup of Nations qualification
4.	28 February 1999	Mahamasina Municipal Stadium, Antananarivo	DR Congo	1–0	3–1	2000 Africa Cup of Nations qualification
5.	28 January 2001	Mahamasina Municipal Stadium, Antananarivo	Ivory Coast	1–2	1–3	2002 FIFA World Cup qualification
6.	24 March 2001	Mahamasina Municipal Stadium, Antananarivo	Namibia	1–2	1–2	2002 Africa Cup of Nations qualification
7.	07 September 2002	Mahamasina Municipal Stadium, Antananarivo	Egypt	1–0	1–0	2004 Africa Cup of Nations qualification
8.	12 October 2002	Stade Auguste Vollaire, Centre de Flacq	Mauritius	0–1	0–1	2004 Africa Cup of Nations qualification
9.	22 February 2003	Mahamasina Municipal Stadium, Antananarivo	Mauritius	1–0	2–1	2003 COSAFA Cup
10.	24 April 2003	Stade de la Licorne, Amiens	Algeria	3–1	3–1	Friendly
11.	28 August 2003	Stade George V, Curepipe, Mauritius	Seychelles	3–1	3–1	2003 Indian Ocean Island Games
