= Kassim M'Dahoma =

Footballer (born 1997)

Personal information
- Date of birth: 26 January 1997 (age 29)
- Place of birth: Marseille, France
- Height: 1.82 m (6 ft 0 in)
- Position: Defender

Youth career
- –2015: FC Côte Bleu
- 2015–2016: GS Consolat

Senior career*
Years	Team	Apps	(Gls)
2016–2018	GS Consolat	31	(2)
2018–2019	Boulogne	20	(1)
2019–2020	Bourg-en-Bresse	16	(1)
2020–2021	Sporting Club Lyon	17	(0)
2021–2022	Avranches	21	(1)
2022–2023	Botoșani	1	(0)
2023–2024	GOAL FC	22	(2)
2024–2026	Aubagne	44	(2)

International career^{‡}
2017–	Comoros	27	(1)
- * Club domestic league appearances and goals as of 23 June 2026 ‡ National team caps and goals as of 21 November 2023

Kassim M'Dahoma (born 26 January 1997) is a professional footballer who plays as a defender. Born in France, he plays for the Comoros national team.

== Club career ==
M'Dahoma spent one season with FC Côte Bleu before moving to the academy of GS Consolat in 2015.

He spent two seasons playing for the senior side in Championnat National, before joining divisional rivals US Boulogne in July 2018.

He went on to join Bourg-Péronnas in August 2019.

In September 2020 he moved clubs within the Championnat National again, signing for Sporting Club Lyon.

In August 2021, Avranches announced the signing of M'Dahoma.

On 7 October 2022, M'Dahoma agreed to a two-year deal at Romanian Liga I club Botoșani.

== International career ==
M'Dahoma made his international debut for the Comoros national team in a friendly 2–0 loss to Togo on 4 July 2017.

On 11 December 2025, M'Dahoma was called up to the Comoros squad for the 2025 Africa Cup of Nations.

=== International stats ===
As of match played 21 November 2023

Appearances and goals by national team and year
National team	Year	Apps	Goals
Comoros	2017	1	0
Comoros	2018	2	0
Comoros	2019	6	0
Comoros	2020	3	0
Comoros	2021	5	0
Comoros	2022	6	0
Comoros	2023	4	1
Total		27	1

=== International goals ===
Scores and results list the Comoros' goal tally first.

No.	Date	Venue	Opponent	Score	Result	Competition
1.	17 November 2023	Stade de Moroni, Moroni, Comoros	Central African Republic	1–1	4–2	2026 FIFA World Cup qualification
