= José Martínez (footballer, born 1942) =

Spanish footballer and manager

Personal information
- Full name: José María Martínez López
- Date of birth: 22 September 1942 (age 84)
- Place of birth: Larache, Morocco
- Position: Midfielder

Senior career*
| Years | Team | Apps | (Gls) |
| 1961–1962 | Real Zaragoza | 0 | (0) |
- ?
| 1968–1969 | Jerez Industrial CF | 20 | (1) |

Managerial career
- ?
- 2007–2008: Gambia
- * Club domestic league appearances and goals

José María Martínez López (born 22 September 1942 in Larache, Morocco), sometimes known as Chito, is a Spanish professional football player and manager.

== Career ==
José Martínez played for Real Zaragoza, Jerez Industrial CF and other several Spanish clubs.

He has coached several Spanish sides. Since 25 April 2007 until 15 May 2008 he coached the Gambia national football team.
