= Football at the 1998 Indian Ocean Island Games =

Tournament details
- Host country: Réunion
- Teams: 5 (from 1 confederation)

Final positions
- Champions: Réunion (2nd title)
- Runners-up: Madagascar
- Third place: Seychelles

Tournament statistics
- Matches played: 9
- Goals scored: 35 (3.89 per match)

1998 Indian Ocean Games in Réunion

Played at Stade Linite in Réunion

== Group stage ==
=== Group A ===
Pos	Team	Pld	W	D	L	GF	GA	GD	Pts	Qualification
1	Réunion (H)	2	2	0	0	5	0	+5	6	Advance to knockout stage
2	Mauritius	2	0	0	2	0	5	−5	0	Advance to knockout stage

Source: IOCS
Rules for classification: Tie-breaking criteria
(H) Hosts
7 August 1998

Réunion	4–0	Mauritius
Lacollay 3', 49'; Bacco 45', 61'

Stade Linite, Saint-Denis, Réunion

11 August 1998

Mauritius	0–1	Réunion
		Trulès 76'

Stade Linite, Saint-Denis, Réunion

=== Group B ===
Pos	Team	Pld	W	D	L	GF	GA	GD	Pts	Qualification
1	Madagascar	2	2	0	0	8	2	+6	6	Advance to knockout stage
2	Seychelles	2	1	0	1	5	5	0	3	Advance to knockout stage
3	Comoros	2	0	0	2	0	6	−6	0	

Source: IOCS
Rules for classification: Tie-breaking criteria
7 August 1998

Madagascar	3–0	Comoros
Rasoanaivo 33'; Rijaly 55'; Mosa 67'

Stade Linite, Saint-Denis, Réunion

9 August 1998

Seychelles	3–0	Comoros
Goal

Stade Linite, Saint-Denis, Réunion

11 August 1998

Madagascar	5–2	Seychelles
Ratovonirina 20', 48'; Randrianaivo 23', 44'; Menakely 36'		Paul Khan 41'; Baldé 76'

Stade Linite, Saint-Denis, Réunion

== Knockout stage ==
Semi-finals
13 August
Madagascar	2
Mauritius	0
13 August
Réunion	2
Seychelles	0

Final
15 August
Madagascar	3 (6)
Réunion (p)	3 (7)
Third place
15 August
Mauritius	3
Seychelles	4

=== Semi-final ===
13 August 1998

Madagascar	2–0 (a.e.t.)	Mauritius
Randrianaivo 97'; Rijaly 117'

Stade Linite, Saint-Denis, Réunion

13 August 1998

Réunion	2–0	Seychelles
Bacco 61' (pen.); Lacollay 75'

Stade Linite, Saint-Denis, Réunion

=== Third place match ===
15 August 1998

Mauritius	3–4	Seychelles
François 3', 32'; Rateau 74'		Baldé 35'; V. Rose 46'; D. Rose 55'; Zialor 73'

Stade Linite, Saint-Denis, Réunion

== Final ==
15 August 1998

Madagascar	3–3 (a.e.t.)	Réunion
Randrianaivo 41'; Menakely; Christian Rakotoarimanana 119'
Penalties
Penalty scored Penalty missed	6–7	Penalty scored

Stade Linite, Saint-Denis, Réunion

== Final ranking ==
Pos	Team	Pld	W	D	L	GF	GA	GD	Pts	Final result
1	Réunion (H)	4	3	1	0	10	3	+7	10	Champions
2	Madagascar	4	3	1	0	13	5	+8	10	Runners-up
3	Seychelles	4	2	0	2	9	10	−1	6	Third place
4	Mauritius	4	0	0	4	3	11	−8	0	Fourth place
5	Comoros	2	0	0	2	0	6	−6	0	Group stage

Source: IOCS
(H) Hosts

Per statistical convention in football, matches decided in extra time are counted as wins and losses, while matches decided by penalty shoot-out are counted as draws.

== See also ==
- Indian Ocean Island Games
- Football at the Indian Ocean Island Games
