= Harry Randrianaivo =

Malagasy footballer

Personal information
- Date of birth: 10 September 1966 (age 60)
- Position: Forward

International career
Years	Team	Apps	(Gls)
1993–2003	Madagascar	19	(9)

Harry Randrianaivo (born 10 September 1966) is a retired Malagasy professional footballer.

== International goals ==
Scores and results list Madagascar's goal tally first, score column indicates score after each Madagascar goal.

List of international goals scored by Harry Randrianaivo
No.	Date	Venue	Opponent	Score	Result	Competition	Ref.
1	11 August 1998	Stade Linite, Saint-Denis, Réunion	Seychelles	2–0	5–2	1998 Indian Ocean Island Games	
2	11 August 1998	Stade Linite, Saint-Denis, Réunion	Seychelles	4–1	5–2	1998 Indian Ocean Island Games	
3	13 August 1998	Stade Michel Volnay, Saint-Pierre, Réunion	Mauritius	1–0	2–0	1998 Indian Ocean Island Games	
4	8 April 2000	Mahamasina Municipal Stadium, Antananarivo, Madagascar	Gabon	1–0	2–0	2002 FIFA World Cup qualification	
5	8 April 2000	Mahamasina Municipal Stadium, Antananarivo, Madagascar	Gabon	2–0	2–0	2002 FIFA World Cup qualification	
6	17 June 2000	Mahamasina Municipal Stadium, Antananarivo, Madagascar	DR Congo	3–0	3–0	2002 FIFA World Cup qualification	
7	15 July 2000	Mahamasina Municipal Stadium, Antananarivo, Madagascar	Botswana	1–0	2–0	2002 African Cup of Nations qualification	
8	2 September 2000	Independence Stadium, Lusaka, Zambia	Zambia	2–1	2–1	2002 African Cup of Nations qualification	
9	13 January 2001	Independence Stadium, Windhoek, Namibia	Namibia	1–0	2–2	2002 African Cup of Nations qualification	
