= Auguste Raux =

French football manager

Personal information
- Date of birth: 7 November 1954 (age 71)

Managerial career
- Years: Team
- AS Adema
- USJF Ravinala
- 2003: Madagascar
- 2013–2015: Madagascar
- 2016–2017: Madagascar

Auguste Raux (born 7 November 1954) is a French football coach who last managed the Madagascar national team.

== Career ==
Raux has managed the Madagascar national team during three spells - in 2003, from 2013 to 2015, and from June 2016 onwards. He also managed club sides AS Adema and USJF Ravinala.
