= Louis Démoléon =

Malagasy footballer (born 2003)

Personal information
- Full name: Louis Sébastien Démoléon
- Date of birth: 16 April 1997 (age 29)
- Place of birth: Paris, France
- Height: 1.91 m (6 ft 3 in)
- Position: Centre-back

Team information
- Current team: Trapani
- Number: 3

Youth career
- 2012–2013: CS Brétigny
- 2013–2015: Bordeaux
- 2015–2016: Vicenza

Senior career*
Years	Team	Apps	(Gls)
2015–2017	Vicenza	0	(0)
2016–2017	→ Olympia Agnonese (loan)	28	(3)
2017–2018	Prato	9	(0)
2018	Virtus Francavilla	2	(0)
2018–2019	Rotonda	9	(0)
2019–2020	Matelica	10	(0)
2020–2021	Real Giulianova	20	(0)
2021–2022	Molfetta	20	(0)
2022–2023	Città di Sant'Agata	16	(0)
2023–2024	Budoni	31	(1)
2024–2025	Enna	24	(0)
2025	Albalonga	5	(0)
2025–2026	Acireale	20	(0)
2026–	Trapani	0	(0)

International career^{‡}
2023–	Madagascar	10	(0)
- * Club domestic league appearances and goals as of 3 May 2026 ‡ National team caps and goals as of 13:53, 6 June 2025 (UTC)

Louis Sébastien Démoléon (born 16 April 1997) is a professional footballer who plays as a centre-back for Serie D Group I club Trapani. Born in France, he plays for the Madagascar national team.

== Club career ==
Born in Paris, France, Démoléon moved to Réunion from the age of 10 to 15. On his return, he played a season with CS Brétigny before a move to Bordeaux's academy for 2 seasons. He hardly played with Bordeaux, having fractured his leg before his move, and in 2015 moved to Italy with the youth academy of Vicenza. In 2016, he began his senior career on loan in the Serie D with Olympia Agnonese. On 11 August 2017 he transferred to AC Prato in the Serie C, where he signed his first professional contract for 2 seasons. When a new coach came in, he moved Serie D with Virtus Francavilla for the remainder of the 2017–18 season. That summer of 2018, he moved to Rotonda.

In 2019, Démoléon moved to Matelica where he helped them win the Coppa Italia Serie D in his debut season, followed by earning promotion to Serie C the second season. On 11 September 2020, he transferred to Real Giulianova. On 15 July 2021, he moved over to Molfetta Calcio. On 21 July 2022, he moved over to ACD Città di Sant'Agata. On 21 July 2023, he moved over to PC Budoni. In the summer of 2024, he returned to Serie D with Enna.

== International career ==
Démoléon was born in France, to a Réunionnais father of Malagasy descent, and a Martiniquias mother. He debuted with the Madagascar national team in a 1–0 2026 FIFA World Cup qualification loss to Ghana on 17 November 2023.

== Honours ==
Matelica

- Coppa Italia Serie D: 2019–2020
- Serie D: 2019–20
