= Peter Bonu Johnson =

Gambian footballer and manager (1963–2019)

Personal information
- Full name: Peter Pierre Benoit Johnson
- Date of birth: 10 May 1963
- Place of birth: Banjul, Gambia
- Date of death: 28 July 2019 (aged 56)
- Position: Defender

Senior career*
Years	Team	Apps	(Gls)
1983–1994	Flamemins		

International career
1983–1994	Gambia	38	(4)

Managerial career
- Gambia U-20
- 2004–2008: Gambia (assistant)
- 2011–2012: Gambia
- 2012–2013: Gambia (assistant)
- 2013–2015: Gambia
- * Club domestic league appearances and goals

Peter Bonu Johnson (10 May 1963 – 28 July 2019) was a Gambian professional football player and manager.

== Career ==
From 1983 to 1994 Peter Bonu Johnson played for the Gambia national team.

From July 2004 until May 2008 and from May 2012 until June 2013 he worked as an assistant coach with Gambia. He led Gambia U-20 to FIFA World Cup 2007 in Canada. From 9 January 2012 until 28 May 2012 he coached the Gambia national football team. In June 2013, he again was head coach of the Gambia national football team.

On 15 May 2015, Johnson left as manager of Gambia.

== Death ==
He died on 28 July 2019.
