= Shaanxi Construction Engineering Group Corporation =

Chinese construction and engineering contractor

- Company type: State owned enterprise
- Industry: Construction, engineering
- Headquarters: Xi'an, China
- Number of employees: 21,039
- Website: Shaanxi Construction Engineering (in English)

Shaanxi Construction Engineering Group Corporation (operating as Top International Engineering Corporation in international markets) is a Chinese construction and engineering contractor. SCEGC was established in 1950, and is among the Top 500 Chinese Corporations.

== Projects ==
The company in overseas operations is active across Africa and a few countries elsewhere. The main concentration of overseas branches is in West Africa with subsidiaries in Cameroon, Sao Tome & Principe, Sudan, Equatorial Guinea, Liberia, Gabon, Nigeria, Ghana, and Cape Verde. Other offices are located in the UAE, Papua New Guinea, Rwanda, and Congo.

In Ghana, it is the leading sub-contractor in a joint project with local firms to build 320 apartment blocks comprising 2,560 units designated by the government to meet an affordable housing shortfall.

== Philanthropy ==
During the 2007 floods in the Upper East Region of Ghana, the local subsidiary of SGEGC made a cash donation to relief for flood victims.
