= Idriss Déby Itno Stadium =

Stadium in Mandjafa, N'Djamena, Chad

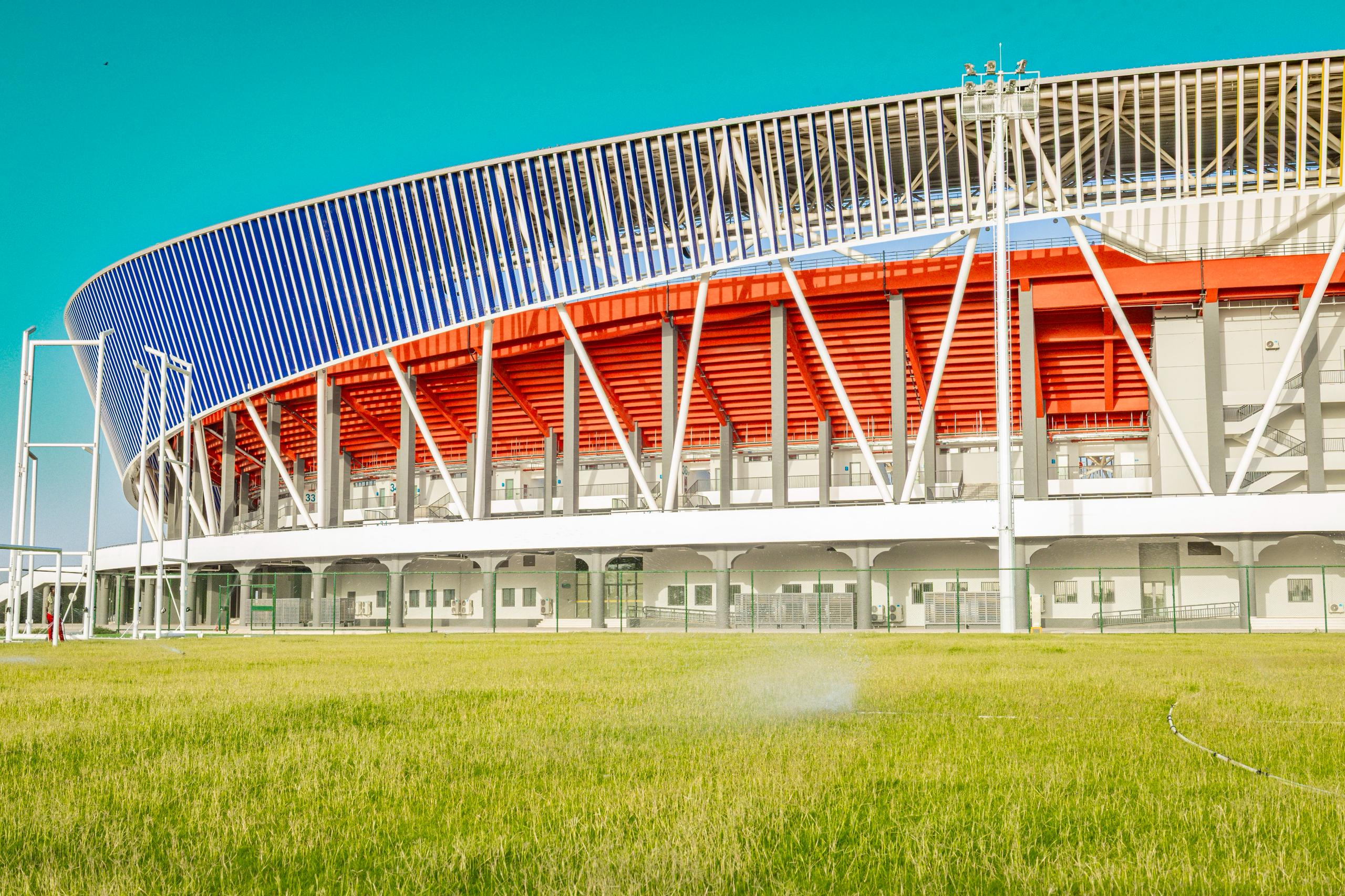

- Location within Chad
- Former names: Stade Mandjafa (planning/construction)
- Location: Mandjafa; N'Djamena, Chad
- Coordinates: 12.0525°N 15.157222°E
- Owner: Government of Chad
- Capacity: 30,000

Construction
- Groundbreaking: 2019
- Built: 2020-2024
- Opened: 2025
- Architect: Shaanxi Construction Engineering Group Corporation

Tenant
- Chad national football team (2025–present)

The Maréchal Idriss Déby Itno Olympic Stadium is a stadium in Mandjafa, in the 7th arrondissement of N'Djamena, Chad, which was inaugurated on May 23, 2025. It is the country's first modern stadium and was a gift from China to the government of Chad. In addition to football matches, the stadium can also host cultural events and track and field competitions. The stadium is decorated in the national colors of yellow, red, and blue and features a running track.

== Location ==
The stadium is located in the 7th arrondissement of N'Djamena, just under 15 kilometers from the city center, on the banks of the Chari River.

== History ==
The construction of the stadium was announced in 2018. On August 19, 2019, President Idriss Déby laid the cornerstone for the construction of Mandjafa Stadium. The sports complex, with a capacity of 30,000 seats, was built by a Chinese company at a cost of 50 billion CFA francs. Construction took 46 months and was completed in 2025. The arena was designed by the Shanghai Architectural Design & Research Institute and built by the Shaanxi Construction Engineering Group Corporation.

On May 13, 2025, the stadium was renamed Stade Olympique Maréchal Idriss Déby Itno, after the former president of Chad, who died in 2021. The opening ceremony, which took place on May 23, 2025, was presided over by his son and successor as president, Mahamat Idriss Déby Itno.

The stadium was first used by the Chad national football team for its matches in the round 8 of the African qualifiers for the 2026 FIFA World Cup when they got their first ever point in the campaign against Ghana, although the lone point was useless because the Sao were already eliminated from the qualification process in March 2025. In the 2027 AFCON prelim qualifiers, the stadium hosted a match vs. Burundi. Chad lost the match 4-0.

== Gallery ==
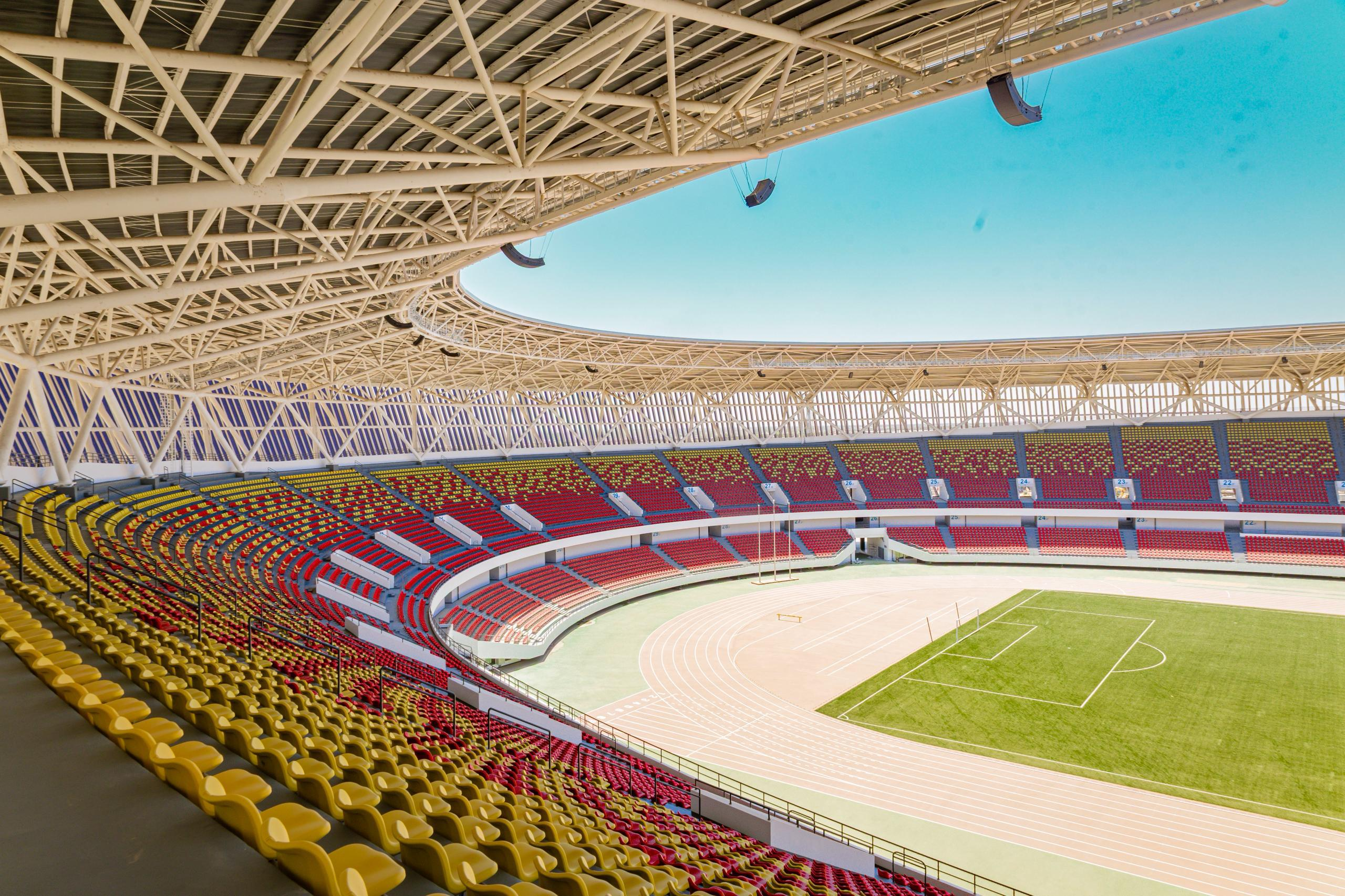

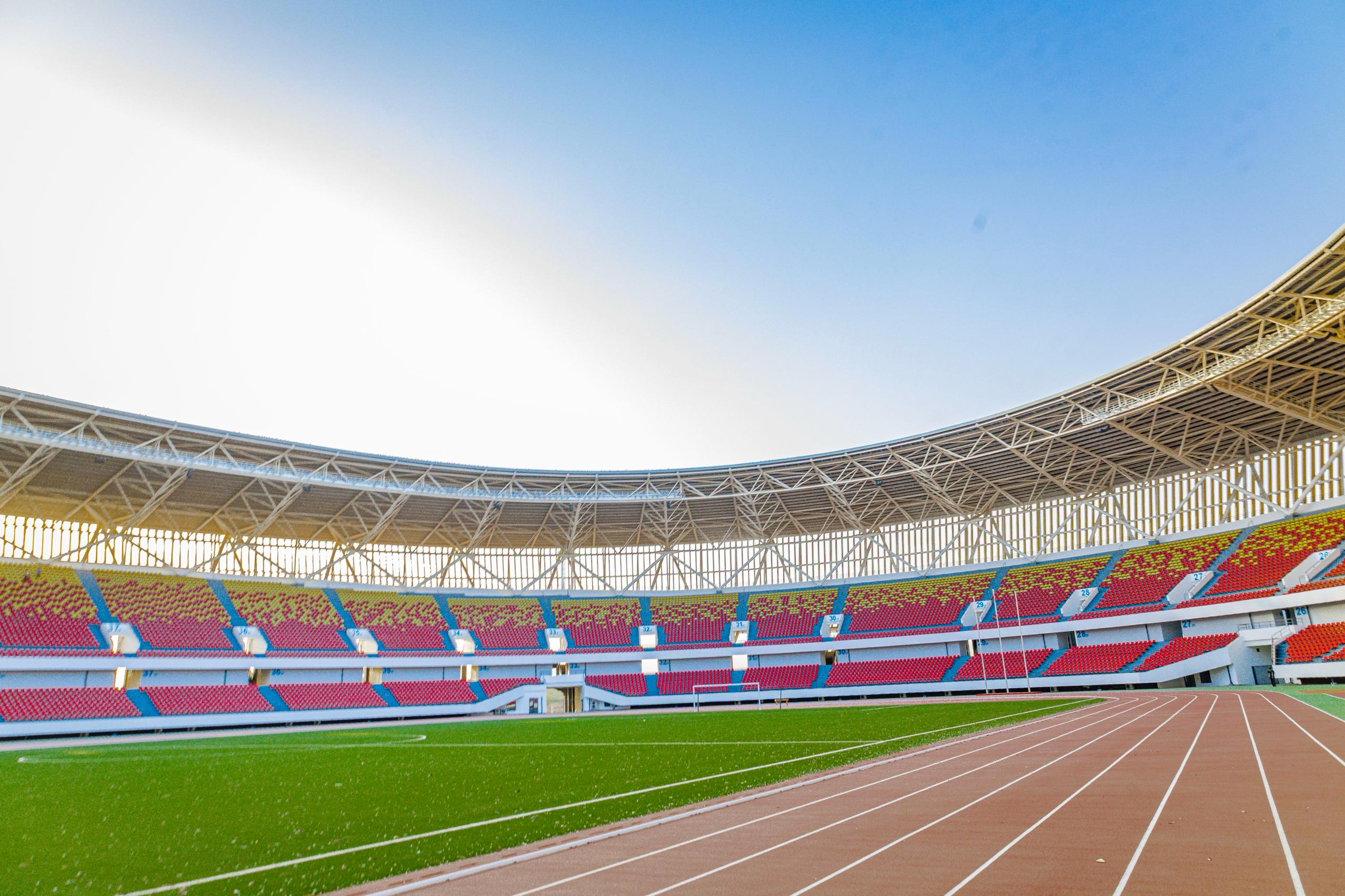

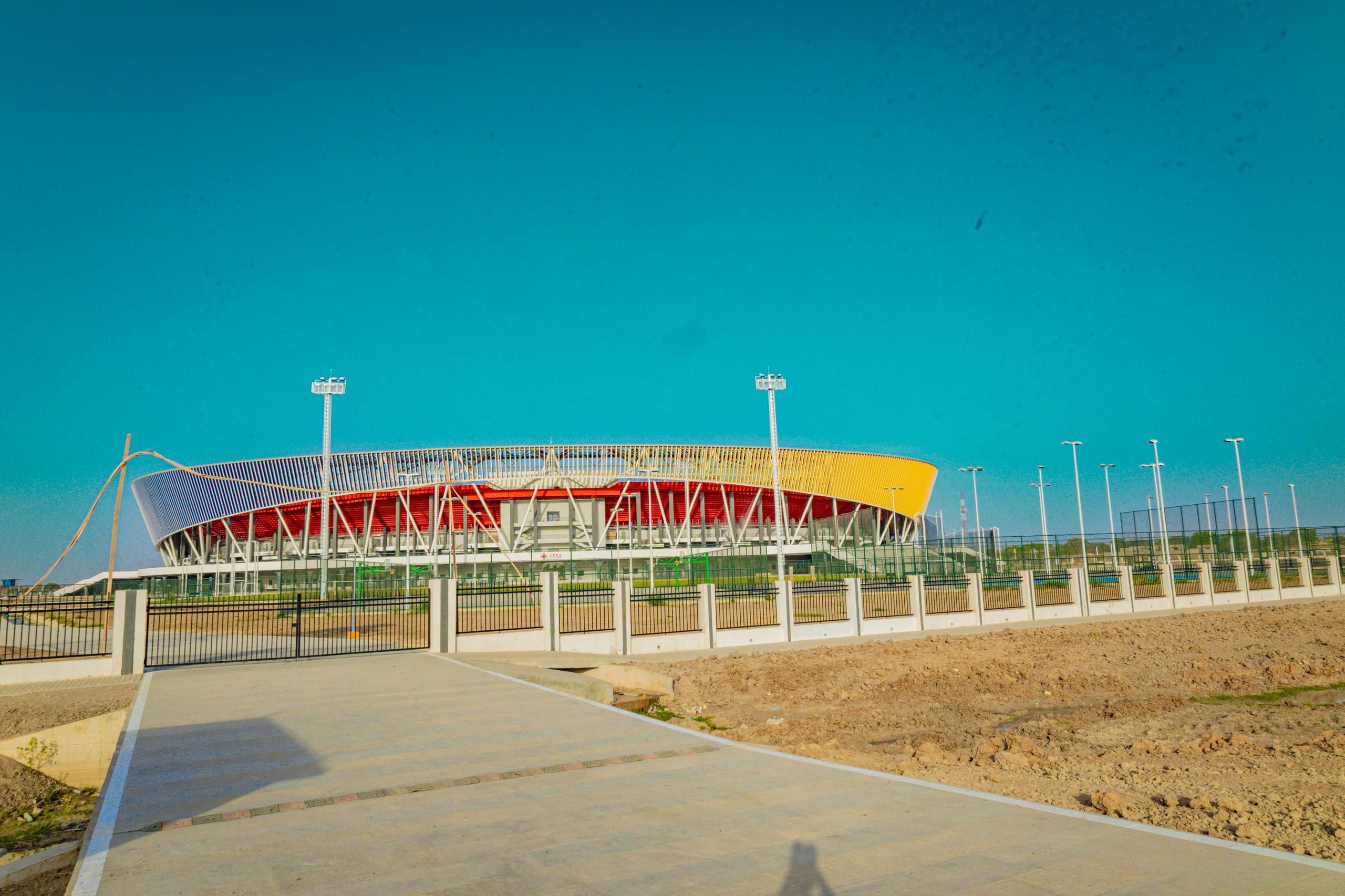
