= Madagascar national football team =

Men's association football team

Madagascar
- Nickname: Barea
- Association: Fédération Malagasy de Football (FMF)
- Confederation: CAF (Africa)
- Sub-confederation: COSAFA (Southern Africa)
- Head coach: Corentin Martins
- Captain: Rayan Raveloson
- Most caps: Paulin Voavy (67)
- Top scorer: Paulin Voavy (15)
- Home stadium: Mahamasina Stadium; Rabemananjara Stadium
- FIFA code: MAD
First colours	Second colours

FIFA ranking
- Current: 109 ▼3 (18 November 2026)
- Highest: 74 (December 1992)
- Lowest: 190 (March 2014)

First international
- Madagascar 1–2 Mauritius (Madagascar; Date Unknown 1947)

Biggest win
- Madagascar 8–1 Congo (Antananarivo, Madagascar; 19 April 1960)

Biggest defeat
- Mauritius 7–0 Madagascar (Réunion; 31 July 1952); Congo-Léopoldville 7–0 Madagascar (Congo; 18 July 1965)

Africa Cup of Nations
- Appearances: 1 (first in 2019)
- Best result: Quarter-finals (2019)

African Nations Championship
- Appearances: 2 (first in 2022)
- Best result: Runners-up (2024)

COSAFA Cup
- Appearances: 12 (first in 2002)
- Best result: Third place (2015)
Medal record
African Nations Championship
Silver medal – second place	2024 Kenya, Tanzania and Uganda
Bronze medal – third place	2022 Algeria
COSAFA Cup
Bronze medal – third place	2015 South Africa
Indian Ocean Island Games
Gold medal – first place	1990 Madagascar
Gold medal – first place	1993 Seychelles
Gold medal – first place	2023 Madagascar
Silver medal – second place	2007 Madagascar
Silver medal – second place	1998 Reunion

The Madagascar national football team, nicknamed Barea after the island's zebu, is the national team of Madagascar and is controlled by the Malagasy Football Federation. It has never qualified for the finals of the World Cup. It took part in its first Africa Cup of Nations in 2019. Among its biggest wins was a 1–0 home victory over Egypt in the qualification rounds of the 2004 Africa Cup of Nations until being surpassed by a recent 2–0 win over Nigeria in the group stage of the 2019 Africa Cup of Nations. Reflecting the official name of the country at the time, the team was known as the Malagasy Republic national football team between 1958 and 1975.

== History ==
Madagascar made its debut in 1947 in a home match against Mauritius which was lost 2–1. The game was part of a Triangulaire tournament between Madagascar, Mauritius and Reunion. Madagascar's second match was at home to Reunion and saw their first ever win, 4–2. The triangular tournament was staged every year until 1958, and Madagascar's highest-scoring game was on 13 July 1953 when they beat Reunion 6–4 at home. Their worst loss was on 31 July 1952 when they lost 7–0 to Mauritius in Reunion.

Madagascar played against opposition different from Mauritius or Reunion for the first time in 1960, as part of a tournament between French-speaking nations held on the island. In their first match on 15 April 1960 they beat the Upper Volta (now Burkina Faso) 6–1. The second game was a quarter-final against France's amateur side on 17 April and was lost 2–1. On 19 April Madagascar beat the Congo 8–1 in the third-place play-off.

In April 1963, Madagascar entered another competition for French-speaking countries, this time in Senegal, and was placed in a group with Dahomey (now Benin), Liberia and Chad. They opened with a 1–0 win over Dahomey on 11 April, and then beat Chad 2–1 on 13 April and Liberia 3–1 on 15 April. In the semi-finals, Madagascar were beaten 2–1 by Tunisia on 19 April, and then lost 4–1 to France's amateur team in the third-place play-off on 21 April.

In September 1963 the Triangulaire between Madagascar, Reunion and Mauritius was reinstated for the first time since 1958. On 15 September they beat Reunion 6–1 at home, and on 18 September drew 1–1 to Mauritius in a home game which was abandoned.

On 16 October 2018, Madagascar qualified to the 2019 Africa Cup of Nations for the first time in their history, after they won 1–0 against Equatorial Guinea. During their debut match against Guinea on 22 June 2019, Anicet Abel scored Madagascar's first-ever AFCON goal and secured their first point of the competition with a 2–2 draw against Guinea. The team defeated Burundi in their second match and followed it up with a 2–0 victory over the Super Eagles of Nigeria to top Group B. Then Madagascar advanced to quarter-finals after beating DR Congo in the round of 16. The team's successful performance was coined by pundits as the Iceland of Africa, resembling the shockingly successful debut of Iceland in UEFA Euro 2016. However, Madagascar's dream ended abruptly after suffering a 0–3 defeat at the hand of another former champion, Tunisia.

== Results and fixtures ==
The following is a list of match results in the last 12 months, as well as any future matches that have been scheduled.

Win Draw Loss Fixture

=== 2025 ===
17 November Friendly	Madagascar	2–0	Equatorial Guinea	Manavgat, Turkey
17:00 UTC+3	N'Zi 31'; Kari 33'	Report		Stadium: Arslan Zeki Demirci Sports Complex

=== 2026 ===
28 March Friendly	Kyrgyzstan	2–5	Madagascar	Belek, Türkiye
17:00 UTC+2	Almazbekov 58' (pen.); Köçkönbaev 62'	Report	Randrianantenaina 5'; Fontaine 17'; Caddy 24', 79' (pen.); Couturier 42'	Stadium: Calista Sports Center

31 March Friendly	Equatorial Guinea	1–1	Madagascar	Antalya, Türkiye
13:00 UTC+3	L. Zúñiga 45+3'	Report	Raveloson 62'	Stadium: Emirhan Sport Complex; Referee: Kadir Sağlam (Turkey)

2 June Friendly	Morocco	4–0	Madagascar	Rabat, Morocco
18:00 UTC+1	Saibari 4', 25'; Rahimi 78' (pen.); El Kaabi 87'			Stadium: Prince Moulay Abdellah Stadium; Referee: Boubou Traoré (Mali)

8 June Friendly	Uganda	Cancelled	Madagascar	Marrakesh, Morocco
--:-- UTC+1				Stadium: Marrakesh Stadium

25 September 2027 AFCON qualification	Nigeria	2–1	Madagascar	Uyo, Nigeria
18:00 UTC+0	Ilenikhena 45+1'; Usor 65'		Kari 16'	Stadium: Godswill Akpabio International Stadium

29 September 2027 AFCON qualification	Madagascar	v	Tanzania	TBD, Madagascar
15:00 UTC+0				Stadium: TBD

11 November 2027 AFCON qualification	Madagascar	v	Guinea-Bissau	TBD, Madagascar
TBD				Stadium: TBD

15 November 2027 AFCON qualification	Guinea-Bissau	v	Madagascar	TBD, Guinea-Bissau
TBD				Stadium: TBD

=== 2027 ===
24 March 2027 AFCON qualification	Madagascar	v	Nigeria	TBD, Madagascar
TBD				Stadium: TBD

28 March 2027 AFCON qualification	Tanzania	v	Madagascar	TBD, Tanzania
TBD				Stadium: TBD

== Coaching staff ==
Head coach	(France) Corentin Martins
Assistant coaches	(Madagascar) Andry Razakandrianaina (Madagascar) Hervé Andrianasimbola
Goalkeeping coach	(Madagascar) Nirina Rakotobololona
Fitness coach	(Madagascar) Michel Rajaonarinantenaina
Match analyst	(Madagascar) Flavien Andriamanomenjanahary
Performance coach	(Madagascar) Alphonse Rakotomanatsinoro
Team doctors	(Madagascar) Dr. Stéphane Rajaonaribololona (Madagascar) Dr. Hugo Rakotomalalanantenaina
Physiotherapists	(Madagascar) Gaël Njivarabesananteinaina (Madagascar) Christophe Rakotonantenaina (Madagascar) Philippe Ravelonomenjanahary (Madagascar) Razakaniaina Andriarakotobololona
Team coordinator	(Madagascar) Faneva Andriatsima
Technical director	(Madagascar) Éric Rabésandratana

=== Coaching history ===
- (West Germany) Peter Schnittger (1978–1985)
- (Madagascar) Justin Rasoloharimahefa (1994)
- (Madagascar) Claude Ravelomanantsoa (–2001)
- (Madagascar) Vincent Randriamirado (2001)
- (Madagascar) Jeremia Randriambololona (2001)
- (Switzerland) Hans Heiniger (2002–2003)
- (Madagascar) Hervé Arsène (2007–2008)
- (Madagascar) Mickael Nivoson Andrianasy (2008)
- (Madagascar) Jeremia Randriambololona (2008)
- (France) Jean-Paul Rabier (2010–2011)
- (Madagascar) Maurice Mosa (2011)
- (Madagascar) Frank Rajaonarisamba (2011–2012)
- (France) Auguste Raux (2012–2014)
- (Madagascar) Frank Rajaonarisamba (2014–2016)
- (France) Auguste Raux (2016–2017)
- (France) Nicolas Dupuis (2017–2021)
- (Madagascar) Éric Rabésandratana (2021–2022)
- (France) Nicolas Dupuis (2022–2023)
- (Madagascar) Romuald Rakotondrabe (2023–2025)
- (France) Corentin Martins (2025–)

== Players ==
=== Current squad ===
The following players were called up for the friendly match against Morocco on 2 June 2026, respectively.

Caps and goals updated after the match against Morocco on 2 June 2026.

No.	Pos.	Player	Date of birth (age)	Caps	Goals	Club
	GK	Michel Ramandimbisoa	11 February 1986 (age 40)	10	0	(Malagasy Football Federation) ASSM Elgeco Plus
	GK	Geordan Dupire	28 September 1993 (age 33)	10	0	(Luxembourg Football Federation) Atert Bissen
	DF	Thomas Fontaine	8 May 1991 (age 35)	36	2	(French Football Federation) GOAL FC
	DF	Radoniaina Rabemanantsoa	17 December 1997 (age 28)	29	0	(Malagasy Football Federation) Disciples FC
	DF	Sandro Trémoulet	18 November 1999 (age 27)	12	0	(Football Association of Serbia) Radnik
	DF	Louis Démoléon	16 April 1997 (age 29)	11	0	(Italian Football Federation) Acireale
	DF	Bono Rabearivelo	15 July 2007 (age 19)	9	0	(Malagasy Football Federation) Disciples FC
	DF	Ehsan Kari	17 May 2002 (age 24)	7	1	(French Football Federation) Fréjus Saint-Raphaël
	DF	Morgan Jean-Pierre	30 October 1992 (age 34)	12	0	(French Football Federation) Fleury
	DF	Mathieu Acapandié	14 December 2004 (age 21)	5	0	(Croatian Football Federation) Hajduk Split
	MF	Andy Rakotondrajoa	23 July 2003 (age 23)	6	0	(Malagasy Football Federation) Disciples FC
	MF	Rayan Raveloson (captain)	16 January 1997 (age 29)	50	9	(Swiss Football Association) Young Boys
	MF	Loïc Lapoussin	27 March 1996 (age 30)	25	1	(Chinese Football Association) Guangxi Hengchen
	MF	Mamisoa Rakotoson	3 June 2003 (age 23)	6	0	(Malagasy Football Federation) ASSM Elgeco Plus
	MF	Clément Couturier	13 September 1993 (age 33)	15	2	(French Football Federation) Thionville
	MF	Johan N'Zi	23 January 1995 (age 31)	12	2	(Israel Football Association) Bnei Sakhnin
	MF	Behaja Tsirava	26 October 2007 (age 19)	2	0	(Tunisian Football Federation) US Monastir
	FW	Arnaud Randrianantenaina	3 January 2001 (age 25)	31	5	(Egyptian Football Association) El Gouna
	FW	El Hadary Raheriniaina	19 August 2006 (age 20)	25	4	(French Football Federation) Valenciennes
	FW	Hakim Abdallah	9 January 1998 (age 28)	21	2	(Romanian Football Federation) UTA Arad
	FW	Ryan Ponti	22 June 1998 (age 28)	8	0	(French Football Federation) Rodez
	FW	Bryan Adinany	13 March 2000 (age 26)	7	0	(Royal Belgian Football Association) Kortrijk
	FW	Nicolas Fontaine	7 February 2000 (age 26)	3	0	(Bulgarian Football Union) Septemvri Sofia

=== Recent call-ups ===
The following players have been called up for Madagascar in the last 12 months and are still eligible to represent.

Pos.	Player	Date of birth (age)	Caps	Goals	Club	Latest call-up
GK	Zakanirina Rakotoasimbola	14 October 1999 (age 27)	21	0	(Réunion) La Tamponnaise	v. Equatorial Guinea, 31 March 2026
DF	Andy Pelmard	12 March 2000 (age 26)	3	0	(Poland) Jagiellonia Białystok	v. Equatorial Guinea, 31 March 2026
MF	Marco Ilaimaharitra	26 July 1995 (age 31)	37	3	(Belgium) Standard Liège	v. Equatorial Guinea, 31 March 2026
MF	Lalaïna Rafanomezantsoa	10 March 1998 (age 28)	39	5	(Algeria) Paradou AC	v. Equatorial Guinea, 17 November 2025
FW	Tommy Iva	2 June 2000 (age 26)	4	0	(France) Créteil	v. Equatorial Guinea, 31 March 2026
FW	Njiva Rakotoharimalala	6 August 1992 (age 34)	57	14	(Thailand) Ratchaburi	v. Equatorial Guinea, 17 November 2025
^{DEC} Player refused to join the team after the call-up.; ^{INJ} Player withdrew from the squad due to an injury.; ^{PRE} Preliminary squad.; ^{RET} Player has retired from international football.; ^{SUS} Suspended from the national team.

== Records ==
As of 31 March 2026
Players in bold are still active with Madagascar.

=== Most appearances ===
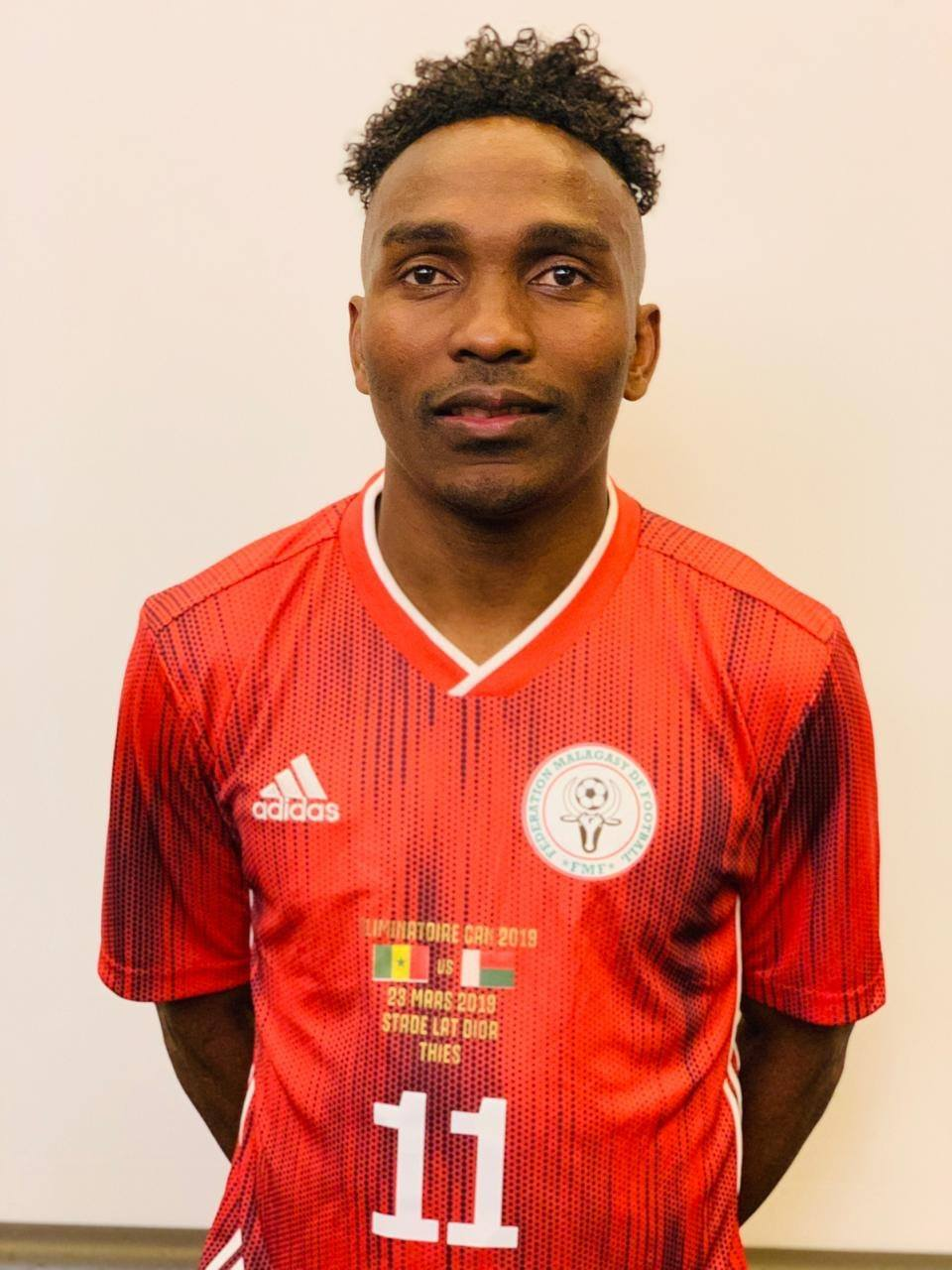
Paulin Voavy is Madagascar's top goalscorer and their most capped player.

Rank	Player	Caps	Goals	Career
1	Paulin Voavy	67	15	2007–2022
2	Mamisoa Razafindrakoto	63	0	1998–2011
3	**Njiva Rakotoharimalala**	57	14	2014–present
4	Gervais Randrianarisoa	52	0	2005–2022
5	Carolus Andriamatsinoro	49	12	2009–2024
5	Jimmy Radafison	49	0	2000–2011
5	**Rayan Raveloson**	49	9	2019–present
8	Ibrahim Amada	47	4	2008–2024
8	Faneva Imà Andriatsima	47	14	2003–2019
8	Lalaina Nomenjanahary	47	5	2006–2021
8	Eric-Julien Rakotondrabe	47	0	1999–2011

=== Top goalscorers ===
Rank	Player	Goals	Caps	Ratio	Career
1	Paulin Voavy	15	67	0.22	2007–2022
2	Faneva Imà Andriatsima	14	47	0.3	2005–2019
2	**Njiva Rakotoharimalala**	14	57	0.25	2014–present
4	Carolus Andriamatsinoro	12	49	0.24	2009–2024
5	Harry Randrianaivo	11	21	0.52	1990–2003
6	Ruphin Menakely	10	25	0.4	1998–2003
7	**Rayan Raveloson**	9	49	0.18	2019–present
8	Sarivahy Vombola	8	30	0.27	2011–2017
8	Rado Rasoanaivo	8	40	0.2	1992–2003
10	**Tsiry Randriantsiferana**	6	31	0.19	2022–present

== Competitive record ==
=== FIFA World Cup ===
FIFA World Cup record									Qualification record						
Year	Round	Position	Pld	W	D*	L	GF	GA	Pld	W	D	L	GF	GA	GR
1930 to 1958	Part of France								Part of France						
as Malagasy Republic									as Malagasy Republic						
(Chile) 1962	Not a FIFA member								Not a FIFA member						
1966 and 1970	Did not enter								Did not enter						
(West Germany) 1974	Withdrew								Withdrew						
as Madagascar									as Madagascar						
(Argentina) 1978	Did not enter								Did not enter						
(Spain) 1982	Did not qualify								2	0	1	1	3	4	details
(Mexico) 1986	Did not qualify								2	1	0	1	1	1	details
(Italy) 1990	Did not enter								Did not enter						
(United States) 1994	Did not qualify								4	3	0	1	7	3	details
(France) 1998	Did not qualify								2	0	1	1	3	4	details
(South Korea) (Japan) 2002	Did not qualify								10	3	0	7	7	16	details
(Germany) 2006	Did not qualify								2	0	1	1	3	4	details
(South Africa) 2010	Did not qualify								8	3	3	2	12	9	details
(Brazil) 2014	Did not qualify								2	1	0	1	2	3	details
(Russia) 2018	Did not qualify								4	1	2	1	7	7	details
(Qatar) 2022	Did not qualify								6	1	1	4	4	9	details
(Canada) (Mexico) (United States) 2026	Did not qualify								10	6	1	3	17	12	details
(Morocco) (Portugal) (Spain) 2030	To be determined								To be determined						details
(Saudi Arabia) 2034	To be determined								To be determined						details
Total	–	0/15	–	–	–	–	–	–	52	19	10	23	66	72	–

=== Africa Cup of Nations ===
Africa Cup of Nations record									Qualification record						
Year	Round	Position	Pld	W	D*	L	GF	GA	Pld	W	D*	L	GF	GA	GR
(Sudan) 1957	Part of France								Part of France						
(United Arab Republic) 1959	Part of France								Part of France						
(Ethiopia) 1962	Not affiliated to CAF								Not affiliated to CAF						
(Ghana) 1963	Not affiliated to CAF								Not affiliated to CAF						
(Tunisia) 1965	Did not enter								Did not enter						
(Ethiopia) 1968	Did not enter								Did not enter						
(Sudan) 1970	Did not enter								Did not enter						
(Cameroon) 1972	Did not qualify								2	1	0	1	3	5	details
(Egypt) 1974	Did not qualify								2	1	0	1	3	4	details
(Ethiopia) 1976	Withdrew								Withdrew						
(Ghana) 1978	Did not enter								Did not enter						
(Nigeria) 1980	Did not qualify								2	1	0	1	3	6	details
(Libya) 1982	Did not qualify								4	2	1	1	4	7	details
(Ivory Coast) 1984	Did not qualify								4	1	1	2	3	4	details
(Egypt) 1986	Did not qualify								2	0	0	2	2	6	details
(Morocco) 1988	Did not qualify								2	1	0	1	2	3	details
(Algeria) 1990	Withdrew								Withdrew						
(Senegal) 1992	Did not qualify								5	2	2	1	3	2	details
(Tunisia) 1994	Did not enter								Did not enter						
(South Africa) 1996	Withdrew during qualifiers								Withdrew during qualifiers						
(Burkina Faso) 1998	Banned for withdrawal in 1996								Banned for withdrawal in 1996						
(Ghana) (Nigeria) 2000	Did not qualify								8	2	3	3	9	12	details
(Mali) 2002	Did not qualify								8	2	2	4	7	8	details
(Tunisia) 2004	Did not qualify								4	2	0	2	2	8	details
(Egypt) 2006	Did not qualify								2	0	1	1	3	4	details
(Ghana) 2008	Did not qualify								4	0	0	4	0	14	details
(Angola) 2010	Did not qualify								8	3	3	2	12	9	details
(Gabon) 2012	Did not qualify								6	0	1	5	4	14	details
(South Africa) 2013	Did not qualify								2	0	0	2	1	7	details
(Equatorial Guinea) 2015	Did not qualify								2	1	0	1	2	2	details
(Gabon) 2017	Did not qualify								6	0	3	3	5	12	details
(Egypt) 2019	Quarter-finals	6th	5	2	2	1	7	7	8	5	1	2	12	10	details
(Cameroon) 2021	Did not qualify								6	2	2	2	9	9	details
(Ivory Coast) 2023	Did not qualify								6	0	3	3	1	9	details
(Morocco) 2025	Did not qualify								6	0	2	4	4	8	details
(Kenya) (Tanzania) (Uganda) 2027	To be determined								To be determined						
2029	To be determined								To be determined						
Total	Quarter-finals	1/35	5	2	2	1	7	7	99	26	25	48	94	163	–

=== African Nations Championship ===
African Nations Championship record									Qualification record						
Year	Round	Position	Pld	W	D*	L	GF	GA	Pld	W	D*	L	GF	GA	GR
(Ivory Coast) 2009	Did not enter								Did not enter						
(Sudan) 2011	Did not qualify								2	1	0	1	0	2	Details
(South Africa) 2014	Did not enter								Did not enter						
(Rwanda) 2016	Did not enter								Did not enter						
(Kenya) 2018	Did not qualify								6	3	2	1	6	3	Details
(Cameroon) 2020	Did not qualify								4	2	0	2	4	5	Details
(Algeria) 2022	Third place	3rd	5	4	0	1	9	3	4	3	1	0	6	1	Details
(Tanzania) (Kenya) (Uganda) 2024	Runners-up	2nd	7	3	2	2	9	7	2	1	0	1	2	1	Details
Total	Runners-up	2/7	12	7	0	3	18	10	18	10	3	5	18	12	—

=== African Games ===
African Games record								Qualification record						
Year	Result	Pld	W	D	L	GF	GA	Pld	W	D	L	GF	GA	GR
(Republic of the Congo) 1965	8th	3	0	0	3	0	13	2	1	0	1	6	3	details
(Nigeria) 1973	Withdrew							Withdrew						
(Algeria) 1978	Withdrew							Withdrew						
(Kenya) 1987	6th	3	1	0	2	4	5	2	1	0	1	3	3	details
(Egypt) 1991 to (Republic of the Congo) 2015	U-23 Tournament							U-23 Tournament						
(Morocco) 2019 – present	U-20 Tournament							U-20 Tournament						
Total	2/4	6	1	0	5	4	18	4	2	0	2	9	6	—

=== Indian Ocean Island Games ===
Indian Ocean Island Games record
Year	Round	Position	Pld	W	D*	L	GF	GA
(Réunion) 1979	Did not enter							
(Mauritius) 1985	Fourth place	4th	2	1	0	1	2	3
(Madagascar) 1990	Champions	1st	4	3	1	0	12	1
(Seychelles) 1993	Champions	1st	4	4	0	0	10	2
(Réunion) 1998	Runners-up	2nd	4	3	1	0	10	3
(Mauritius) 2003	Group stage	5th	2	0	1	1	2	4
(Madagascar) 2007	Runners-up	2nd	4	2	2	0	7	0
(Seychelles) 2011	Group stage	7th	2	0	1	1	2	3
(Réunion) 2015	Fourth place	4th	5	1	1	3	6	8
(Mauritius) 2019	Group stage	5th	2	0	2	0	2	2
(Madagascar) 2023	Champions	1st	4	3	1	0	7	3
Total	3 Titles	10/11	33	17	10	6	60	29

=== COSAFA Cup ===
COSAFA Cup record
Year	Round	Result	Pld	W	D	L	GF	GA
2000	Excluded							
2001	Excluded							
2002	Quarter-finals	5th	2	1	1	0	3	2
2003	Quarter-finals	7th	2	1	0	1	2	3
2004	Round 1	11th	1	0	0	1	0	2
2005	Round 1	10th	1	0	0	1	0	2
2006	Round 1	13th	2	0	0	2	0	4
2007	Round 1	8th	2	1	0	1	5	1
(South Africa) 2008	Fourth place	4th	6	2	2	2	6	7
(Zimbabwe) 2009	Did not enter							
(Zambia) 2013	Did not enter							
(South Africa) 2015	Third place	3rd	6	4	1	1	11	7
(Namibia) 2016	Group stage	11th	3	1	1	1	1	1
(South Africa) 2017	Group stage	9th	3	2	1	0	6	1
(South Africa) 2018	Fourth place	4th	6	2	2	2	4	4
(South Africa) 2019	Did not enter							
(South Africa) 2021	Did not enter							
(South Africa) 2022	Quarter-finals	5th	2	0	0	2	4	1
(South Africa) 2023	Did not enter							
(South Africa) 2024	Did not enter							
(South Africa) 2025	Fourth place	4th	4	1	1	2	3	6
Total	Third place	13/24	40	15	9	16	45	41

== Honours ==
=== Continental ===
- African Nations Championship
  - (silver) Runners-up (1): 2024
  - (bronze) Third place (1): 2022

=== Regional ===
- COSAFA Cup
  - (bronze) Third place (1): 2015
- Indian Ocean Island Games
  - (gold) Gold medal (3): 1990, 1993, 2023
  - (silver) Silver medal (2): 1998, 2007
- Indian Ocean Games Triangulaire
  - (gold) Champions (3): 1955, 1958, 1963
  - (silver) Runners-up (7): 1947, 1948, 1949, 1951, 1952, 1953, 1956
  - (bronze) Third place (3): 1950, 1954, 1957

=== Summary ===
Competition	1st place, gold medalist(s)	2nd place, silver medalist(s)	3rd place, bronze medalist(s)	Total
CAF African Nations Championship	0	1	1	2
Total	0	1	1	2
