= 1988 Arab Cup squads =

Below is a list of squads used in the 1988 Arab Cup.

== Group A ==
=== Egypt ===
Coach: (England) Mike Smith

No.	Pos.	Player	Date of birth (age)	Caps	Goals	Club
1	GK	Ahmed Shobair	28 September 1960 (aged 27)			(Egyptian Football Association) Al-Ahly
12	GK	Hussein El-Sayed	11 December 1964 (aged 23)			(Egyptian Football Association) Zamalek
2	DF	Ibrahim Hassan	10 August 1966 (aged 21)			(Egyptian Football Association) Al-Ahly
3	DF	Rabie Yassin	7 September 1960 (aged 27)			(Egyptian Football Association) Al-Ahly
5	DF	Hamada Sedki	25 August 1961 (aged 26)			(Egyptian Football Association) Al-Ahly
6	DF	Mohamed Omar	3 September 1958 (aged 29)			(Egyptian Football Association) Al-Ittihad Alexandria
21	DF	Hesham Yakan	10 August 1962 (aged 25)			(Egyptian Football Association) Zamalek
7	MF	Ismail Youssef	28 June 1964 (aged 24)			(Egyptian Football Association) Zamalek
10	MF	Gamal Abdel-Hamid	24 November 1957 (aged 30)			(Egyptian Football Association) Zamalek
14	MF	Alaa Maihoub	19 January 1963 (aged 25)			(Egyptian Football Association) Al-Ahly
16	MF	Tarek Soliman	24 January 1962 (aged 26)			(Egyptian Football Association) Al-Masry
30	MF	Taher Abouzeid	10 April 1962 (aged 26)			(Egyptian Football Association) Al-Ahly
	MF	Khaled Esmat	18 June 1963 (aged 25)			(Egyptian Football Association) Al-Mokawloon Al-Arab
4	FW	Ayman Younes	20 February 1964 (aged 24)			(Egyptian Football Association) Zamalek
9	FW	Hossam Hassan	10 August 1966 (aged 21)			(Egyptian Football Association) Al-Ahly
15	FW	Ayman Shawky	9 December 1962 (aged 25)			(Egyptian Football Association) Al-Ahly
18	FW	Mahmoud Hassan Saleh	4 May 1962 (aged 26)			(Egyptian Football Association) Ismaily

=== Iraq ===
Coach: Ammo Baba

No.	Pos.	Player	Date of birth (age)	Caps	Goals	Club
	GK	Ahmad Jassim	4 May 1960 (aged 28)			(Iraq Football Association) Al-Naft
	GK	Omar Ahmed Tawfiq	3 August 1970 (aged 17)			(Iraq Football Association) Al-Talaba
	GK	Wasfi Jabbar	1 July 1964 (aged 24)			(Iraq Football Association) Al-Shorta
	GK	Suhail Saber	1 June 1962 (aged 26)			(Iraq Football Association) Al-Talaba
	DF	Karim Allawi	1 April 1960 (aged 28)			(Iraq Football Association) Al-Rasheed
	DF	Radhi Shenaishil	11 August 1969 (aged 18)			(Iraq Football Association) Al-Zawra'a
	DF	Samir Shaker (c)	28 February 1958 (aged 30)			(Iraq Football Association) Al-Rasheed
	DF	Hassan Kamal	1 July 1964 (aged 24)			(Iraq Football Association) Al-Jaish
	DF	Ghanim Oraibi	16 August 1961 (aged 26)			(Iraq Football Association) Al-Shabab
	DF	Habib Jafar	1 July 1966 (aged 22)			(Iraq Football Association) Al-Rasheed
	DF	Mudhafar Jabbar	11 January 1965 (aged 23)			(Iraq Football Association) Al-Rasheed
	MF	Laith Hussein	13 October 1968 (aged 19)			(Iraq Football Association) Al-Rasheed
	MF	Basil Gorgis	15 January 1961 (aged 27)			(Iraq Football Association) Al-Shabab
	MF	Saad Qais	2 July 1967 (aged 21)			(Iraq Football Association) Al-Rasheed
	MF	Naeem Saddam	15 August 1969 (aged 18)			(Iraq Football Association) Al-Rasheed
	MF	Ismail Mohammed	19 January 1962 (aged 26)			(Iraq Football Association) Al-Shabab
	MF	Salam Hashim	7 October 1966 (aged 21)			(Iraq Football Association) Al-Rasheed
	DF	Karim Salman	4 March 1965 (aged 23)			(Iraq Football Association) Al-Rasheed
	FW	Younis Abed Ali	13 December 1969 (aged 18)			(Iraq Football Association) Al-Rasheed
	FW	Ahmed Radhi	21 April 1964 (aged 24)			(Iraq Football Association) Al-Rasheed
	FW	Rahim Hameed	23 May 1963 (aged 25)			(Iraq Football Association) Al-Jaish
	FW	Ali Abdul-Kadhim	28 November 1965 (aged 22)			(Iraq Football Association) Al-Rasheed

=== Lebanon ===
Coach: Zein Hashem and Mahmoud Berjawi

No.	Pos.	Player	Date of birth (age)	Caps	Goals	Club
	GK	Ali Rammal				(Lebanese Football Association) Nejmeh
	GK	Mahmoud Trad				(Lebanese Football Association) Al-Tadamon Beirut
	DF	Nabih Al-Jardi				(Lebanese Football Association) Safa
	DF	Youssef Farhat	1967			(Lebanese Football Association) Nejmeh
	DF	Jihad Jaber				(Lebanese Football Association) Nejmeh
	DF	Isam Kobeissi				(Lebanese Football Association) Al-Ansar
	MF	Hasan Abboud (c)	1959			(Lebanese Football Association) Nejmeh
	MF	Ghassan Abou Diab	18 January 1958 (aged 30)			(Lebanese Football Association) Safa
	FW	Bilal Al-Soufi				(Lebanese Football Association) Al-Riada Wal Adab
	FW	Walid Dahrouj	1965			(Lebanese Football Association) Safa
	FW	Mahmoud Hammoud	3 July 1964 (aged 24)			(Lebanese Football Association) Nejmeh
		Amin Al-Jamal				(Lebanese Football Association) Al-Ansar
		Khaldoun Al-Masri				(Lebanese Football Association) Al-Riada Wal Adab
		Ahmad Farhat				(Lebanese Football Association) Al-Ansar
		Ali Jaber				(Lebanese Football Association) Nejmeh
		Ali Kobeissi				(Lebanese Football Association) Al-Ansar
		Ziad Sakr				(Lebanese Football Association) Safa

=== Saudi Arabia Ol. ===
Coach:

No.	Pos.	Player	Date of birth (age)	Caps	Goals	Club
	GK	Hassan Khalifa	1970			(Saudi Arabian Football Federation) Al-Ittihad
	MF	Mohammed Al Farhan	8 September 1970 (aged 17)			(Saudi Arabian Football Federation) Al Qadsiah
		...				

=== Tunisia ===
Coach: Taoufik Ben Othman

No.	Pos.	Player	Date of birth (age)	Caps	Goals	Club
1	GK	Naceur Chouchane	3 May 1955 (aged 33)			(Tunisian Football Federation) ES Tunis
	DF	Abderrazak Chahat	14 January 1962 (aged 26)			(Tunisian Football Federation) Club Africain
	DF	Mohamed Ali Mahjoubi	28 December 1966 (aged 21)			(Tunisian Football Federation) AS Marsa
	DF	Imad Mizouri	20 October 1966 (aged 21)			(Tunisian Football Federation) CS Sfaxien
	DF	Mourad Okbi	1 September 1965 (aged 22)			(Tunisian Football Federation) JS Kairouan
	DF	Ali Ben Neji	26 September 1961 (aged 26)			(Tunisian Football Federation) ES Tunis
	MF	Noureddine Bousnina	17 January 1963 (aged 25)			(Tunisian Football Federation) CS Hammam-Lif
	MF	Nabil Maâloul (c)	25 December 1962 (aged 25)			(Tunisian Football Federation) ES Tunis
10	MF	Haithem Abid	22 September 1965 (aged 22)			(Tunisian Football Federation) ES Tunis
	MF	Adel Smirani	7 October 1967 (aged 20)			(Tunisian Football Federation) CA Bizertin
	MF	Taoufik Mehedhebi	13 December 1965 (aged 22)			(Tunisian Football Federation) Stade Tunisien
	MF	Modher Baouab	13 May 1961 (aged 27)			(Tunisian Football Federation) ES Tunis
	MF	Mohsen Yahmadi				(Tunisian Football Federation) COT
7	FW	Bassam Jeridi	25 April 1962 (aged 26)			(Tunisian Football Federation) ES Tunis
9	FW	Kais Yakoubi	18 August 1966 (aged 21)			(Tunisian Football Federation) Club Africain
	FW	Lotfi Rouissi	13 November 1965 (aged 22)			(Tunisian Football Federation) Club Africain

== Group B ==
=== Algeria UT ===
Coach: Noureddine Saâdi and Abdelmalek Arraoui

No.	Pos.	Player	Date of birth (age)	Caps	Goals	Club
1	GK	Djamel Chater	6 August 1964 (aged 23)			(Algerian Football Federation) Espérance d'Aïn M'lila
	GK	Bachir Yassa				(Algerian Football Federation) Université d'Annaba
	DF	Abderrazak Dahmani	23 February 1964 (aged 24)			(Algerian Football Federation) Jeunesse de Belcourt
	DF	Mounir Zeghdoud	18 November 1970 (aged 17)			(Algerian Football Federation) Chabab de Constantine
	DF	Noureddine Bounaâs	18 October 1965 (aged 22)			(Algerian Football Federation) Mouloudia de Constantine
	DF	Rabah Kourifa	10 March 1963 (aged 25)			(Algerian Football Federation) Union d'Alger
	DF	Omar Belatoui	6 April 1969 (aged 19)			(Algerian Football Federation) Mouloudia d'Oran
	MF	Moussa Saïb	6 March 1969 (aged 19)			(Algerian Football Federation) Jeunesse de Tiaret
	MF	Farid Mouaci	27 February 1964 (aged 24)			(Algerian Football Federation) Union d'Alger
	MF	Saïd Hamrani	26 February 1962 (aged 26)			(Algerian Football Federation) Jeunesse de Bordj Ménaïel
	MF	Rabie Nafaâ				(Algerian Football Federation) Jeunesse de Bordj Ménaïel
	MF	Abdellah Sedrati				(Algerian Football Federation) Flambeau de Skikda
	FW	Djellal Hamani				(Algerian Football Federation) Mouloudia de Constantine
	FW	Mohamed Lotfi Manaâ	21 November 1964 (aged 23)			(Algerian Football Federation) Université d'Annaba
	FW	Nacer Chekati				(Algerian Football Federation) Entente de Guelma
	FW	Rachid El-Groud				(Algerian Football Federation) Mouloudia de Constantine
	FW	Walid Chenini				(Algerian Football Federation) Université d'Annaba
	FW	Rachid Hamada				(Algerian Football Federation) Raed de Kouba
	FW	Khelifa Belhouchet	25 August 1963 (aged 24)			(Algerian Football Federation) Mouloudia d'El Eulma
	FW	Tarek Hadj Adlane	11 December 1965 (aged 22)			(Algerian Football Federation) Union d'Alger

=== Bahrain ===
Coach: (Tunisia) Abdelmajid Chetali

No.	Pos.	Player	Date of birth (age)	Caps	Goals	Club
	MF	Adil Al-Salimi				(Bahrain Football Association)

=== Jordan ===
Coach: (Socialist Federal Republic of Yugoslavia) Slobodan Ogsananovic

No.	Pos.	Player	Date of birth (age)	Caps	Goals	Club
1	GK	Milad Abbasi	1 January 1958 (aged 30)			(Jordan Football Association) Al-Faisaly
22	GK	Khaldoun Arshidat	2 June 1967 (aged 21)			(Jordan Football Association)
2	DF	Najeeb Al-Banna	20 November 1963 (aged 24)			(Jordan Football Association) Al-Jazeera
5	DF	Zaid Al-Sharaa				(Jordan Football Association) Al-Ramtha
6	DF	Esam Al-Telli	14 July 1962 (aged 25)			(Jordan Football Association) Al-Jazeera
15	DF	Haitham Abdel-Hadi				(Jordan Football Association) Al-Hussein Irbid
19	DF	Yousef Al-Amori	22 November 1966 (aged 21)			(Jordan Football Association) Al-Wehdat
10	MF	Fayez Al-Bedawi	5 August 1962 (aged 25)			(Jordan Football Association) Al-Ramtha
13	MF	Moneeb Gharaibeh	1 January 1965 (aged 23)			(Jordan Football Association) Al-Hussein Irbid
14	MF	Tawfiq Al-Saheb	1 January 1961 (aged 27)			(Jordan Football Association) Al-Jazeera
18	MF	Marwan Malek Khairi				(Jordan Football Association)
7	FW	Raed Assaf				(Jordan Football Association)
11	FW	Maher Abu Hantash	9 April 1967 (aged 21)			(Jordan Football Association)
16	FW	Nart Yadaje	26 April 1969 (aged 19)			(Jordan Football Association) Al-Ahli Amman
17	FW	Jihad Abdel Muneim	3 March 1968 (aged 20)			(Jordan Football Association) Al-Wehdat
20	FW	Adnan Al-Turk				(Jordan Football Association) Al-Ahli Amman

=== Kuwait Ol. ===
Coach: (Brazil) Miguel Ferreira

No.	Pos.	Player	Date of birth (age)	Caps	Goals	Club
1	GK	Husain Zayed	23 May 1968 (aged 20)			(Kuwait Football Association) Al-Yarmouk
3	DF	Amer Yasser				(Kuwait Football Association) Al-Arabi
	MF	Mansour Basha	3 September 1970 (aged 17)			(Kuwait Football Association) Al-Arabi
	MF	Waleed Al Breiki				(Kuwait Football Association) Al-Salmiya
	MF	Abed Al Shammari	19 January 1965 (aged 23)			(Kuwait Football Association) Al-Qadsia
12	FW	Fahad Marzouq	2 January 1971 (aged 17)			(Kuwait Football Association) Al Tadhamon
	FW	Ali Marwi	14 October 1969 (aged 18)			(Kuwait Football Association) Al-Salmiya
		...				

=== Syria ===
Coach: (Soviet Union) Anatoliy Azarenkov

No.	Pos.	Player	Date of birth (age)	Caps	Goals	Club
21	GK	Walid Islam				(Syrian Football Association) Al-Jaish
22	GK	Malek Shakuhi	5 April 1960 (aged 28)			(Syrian Football Association) Jableh
3	DF	Ammar Habib	25 October 1967 (aged 20)			(Syrian Football Association) Tishreen
4	DF	Yousef Hawla				(Syrian Football Association) Tishreen
12	DF	Ahmad Al-Shaar	12 July 1965 (aged 22)			(Syrian Football Association) Al-Jaish
13	DF	Abdullah Saddikah	13 November 1971 (aged 16)			(Syrian Football Association)
17	DF	Samer Darwish				(Syrian Football Association) Al-Wahda
19	DF	Joseph Leyous				(Syrian Football Association) Al-Hurriya
6	MF	Saad Saad				(Syrian Football Association)
8	MF	Abdul Kader Kardaghli (c)	1 January 1961 (aged 27)			(Syrian Football Association) Al-Jaish
10	MF	Faisal Ahmad				(Syrian Football Association)
25	MF	Radwan Ajam	1965			(Syrian Football Association) Al-Karamah
9	FW	Nizar Mahrous	12 March 1963 (aged 25)			(Syrian Football Association) Al-Wahda
11	FW	Hussein Deeb				(Syrian Football Association)
14	FW	Mohammad Jakalan	1961			(Syrian Football Association) Al-Ittihad Aleppo
18	FW	Walid Al-Nasser	18 June 1965 (aged 23)			(Syrian Football Association) Al-Hurriya
