= 1994 African Cup of Champions Clubs final =

1994 African Champions Cup final
- Event: 1994 African Cup of Champions Clubs
Zamalek SC	ES Tunis
(Egypt)	(Tunisia)
1	3

First leg
Zamalek SC	ES Tunis
0	0
- Date: 4 December 1994
- Venue: Cairo International Stadium, Cairo
- Referee: Omer Yengo (Congo)

Second leg
ES Tunis	Zamalek SC
3	1
- Date: 17 December 1994
- Venue: Stade El Menzah, Tunis
- Referee: Lim Kee Chong (Mauritius)

The 1994 African Cup of Champions Clubs final was the decisive tie of the 30th edition of the African Cup of Champions Clubs, Africa's premier club football competition. It was contested over two legs between defending champions Zamalek of Egypt and Espérance de Tunis of Tunisia.

Zamalek entered the final seeking a record fourth African title, having previously won the competition in 1984, 1986 and 1993. Espérance, meanwhile, were appearing in their first final of the African Cup of Champions Clubs and were seeking the first continental title in the club's history.

The first leg, played in Cairo on 4 December 1994, ended in a goalless draw. In the return leg at Stade El Menzah in Tunis on 17 December, Espérance won 3–1 through two goals from Hédi Berkhissa and a penalty from captain Ali Ben Neji, while Effat Nssar scored Zamalek's late consolation goal. Espérance therefore won the tie 3–1 on aggregate and were crowned African champions for the first time.

== Venues ==
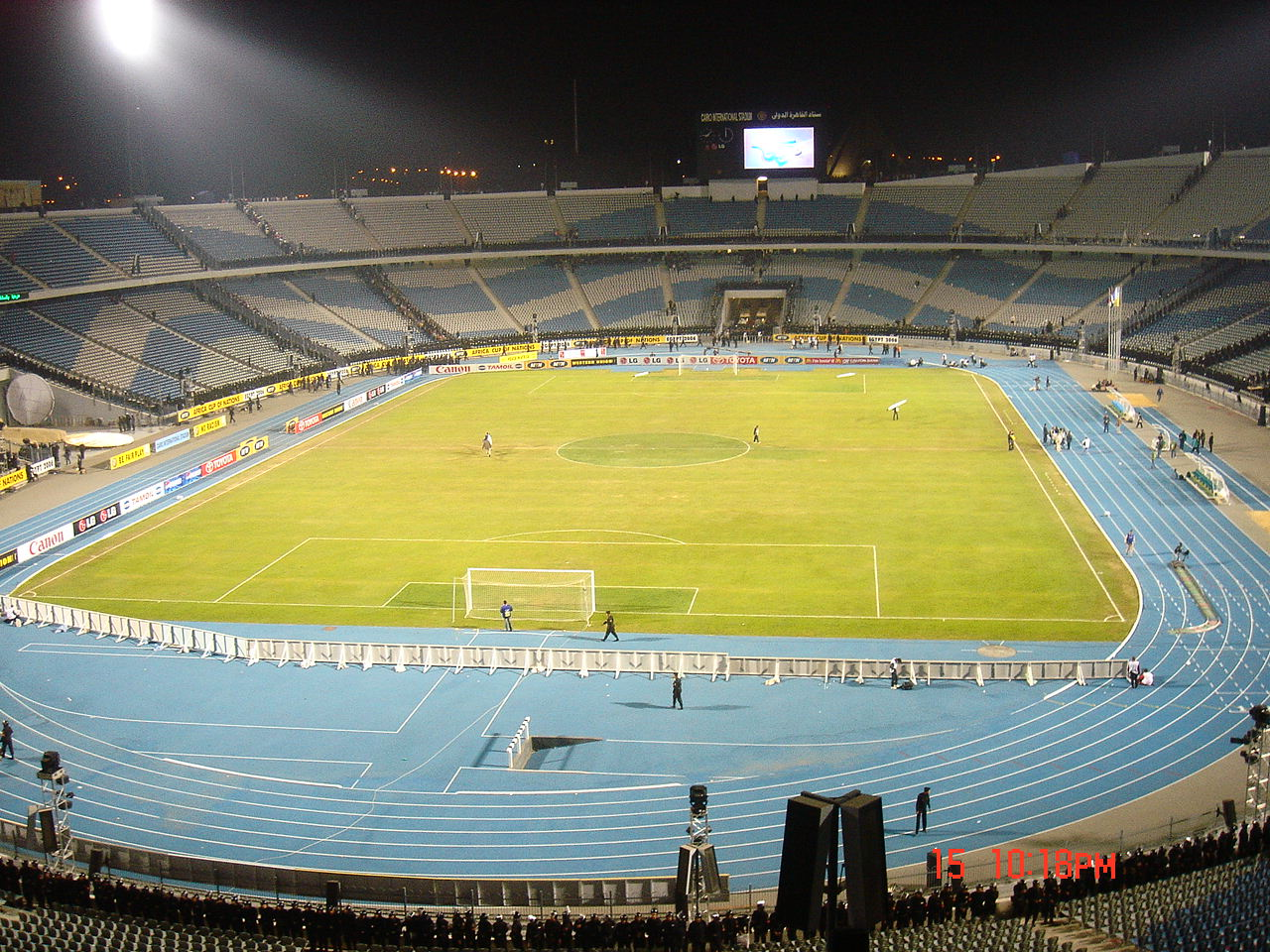
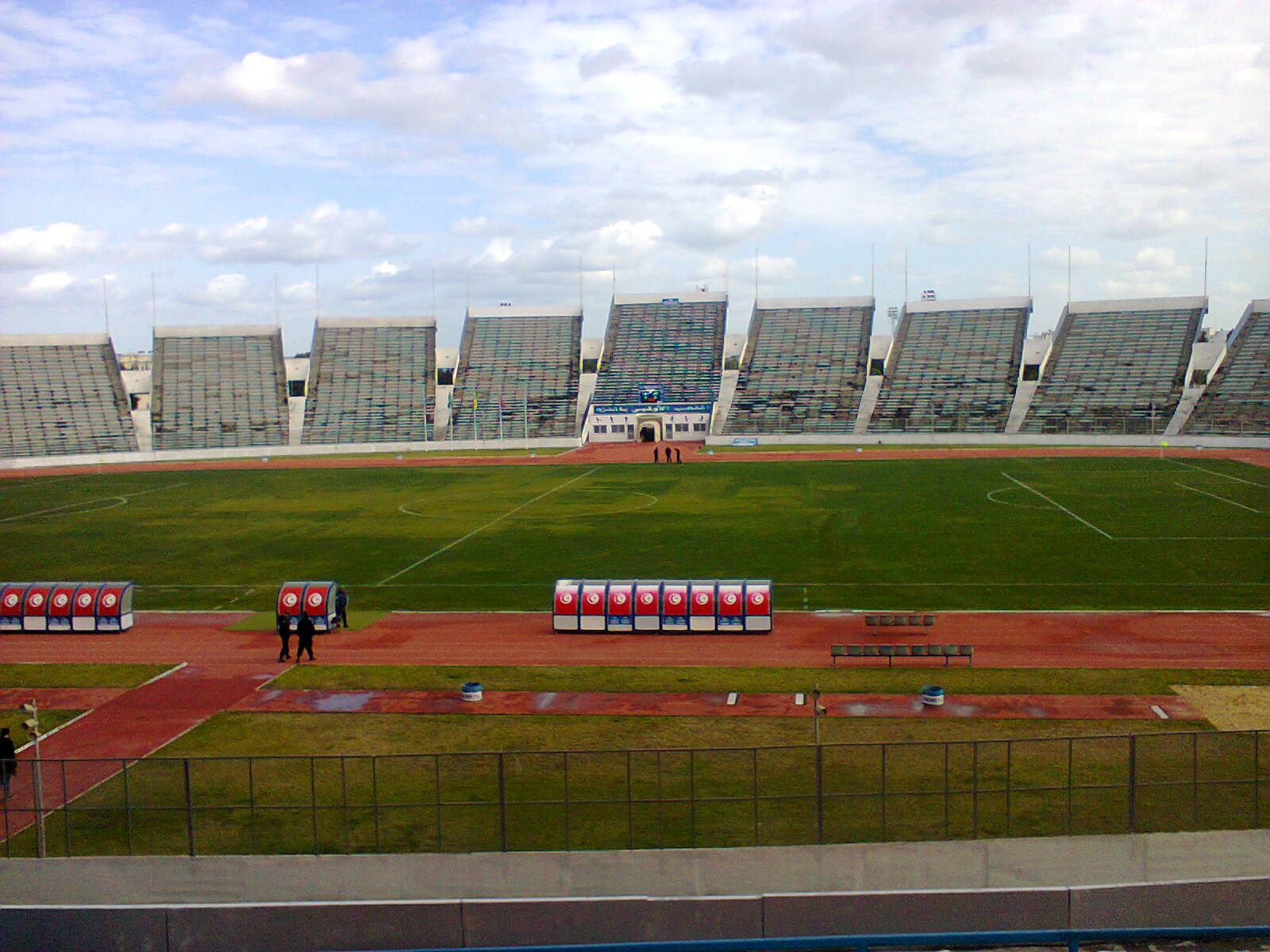
The Cairo International Stadium (left) and the Stade Olympique d'El Menzah, venues for the series

== First leg ==
=== Pre-match ===
Zamalek entered the final as both the holders of the African Cup of Champions Clubs and one of the continent's most decorated teams. The Egyptian club had won its third continental title in 1993 after defeating Asante Kotoko on penalties and began 1994 by beating domestic rivals Al Ahly 1–0 in the CAF Super Cup. Their season had otherwise been less successful: Zamalek surrendered the Egyptian league title and in September were defeated by Thailand's Thai Farmers Bank in the Afro-Asian Club Championship on the away-goals rule.

The squad had also undergone changes since the previous year's continental triumph. Nigerian international Emmanuel Amunike had left for Sporting CP, while defender Ashraf Quasem returned following a spell with Saudi club Al-Hilal. Austrian coach Alfred Riedl nevertheless retained an experienced group containing several Egyptian internationals, including Hesham Yakan, Ismail Youssef, Mohamed Sabry and Khaled El Ghandour, alongside Ghanaian players Oscar Laud and Joe Okyere.

Espérance arrived in Cairo in strong form. Faouzi Benzarti's side had progressed through the competition without losing an away match, recording victories at Étoile Filante and Stade Malien before drawing away to Iwuanyanwu Nationale and MC Oran. They had also recorded a 4–0 victory over city rivals Club Africain shortly before the final.

The Tunisian side's attack was led by Zambian striker Kenneth Malitoli and Ayadi Hamrouni, while captain Ali Ben Neji, goalkeeper Chokri El Ouaer, Tarek Thabet and Mohamed Ali Mahjoubi formed the experienced core of the team. Benzarti's stated priority for the first leg was to contain Zamalek and return to Tunis with the tie still within reach; in the build-up he summarised Espérance's objective simply as "tenir" ("hold firm").

=== Match summary ===
The first leg was played in Cairo before approximately 90,000 spectators, including around 3,000 travelling Tunisian supporters. Despite having been regarded as underdogs against the defending champions, Espérance produced an organised performance and retained the two-forward partnership of Kenneth Malitoli and Ayadi Hamrouni. Zamalek adopted the more attacking approach, but were described as more nervous in their play, while Espérance relied on their defensive organisation and an inspired performance from goalkeeper Chokri El Ouaer to resist the hosts' pressure.

Although Zamalek were the more offensively inclined side, the contest remained largely balanced. Their best opportunity arrived in the 70th minute when Ghanaian forward Oscar Laud put the ball into the net, only for congolese referee Omer Yengo to disallow the goal for offside. The match was also briefly interrupted after a number of spectators entered the pitch.

After the interval, Zamalek coach Alfred Riedl attempted to increase his side's attacking threat by introducing Ghanaian forward Joe Okyere for Islam Fathi in the 53rd minute, before Effat Nassar replaced Mohamed Sabry in the 70th. Espérance made only one substitution, with Hassen Gabsi replacing Abdelkader Ben Hassen in the 84th minute. Neither side managed to find a breakthrough and the match finished 0–0, allowing Espérance to preserve their unbeaten away record in the competition and return to Tunis with the tie still level ahead of the second leg.

=== Match details ===
1994 African Champions Cup final
4 December 1994
First leg

Zamalek (Egypt)	0–0 (Note: The starting lineups for this match are taken from France Football (Paris), no. 2539.)	(Tunisia) Espérance de Tunis

Cairo International Stadium, Cairo
Attendance: 90,000
Referee: Omer Yengo (Republic of the Congo)

GK	(Egypt) Hussein El-Sayed
DF	(Egypt) Hussein Abdel Latif
DF	(Egypt) Hesham Yakan
DF	(Egypt) Ashraf Quasem
DF	(Egypt) Medhat Abdel Hady
MF	(Egypt) Ashraf Youssef
MF	(Egypt) Ismail Youssef
MF	(Egypt) Islam Fathi	(substituted off) 53'
MF	(Egypt) Mohamed Sabry	(substituted off) 70'
MF	(Egypt) Khaled El Ghandour
FW	(Ghana) Oscar Laud
Substitutes:
FW	(Ghana) Joe Okyere	(substituted on) 53'
MF	(Egypt) Effat Nassar	(substituted on) 70'
Manager:
(Austria) Alfred Riedl

GK	(Tunisia) Chokri El Ouaer
DF	(Tunisia) Tarek Thabet
DF	(Tunisia) Hédi Berkhissa
DF	(Tunisia) Noureddine Bousnina (c)
DF	(Tunisia) Hakim Nouira
DF	(Tunisia) Ali Ben Neji
MF	(Tunisia) Sirajeddine Chihi
MF	(Tunisia) Ali Mahjoubi
MF	(Tunisia) Ayadi Hamrouni
FW	(Tunisia) Abdelkader Ben Hassen	(substituted off) 84'
FW	(Zambia) Kenneth Malitoli
Substitutes:
MF	(Tunisia) Hassen Gabsi	(substituted on) 84'
Manager:
(Tunisia) Faouzi Benzarti

== Second leg ==
=== Pre-match ===
Following the goalless first leg, anticipation in Tunis was considerable. Espérance had been seeking the African title since first entering the competition in 1971 and were attempting to become the second Tunisian club to win the tournament after Club Africain's triumph in 1991.

The club sought to reduce the pressure surrounding the team during the week before the match. The players were largely kept away from the press and supporters, while training sessions were moved between Parc B, Stade Chedly Zouiten and Stade El Menzah in an effort to preserve privacy during preparations. Club president Slim Chiboub stated that Espérance would adopt a different approach from the first leg and play according to the requirements of the return fixture.

The occasion also revived memories of Espérance's defeat in the 1987 African Cup Winners' Cup final against Gor Mahia, when the Tunisian club had drawn both legs but lost the trophy on away goals. Haïthem Abid was the only remaining member of that squad involved with the team in 1994.

Benzarti was able to field close to his preferred side for the return match. Malitoli and Hamrouni provided the principal attacking threat, while El Ouaer, Ben Neji, Thabet and Mahjoubi formed the backbone of the team. Particular attention was also beginning to fall on 22-year-old Hédi Berkhissa, known to supporters as "Balha", a home-grown player whose energetic role enabled him to move rapidly between defensive pressing and attacking support.

Zamalek approached the return leg with a defensively weighted selection. Riedl fielded eight players described by France Football as primarily defensive in orientation, while creative midfielders Mohamed Sabry and Khaled El Ghandour began the match on the bench. Ghanaian forwards Joe Okyere and Oscar Laud were entrusted with much of the visitors' attacking responsibility.

=== Match summary ===
Zamalek created the first major opportunity almost immediately. An error by Mohamed Ali Mahjoubi allowed Okyere to break into a promising position in the opening minute, but his attempted lob was stopped by goalkeeper Chokri El Ouaer.

Espérance subsequently took control of the match and opened the scoring in the 16th minute. Hamrouni delivered a left-footed corner into the penalty area and Berkhissa rose to head the ball beyond Hussein El-Sayed, giving the home side a 1–0 lead.

The goal increased the tension of the contest. Zamalek protested the decision and the match later became increasingly physical, with confrontations involving players and substitutes. Play was interrupted on two occasions, for approximately seven minutes in total, as the officials attempted to restore order.

Early in the second half Espérance were awarded a penalty after Abdelkader Ben Hassen was brought down inside the area. Captain Ali Ben Neji converted the resulting spot kick in the 52nd minute to extend the lead to 2–0.

Berkhissa then scored his second goal of the match in the 62nd minute. A counter-attack developed along the left side before Hamrouni found Berkhissa near the edge of the penalty area, and the 22-year-old finished the move to make the score 3–0.

With Zamalek now requiring three goals to recover the tie, Espérance concentrated on protecting their advantage during the closing stages. The Egyptian side eventually scored in the 87th minute through substitute Effat Nassar, but the goal came too late to threaten the outcome.

Espérance won the match 3–1 and the final by the same aggregate score, securing their first African Cup of Champions Clubs title.

=== Match Details ===
17 December 1994
Second leg

Espérance de Tunis (Tunisia)	3–1 (Note: The starting lineups for this leg are taken from France Football (Paris), no. 2541.)	(Egypt) Zamalek
Berkhissa 16', 62'; Ben Neji 52' (pen.)		Nassar 87'

Stade El Menzah, Tunis
Attendance: 45,000
Referee: Lim Kee Chong (Mauritius)

GK	(Tunisia) Chokri El Ouaer
DF	(Tunisia) Tarek Thabet
DF	(Tunisia) Hakim Nouira	(substituted off) 91'
DF	(Tunisia) Noureddine Bousnina
DF	(Tunisia) Ali Mahjoubi
MF	(Tunisia) Ali Ben Neji
MF	(Tunisia) Sirajeddine Chihi
MF	(Tunisia) Hédi Berkhissa	(yellow card) 33'
FW	(Zambia) Kenneth Malitoli
FW	(Tunisia) Abdelkader Ben Hassen	(substituted off) 77'
FW	(Tunisia) Ayadi Hamrouni
Substitutes:
MF	(Tunisia) Hassen Gabsi	(substituted on) 77'
MF	(Tunisia) Marouene Guezmir	(substituted on) 91'
Manager:
(Tunisia) Faouzi Benzarti

GK	(Egypt) Hussein El-Sayed
DF	(Egypt) Talaat Mansour
DF	(Egypt) Hesham Yakan
DF	(Egypt) Ashraf Quasem
DF	(Egypt) Medhat Abdel Hady
MF	(Egypt) Ashraf Youssef	(substituted off) 55'
MF	(Egypt) Ismail Youssef	(yellow card) 65'
MF	(Egypt) Islam Fathi
MF	(Egypt) Effat Nassar
FW	(Ghana) Joe Okyere	(substituted off) 46'
FW	(Ghana) Oscar Laud	(yellow card) 36'
Substitutes:
MF	(Egypt) Khaled El Ghandour	(substituted on) 46'
MF	(Egypt) Mohamed Sabry	(substituted on) 55'
Manager:
(Austria) Alfred Riedl

== Post-match ==
The final whistle prompted large celebrations inside Stade El Menzah and across Tunis, particularly in Bab Souika, the district traditionally associated with Espérance. The celebrations continued into the evening as the club secured the African title twenty-three years after its first appearance in the competition.

Hédi Berkhissa emerged as the central figure of the return leg. The 22-year-old, a product of Espérance's youth system and a law student at the time, scored the opening and third goals and was singled out by France Football for his energetic performance. The magazine described him in the aftermath of the final as a potential future star.

For Zamalek, the defeat ended their attempt to become the first club to win the African Cup of Champions Clubs four times. It was also the Egyptian club's first defeat in a final of the competition, having previously won each of its three appearances in 1984, 1986 and 1993.

As African champions, Espérance qualified for the 1995 CAF Super Cup, where they defeated African Cup Winners' Cup holders DC Motema Pembe 3–0 in Alexandria. They also represented Africa in the 1995 Afro-Asian Club Championship, defeating Thai Farmers Bank 4–1 on aggregate.
