= 1988 AFC Asian Cup squads =

Squad lists of 1988 AFC Asian Cup national teams

Squads for the 1988 AFC Asian Cup tournament in Qatar.

== Group A ==
=== Iran ===
Head coach: Parviz Dehdari

No.	Pos.	Player	Date of birth (age)	Caps	Club
1	GK	Ahmadreza Abedzadeh	25 May 1966 (aged 22)		(Iran) Jandarmeri
2	DF	Javad Zarincheh	23 July 1966 (aged 22)		(Iran) Esteghlal
4	DF	Nader Mohammadkhani	23 August 1963 (aged 25)		(Iran) Nirooye Zamini
5	DF	Morteza Fonounizadeh	21 February 1961 (aged 27)		(Iran) Persepolis
6	MF	Mehdi Fonounizadeh	19 May 1962 (aged 26)		(Iran) Daraei
7	MF	Majeed Namjoo Motlagh	13 May 1967 (aged 21)		(Iran) Esteghlal
8	MF	Sirous Ghayeghran	22 September 1962 (aged 26)		(Iran) Malavan
9	FW	Samad Marfavi	18 May 1965 (aged 23)		(Iran) Daraei
10	FW	Karim Bavi	30 December 1964 (aged 23)		(Iran) Persepolis
11	MF	Morteza Kermani Moghaddam	11 July 1965 (aged 23)		(Iran) Persepolis
13	DF	Mojtaba Moharrami	16 April 1962 (aged 26)		(Iran) Persepolis
14	MF	Mohammad Hassan Ansarifard	24 September 1961 (aged 27)		(Iran) Persepolis
17	FW	Mohammad Taghavi	8 January 1972 (aged 16)		(Iran) Homa
18	DF	Siamak Rahimpour	23 September 1963 (aged 25)		(Iran) Shahin F.C.
19	FW	Farshad Pious	12 January 1962 (aged 26)		(Iran) Persepolis
20	MF	Seyed Ali Eftekhari	29 July 1964 (aged 24)		(Iran) Esteghlal Rasht
21	MF	Zia Arabshahi	6 June 1958 (aged 30)		(Iran) Persepolis
22	GK	Ahmad Sajjadi	1 July 1960 (aged 28)		(Iran) Homa

=== Japan ===
Head coach: (Japan) Kenzo Yokoyama

No.	Pos.	Player	Date of birth (age)	Caps	Goals	Club
1	GK	Hisashi Tsuchida	1 February 1967 (aged 21)	0	0	(Japan Football Association) Osaka University of Economics
2	DF	Nobuhiro Ueno	26 August 1965 (aged 23)	0	0	(Japan Football Association) Waseda University
3	DF	Takumi Horiike	6 September 1965 (aged 23)	58	2	(Japan Football Association) Yomiuri FC
4	DF	Yoshinori Taguchi	14 September 1965 (aged 23)	0	0	(Japan Football Association) University of Tsukuba
5	DF	Yuji Sakakura	7 June 1967 (aged 21)	6	0	(Japan Football Association) Juntendo University
6	DF	Takeshi Motoyoshi	26 July 1967 (aged 21)	0	0	(Japan Football Association) Chuo University
7	DF	Masami Ihara	18 September 1967 (aged 21)	122	5	(Japan Football Association) University of Tsukuba
8	DF	Naoto Otake	18 October 1968 (aged 20)	1	0	(Japan Football Association) Juntendo University
9	MF	Hisanori Shirasawa	13 December 1964 (aged 23)	3	0	(Japan Football Association) Yanmar Diesel
10	MF	Katsumi Oenoki	3 April 1965 (aged 23)	5	0	(Japan Football Association) Yamaha
11	MF	Shunichi Ikenoue	16 February 1967 (aged 21)	0	0	(Japan Football Association) Osaka University of Commerce
12	MF	Masashi Nakayama	23 September 1967 (aged 21)	53	21	(Japan Football Association) University of Tsukuba
13	MF	Hisashi Kurosaki	8 May 1968 (aged 20)	24	4	(Japan Football Association) Honda
14	MF	Satoru Noda	8 June 1969 (aged 19)	0	0	(Japan Football Association) Kokushikan University
15	FW	Yusuke Minoguchi	23 August 1965 (aged 23)	0	0	(Japan Football Association) Furukawa Electric
16	FW	Osamu Maeda	5 September 1965 (aged 23)	14	6	(Japan Football Association) ANA SC
17	FW	Masahiro Sukigara	2 April 1966 (aged 22)	0	0	(Japan Football Association) University of Tsukuba
18	FW	Yoshiyuki Matsuyama	31 July 1966 (aged 22)	9	4	(Japan Football Association) Waseda University
19	GK	Masanori Sanada	6 March 1968 (aged 20)	0	0	(Japan Football Association) Juntendo University
20	FW	Takuya Takagi	12 November 1967 (aged 21)	44	27	(Japan Football Association) Osaka University of Commerce

- Caps & Goals listed are recognized career totals while all other stats are listed as they were on 2 December 1988 the tournament's opening day.

=== South Korea ===
Head coach: (South Korea) Lee Hoi-Taek

No.	Pos.	Player	Date of birth (age)	Caps	Club
1	GK	Cho Byung-deuk	26 May 1958 (aged 30)	34	(South Korea) POSCO Atoms
2	DF	Park Kyung-hoon	19 January 1961 (aged 27)	55	(South Korea) POSCO Atoms
3	DF	Choi Kang-hee	12 April 1959 (aged 29)	1	(South Korea) Hyundai Horangi
4	DF	Cho Min-kook	5 July 1963 (aged 25)	26	(South Korea) Lucky-Goldstar Hwangso
5	DF	Chung Yong-hwan	10 February 1960 (aged 28)	34	(South Korea) Daewoo Royals
6	FW	Lee Tae-ho	29 January 1961 (aged 27)	60	(South Korea) Daewoo Royals
7	MF	Noh Soo-jin	10 February 1962 (aged 26)	16	(South Korea) Yukong Elephants
8	MF	Chung Hae-won	1 July 1959 (aged 29)	44	(South Korea) Daewoo Royals
9	MF	Hwangbo Kwan	1 March 1965 (aged 23)	0	(South Korea) Yukong Elephants
10	FW	Ham Hyun-gi	26 April 1963 (aged 25)	1	(South Korea) Hyundai Horangi
11	FW	Byun Byung-joo	26 April 1961 (aged 27)	52	(South Korea) Daewoo Royals
12	FW	Kim Bong-gil	15 March 1966 (aged 22)	0	(South Korea) Yonsei University
13	DF	Cho Yoon-hwan	24 May 1961 (aged 27)	1	(South Korea) Yukong Elephants
14	FW	Hwang Sun-hong	14 July 1968 (aged 20)	0	(South Korea) Konkuk University
15	DF	Son Hyung-sun	22 February 1964 (aged 24)	0	(South Korea) Daewoo Royals
16	FW	Kim Joo-sung	17 January 1966 (aged 22)	25	(South Korea) Daewoo Royals
17	DF	Gu Sang-bum	15 June 1964 (aged 24)	4	(South Korea) Lucky-Goldstar Hwangso
18	DF	Kang Tae-sik	15 March 1963 (aged 25)	1	(South Korea) POSCO Atoms
19	MF	Yeo Bum-kyu	24 June 1962 (aged 26)	7	(South Korea) Daewoo Royals
20	GK	Kim Bong-soo	5 December 1970 (aged 17)	0	(South Korea) Korea University

=== Qatar ===
Head coach: (Brazil) Procópio Cardoso

No.	Pos.	Player	Date of birth (age)	Caps	Goals	Club
1	GK	Younes Ahmed	17 July 1963 (aged 25)			(Qatar Football Association) Al Rayyan
2	DF	Mohammed Al-Sowaidi	25 June 1962 (aged 26)			(Qatar Football Association) Al Rayyan
3	DF	Saad Salman				(Qatar Football Association)
4	DF	Yousef Al-Adsani	12 October 1965 (aged 23)			(Qatar Football Association) Al Sadd
5	DF	Adel Malallah	15 September 1961 (aged 27)			(Qatar Football Association) Al Ahli
6	DF	Sabaan Saalam Mubarak				(Qatar Football Association)
7	MF	Adel Khamis	11 November 1965 (aged 23)			(Qatar Football Association) Al Gharafa
8	MF	Mohammed Al Ammari	10 December 1965 (aged 22)			(Qatar Football Association) Al Sadd
9	DF	Ali Al-Kubaisi				(Qatar Football Association)
10	MF	Mubarak Salem Al-Khater	25 May 1966 (aged 22)			(Qatar Football Association) Al Rayyan
11	FW	Khalifa Al-Sulaiti				(Qatar Football Association) Al Sadd
12	FW	Mahmoud Soufi	20 October 1971 (aged 17)			(Qatar Football Association) Al Gharafa
13	MF	Adel Abu Karbal				(Qatar Football Association) Qatar SC
14	MF	Fahad Al Kuwari	19 December 1968 (aged 19)			(Qatar Football Association) Umm Salal
15	FW	Mansoor Muftah	22 November 1955 (aged 33)			(Qatar Football Association) Al Rayyan
16	FW	Khalid Salman	5 April 1963 (aged 25)			(Qatar Football Association) Al Sadd
17	MF	Mohamed Hassen Al-Buhaqab				(Qatar Football Association)
18	MF	Yousef Khalaf	7 April 1969 (aged 19)			(Qatar Football Association)
19	DF	Issa Al-Mohammadi	19 December 1963 (aged 24)			(Qatar Football Association) Al Ahli
20	DF	Ali Al-Sulaiti				(Qatar Football Association)
21	MF	Mohamed Al-Mohannadi	10 October 1967 (aged 21)			(Qatar Football Association) Al Ahli
22	GK	Ahmed Al-Majid	18 July 1962 (aged 26)			(Qatar Football Association) Al Arabi

=== United Arab Emirates ===
Head coach: (Brazil) Mario Zagallo

No.	Pos.	Player	Date of birth (age)	Caps	Goals	Club
17	GK	Muhsin Musabah	1 October 1964 (aged 24)			(United Arab Emirates Football Association) Al Sharjah SC
4	DF	Mubarak Ghanim	3 September 1963 (aged 25)			(United Arab Emirates Football Association) Al Khaleej Club
2	DF	Khalil Ghanim	12 November 1964 (aged 24)			(United Arab Emirates Football Association) Al Khaleej Club
15	DF	Ibrahim Meer	16 July 1967 (aged 21)			(United Arab Emirates Football Association) Al Sharjah SC
20	MF	Mohamed Obaid	1 August 1967 (aged 21)			(United Arab Emirates Football Association) Al Ain FC
5	MF	Abdullah Ali Sultan	1 October 1963 (aged 25)			(United Arab Emirates Football Association) Al Khaleej Club
6	DF	Abdulrahman Mohamed	1 October 1963 (aged 25)			(United Arab Emirates Football Association) Al-Nasr SC
13	MF	Hassan Mohamed	23 September 1962 (aged 26)			(United Arab Emirates Football Association) Al Wasl FC
12	MF	Hussain Ghuloum	24 September 1969 (aged 19)			(United Arab Emirates Football Association) Al Sharjah SC
7	FW	Fahad Khamees	24 January 1962 (aged 26)			(United Arab Emirates Football Association) Al Wasl FC
10	MF	Adnan Al-Talyani	30 October 1964 (aged 24)			(United Arab Emirates Football Association) Al-Shaab CSC
19	DF	Eissa Meer	16 July 1967 (aged 21)			(United Arab Emirates Football Association) Al Sharjah SC
16	DF	Mohamed Salim	13 January 1968 (aged 20)			(United Arab Emirates Football Association) Al Ahli Club
8	MF	Khalid Ismaïl	8 January 1965 (aged 23)			(United Arab Emirates Football Association) Al-Nasr SC
3	MF	Ali Thani Jumaa	18 September 1968 (aged 20)			(United Arab Emirates Football Association) Al Sharjah SC
11	FW	Zuhair Bakhit	13 August 1967 (aged 21)			(United Arab Emirates Football Association) Al Wasl FC
9	FW	Abdulaziz Mohamed	12 December 1965 (aged 22)			(United Arab Emirates Football Association) Al Sharjah SC

== Group B ==
=== Bahrain ===
Head coach: Mohammed Al Arabi

No.	Pos.	Player	Date of birth (age)	Caps	Club
1	GK	Humood Sultan	1 January 1956 (aged 32)		(Bahrain) Al-Muharraq SC
2	DF	Abdul Razzaq Abbas	3 October 1969 (aged 19)		(Bahrain)
4	MF	Hamad Al-Jazaf	22 January 1969 (aged 19)		(Bahrain) Isa Town FC
5	DF	Adnan Daif			(Bahrain) Al-Muharraq SC
6	DF	Juma Hilal	21 October 1968 (aged 20)		(Bahrain) Al Wahda
7	MF	Nasser Jassim Mohammed			(Bahrain)
9	FW	Ebrahim Essa Ahmed			(Bahrain)
10	FW	Abdul Aziz Froutan			(Bahrain)
11	FW	Shaker Salman			(Bahrain)
14	MF	Ali Hassan Yousif			(Bahrain)
15	DF	Khamis Eid	11 June 1967 (aged 21)		(Bahrain) West Riffa SC
16	DF	Hassan Khalfan			(Qatar) Al-Wakrah SC
17	MF	Fayad Mahmoud			(Bahrain) Al Wahda
19	MF	Najaf Mohammed			(Bahrain)
20	MF	Ali Mohammad Al-Ansari			(Bahrain)
21	GK	Abdulrahman Hassan			(Bahrain)

=== China ===
Head coach: Gao Fengwen

No.	Pos.	Player	Date of birth (age)	Caps	Club
1	GK	Kong Guoxian	6 September 1965 (aged 23)		(China) Guangzhou
2	DF	Zhu Bo	24 September 1960 (aged 28)		(China) Bayi
3	DF	Gao Sheng	10 May 1962 (aged 26)		(China) Liaoning
4	DF	Guo Yijun	23 September 1963 (aged 25)		(China) Guangdong
7	MF	Xie Yuxin	12 December 1963 (aged 24)		(Netherlands) FC Zwolle
8	MF	Tang Yaodong	17 February 1962 (aged 26)		(China) Liaoning
10	FW	Ma Lin	28 July 1962 (aged 26)		(China) Liaoning
11	MF	Wu Wenbing	13 November 1967 (aged 21)		(China) Guangdong
12	FW	Wang Baoshan	13 April 1963 (aged 25)		(China) Shaanxi
13	MF	Lianzhi Shi	3 June 1964 (aged 24)		(China) Tianjin
14	MF	Zhai Biao	14 September 1968 (aged 20)		(China) Beijing
15	DF	Zhang Xiaowen	15 July 1964 (aged 24)		(China) Guangdong
16	FW	Huang Chong	28 February 1963 (aged 25)		(China) Liaoning
17	MF	Mai Chao	9 March 1964 (aged 24)		(China) Guangzhou
18	MF	Duan Ju	3 October 1963 (aged 25)		(China) Tianjin
19	DF	Dong Liqiang	20 August 1965 (aged 23)		(China) Liaoning
20	GK	Zhang Huikang	22 July 1962 (aged 26)		(China) Shanghai
21	MF	Tu Shengqiao	9 October 1968 (aged 20)		China B

=== Kuwait ===
Head coach: (Brazil) Miguel Pereira

No.	Pos.	Player	Date of birth (age)	Caps	Goals	Club
1	GK	Samir Said	5 November 1963 (aged 25)			(Kuwait Football Association) Al-Arabi SC
3	DF	Mahboub Juma'a	17 September 1955 (aged 33)			(Kuwait Football Association) Al-Salmiya SC
4	DF	Jamal Al-Qabendi	7 April 1959 (aged 29)			(Kuwait Football Association) Kazma SC
2	DF	Naeem Saad	10 January 1957 (aged 31)			(Kuwait Football Association) Al Tadamun SC
6	MF	Wael Sulaiman	24 August 1964 (aged 24)			(Kuwait Football Association) Al Jahra SC
5	DF	Waleed Al-Jasem	18 November 1959 (aged 29)			(Kuwait Football Association) Kuwait SC
11	MF	Nasser Al-Ghanim	4 April 1961 (aged 27)			(Kuwait Football Association) Kazma SC
16	MF	Mansour Mohammad Basha	3 September 1970 (aged 18)			(Kuwait Football Association) Al-Arabi SC
12	MF	Abdulaziz Al-Hajeri				(Kuwait Football Association) Al-Fahaheel FC
10	MF	Nawaf Al-Anezi				(Kuwait Football Association)
9	FW	Salah Al-Hasawi	1963 (aged 25)			(Kuwait Football Association) Kuwait SC
20	GK	Khaled Al-Shemmari	1963 (aged 23)			(Kuwait Football Association) Kazma SC
13	MF	Adil Abbas				(Kuwait Football Association) Kuwait SC
18	DF	Mubarak Al-Essa	1 January 1961 (aged 27)			(Kuwait Football Association) Al Tadamun SC
17	FW	Anbar Saeed				(Kuwait Football Association) Al-Arabi SC
15	MF	Tariq Salim				(Kuwait Football Association) Al Tadamun SC
7	FW	Fahed Kameel Marzouq	2 January 1971 (aged 17)			(Kuwait Football Association) Al Tadamun SC
8	FW	Saleh Al-Refae				(Kuwait Football Association) Kazma SC

=== Saudi Arabia ===
Head coach: (Brazil) Carlos Alberto Parreira

No.	Pos.	Player	Date of birth (age)	Caps	Goals	Club
1	GK	Abdullah Al-Deayea	1 December 1961 (aged 27)			(Saudi Arabian Football Federation) Al-Ta'ee
2	DF	Abdullah Al-Dosari	1 November 1969 (aged 19)			(Saudi Arabian Football Federation) Al-Ettifaq
3	DF	Hussein Al-Bishi	13 June 1961 (aged 27)			(Saudi Arabian Football Federation) Al-Hilal FC
4	DF	Ahmad Jamil Madani	6 January 1970 (aged 18)			(Saudi Arabian Football Federation) Ittihad FC
5	DF	Saleh Al-Nu'eimeh (C)	24 June 1957 (aged 31)			(Saudi Arabian Football Federation) Al-Hilal FC
6	MF	Saleh Al-Mutlaq	3 January 1966 (aged 22)			(Saudi Arabian Football Federation) Al Nassr FC
7	FW	Yousuf Jazea'a Al-Dosari	13 October 1968 (aged 20)			(Saudi Arabian Football Federation) Al-Hilal FC
8	MF	Fahad Al-Bishi	10 September 1965 (aged 23)			(Saudi Arabian Football Federation) Al Nassr FC
9	FW	Majed Abdullah	1 November 1959 (aged 29)			(Saudi Arabian Football Federation) Al Nassr FC
10	MF	Fahad Al-Musaibeah	4 April 1961 (aged 27)			(Saudi Arabian Football Federation) Al-Hilal FC
11	FW	Mohaisen Al-Jam'an	1 January 1966 (aged 22)			(Saudi Arabian Football Federation) Al Nassr FC
12	DF	Zaki Al-Saleh	22 November 1970 (aged 18)			(Saudi Arabian Football Federation) Al-Ettifaq
13	DF	Mohamed Al-Jawad	28 November 1962 (aged 26)			(Saudi Arabian Football Federation) Al-Ahli SC
14	MF	Khaled Al-Muwallid	23 November 1971 (aged 17)			(Saudi Arabian Football Federation) Al-Ahli SC
15	MF	Yousuf Al-Thunayan	18 November 1963 (aged 25)			(Saudi Arabian Football Federation) Al-Hilal FC
16	DF	Tariq Al-Awadi				(Saudi Arabian Football Federation) Al-Hilal FC
17	FW	Saad Mubarak Al-Dosari	1965 (aged 23)			(Saudi Arabian Football Federation) Al-Hilal FC
19	FW	Mohamed Al-Suwaiyed	1964 (aged 24)			(Saudi Arabian Football Federation) Ittihad FC
21	GK	Saud Al-Otaibi	3 November 1969 (aged 19)			(Saudi Arabian Football Federation) Al-Shabab
22	GK	Khaled Al-Sabyani				(Saudi Arabian Football Federation) Al Nassr FC

=== Syria ===
Head coach: (Soviet Union) Anatoliy Azarenkov

No.	Pos.	Player	Date of birth (age)	Caps	Goals	Club
1	GK	Ahmad Eid Berakdar	1 May 1955 (aged 33)			(Syrian Football Association) Al-Karamah SC
2	DF	Adnan Sabouni	13 November 1961 (aged 27)			(Syrian Football Association) Al-Ittihad SC
3	DF	Ammar Habib	25 October 1967 (aged 21)			(Syrian Football Association) Tishreen SC
4	DF	Yousef Hawla				(Syrian Football Association) Tishreen SC
7	MF	Walid Abou El-Sel	1963 (aged 25)			(Syrian Football Association) Al-Jaish SC
8	MF	Abdul Kader Kardaghli	1 January 1961 (aged 27)			(Syrian Football Association) Tishreen SC
9	FW	Nizar Mahrous	12 March 1963 (aged 25)			(Syrian Football Association) Al-Wahda SC
10	FW	Faisal Ahmad				(Syrian Football Association) Al-Majd
11	MF	Saad Saad				(Syrian Football Association)
13	DF	Abdullah Saddikah	18 November 1971 (aged 17)			(Syrian Football Association)
14	MF	Mohammad Jakalan	1961 (aged 27)			(Syrian Football Association) Al-Ittihad SC
15	MF	George Khouri	1962 (aged 26)			(Syrian Football Association) Al-Jaish SC
16	FW	Munaf Ramadan	19 October 1972 (aged 16)			(Syrian Football Association) Jableh SC
17	DF	Samer Darwish				(Syrian Football Association) Al-Wahda SC
18	FW	Walid Al-Nasser	18 June 1965 (aged 23)			(Syrian Football Association) Hurriya SC
19	DF	Joseph Leyous				(Syrian Football Association) Hurriya SC
20	MF	Radwan Ajam	1965 (aged 23)			(Syrian Football Association) Al-Karamah SC
22	GK	Malek Shakuhi	5 April 1960 (aged 28)			(Syrian Football Association) Jableh SC
23	FW	Shadi Gilke				(Syrian Football Association)
