= Tunisia national football team records and statistics =

The Tunisia national football team has played teams from every confederation. Their first international match was played on 2 June 1957 in Tunis against Libya, winning 4–2. The team they have played the most is Morocco, with a total of 50 matches played. Their biggest win has been by 8 goals in two matches: against Chinese Taipei on 18 August 1960, and against Djibouti on 12 June 2015.

== Player records ==
As of 17 November 2026
Players in bold are still active with Tunisia. Includes only statistics recognized by FIFA.

=== Most appearances ===
Rank	Player	Caps	Goals	Career
1	Radhi Jaïdi	105	7	1996–2009
1	**Ferjani Sassi**	105	9	2013–present
3	Youssef Msakni	104	23	2010–2024
4	**Ali Maâloul**	98	3	2013–present
5	Chokri El Ouaer	97	0	1990–2002
6	Khaled Badra	96	10	1995–2006
7	Khaled Ben Yahia	95	5	1979–1993
7	Kaies Ghodhbane	95	6	1995–2006
7	Yassine Meriah	95	6	2015–2026
10	Riadh Bouazizi	92	4	1995–2006

=== Top goalscorers ===
Rank	Player	Goals	Caps	Ratio	Career
1	Issam Jemâa (list)	36	84	0.43	2005–2014
2	Wahbi Khazri	25	74	0.34	2013–2022
3	Youssef Msakni	23	104	0.22	2010–2024
4	Francileudo Santos	22	41	0.54	2004–2008
5	Adel Sellimi	20	80	0.25	1991–2002
6	Faouzi Rouissi	18	57	0.32	1989–2001
7	Zoubeir Baya	17	83	0.2	1994–2002
7	Mohamed Ali Mahjoubi	17	86	0.2	1985–1995
9	Mohamed Akid	16	50	0.32	1967–1978
9	Naïm Sliti	16	85	0.19	2016–2026

== All−time record against FIFA recognized nations ==
The list shown below shows the Tunisia national football team all−time international record against opposing nations.

Key

Positive balance (more wins than losses)
Neutral balance (as many wins as losses)
Negative balance (more losses than wins)

Tunisia national football team head-to-head records
Against	Pld	W	D	L	GF	GA	GD	Confederation
Algeria	48	14	16	18	40	50	−10	CAF
Angola	7	3	4	0	15	5	+10	CAF
Argentina	1	0	0	1	1	2	−1	CONMEBOL
Australia	3	1	0	2	2	4	−2	AFC
Austria	4	0	1	3	2	6	−4	UEFA
Bahrain	2	1	0	1	3	1	+2	AFC
Belarus	1	1	0	0	3	0	+3	UEFA
Belgium	5	1	1	3	5	13	−8	UEFA
Benin	9	6	3	0	24	6	+18	CAF
Bosnia and Herzegovina	1	1	0	0	2	1	+1	UEFA
Botswana	10	5	3	2	16	8	+8	CAF
Brazil	3	0	1	2	3	10	−7	CONMEBOL
Bulgaria	2	1	1	0	6	3	+3	UEFA
Burkina Faso	8	2	3	3	9	8	+1	CAF
Burundi	3	3	0	0	5	2	+3	CAF
Cameroon	18	2	7	9	18	29	−11	CAF
Canada	2	1	1	0	2	0	+2	CONCACAF
Cape Verde	4	3 (Note: FIFA awarded Tunisia a 3–0 win as a result of Cape Verde fielding the player Fernando Varela, who had been sent off in the match against Equatorial Guinea on 24 March 2013. As a result of his sending off for unsporting conduct towards a match official, Varela had been given a four match suspension and would miss the rest of the qualifying campaign plus one further FIFA game. Varela did not participate in the games against Equatorial Guinea on 8 June 2013 or the game against Sierra Leone on 16 June 2013. Complicating matters, Varela's red card against Equatorial Guinea was removed from the FIFA.com website. The match originally ended 2–0 to Cape Verde.)	1	0	7	2	+5	CAF
Central African Republic	1	1	0	0	3	0	+3	CAF
Chad	4	3	1	0	10	2	+8	CAF
Chile	2	1	0	1	4	3	+1	CONMEBOL
China	4	1	2	1	3	3	0	AFC
Chinese Taipei	1	1	0	0	8	1	+7	AFC
Comoros	3	1	1	1	2	2	0	CAF
Colombia	2	0	1	1	1	2	−1	CONMEBOL
Congo	9	6	2	1	17	6	+11	CAF
Costa Rica	1	1	0	0	1	0	+1	CONCACAF
Croatia	2	1	1	0	2	1	+1	UEFA
Denmark	3	0	1	2	2	5	−3	UEFA
Djibouti	2	2	0	0	11	1	+10	CAF
DR Congo (Note: Includes matches against Zaire)	14	7	4	3	25	13	+12	CAF
East Germany	5	1	0	4	1	11	−10	UEFA
Egypt	41	18	10	13	47	38	+9	CAF
England	3	0	1	2	2	5	−3	UEFA
Equatorial Guinea	11	7	1	3	17	7	+10	CAF
Ethiopia	8	4	2	2	17	11	+6	CAF
Finland	3	0	1	2	2	6	−4	UEFA
France	5	1	2	2	4	7	−3	UEFA
Gabon	11	4	6	1	21	12	+9	CAF
Gambia	4	1	0	3	3	5	−2	CAF
Georgia	2	0	1	1	1	3	−2	UEFA
Germany (Note: Includes matches against West Germany.)	3	0	2	1	1	4	−3	UEFA
Ghana	18 (Note: The two teams play on January 18, 2000 a training match, three halves of 35 minutes, won by Ghana 2–0 but which can not be considered a real international match.)	4	5	9	20	27	−7	CAF
Guinea	20	9	4	7	31	19	+12	CAF
Guinea-Bissau	1	1	0	0	3	1	+2	CAF
Haiti	1	1	0	0	1	0	+1	CONCACAF
Hungary	4	0	1	3	3	16	−13	UEFA
Iceland	1	1	0	0	3	1	+2	UEFA
India	1	0	1	0	2	2	0	AFC
Iran	3	2	1	0	5	2	+3	AFC
Iraq	11	7	3	1	19	10	+9	AFC
Republic of Ireland	1	0	0	1	0	4	−4	UEFA
Italy	1	0	0	1	0	4	−4	UEFA
Ivory Coast	19	6	6	7	27	29	−2	CAF
Japan	7	1	0	6	3	12	−9	AFC
Jordan	4	3	1	0	15	5	+10	AFC
Kenya	7	5	1	1	10	3	+7	CAF
Kuwait	4	3	0	1	8	4	+4	AFC
Latvia	1	1	0	0	3	0	+3	UEFA
Lebanon	5	3	1	1	9	5	+4	AFC
Liberia	12	7	2	3	21	9	+12	CAF
Libya	31	19	4	8	55	36	+19	CAF
Madagascar	7	6	0	1	12	6	+6	CAF
Malawi	9	4	3	2	19	8	+11	CAF
Mali	16	7	4	5	16	12	+4	CAF
Malta	12	4	4	4	13	9	+4	UEFA
Mauritania	17	11	6	0	30	6	+24	CAF
Mauritius	2	1	1	0	2	0	+2	CAF
Mexico	1	1	0	0	3	1	+2	CONCACAF
Morocco	51	9	28	14	46	55	−9	CAF
Mozambique	3	1	1	1	3	2	+1	CAF
Namibia	6	4	1	1	11	2	+9	CAF
Netherlands	4	0	2	2	4	10	−6	UEFA
New Zealand	1	0	1	0	0	0	0	OFC
Niger	4	4	0	0	9	4	+5	CAF
Nigeria	21	7	7	7	27	22	+5	CAF
Norway	2	0	1	1	1	3	−2	UEFA
Oman	3	1	1	1	3	3	0	AFC
Palestine	3	1	2	0	9	5	+4	AFC
Panama	1	1	0	0	2	1	+1	CONCACAF
Peru	1	0	1	0	1	1	0	CONMEBOL
Poland	4	1	0	3	2	9	−7	UEFA
Portugal	2	0	2	0	3	3	0	UEFA
Qatar	4	2	0	2	8	3	+5	AFC
Romania	1	0	1	0	1	1	0	UEFA
Russia (Note: Includes matches against the Soviet Union.)	2	0	0	2	0	5	−5	UEFA
Rwanda	6	6	0	0	18	3	+15	CAF
São Tomé and Príncipe	2	2	0	0	10	0	+10	CAF
Saudi Arabia	7	3	2	2	7	6	+1	AFC
Senegal	21	9	7	5	22	13	+9	CAF
Serbia (Note: Includes matches against Yugoslavia and Serbia and Montenegro)	6	1	0	5	3	22	−19	UEFA
Seychelles	4	4	0	0	14	0	+14	CAF
Sierra Leone	7	3	3	1	10	6	+4	CAF
Slovenia	2	0	1	1	2	3	−1	UEFA
Somalia	1	1	0	0	2	1	+1	CAF
South Africa	7	3	2	2	9	7	+2	CAF
South Korea	3	1	1	1	1	4	−3	AFC
Spain	2	0	0	2	1	4	−3	UEFA
Sudan	11	8	0	3	28	11	+17	CAF
Sweden	5	1	1	3	3	8	−5	UEFA
Switzerland	3	0	1	2	2	4	−2	UEFA
Eswatini	2	2	0	0	6	0	+6	CAF
Syria	12	5	1	6	16	15	+1	AFC
Tanzania	2	1	1	0	2	1	+1	CAF
Togo	10	7	3	0	19	4	+15	CAF
Turkey	6	0	5	1	4	7	−3	UEFA
Uganda	7	6	1	0	20	3	+17	CAF
Ukraine	1	0	0	1	0	1	−1	UEFA
United Arab Emirates	5	5	0	0	10	1	+9	AFC
United States	1	0	1	0	1	1	0	CONCACAF
Uruguay	1	0	1	0	0	0	0	CONMEBOL
Wales	1	1	0	0	4	0	+4	UEFA
Yemen (Note: Includes matches against North Yemen)	1	1	0	0	2	0	+2	AFC
Zambia	14	9	2	3	24	13	+11	CAF
Zimbabwe	2	1	1	0	5	3	+2	CAF
Total	754	324	211	219	1075	794	+281	—
Last match updated was against Libya on 17 November 2026

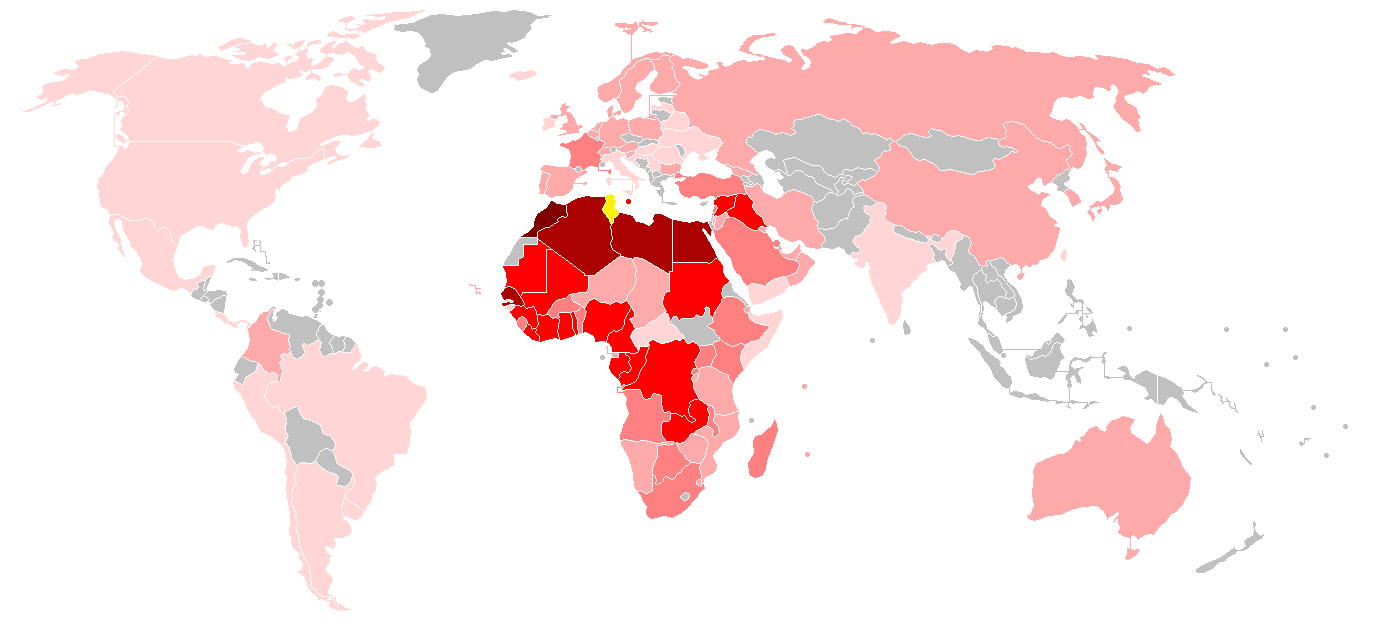
Map of teams played against Tunisia by number of matches: (Note: The map updated after the Tunisia v Tanzania match of 17 November 2020 for the Group J of the 2021 Africa Cup of Nations qualification. The matches against Germany and West Germany are combined.): 1 Match 2–4 Matches / 5–9 Matches 10–20 Matches / 20–49 Matches +50 Matches

== Match statistics ==
=== Biggest wins ===
Rank	Date	Venue	Opponent	Score	Competition	Difference
1	18 August 1960	Stadio Olimpico, Rome, Italy	Chinese Taipei	8–1	Friendly match	+7
2	12 June 2015	Radès Olympic Stadium, Tunis, Tunisia	Djibouti	8–1	2017 Africa Cup of Nations qualification	+7
3	7 January 2000	El Menzah Stadium, Tunis, Tunisia	Togo	7–0	Friendly match	+7
4	26 March 2005	Radès Olympic Stadium, Tunis, Tunisia	Malawi	7–0	2006 FIFA World Cup qualification	+7
5	25 February 2001	El Menzah Stadium, Tunis, Tunisia	DR Congo	6–0	2002 FIFA World Cup qualification	+6
6	1 July 2001	El Menzah Stadium, Tunis, Tunisia	Congo	6–0	2002 FIFA World Cup qualification	+6
7	10 October 2025	Hammadi Agrebi Stadium, Tunis, Tunisia	São Tomé and Príncipe	6–0	2026 FIFA World Cup qualification	+6

=== Biggest defeats ===
Rank	Date	Venue	Opponent	Score	Competition	Difference
1	24 July 1960	Népstadion, Budapest, Hungary	Hungary	1–10	Friendly match	+9

== Hat-tricks ==
No.	Date	Goals	Player	Opponent	Venue	Competition	Score	Refs.
1	18 August 1960	3	Moncef Chérif	Taiwan	Stadio Olimpico, Rome, Italy	Friendly match	8–1	
2	7 June 1964	4	Taoufik Ben Othman	Turkey	El Menzah Stadium, Tunis, Tunisia	Friendly match	4–1	
3	5 June 1972	3	Mohamed Akid	Algeria	El Menzah Stadium, Tunis, Tunisia	Friendly match	3–1	
4	13 August 1973	3	Mohieddine Habita	Syria	Tripoli Stadium, Tripoli, Libya	1973 Palestine Cup of Nations	4–1	
5	21 August 1973	3	Mohamed Akid	Palestine	Tripoli Stadium, Tripoli, Libya	1973 Palestine Cup of Nations	6–2	
6	17 January 1993	3	Faouzi Rouissi	Benin	L'Amitié Stadium, Cotonou, Benin	1994 FIFA World Cup qualification	5–0	
7	31 January 1998	3	Hassen Gabsi	Guinea	El Menzah Stadium, Tunis, Tunisia	Friendly match	4–1	
8	30 December 2001	3	Jamel Zabi	Liberia	El Menzah Stadium, Tunis, Tunisia	Friendly match	7–2	
9	26 March 2005	4	Francileudo Santos	Malawi	Radès Olympic Stadium, Tunis, Tunisia	2006 FIFA World Cup qualification	7–0	
10	22 January 2006	3	Francileudo Santos	Zambia	Haras El Hodoud Stadium, Alexandria, Egypt	2006 African Cup of Nations	4–1	
11	24 March 2007	3	Issam Jemâa	Seychelles	Stade Linité, Victoria, Seychelles	2008 Africa Cup of Nations qualification	3–0	
12	5 June 2011	3	Issam Jemâa	Chad	Sousse Olympic Stadium, Sousse, Tunisia	2012 Africa Cup of Nations qualification	5–0	
13	4 September 2016	3	Yassine Chikhaoui	Djibouti	Radès Olympic Stadium, Tunis, Tunisia	2017 Africa Cup of Nations qualification	8–1	
14	7 October 2017	3	Youssef Msakni	Guinea	28 September Stadium, Conakry, Guinea	2018 FIFA World Cup qualification	4–1	

== FIFA rankings ==
Tunisia's FIFA ranking has ranged from 65th in July 2010 to 14th in April 2018. Continentally, they were the top African team in the FIFA world rankings between July 2001 and January 2002, and between January and December 2018. They were outside the top 10 African teams between July and August 2010. Below is a graph of Tunisia's FIFA rankings since 1993.

Best Ranking Worst Ranking Best Mover Worst Mover

Tunisia's FIFA world rankings
Rank	Year	Statistics				Best		Worst	
Rank	Year	Games	Wins	Draws	Loses	Rank	Move	Rank	Move
32	1993	10	6	3	1	31	▲7 (August)	36	▼3 (September)
30	1994	10	3	5	2	27	▲4 (September)	33	▼3 (October)
22	1995	14	7	3	4	21	▲6 (February)	27	▼4 (August)
23	1996	14	7	2	5	21	▲6 (February)	31	▼9 (June)
23	1997	14	9	2	3	20	▲7 (August)	29	▼4 (June)
21	1998	17	7	4	6	19	▲6 (November)	26	▼4 (July)
31	1999	10	7	1	2	26	▲4 (November)	33	▼7 (June)
26	2000	17	8	7	2	25	▲3 (June)	28	▼1 (September)
28	2001	12	8	2	2	22	▲7 (July)	32	▼5 (April)
41	2002	14	0	8	6	28	▲0 (June)	41	▼5 (July)
45	2003	9	5	3	1	40	▲3 (April)	46	▼3 (October)
35	2004	16	8	4	4	31	▲14 (February)	45	▼2 (April)
28	2005	12	8	2	2	23	▲8 (September)	40	▼4 (October)
32	2006	16	7	4	5	21	▲5 (February)	32	▼10 (July)
47	2007	9	5	3	1	32	▲5 (July)	47	▼13 (February)
46	2008	16	7	5	4	44	▲3 (April)	56	▼7 (February)
53	2009	10	4	4	2	45	▲2 (July)	54	▼8 (February)
45	2010	11	3	5	3	44	▲11 (October)	65	▼10 (July)
59	2011	8	4	2	2	44	▲3 (March)	61	▼15 (April)
45	2012	16	8	4	4	41	▲10 (June)	59	▼4 (October)
48	2013	15	4	7	4	41	▲11 (February)	53	▼8 (June)
22	2014	9	5	3	1	22	▲11 (September)	49	▼5 (April)
40	2015	15	5	5	5	22	▲2 (June)	41	▼5 (April)
35	2016	11	6	4	1	34	▲4 (October)	48	▼8 (February)
27	2017	13	6	2	5	27	▲7 (July)	42	▼5 (April)
24	2018	8	3	2	3	14	▲9 (April)	24	▼7 (June)
27	2019	17	8	5	4	25	▲3 (June)	28	▼4 (July)
26	2020	4	2	2	0	26	▲1 (September)	27	0 (December)
30	2021	17	12	1	4	25	▲3 (December)	30	▼4 (November)
30	2022	16	8	3	5	30	▲5 (June)	36	▼6 (February)
28	2023	10	6	1	3	28	▲4 (November)	32	▼3 (October)
52	2024	15	5	7	3	36	▲5 (September)	52	▼13 (February)
41	2025	18	11	4	3	40	▲3 (April)	49	▼1 (December)
