= List of Tunisia national football team hat-tricks =

Since Tunisia's first international association football match on 2 June 1957 against Libya, there have been 14 occasions when a Tunisian player has scored three or more goals (a hat-trick) in a game. The first hat-trick was scored by Moncef Chérif against Chinese Taipei on 18 August 1960.

== List ==
No.	Date	Goals	Player	Opponent	Venue	Competition	Score	Refs.
1	18 August 1960	3	Moncef Chérif	Taiwan	Stadio Olimpico, Rome, Italy	Friendly match	8–1	
2	7 June 1964	4	Taoufik Ben Othman	Turkey	El Menzah Stadium, Tunis, Tunisia	Friendly match	4–1	
3	5 June 1972	3	Mohamed Akid	Algeria	El Menzah Stadium, Tunis, Tunisia	Friendly match	3–1	
4	13 August 1973	3	Mohieddine Habita	Syria	Tripoli Stadium, Tripoli, Libya	1973 Palestine Cup of Nations	4–1	
5	21 August 1973	3	Mohamed Akid	Palestine	Tripoli Stadium, Tripoli, Libya	1973 Palestine Cup of Nations	6–2	
6	17 January 1993	3	Faouzi Rouissi	Benin	L'Amitié Stadium, Cotonou, Benin	1994 FIFA World Cup qualification	5–0	
7	31 January 1998	3	Hassen Gabsi	Guinea	El Menzah Stadium, Tunis, Tunisia	Friendly match	4–1	
8	30 December 2001	3	Jamel Zabi	Liberia	El Menzah Stadium, Tunis, Tunisia	Friendly match	7–2	
9	26 March 2005	4	Francileudo Santos	Malawi	Radès Olympic Stadium, Tunis, Tunisia	2006 FIFA World Cup qualification	7–0	
10	22 January 2006	3	Francileudo Santos	Zambia	Haras El Hodoud Stadium, Alexandria, Egypt	2006 African Cup of Nations	4–1	
11	24 March 2007	3	Issam Jemâa	Seychelles	Stade Linité, Victoria, Seychelles	2008 Africa Cup of Nations qualification	3–0	
12	5 June 2011	3	Issam Jemâa	Chad	Sousse Olympic Stadium, Sousse, Tunisia	2012 Africa Cup of Nations qualification	5–0	
13	4 September 2016	3	Yassine Chikhaoui	Djibouti	Radès Olympic Stadium, Tunis, Tunisia	2017 Africa Cup of Nations qualification	8–1	
14	7 October 2017	3	Youssef Msakni	Guinea	28 September Stadium, Conakry, Guinea	2018 FIFA World Cup qualification	4–1	

== See also ==
- List of leading goalscorers for the Tunisia national football team
