= List of leading goalscorers for the Tunisia national football team =

This is a list of leading goalscorers for the Tunisia national football team, featuring the players who have scored at least 10 goals. The Tunisian national team is the official representative of Tunisia in men's international association football competitions. It is governed by the Tunisian Football Federation and competes as a member of the Confederation of African Football. Issam Jemâa is the team's all-time top scorer with 36 goals.

== List ==
As of 17 November 2026

Key
| Still active with the national team. |

Tunisia national football team players with at least 10 goals
| No. | Player | Pos. | Career | Goals | Caps | Ratio | Refs. |
|---|---|---|---|---|---|---|---|
| 1 | Issam Jemâa | FW | 2005–2014 | 36 | 84 | 0.43 | |
| 2 | Wahbi Khazri | FW | 2013–2022 | 25 | 74 | 0.34 | |
| 3 | Youssef Msakni | FW | 2010–2024 | 23 | 104 | 0.22 | |
| 4 | Francileudo Santos | FW | 2004–2008 | 22 | 41 | 0.54 | |
| 5 | Adel Sellimi | FW | 1991–2002 | 20 | 80 | 0.25 | |
| 6 | Faouzi Rouissi | MF | 1989–2001 | 18 | 57 | 0.32 | |
| 7 | Zoubeir Baya | MF | 1994–2002 | 17 | 83 | 0.21 | |
| 8 | Mohamed Ali Mahjoubi | DF | 1985–1995 | 17 | 86 | 0.2 | |
| 9 | Mohamed Akid | FW | 1967–1978 | 16 | 50 | 0.32 | |
| 10 | Naïm Sliti | FW | 2016–2026 | 16 | 85 | 0.17 | |
| 11 | Mohamed Salah Jedidi | FW | 1962–1965 | 15 | 32 | 0.47 | |
| 12 | Mohieddine Habita | FW | 1972–1980 | 14 | 25 | 0.56 | |
| 13 | Ali Zitouni | FW | 1999–2009 | 14 | 46 | 0.3 | |
| 14 | Ziad Jaziri | FW | 1999–2007 | 14 | 63 | 0.22 | |
| 15 | Bassem Jeridi | FW | 1980–1989 | 13 | 40 | 0.33 | |
| 16 | Hassen Gabsi | MF | 1997–2002 | 13 | 51 | 0.25 | |
| 17 | Abdelkader Rakbaoui | FW | 1983–1988 | 12 | 28 | 0.43 | |
| 18 | Imed Mhedhebi | FW | 1999–2005 | 12 | 56 | 0.21 | |
| 19 | Tarak Dhiab | MF | 1974–1990 | 12 | 89 | 0.13 | |
| 20 | Ezzeddine Chakroun | FW | 1968–1978 | 11 | 32 | 0.34 | |
| 21 | Seifeddine Jaziri | FW | 2016–present | 11 | 44 | 0.25 | |
| 22 | Yassine Chikhaoui | MF | 2006–2021 | 10 | 42 | 0.24 | |
| 23 | Oussema Darragi | MF | 2008–2013 | 10 | 45 | 0.22 | |
| 24 | Témime Lahzami | FW | 1972–1980 | 10 | 51 | 0.2 | |
| 25 | Khaled Badra | DF | 1995–2006 | 10 | 96 | 0.1 | |

== See also ==
- List of Tunisia national football team hat-tricks
- List of Tunisia international footballers
