= List of Tunisia international footballers =

This is a list of Tunisia international footballers, which includes the names of the most prominent Tunisian national football team players who participated in at least 80 international matches. The Tunisian national team is the official representative of Tunisia in men's international association football competitions. It is governed by the Tunisian Football Federation and competes as a member of the Confederation of African Football. Radhi Jaïdi and Ferjani Sassi ate the team's most capped players, with 105 international appearances.

== List ==
As of 17 November 2026

Key
Still active with the national team.

Tunisia national football team players with at least 80 appearances
No.	Player	Caps	Goals	Debut match		Last or most recent match		Ref.
No.	Player	Caps	Goals	Date	Opponent	Date	Opponent	Ref.
1	Radhi Jaïdi	105	7	2 June 1996	Rwanda	20 June 2009	Nigeria	
2	Ferjani Sassi	105	9	8 June 2013	Sierra Leone	17 November 2026	Libya	
3	Youssef Msakni	104	23	9 January 2010	Gambia	15 October 2024	Comoros	
4	Ali Maâloul	98	3	6 July 2013	Morocco	17 November 2026	Libya	
5	Chokri El Ouaer	97	0	9 August 1990	Morocco	27 Mars 2002	Norway	
6	Khaled Badra	96	10	27 October 1995	Burkina Faso	7 October 2006	Sudan	
7	Khaled Ben Yahia	95	5	29 June 1980	Nigeria	10 January 1993	Bulgaria	
8	Kaies Ghodhbane	95	6	23 December 1995	Zambia	23 June 2006	Ukraine	
9	Yassine Meriah	95	6	9 October 2015	Gabon	3 January 2026	Mali	
10	Riadh Bouazizi	92	3	23 December 1995	Zambia	23 June 2006	Ukraine	
11	Tarak Dhiab	89	12	15 July 1974	Iran	2 June 1990	England	
12	Sadok Sassi	87	0	24 November 1963	Ghana	5 April 1978	Netherlands	
13	Mohamed Ali Mahjoubi	86	17	8 December 1985	Poland	14 April 1995	Egypt	
14	Ellyes Skhiri	86	4	23 March 2018	Iran	25 June 2026	Netherlands	
15	Naïm Sliti	85	16	3 June 2016	Djibouti	30 December 2025	Tanzania	
16	Sirajeddine Chihi	85	4	27 November 1991	Ivory Coast	28 November 2001	Togo	
17	Issam Jemâa	84	36	27 May 2005	Angola	10 October 2014	Senegal	
18	Zoubeir Baya	82	17	16 December 1994	Algeria	14 June 2002	Japan	
19	Karim Haggui	82	5	20 August 2003	Guinea	17 November 2013	Cameroon	
20	Adel Sellimi	80	20	7 November 1990	Norway	14 June 2002	Japan	

== See also ==
- List of Tunisia international footballers born outside Tunisia
- List of leading goalscorers for the Tunisia national football team
