= 1997 LG Cup (Tunisia) =

Tournament details
- Host country: Tunisia
- City: Tunis
- Dates: 7–9 August
- Teams: 4

Final positions
- Champions: Tunisia (1st title)
- Runners-up: Nigeria
- Third place: Cameroon
- Fourth place: Zambia

Tournament statistics
- Matches played: 4
- Goals scored: 13 (3.25 per match)

The 1997 LG Cup was the first edition of the international friendly football tournament, the LG Cup, which was played in Tunisia between 7 and 9 August 1997 at El Menzah Stadium, with the participation of four teams: Tunisia, Nigeria, Cameroon and Zambia. The Tunisia national team won it after defeating Nigeria in the final match.

== Participants ==
The participants were:

- Tunisia
- Nigeria
- Cameroon
- Zambia

== Venue ==
Tunis	1997 LG Cup (Tunisia) is located in Tunisia
El Menzah Stadium	1997 LG Cup (Tunisia) is located in Tunisia
Capacity: 45,000	1997 LG Cup (Tunisia) is located in Tunisia

== Results ==
Semi-finals
7 August – Radès
Nigeria	1
Cameroon	0
7 August – Radès
Tunisia	3
Zambia	1

Final
9 August – Radès
Tunisia	2
Nigeria	0
Third place
9 August – Radès
Cameroon (pen.)	3 (4)
Zambia	3 (3)

=== Semifinals ===
7 August 1997

Nigeria	1–0	Cameroon
Zeigbo	Report

El Menzah Stadium, Tunis
Attendance: 40,000

7 August 1997

Tunisia	3–1	Zambia
Ben Slimane; Souayah; Gabsi	Report	Kamwandi

El Menzah Stadium, Tunis
Attendance: 40,000

=== Third place match ===
9 August 1997

Cameroon	3–3	Zambia
Suffo 45'; Kamwanga 70' (o.g.); Etot 86'	Report	Lota 32' 79'; Kamwandi 68'
Penalties
	4–3

El Menzah Stadium, Tunis
Attendance: 40,000

=== Final ===
9 August 1997

Tunisia	2–0	Nigeria
Souayah 12' (pen.); Jelassi 90+4'	Report

El Menzah Stadium, Tunis
Attendance: 40,000
Referee: Said Belqola (Morocco)

1997 LG Cup winner

Tunisia
First title
