= Rahimpour =

The surname Rahimpour may refer to:

- Hassan Rahimpour Azghadi, an Iranian politician
- Siamak Rahimpour, an Iranian soccer player
