= Hisanori =

- Gender: Male

Origin
- Origin: Japanese
- Meaning: Different meanings depending on the kanji used

Hisanori (written: 尚成, 尚徳, 永徳, 寿典 or 久則) is a masculine Japanese given name. Notable people with the name include:

- Hisanori Fujita (藤田 尚徳) (1880–1970), Imperial Japanese Navy admiral
- Hisanori Ōiwa (大岩 永徳) (born 1978), Japanese actor
- Hisanori Shirasawa (白澤 久則) (born 1964), Japanese footballer
- Hisanori Takada (高田 寿典) (born 1981), Japanese footballer
- Hisanori Takahashi (高橋 尚成) (born 1975), Japanese baseball player
