= Bousnina =

Neffati is a Tunisian surname. Notable people with the surname include:

- Farès Bousnina (born 2006), Tunisian footballer
- Noureddine Bousnina (born 1963), Tunisian footballer
- Ouissem Bousnina (born 1976), Tunisian handball player
