= Omer Yengo =

Football referee from the Republic of the Congo

- Full name: Omer Yengo
- Born: 19 November 1954 (age 71); Republic of the Congo

Domestic
| Years | League | Role |
| ??–1998 | Congo Ligue 1 | Referee |

International
| Years | League | Role |
| 1990–1998 | FIFA-listed | Referee |

Omer Yengo (born 19 November 1954) is a former football referee from the Republic of the Congo.

== Career ==
Yengo was a FIFA referee who officiated international football matches between 1990 and 1998. He was one of the CAF representatives at the 1991 FIFA Women's World Cup in China. He refereed the group stage match between Denmark and New Zealand (3–0) and the quarter-final between the United States and Taiwan (7–0). Yengo also served as an assistant referee in another group stage match. In January 1993, he officiated the final of the inaugural CAF Super Cup between the Moroccan club Wydad AC and the Ivorian representative Africa Sports d'Abidjan. Two months later, Yengo officiated a match at the 1993 FIFA World Youth Championship between Norway and Saudi Arabia (0-0) and later, the goalless first leg of the 1994 African Cup of Champions Clubs final between Zamalek SC (Egypt) and Espérance Sportive de Tunis (Tunisia).

Yengo's career as a referee also included four appearances at the Africa Cup of Nations. After overseeing one match each in 1992 and 1994, he was selected for group stage matches in the 1996 edition, and the third-place match between Ghana and Zambia. He also officiated two more matches at the 1998 African Cup of Nations, for which he received heavy criticism over his handling of a match between Burkina Faso and Guinea.

== Selected record ==
1991 FIFA Women's World Cup – China
| Date | Match | Result | Round |
|---|---|---|---|
| 17 November 1991 | Denmark – New Zealand | 3–0 | Group stage |
| 24 November 1991 | United States – Taiwan | 7–0 | Quarter-final |
1996 African Cup of Nations – South Africa
| Date | Match | Result | Round |
| 19 January 1996 | Gabon – Zaire | 2–0 | Group stage |
| 3 February 1996 | Ghana – Zambia | 0–1 | Third-place |
1998 African Cup of Nations – Burkina Faso
| Date | Match | Result | Round |
| 12 February 1998 | Togo – Ghana | 2–1 | Group stage |
| 15 February 1998 | Burkina Faso – Guinea | 1–0 | Group stage |
