= List of international goals scored by Issam Jemâa =

Issam Jemâa is a Tunisian former professional footballer who represented the Tunisia national football team as a Forward from 2005 to 2014. Jemâa scored 36 international goals in 84 FIFA-recognised appearances, making him the country's all-time top-scorer. Jemâa emade his international debut against Botswana on 6 April 2005, in a 3–1 victory during 2006 FIFA World Cup qualification. He subsequently reached the quarter-finals of the Africa Cup of Nations in 2006 and 2008. He was also selected by Roger Lemerre for the 2006 FIFA World Cup, but was replaced by Chaouki Ben Saada due to a knee injury. Furthermore, he took part in the 2010 Africa Cup of Nations.

On 10 October 2010, he scored a goal against Togo in a 2–1 win in Lomé during the qualifiers for the 2012 Africa Cup of Nations qualification, becoming the all-time leading goalscorer for Tunisia national team with 22 goals in 50 appearances. In a match against Malawi, he scored twice, though his team ultimately had to settle for a 2–2 draw. With six goals, he finished as the top scorer in the 2012 Africa Cup of Nations qualification.

== Goals ==
Scores and results list Tunisia's goal tally first, score column indicates score after each Jemâa goal.

Table key
Indicates Tunisia won the match
Indicates the match ended in a draw
Indicates Tunisia lost the match

List of international goals scored by Issam Jemâa
No.	Date	Cap	Venue	Opponent	Score	Result	Competition	Ref.
1	3 September 2005	6	Moi International Sports Centre, Nairobi, Kenya	Kenya	2–0	2–0	2006 FIFA World Cup qualification	
2	30 May 2006	13	7 November Stadium, Tunis, Tunisia	Belarus	3–0	3–0	Friendly	
3	7 February 2007	16	Moulay Abdellah Sports Complex, Rabat, Morocco	Morocco	1–1	1–1	Friendly	
4	24 March 2007	17	Stade Linité, Victoria, Seychelles	Seychelles	1–0	3–0	2008 Africa Cup of Nations qualification	
5	24 March 2007	17	Stade Linité, Victoria, Seychelles	Seychelles	2–0	3–0	2008 Africa Cup of Nations qualification	
6	24 March 2007	17	Stade Linité, Victoria, Seychelles	Seychelles	3–0	3–0	2008 Africa Cup of Nations qualification	
7	2 June 2007	18	7 November Stadium, Tunis, Tunisia	Seychelles	1–0	4–0	2008 Africa Cup of Nations qualification	
8	16 June 2007	19	7 November Stadium, Tunis, Tunisia	Mauritius	1–0	2–0	2008 Africa Cup of Nations qualification	
9	17 November 2007	22	7 November Stadium, Tunis, Tunisia	Namibia	2–0	2–0	Friendly	
10	23 January 2008	25	Tamale Stadium, Tamale, Ghana	Senegal	1–0	2–2	2008 Africa Cup of Nations	
11	7 June 2008	31	Stade Linité, Victoria, Seychelles	Seychelles	1–0	2–0	2010 FIFA World Cup qualification	
12	21 June 2008	33	7 November Stadium, Tunis, Tunisia	Burundi	2–0	2–1	2010 FIFA World Cup qualification	
13	14 October 2008	35	Stade de France, Saint-Denis, France	France	1–0	1–3	Friendly	
14	28 March 2009	38	Nyayo National Stadium, Nairobi, Kenya	Kenya	2–1	2–1	2010 FIFA World Cup qualification	
15	11 October 2009	41	7 November Stadium, Tunis, Tunisia	Kenya	1–0	1–0	2010 FIFA World Cup qualification	
16	30 May 2010	48	7 November Stadium, Tunis, Tunisia	France	1–0	1–1	Friendly	
17	20 June 2010	49	Khartoum Stadium, Khartoum, Sudan	Sudan	4–0	6–2	Friendly	
18	20 June 2010	49	Khartoum Stadium, Khartoum, Sudan	Sudan	5–0	6–2	Friendly	
19	11 August 2010	51	Stade National, N'Djamena, Chad	Chad	2–0	3–1	2012 Africa Cup of Nations qualification	
20	4 September 2010	52	7 November Stadium, Tunis, Tunisia	Malawi	1–0	2–2	2012 Africa Cup of Nations qualification	
21	4 September 2010	52	7 November Stadium, Tunis, Tunisia	Malawi	2–0	2–2	2012 Africa Cup of Nations qualification	
22	10 October 2010	53	Kégué Stadium, Lomé, Togo	Togo	1–0	2–1	2012 Africa Cup of Nations qualification	
23	5 June 2011	55	Sousse Olympic Stadium, Sousse, Tunisia	Chad	1–0	5–0	2012 Africa Cup of Nations qualification	
24	5 June 2011	55	Sousse Olympic Stadium, Sousse, Tunisia	Chad	3–0	5–0	2012 Africa Cup of Nations qualification	
25	5 June 2011	55	Sousse Olympic Stadium, Sousse, Tunisia	Chad	5–0	5–0	2012 Africa Cup of Nations qualification	
26	10 August 2011	56	Mustapha Ben Jannet Stadium, Monastir, Tunisia	Mali	4–1	4–2	Friendly	
27	27 January 2012	60	Stade d'Angondjé, Libreville, Gabon	Niger	2–1	2–1	2012 Africa Cup of Nations	
28	27 May 2012	64	Mustapha Ben Jannet Stadium, Monastir, Tunisia	Rwanda	4–1	5–1	Friendly	
29	2 June 2012	65	Mustapha Ben Jannet Stadium, Monastir, Tunisia	Equatorial Guinea	1–1	3–1	2014 FIFA World Cup qualification	
30	9 June 2012	66	Estádio da Várzea, Praia, Cape Verde	Cape Verde	2–1	2–1	2014 FIFA World Cup qualification	
31	15 August 2012	67	Széktói Stadion, Kecskemét, Hungary	Iran	2–2	2–2	Friendly	
32	30 December 2012	71	Al-Shaab Stadium, Baghdad, Iraq	Iraq	1–0	2–1	Friendly	
33	13 January 2013	74	Baba Yara Stadium, Kumasi, Ghana	Ghana	1–0	2–4	Friendly	
34	13 January 2013	74	Baba Yara Stadium, Kumasi, Ghana	Ghana	2–0	2–4	Friendly	
35	14 August 2013	78	Radès Olympic Stadium, Tunis, Tunisia	Congo	2–0	3–0	Friendly	
36	14 August 2013	78	Radès Olympic Stadium, Tunis, Tunisia	Congo	3–0	3–0	Friendly	

== Hat-tricks ==
List of international hat-tricks scored by Issam Jemâa
No.	Date	Venue	Opponent	Goals	Result	Competition
1	24 March 2007	Stade Linité, Victoria, Seychelles	Seychelles	3 (16', 76', 80')	3–0	2008 Africa Cup of Nations qualification
2	5 June 2011	Sousse Olympic Stadium, Sousse, Tunisia	Chad	3 (22', 44', 53')	5–0	2012 Africa Cup of Nations qualification

== Statistics ==
Appearances and goals by year
Year	Competitive		Friendly		Total	
Year	Apps	Goals	Apps	Goals	Apps	Goals
2005	5	0	3	1	8	1
2006	3	0	4	1	7	1
2007	1	0	7	7	8	7
2008	9	3	4	1	13	4
2009	3	1	4	0	7	2
2010	7	4	3	3	10	7
2011	3	3	3	1	6	4
2012	7	3	5	3	12	6
2013	4	0	5	4	9	4
2014	1	0	3	0	4	0
Total	43	14	41	22	84	36

Appearances and goals by competition
Competition	Apps	Goals
Africa Cup of Nations qualification	10	12
FIFA World Cup qualification	19	7
Friendlies	41	15
Africa Cup of Nations	13	2
FIFA Confederations Cup	1	0
Total	84	36

Goals by Opponent
Opponent	Goals
Seychelles	5
Chad	4
Kenya	3
Congo	2
France	2
Ghana	2
Malawi	2
Sudan	2
Belarus	1
Burundi	1
Cape Verde	1
Equatorial Guinea	1
Iran	1
Iraq	1
Mali	1
Mauritius	1
Morocco	1
Namibia	1
Niger	1
Rwanda	1
Senegal	1
Togo	1
Total	36

== See also ==
- List of top international association football goal scorers by country
- List of Tunisia national football team hat-tricks
