= List of Tunisia international footballers born outside Tunisia =

The Tunisia national football team has used footballers born outside Tunisia throughout its history with varying success.

== List of players ==
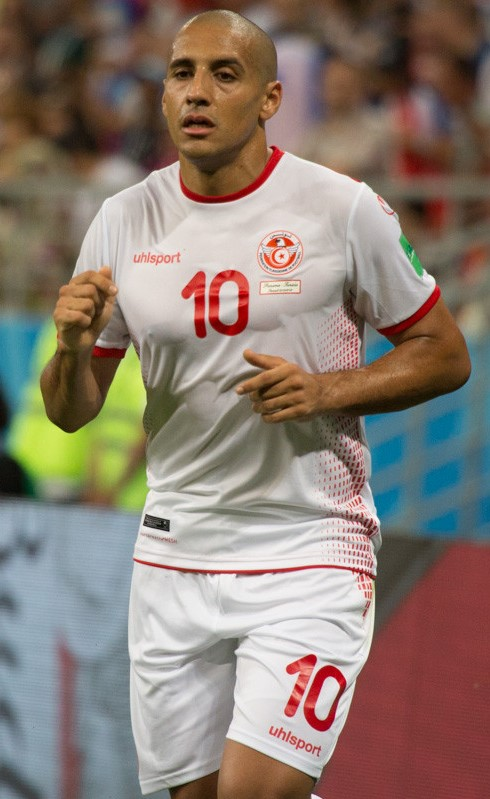
Wahbi Khazri is considered one of the most important dual citizenship players to have represented the Tunisian national team. He is the Tunisian player with the most goals scored in the FIFA World Cup, with three goals, and is the second-highest scorer in the team's history.

This is a list of football players who represented the Tunisia national football team in international football and were born outside Tunisia.

The following players:

1. have played at least one game for the full (senior male) Tunisia national team; and
2. were born outside Tunisia.

This list includes players who have dual citizenship with Tunisia and/or have become naturalised Tunisian citizens. The players are ordered per modern–day country of birth; if the country at the time of birth differs from the current, this is indicated with a footnote.

As of 17 November 2026

Country of birth	Player	Caps	Goals	Period	Refs.
Brazil	José Clayton	39	4	1998–2006	
Brazil	Adailton Pereira	2	0	2001–2002	
Brazil	Francileudo Santos	41	22	2004–2008	
Canada	Rayan Elloumi	6	0	2026–present	
Denmark	Anis Ben Slimane	46	4	2020–present	
Italy	Karim Laribi	2	0	2017	
Germany	Sami Allagui	26	5	2008–2014	
Germany	Sofian Chahed	4	0	2009–2013	
Germany	Änis Ben-Hatira	12	1	2012–2016	
Germany	Mohamed Dräger	40	3	2018–present	
Germany	Marc Lamti	3	0	2019	
Germany	Elias Saad	19	4	2024–present	
Germany	Rani Khedira	6	0	2026	
Germany	Louey Ben Farhat	2	0	2026	
France	Adel Chedli	57	4	1996–2012	
France	Mehdi Nafti	46	1	2002–2010	
France	Selim Benachour	44	2	2002–2010	
France	Alaeddine Yahia	25	1	2002–2014	
France	Hamed Namouchi	21	1	2005–2008	
France	Chaouki Ben Saada	40	5	2005–2010	
France	David Jemmali	10	0	2006–2007	
France	Hocine Ragued	54	0	2006–2015	
France	Tijani Belaïd	20	3	2007–2015	
France	Jamel Saihi	20	2	2008–2016	
France	Fahid Ben Khalfallah	17	2	2008–2011	
France	Aïmen Demai	2	0	2009	
France	Nabil Taïder	4	1	2009–2010	
France	Fabien Camus	3	1	2009–2015	
France	Yohan Benalouane	5	0	2010–2018	
France	Syam Ben Youssef	48	2	2010–2019	
France	Aymen Belaïd	3	0	2012	
France	Abdelkader Oueslati	8	0	2012–2016	
France	Wahbi Khazri	74	25	2013–2022	
France	Stéphane Nater	12	0	2014–2015	
France	Selim Ben Djemia	5	0	2014–2015	
France	Bilel Mohsni	9	0	2014–2018	
France	Mohamed Gouaida	3	0	2015	
France	Yoann Touzghar	6	1	2015–2022	
France	Larry Azouni	10	0	2016–2019	
France	Anice Badri	27	8	2016–2019	
France	Naïm Sliti	85	16	2016–2026	
France	Dylan Bronn	53	2	2017–present	
France	Mouez Hassen	21	0	2018–2023	
France	Ellyes Skhiri	86	4	2018–2026	
France	Saîf-Eddine Khaoui	28	4	2018–present	
France	Nader Ghandri	20	0	2019–2026	
France	Idris El Mizouni	2	0	2019–2024	
France	Wajdi Kechrida	39	0	2019–present	
France	Nabil Makni	3	0	2020–2024	
France	Hamza Rafia	37	4	2020–present	
France	Aïssa Laïdouni	62	2	2021–present	
France	Hannibal Mejbri	48	1	2021–present	
France	Montassar Talbi	71	4	2021–present	
France	Chaïm El Djebali	1	0	2022	
France	Elias Achouri	35	4	2022–present	
France	Yan Valery	26	0	2022–present	
France	Ismaël Gharbi	23	2	2025–present	
France	Samy Chouchane	1	0	2026–present	
Netherlands	Omar Rekik	9	1	2021–present	
Norway	Sebastian Tounekti	17	1	2021–present	
Saudi Arabia	Adem Arous	4	1	2025–present	
Sweden	Amor Layouni	16	2	2019–present	
Sweden	Ali Youssef	5	0	2021–present	
Sweden	Adam Ben Lamin	1	0	2022	
Sweden	Rami Kaib	2	0	2022–present	
Sweden	Moutaz Neffati	5	0	2025–present	
Switzerland	Yassin Mikari	32	1	2007–2015	
Switzerland	Salim Khelifi	2	0	2019	
Switzerland	Sayfallah Ltaief	26	1	2022–present	

== See also ==
- List of Tunisia international footballers
