= 1994 African Cup of Champions Clubs =

Tournament details
- Dates: 1994
- Teams: 38 (from 38 associations)

Final positions
- Champions: (Tunisia) Espérance de Tunis (1st title)
- Runners-up: (Egypt) Zamalek

Tournament statistics
- Matches played: 64
- Goals scored: 167 (2.61 per match)

The 1994 African Cup of Champions Clubs was the 30th edition of the annual international club football competition held in the CAF region (Africa), the African Cup of Champions Clubs. It determined the African club champion of association football in Africa for that year.

Espérance from Tunisia won that final, and became for the first time CAF club champion.

== Preliminary round ==
Team 1	Agg.	Team 2	1st leg	2nd leg
Mebrat Hail (Ethiopia)	5–4	(Rwanda) SC Kiyovu Sport	3–2	2–2
Lobatse CS Gunners (Botswana)	5–3	(Namibia) Chief Santos	2–0	3–3
Mighty Barolle (Liberia)	w/o	(Togo) Semassi	—	—
Postel 2000 FC (Chad)	0–3	(Central African Republic) AS Tempête Mocaf	0–1	0–2
JS Saint-Pierroise (Réunion)	6–2	(Eswatini) Mbabane Swallows	4–0	2–2
ACS Sonader Ksar (Mauritania)	2–0	(Cape Verde) Académica do Sal	2–0	0–0

== First round ==
Team 1	Agg.	Team 2	1st leg	2nd leg
Kaloum Star (Guinea)	1–3	(Central African Republic) AS Tempête Mocaf	1–0	0–3
Al-Merrikh (Sudan)	0–2	(Tanzania) Simba SC	0–1	0–1
Arsenal FC (Lesotho)	1–5	(South Africa) Mamelodi Sundowns	0–1	1–4
Costa do Sol (Mozambique)	4–3	(Réunion) JS Saint-Pierroise	2–0	2–3
East End Lions (Sierra Leone)	2–2 (2–3 p)	(Mali) Stade Malien	2–0	0–2
Espérance de Tunis (Tunisia)	8–2	(Burkina Faso) EF Ouagadougou	5–0	3–2
Fire Brigade SC (Mauritius)	2–3	(Madagascar) BTM Antananarivo	1–1	1–2
Gor Mahia (Kenya)	3–3 (a)	(Ethiopia) Mebrat Hail	2–0	1–3
Iwuanyanwu Nationale (Nigeria)	6–1	(Niger) Zumunta AC	3–0	3–1
MC Oran (Algeria)	4–2	(Mauritania) ACS Sonader Ksar	4–0 (Note: MC Oran received all it matches in Akid Lotfi Stadium, Tlemcen. The Ahmed Zabana Stadium and Habib Bouakeul Stadium in Oran were suspended because of incident of fans of MC Oran in match of the 1993 African Cup of Champions Clubs against Zamalek SC.)	0–2
Nkana Red Devils (Zambia)	dq	(Zimbabwe) Highlanders FC	—	—
Petro Atlético (Angola)	1–2	(Gabon) AS Sogara	0–0	1–2
RC Bafoussam (Cameroon)	dq	(Benin) Dragons de l'Ouémé	—	—
AS Vita Club (Zaire)	6–1	(Botswana) Lobatse CS Gunners	5–0	1–1
Wydad AC (Morocco)	6–3	(Togo) Semassi	6–1	0–2
Zamalek (Egypt)	dq	(Uganda) Express FC	—	—

== Second round ==
Team 1	Agg.	Team 2	1st leg	2nd leg
Costa do Sol (Mozambique)	1–2	(Zambia) Nkana Red Devils	1–0	0–2
Gor Mahia (Kenya)	2–3	(Egypt) Zamalek	1–1	1–2
Iwuanyanwu Nationale (Nigeria)	4–4 (a)	(Cameroon) RC Bafoussam	1–2	3–2
MC Oran (Algeria)	10–4	(Central African Republic) AS Tempête Mocaf	7–4	3–0
Simba SC (Tanzania)	1–0	(Madagascar) BTM Antananarivo	1–0	0–0
Stade Malien (Mali)	0–4	(Tunisia) Espérance de Tunis	0–1	0–3
AS Vita Club (Zaire)	4–4 (a)	(South Africa) Mamelodi Sundowns	2–1	2–3
Wydad AC (Morocco)	0–3	(Gabon) AS Sogara	0–1	0–2

== Quarter-finals ==
Team 1	Agg.	Team 2	1st leg	2nd leg
Zamalek (Egypt)	3–2	(Gabon) AS Sogara	1–0	2–2
AS Vita Club (Zaire)	w/o	(Algeria) MC Oran	—	—
Nkana Red Devils (Zambia)	4–3	(Tanzania) Simba SC	4–1	0–2
Espérance de Tunis (Tunisia)	4–1	(Nigeria) Iwuanyanwu Nationale	3–0	1–1

== Semi-finals ==
Team 1	Agg.	Team 2	1st leg	2nd leg
Espérance de Tunis (Tunisia)	5–3	(Algeria) MC Oran	3–1	2–2
Zamalek (Egypt)	2–1	(Zambia) Nkana Red Devils	2–0	0–1

== Final ==
4 December 1994
--:-- UTC+2

Zamalek (Egypt)	0–0	(Tunisia) Espérance de Tunis

Cairo International Stadium, Cairo
Attendance: 90,000
Referee: Omer Yengo (Congo)
17 December 1994
--:-- UTC+1

Espérance de Tunis (Tunisia)	3–1	(Egypt) Zamalek
Berkhissa 16', 62'; Ben Neji 50' (pen.)		Nssar 87'

Stade El Menzah, Tunis
Attendance: 50,000
Referee: Lim Kee Chong (Mauritius)

== Champion ==
1994 African Cup of Champions Clubs Winners
(Tunisia)
Espérance
First title

== Top scorers ==
The top scorers from the 1994 African Cup of Champions Clubs are as follows:

Rank	Name	Team	Goals
1	(Nigeria) Anthony Nwaigwe	(Nigeria) Iwuanyanwu Nationale	7
2	(Ethiopia) Elias Juhar	(Ethiopia) Mebrat Hail	6
3	(Tunisia) Ayadi Hamrouni	(Tunisia) Espérance de Tunis	5
4	(Tunisia) Ali Ben Neji	(Tunisia) Espérance de Tunis	4
4	(Zambia) Kenneth Malitoli	(Tunisia) Espérance de Tunis	4
6	(Algeria) Abdelhafid Tasfaout	(Algeria) MC Oran	3
6	(Tunisia) Hassen Gabsi	(Tunisia) Espérance de Tunis	3
8	(Egypt) Khaled El Ghandour	(Egypt) Zamalek	2
8	(Egypt) Ahmed Ramzy	(Egypt) Zamalek	2
8	(Ghana) Abdel Rahman Oscar	(Egypt) Zamalek	2
8	(Tunisia) Hédi Berkhissa	(Tunisia) Espérance de Tunis	2

== Notes & references ==
=== References ===
- 1994 African Cup of Champions Clubs - rsssf.com
