= Adnan Sabouni =

Syrian footballer (1971–2015)

Personal information
- Date of birth: 13 November 1971
- Place of birth: Syria
- Date of death: 27 February 2015 (aged 43)
- Place of death: Syria
- Position: Defender

International career
Years	Team	Apps	(Gls)
1988	Syria	3	(0)
1989	Syria Under 20	2	(0)

Adnan Sabouni is a Syrian football defender who played for Syria in the 1988 Asian Cup.

He died on 27 February 2015.

== International Record ==
Year	Competition	Apps	Goal
1988	Asian Cup	3	0
1989	FIFA Under 20 World Cup	2	0
Total		5	0
