= Hédi Berkhissa =

Tunisian footballer

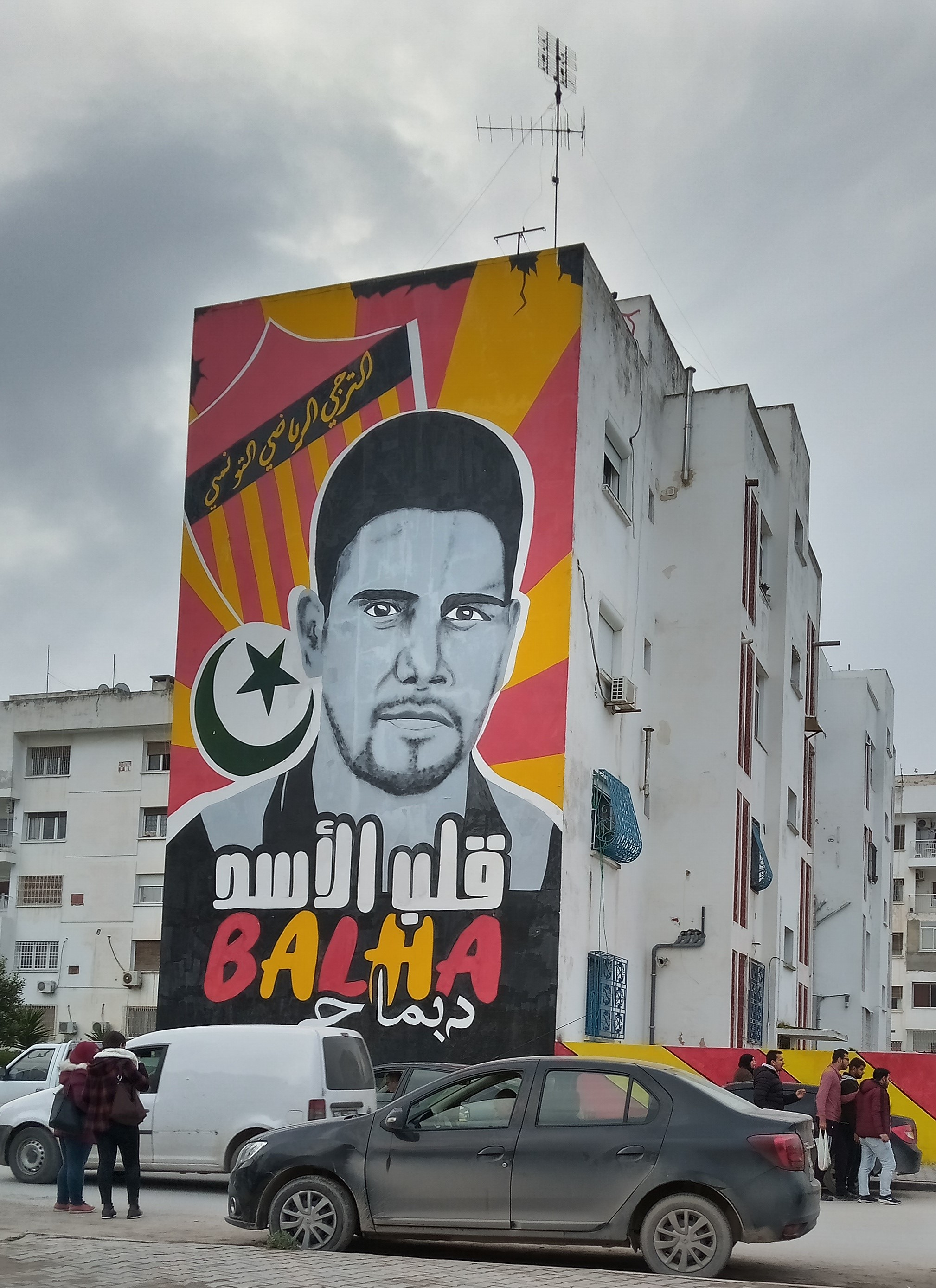
- Mural painting of Berrekhissa in December 2020.

Personal information
- Full name: Hédi Berkhissa
- Date of birth: 28 June 1972
- Place of birth: Remla, Tunisia
- Date of death: 4 January 1997 (aged 24)
- Place of death: Tunis, Tunisia
- Height: 2.00 m (6 ft 7 in)
- Position: Left back

Senior career*
Years	Team	Apps	(Gls)
1991–1997	Espérance	98	(9)

International career^{‡}
1994–1997	Tunisia	26	(6)
- * Club domestic league appearances and goals as of 31 August 2007 ‡ National team caps and goals as of 23 June 2006

Hédi «Balha» Berkhissa (28 June 1972 – 4 January 1997) was a Tunisian footballer who played for Espérance and the Tunisian National Team as a defender.

== Early life ==
Born on the island of Kerkennah off the coast of Tunisia on June 28, 1972, to a Tunisian father and Algerian mother, Berkhissa left with his family to settle in France; however, he returned six years later to learn Arabic. Inability to settle there made him decided to move back to France in 1981. He returned permanently to Tunisia with his family when he was 16. Having played football while living in France he joined his local team in the capital, Espérance.

== Career ==
Berkhissa made his first appearance for Espérance when he was 18 years old. It was a dream debut on 31 January 1991 in the Tunis derby against local rivals Club Africain, with the game ending in a draw. He scored his first league goal for Espérance in the Tunis derby against Club Africain a game which ended in a 2–0 victory for Espérance. In total, Berkhissa made 98 league appearances for the club, scoring 9 goals. He also made 13 appearances in the Tunisian President Cup and made 24 appearances in African club competitions scoring 2 memorable goals in one game against Egyptian giants Al Zamalek.

== Death ==
On 4 January 1997, in a friendly match between Espérance and French side Lyon at Stade Chedli Zouiten, Berkhissa had a heart attack on the field in the last minutes of the game and died.

== Honours ==
- Chosen as the Tunisian Player Of the Year in 1995
- Chosen as the Arab Player Of the Year in 1995
- Won the Tunisian League three times with Espérance in 1991, 1993 and 1994
- Won the Tunisian President Cup once with Espérance in 1991
- Won the African Champions League once with Espérance in 1994
- Won the CAF Super Cup once with Espérance in 1995
- Won the Arab Club Champions Cup with Espérance in 1993
- Won the Afro-Asian Club Championship with Espérance in 1995
- Won the Arab Super Cup with Espérance in 1996
- Finalist of the African Cup of Nations once with Tunisia in 1996
