= Noureddine Bounâas =

Algerian footballer (born 1965)

Personal information
- Date of birth: 18 October 1965 (age 61)
- Place of birth: Constantine, Algeria
- Position: Defender

International career
Years	Team	Apps	(Gls)
1989–1990	Algeria	2	(0)

Noureddine Bounâas (born 18 October 1965) is an Algerian footballer who played as a defender. He played two games for the Algeria national football team in 1989 and 1990. He was also named in Algeria's squad for the 1990 African Cup of Nations.
