= Mohamed Manaâ =

Algerian footballer (born 1964)

Personal information
- Date of birth: 21 November 1964 (age 61)

International career
Years	Team	Apps	(Gls)
1989	Algeria	1	(0)

Mohamed Manaâ (born 21 November 1964) is an Algerian former footballer. He played in one match for the Algeria national football team in 1989. He was also named in Algeria's squad for the 1990 African Cup of Nations tournament.
