= Marouene Guezmir =

Tunisian footballer (born 1974)

Personal information
- Date of birth: 6 March 1974 (age 52)
- Place of birth: Tunisia
- Height: 1.76 m (5 ft 9 in)
- Position: Midfielder

Senior career*
Years	Team	Apps	(Gls)
1993–1996	EST		
1996–1999	SC Freiburg	22	(0)
1999–2001	CA Bizertin		
- * Club domestic league appearances and goals

Marouene Guezmir (born 6 March 1974) is a Tunisian former professional footballer who played as a midfielder.

== Career ==
In 1996, Guezmir signed for Bundesliga side SC Freiburg, where he made 22 league appearances and scored one goal and suffered injuries and relegation to the 2. Bundesliga. On 17 August 1996, he debuted for SC Freiburg during a 1–1 draw with Werder Bremen. On 3 May 1997, Guezmir scored his first goal for SC Freiburg during a 2–0 win over MSV Duisburg.
