= Juma Hilal Faraj =

Bahraini footballer

Juma Hilal
Personal information
- Full name: Juma Hilal Faraj
- Place of birth: Bahrain
- Position: Defender

International career
Years	Team	Apps	(Gls)
1987–1988	Bahrain	1	(0)

Juma Hilal Faraj is a Bahraini footballer who played for Bahrain in the 1988 Asian Cup.
