= Mansour Mohamed =

Kuwaiti footballer

Mansour Basha
Personal information
- Full name: Mansour Mohamed Basha
- Date of birth: 3 September 1970 (age 56)
- Position: Midfielder

Senior career*
Years	Team	Apps	(Gls)
????—2003	Al-Arabi		

International career
- Kuwait
- * Club domestic league appearances and goals

Mansour Mohamed Basha (born 3 September 1970) is a Kuwaiti footballer. He competed in the men's tournament at the 1992 Summer Olympics.
