= Frazier Kamwandi =

Zambian footballer (born 1972)

Personal information
- Date of birth: 10 March 1972 (age 54)

International career
Years	Team	Apps	(Gls)
1997–1999	Zambia	8	(0)

Frazier Kamwandi (born 10 March 1972) is a Zambian footballer. He played in eight matches for the Zambia national football team from 1997 to 1999. He was also named in Zambia's squad for the 1998 African Cup of Nations tournament.
