= Fahad Marzouq =

Kuwaiti footballer (born 1971)

Fahad Kameel
Personal information
- Full name: Fahad Kameel Matar Marzouq
- Date of birth: 2 January 1971 (age 55)
- Place of birth: kuwait city
- Height: 1.80 m (5 ft 11 in)
- Position: Forward

Senior career*
Years	Team	Apps	(Gls)
1980–2000	Al Tadhamon		

International career
1987–1994	Kuwait		
- * Club domestic league appearances and goals

Fahad Kameel Marzouq (born 2 January 1971) is a Kuwaiti former footballer. He competed in the men's tournament at the 1992 Summer Olympics.
