= Constantin Etot =

Cameroonian footballer

Personal information
- Full name: Constantin Etot
- Date of birth: 9 June 1966 (age 60)
- Place of birth: Eséka, Cameroon
- Position: Midfielder

Senior career*
Years	Team	Apps	(Gls)
?–1989	Istres FC	46	(8)
1992-1994	Angoulême Charente FC	59	(7)
1994-1994	Aubervilliers	32	(6)
1996-1997	Besançon RC	22	(4)
1998	Burgos CF	12	(2)

International career
1997	Cameroon	2	(0)
- * Club domestic league appearances and goals

Constantin Etot (born 9 June 1966) is a Cameroonian former professional footballer who played as a Midfielder.

== Club career ==
Etot started his career with French side Istres FC, leaving the club in 1989.

He went on to play for several other French sides between 1992 and 1997.

The midfielder had trials with several Scottish sides in the summer of 1997, including Livingston, Dunfermline and Hearts. He played as a trialist for Livi against Stranraer on 16 August 1997. However, Etot was not offered a permanent deal by any club.

He was given a one week trial with Fulham by then manager Ray Wilkins in October 1997. Etot played two reserve games, scoring one goal, but was not offered a permanent deal by the London club.

== International career ==
He made his international debut for Cameroon on 9 March 1997, starting in a 5-0 defeat to Costa Rica. Etot went on to make one further appearance for his country.

== Post-playing career ==
Since retiring from playing, Etot has been involved in JAN-NPS-FC, which is an enterprise aimed at education and cultural integration for young people. As of 2023, he was also the Technical Director and Coach of CFCP-IDF Women's team.
