= Wasfi Jabbar =

Iraqi association football player

Personal information
- Full name: Wasfi Jabbar Jaber
- Date of birth: 1 July 1964 (age 62)
- Place of birth: Iraq
- Position: Goalkeeper

International career
Years	Team	Apps	(Gls)
1983–1988	Iraq		

Wasfi Jabbar Jaber (Arabic: وَصْفِيّ جَبَّار جَابِر; born 1 July 1964) is a former Iraqi football goalkeeper who played for Iraq at the 1988 Arab Nations Cup.

Jabbar played for Iraq between 1983 and 1988.
