= Oscar Laud =

Ghanaian footballer

Personal information
- Date of birth: 1 May 1976 (age 50)
- Position: Forward

Senior career*
Years	Team	Apps	(Gls)
1993–1994	Dawu Youngstars		
1994–1995	Zamalek		(3)
1995–1998	Dawu Youngstars		
1998–2001	Kickers Emden	17	(0)
2002–2004	SV 19 Straelen		
2006–2008	Eintracht Emmerich		
2008	SV Vrasselt		
2009–2010	DJK Hüthum-Borghees		
2010–2013	Germania Wemb		
2013–2014	SV Schottheide-Frasselt		

International career
1994–1995	Ghana	4	(1)
- * Club domestic league appearances and goals

Oscar Laud (born 1 May 1976) is a Ghanaian former professional footballer who played as a forward. He played in four matches for the Ghana national team in 1994 and 1995, scoring one goal. He was also named in Ghana's squad for the 1994 African Cup of Nations tournament, without playing.

After a short spell in Egypt, Laud moved to Germany in 1998. He got one season in the Regionalliga, but later played on lower tiers from the fourth to the eleventh.
