= Ammar Habib =

Syrian footballer (born 1967)

Personal information
- Date of birth: October 25, 1967 (age 59)
- Place of birth: Syria
- Position: Defender

Senior career*
Years	Team	Apps	(Gls)
- Tishreen
- Jableh

International career
- Syria U20
- Syria
- * Club domestic league appearances and goals

Ammar Habib (Arabic: عمار حبيب) is a Syrian retired professional football defender who played for the Syria national football team during the 1980s.

== Career ==
Habib won the Syrian Premier League with Tishreen in 1997. He also won the 1987 Mediterranean Games with the national team.
