= Ayadi Hamrouni =

Tunisian footballer

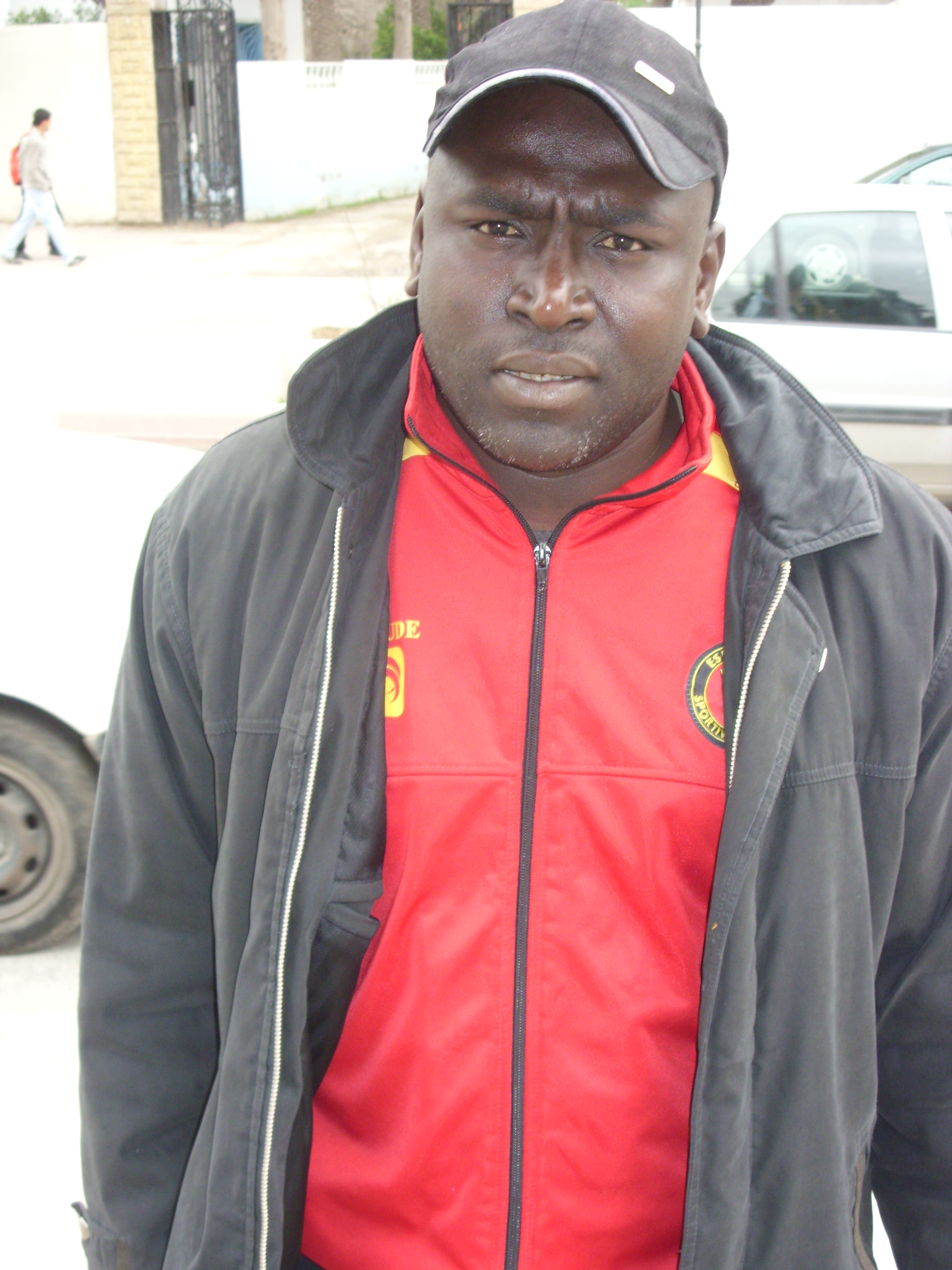
- Hamrouni in 2009

Personal information
- Date of birth: 24 December 1971 (age 54)
- Place of birth: Oudhref, Tunisia

International career
Years	Team	Apps	(Gls)
1992–1999	Tunisia	33	(9)

Ayadi Hamrouni (born 24 December 1971) is a Tunisian footballer who played as a forward. He played in 33 matches for the Tunisia national football team from 1992 to 1999. He was also named in Tunisia's squad for the 1994 African Cup of Nations tournament.

His daughter Amal Hamrouni is a professional handball player.
