= Radwan Ajam =

Syrian footballer (born 1971)

Personal information
- Full name: Radwan Ajam
- Date of birth: 20 November 1971 (age 54)
- Place of birth: Syria
- Position: Midfielder

International career
Years	Team	Apps	(Gls)
1988–1992	Syria	7	(0)

Radwan Ajam (born 20 November 1971) is a Syrian football midfielder who played for Syria in the 1988 Asian Cup.

== International Record ==
Year	Competition	Apps	Goal
1988	Asian Cup	1	0
Total		1	0
