= Abdullah Saddikah =

Syrian footballer (born 1971)

Personal information
- Date of birth: 18 November 1971 (age 54)
- Place of birth: Syria
- Position: Defender

International career
Years	Team	Apps	(Gls)
1988	Syria	2	(0)
1989	Syria Under 20	1	(0)

Abdullah Saddikah is a Syrian football defender who played for Syria in the 1988 Asian Cup.

== International Record ==
Year	Competition	Apps	Goal
1988	Asian Cup	2	0
1989	FIFA Under 20 World Cup	1	0
Total		3	0
