= Siamak Rahimpour =

Iranian footballer

Siamak Reihanipour
Personal information
- Date of birth: 1963 (age 62–63)
- Place of birth: Iran
- Position: Defender

Senior career*
Years	Team	Apps	(Gls)
1981–1992	Shahin		
1992–1996	Pas		
1996–1997	Esteghlal		

International career
1986–1989	Iran	10	(0)

Managerial career
- 2009–2010: Esteghlal (Assistant)
- * Club domestic league appearances and goals

Siamak Reihanipour is an Iranian football defender who played for Iran in the 1988 Asian Cup.

== Honours ==
- AFC Asian Cup (third place): 1988
