= Hisanori Shirasawa =

Japanese footballer

Hisanori Shirasawa 白澤 久則
Personal information
- Full name: Hisanori Shirasawa
- Date of birth: December 13, 1964 (age 61)
- Place of birth: Kobe, Hyogo, Japan
- Height: 1.79 m (5 ft 10 1/2 in)
- Position: Midfielder

Senior career*
Years	Team	Apps	(Gls)
1983–1992	Yanmar Diesel	93	(1)
1993	Kyoto Purple Sanga		
Total		93+	(1+)
Medal record
Yanmar Diesel
Winner	JSL Cup	1983
Winner	JSL Cup	1984
Runner-up	Emperor's Cup	1983
- * Club domestic league appearances and goals

Hisanori Shirasawa (白澤 久則, Shirasawa Hisanori; born December 13, 1964) is a former Japanese football player.

== Club career ==
Shirasawa was born in Kobe on December 13, 1964. After graduating from high school, he joined Yanmar Diesel in 1983. He played 93 games until 1992. In 1993, he moved to Kyoto Purple Sanga and retired end of the season.

== National team career ==
In 1988, Shirasawa was selected Japan national "B team" for 1988 Asian Cup. At this competition, he played 3 games. However, Japan Football Association don't count as Japan national team match because this Japan team was "B team" not "top team"
