= Jamel Zabi =

Tunisian footballer

Personal information
- Date of birth: 19 June 1975 (age 51)
- Position: Forward

International career
Years	Team	Apps	(Gls)
2001–2002	Tunisia	5	(3)

Jamel Zabi (born 19 June 1975) is a Tunisian former professional footballer who played as a forward. He played in five matches for the Tunisia national team in 2001 and 2002. He was also named in Tunisia's squad for the 2002 African Cup of Nations tournament.
