= Noureddine Bousnina =

Tunisian footballer

Personal information
- Date of birth: 17 January 1963 (age 63)
- Position: Midfielder

Senior career*
Years	Team	Apps	(Gls)
- CS Hammam-Lif

International career
1987–1989	Tunisia	16	(1)
1988	Tunisia Olympic		

Managerial career
- 2013: CS Hammam-Lif
- 2014–2015: Al Tahaddy
- 2015–2016: AS Soliman
- 2016–2017: Al Tahaddy
- * Club domestic league appearances and goals

Noureddine Bousnina (born 17 January 1963) is a Tunisian footballer who played as a midfielder for the Tunisia national team. He competed also in the men's tournament at the 1988 Summer Olympics. He later became a manager.
