= Faouzi Rouissi =

Tunisian former professional footballer (born 1971)

Personal information
- Full name: Faouzi Rouissi
- Date of birth: 20 March 1971 (age 55)
- Place of birth: Tunis, Tunisia
- Height: 1.76 m (5 ft 9 in)
- Position: Striker

Youth career
- 1981–1988: Club Africain

Senior career*
Years	Team	Apps	(Gls)
1988–1992	Club Africain	88	(29)
1992–1994	Caen	57	(6)
1994–1995	Al-Hilal	19	(7)
1997–2000	Club Africain	81	(47)
1999–2001	Greuther Fürth	40	(17)
2001–2002	Al-Wahda	12	(2)
2002–2003	Club Africain	9	(2)
Total		306	(110)

International career
1989–2001	Tunisia	54	(18)
- * Club domestic league appearances and goals

Faouzi Rouissi (born 20 March 1971 in Tunis) is a Tunisian former professional footballer who played as a striker during his club career and for the Tunisia national team.

Rouissi's career started at the age of 10, when he joined local club Club Africain. He spent seven successful years in their youth academy before debuting as a senior in the 1988–89 season. During that season, he established himself as a regular and over the next four seasons that he played there he picked up two league titles, an African cup and an afro-Asian cup before leaving for French Ligue 2 side Stade Malherbe Caen.

Rouissi also had a spell with SpVgg Greuther Fürth in the 2. Bundesliga. He played in seven FIFA World Cup qualifying matches.

== Career statistics ==
=== International ===
Appearances and goals by national team and year
National team	Year	Apps	Goals
Tunisia	1989	6	0
Tunisia	1990	4	2
Tunisia	1991	5	0
Tunisia	1992	6	2
Tunisia	1993	5	7
Tunisia	1994	4	3
Tunisia	1995	2	0
Tunisia	1996	2	0
Tunisia	1997	1	0
Tunisia	1998	7	1
Tunisia	1999	7	3
Tunisia	2000	2	0
Tunisia	2001	3	0
Total		54	18

Scores and results list Tunisia's goal tally first, score column indicates score after each Rouissi goal.

List of international goals scored by Faouzi Rouissi
No.	Date	Venue	Opponent	Score	Result	Competition	Ref.
1	19 August 1990	El Menzah Stadium, Tunis, Tunisia	Chad	2-1	2-1	1992 African Cup of Nations qualification	
2	18 November 1990	Addis Ababa Stadium, Addis Ababa, Ethiopia	Ethiopia	2-0	2-0	1992 African Cup of Nations qualification	
3	11 October 1992	El Menzah Stadium, Tunis, Tunisia	Benin	1-0	5-1	1994 FIFA World Cup qualification	
4	20 December 1992	El Menzah Stadium, Tunis, Tunisia	Morocco	1-0	1-1	1994 FIFA World Cup qualification	
5	10 January 1993	Boujemaa Kmiti Stadium, Béja, Tunisia	Bulgaria	1-0	3-0	Friendly	
6	17 January 1993	Stade de l'Amitié, Cotonou, Benin	Benin	2-0	5-0	1994 FIFA World Cup qualification	
7	17 January 1993	Stade de l'Amitié, Cotonou, Benin	Benin	3-0	5-0	1994 FIFA World Cup qualification	
8	17 January 1993	Stade de l'Amitié, Cotonou, Benin	Benin	5-0	5-0	1994 FIFA World Cup qualification	
9	22 September 1993	El Menzah Stadium, Tunis, Tunisia	Germany	1-1	1-1	Friendly	
10	7 November 1993	El Menzah Stadium, Tunis, Tunisia	Egypt	1-0	2-0	Friendly	
11	7 November 1993	El Menzah Stadium, Tunis, Tunisia	Egypt	2-0	2-0	Friendly	
12	17 March 1994	El Menzah Stadium, Tunis, Tunisia	Niger	1-0	4-2	Friendly	
13	17 March 1994	El Menzah Stadium, Tunis, Tunisia	Niger	3-0	4-2	Friendly	
14	30 March 1994	El Menzah Stadium, Tunis, Tunisia	Zaire	1-0	1-1	1994 African Cup of Nations	
15	4 February 1998	Stade Modibo Kéïta, Bamako, Mali	Mali	1-0	1-0	Friendly	
16	22 January 1999	Stade du 5 Juillet, Algiers, Algeria	Algeria	1-0	1-0	2000 African Cup of Nations qualification	
17	28 February 1999	El Menzah Stadium, Tunis, Tunisia	Uganda	5-0	6-0	2000 African Cup of Nations qualification	
18	10 April 1999	Nakivubo Stadium, Kampala, Uganda	Uganda	2-0	2-0	2000 African Cup of Nations qualification	
