= Mohamed Akid =

Tunisian footballer

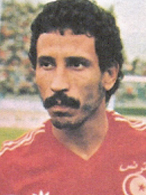
- Mohamed Akid in 1978

Personal information
- Full name: Mohamed Ali Akid
- Date of birth: 5 July 1949
- Place of birth: Sfax, Tunisia
- Date of death: 11 April 1979 (aged 29)
- Place of death: Riyadh, Saudi Arabia
- Height: 1.79 m (5 ft 10 in)
- Position: Forward

Senior career*
Years	Team	Apps	(Gls)
1967–1978	CS Sfaxien	307	(126)
1978–1979	Al-Riyadh		

International career
1970–1979	Tunisia	52	(15)
- * Club domestic league appearances and goals

Mohamed Ali Akid (5 July 1949 – 11 April 1979) was a Tunisian football forward who played for the Tunisia national team. He was part of the Tunisian squad that participated in the 1978 FIFA World Cup. Akid also played for CS Sfaxien and Al-Riyadh.

The circumstances surrounding the death have fuelled a controversy between his surviving family and the authorities. His family requested an autopsy, which was conducted on July 18, 2012, to determine the cause of his death and confirmed the presence of two shots in his body and the son of Akid confirmed the implication of the Crown prince Nayef bin Abdulaziz Al Saud. The official version was that Akid was struck by lightning during a training session at his Saudi Arabian club Al-Riyadh on 11 April 1979.
