= Ali Ben Neji =

Tunisian footballer

Personal information
- Date of birth: 26 September 1961 (age 65)
- Place of birth: Tunisia
- Position: Defender

Senior career*
Years	Team	Apps	(Gls)
1981–1997	ES Tunis	320	(39)

International career
1983–1996	Tunisia	58	(2)
- * Club domestic league appearances and goals

Ali Ben Neji (born 26 September 1961) is a Tunisian former footballer who played for the Tunisia national team as a defender. He competed in the men's tournament at the 1988 Summer Olympics.
