= Issam Jemâa =

Tunisian footballer

Personal information
- Date of birth: 28 January 1984 (age 42)
- Place of birth: Gabès, Tunisia
- Height: 1.85 m (6 ft 1 in)
- Position: Forward

Youth career
- 1995–2003: CO Mednine

Senior career*
Years	Team	Apps	(Gls)
2003–2005	Espérance	49	(17)
2005–2011	Lens	114	(20)
2007–2008	→ Caen (loan)	21	(3)
2011–2012	Auxerre	7	(2)
2012	→ Brest (loan)	10	(2)
2012–2014	Kuwait SC	38	(27)
2014–2015	Al-Sailiya	26	(11)
2016–2017	Dubai CSC	24	(24)
Total		289	(106)

International career
2005–2014	Tunisia	84	(36)
- * Club domestic league appearances and goals

Issam Jemâa (Arabic: عِصَام جُمْعَة; born 28 January 1984 in Gabès) is a Tunisian former professional footballer who played as a forward. He started his footballing career for Espérance Sportive de Tunis, and was later signed by French side Lens. A Tunisia international from 2005 to 2014, he is the all-time leading scorer of the Tunisia national team.

== International career ==
Jemâa emade his international debut against Botswana on 6 April 2005, in a 3–1 victory during 2006 FIFA World Cup qualification. He subsequently reached the quarter-finals of the Africa Cup of Nations in 2006 and 2008. He was also selected by Roger Lemerre for the 2006 FIFA World Cup, but was replaced by Chaouki Ben Saada due to a knee injury. Furthermore, he took part in the 2010 Africa Cup of Nations.

On 10 October 2010, he scored a goal against Togo in a 2–1 win in Lomé during the qualifiers for the 2012 Africa Cup of Nations qualification, becoming the all-time leading goalscorer for Tunisia national team with 22 goals in 50 appearances. In a match against Malawi, he scored twice, though his team ultimately had to settle for a 2–2 draw. With six goals, he finished as the top scorer in the 2012 Africa Cup of Nations qualification.

== Career statistics ==
=== Club ===
Appearances and goals by club, season and competition
Club	Season	League			National cup		League cup		Continental		Total		Ref.
Club	Season	Division	Apps	Goals	Apps	Goals	Apps	Goals	Apps	Goals	Apps	Goals	Ref.
Lens	2005–06	Ligue 1	6	0	0	0	1	0	9	4	15	4	
Lens	2006–07	Ligue 1	27	3	3	1	1	1	9	4	40	9	
Lens	2008–09	Ligue 2	26	5	0	0	3	2	0	0	29	7	
Lens	2009–10	Ligue 1	29	7	4	2	0	0	0	0	33	9	
Lens	2010–11	Ligue 1	26	5	1	0	1	0	0	0	28	5	
Lens	Total		114	20	8	3	6	3	14	5	142	31	–
Caen (loan)	2007–08	Ligue 1	21	3	0	0	1	0	0	0	22	3	
Auxerre	2011–12	Ligue 1	7	2	0	0	1	0	0	0	8	2	
Brest	2011–12	Ligue 1	10	2	0	0	0	0	0	0	10	2	
Kuwait SC	2012–13	Kuwait Premier League	14	11					10	9	24	20	
Kuwait SC	2013–14	Kuwait Premier League	24	16					13	16	37	32	
Kuwait SC	Total		38	27					23	25	61	52	–
Al-Sailiya SC	2014–15	Qatar Stars League	25	11							25	11	
Al-Sailiya SC	2015–16	Qatar Stars League	1	0							1	0	
Al-Sailiya SC	Total		26	11							26	11	–
Dubai CSC	2015–16	UAE Second Division	11	12							11	12	
Dubai CSC	2016–17	UAE Second Division	13	12							13	12	
Dubai CSC	Total		24	24							24	24	–
Career total			240	89							293	125	–

=== International ===
Appearances and goals by year
National team	Year	Competitive		Friendly		Total	
National team	Year	Apps	Goals	Apps	Goals	Apps	Goals
Tunisia	2005	5	0	3	1	8	1
Tunisia	2006	3	0	4	1	7	1
Tunisia	2007	1	0	7	7	8	7
Tunisia	2008	9	3	4	1	13	4
Tunisia	2009	3	1	4	0	7	2
Tunisia	2010	7	4	3	3	10	7
Tunisia	2011	3	3	3	1	6	4
Tunisia	2012	7	3	5	3	12	6
Tunisia	2013	4	0	5	4	9	4
Tunisia	2014	1	0	3	0	4	0
Total		43	14	41	22	84	36

== Honours ==
Lens

- UEFA Intertoto Cup: 2005
