= Mohamed Ali Mahjoubi =

Tunisian footballer

Personal information
- Date of birth: 28 December 1966 (age 59)
- Height: 1.78 m (5 ft 10 in)
- Position: Midfielder

Senior career*
| Years | Team | Apps | (Gls) |
| 1986–1991 | AS Marsa | | |
| 1991–1993 | Eintracht Braunschweig | 66 | (9) |
| 1993–1996 | Espérance Sportive de Tunis | | |

International career
| 1985 | Tunisia U20 | | |
| 1985–1995 | Tunisia | 86 | (17) |
- * Club domestic league appearances and goals

Mohamed Ali Mahjoubi (Arabic: مُحَمَّد عَلِيّ الْمَحْجُوبِيّ; born 28 December 1966) is a Tunisian former professional footballer who played as a midfielder for the Tunisia national team. He represented Tunisia at the 1994 African Cup of Nations, as well as the 1988 Olympic Games.

== Honours ==
Espérance Sportive de Tunis

- Tunisian Ligue Professionnelle 1: 1993–94
- CAF Champions League: 1994
- CAF Super Cup: 1995

AS Marsa

- Tunisian President Cup: 1983–84, 1989–90
