= Hassen Gabsi =

Tunisian footballer and manager

Personal information
- Date of birth: 23 February 1974 (age 52)
- Place of birth: Tunis, Tunisia
- Height: 1.73 m (5 ft 8 in)
- Position: Right winger

Senior career*
Years	Team	Apps	(Gls)
1994–2001	Espérance Tunis		
2001–2003	Genoa	28	(1)
2003–2004	Espérance Tunis		

International career
1997–2002	Tunisia	52	(13)

Managerial career
- 2012–2013: Grombalia Sports
- 2013: AS Kasserine
- 2013–2014: AS Ariana
- 2014: Grombalia Sports
- 2014–2015: EO Sidi Bouzid
- 2015–2016: FC Hammamet
- 2016: EO Sidi Bouzid
- 2016: EGS Gafsa
- 2016–2017: AS Ariana
- 2017: AS Oued Ellil
- 2017: US Tataouine
- 2017: Olympique Béja
- 2017–2018: Jendouba Sport
- 2018: Sfax Railways Sports
- 2019–2020: AS Rejiche
- 2020–2021: US Ben Guerdane
- 2021: Rafik Sorman
- 2021: AS Gabès
- 2021–2022: US Ben Guerdane
- 2022: AS Gabès
- 2022: EO Sidi Bouzid
- * Club domestic league appearances and goals

Hassen Gabsi (Arabic: حَسَّان الْقَابِسِيّ; born 23 February 1974) is a Tunisian football manager and former player.

== Career ==
Gabsi was born in Tunis. A right winger, he played club football for local side Espérance Sportive de Tunis.

He was a member of the Tunisia national team, and played for the team in the 2002 FIFA World Cup finals. He also participated in the 1996 Summer Olympics in Atlanta.

== Career statistics ==
=== International ===
Scores and results list Tunisia's goal tally first, score column indicates score after each Gabsi goal.

List of international goals scored by Hassen Gabsi
No.	Date	Venue	Opponent	Score	Result	Competition
1	7 August 1997	El Menzah Stadium, Tunis, Tunisia	Zambia	3–0	3–1	1997 LG Cup
2	31 January 1998	El Menzah Stadium, Tunis, Tunisia	Guinea	1–0	4–1	Friendly
3	31 January 1998	El Menzah Stadium, Tunis, Tunisia	Guinea	2–0	4–1	Friendly
4	31 January 1998	El Menzah Stadium, Tunis, Tunisia	Guinea	3–0	4–1	Friendly
5	16 February 1998	Stade Municipal, Ouagadougou, Burkina Faso	Togo	3–1	3–1	1998 Africa Cup of Nations
6	21 February 1998	Stade du 4 Août, Ouagadougou, Tunisia	Burkina Faso	1–1	1–1 (7–8 p)	1998 Africa Cup of Nations
7	10 November 1998	El Menzah Stadium, Tunis, Tunisia	Latvia	1–0	3–0	Friendly
8	28 February 1999	El Menzah Stadium, Tunis, Tunisia	Uganda	6–0	6–0	2000 Africa Cup of Nations qualification
9	10 April 1999	Nakivubo Stadium, Kampala, Uganda	Uganda	1–0	2–0	2000 Africa Cup of Nations qualification
10	31 October 1999	El Menzah Stadium, Tunis, Tunisia	Zambia	2–1	2–1	Friendly
11	7 April 2000	Nouakchott Olympic Stadium, Nouakchott, Mauritania	Mauritania	2–0	2–1	2002 FIFA World Cup qualification
12	11 June 2000	El Menzah Stadium, Tunis, Tunisia	Senegal	1–1	4–1	Friendly
13	7 October 2000	El Menzah Stadium, Tunis, Tunisia	Gabon	3–2	4–2	2002 Africa Cup of Nations qualification
