= Tunisia national football team results (2000–2019) =

This article provides details of international football games played by the Tunisia national football team from 2000 to 2019.

== Results ==
Win Draw Loss Cancelled Fixture

=== 2000 ===
7 January Friendly	Tunisia	7–0	Togo	Tunis, Tunisia
12:00 UTC+1	Sellimi 12', 33'; Azaïez 20'; Kanzari 36', 39'; Boukadida 52'; Baya 68'	Report		Stadium: Stade El Menzah; Attendance: 4,000

23 January 2000 AFCON GS	Nigeria	4–2	Tunisia	Lagos, Nigeria
16:00 UTC+1	Okocha 28', 58'; Ikpeba 71', 77'	Report	Azaiez 49'; Baya 90'	Stadium: National Stadium; Attendance: 80,000; Referee: Alain Sars (France)

29 January 2000 AFCON GS	Tunisia	0–0	Morocco	Lagos, Nigeria
16:00 UTC+1		Report		Stadium: National Stadium; Attendance: 5,000; Referee: Falla N'Doye (Senegal)

3 February 2000 AFCON GS	Tunisia	1–0	Congo	Kano, Nigeria
17:00 UTC+1	Jaïdi 18'	Report		Stadium: Sani Abacha Stadium; Attendance: 12,000; Referee: Ali Bujsaim (United Arab Emirates)

7 February 2000 AFCON QF	Egypt	0–1	Tunisia	Kano, Nigeria
16:00 UTC+1		Report	Badra 22' (pen.)	Stadium: Sani Abacha Stadium; Attendance: 12,000; Referee: Alain Sars (France)

10 February 2000 AFCON SF	Cameroon	3–0	Tunisia	Accra, Ghana
18:30 UTC+1	M'Boma 49', 85'; Eto'o 81'	Report		Stadium: Accra Sports Stadium; Attendance: 6,000; Referee: Ali Bujsaim (United Arab Emirates)

12 February 2000 AFCON 3rd	South Africa	2–2 (a.e.t.) (4–3 p)	Tunisia	Accra, Ghana
16:00 UTC+1	Bartlett 11'; Nomvete 62'	Report	Zitouni 27', 89'	Stadium: Accra Sports Stadium; Attendance: 1,000; Referee: Coffi Codjia (Benin)
	Penalties
	Bartlett (penalty missed); Mkhalele (penalty scored); Ndlanya (penalty missed); Tinkler (penalty scored); Moshoeu (penalty scored); Bapela (penalty scored)		(penalty missed) Chihi; (penalty missed) Jaziri; (penalty scored) Gabsi; (penalty scored) Boukadida; (penalty scored) Badra; (penalty missed) Zitouni

12 March Friendly	United States	1–1	Tunisia	Birmingham, United States
13:30 UTC−6	Olsen 90+2'	Report	Kanzari 78'	Stadium: Legion Field; Attendance: 21,637; Referee: Peter Prendergast (Jamaica)

7 April 2002 World Cup Q	Mauritania	1–2	Tunisia	Nouakchott, Mauritania
17:00 UTC+0	Ould Ely 85'	Report	Jaïdi 65'; Gabsi 76'	Stadium: Stade Olympique; Attendance: 10,000; Referee: Modou Sowe (Gambia)

22 April 2002 World Cup Q	Tunisia	3–0	Mauritania	Tunis, Tunisia
17:00 UTC+1	Sidibé 16' (o.g.); Jaziri 25'; Mhedhebi 49'	Report		Stadium: Stade El Menzah; Attendance: 3,000; Referee: Mourad Bendada (Morocco)

11 June Friendly	Tunisia	4–0	Senegal	Tunis, Tunisia
12:00 UTC+1	Gabsi 55'; Ghodhbane 65'; Mhedhebi 68'; Sellami 85'	Report		Stadium: Stade El Menzah

18 June 2002 World Cup Q	Ivory Coast	2–2	Tunisia	Abidjan, Ivory Coast
16:00 UTC+0	Bakayoko 45+1'; Kalou 53'	Report	Mhedhebi 13'; Ghodhbane 20'	Stadium: Stade Félix Houphouët-Boigny; Attendance: 15,000; Referee: Ahmed Auda (Egypt)

28 June Friendly	Tunisia	2–2	Algeria	Tunis, Tunisia
12:00 UTC+1	Mhedhebi 58', 70'	Report	Abaci 23'; Meçabih 44'	Stadium: Stade Chedly Zouiten; Attendance: 0

8 July 2002 World Cup Q	Tunisia	1–0	Madagascar	Tunis, Tunisia
19:00 UTC+1	Baya 43'	Report		Stadium: Stade El Menzah; Attendance: 6,000; Referee: Olufunmi Orimisan Olaniyan (Nigeria)

3 September 2002 AFCON Q	Kenya	0–0	Tunisia	Nairobi, Kenya
12:00 UTC+3		Report		Stadium: Moi International Sports Centre; Attendance: 20,000; Referee: Mohammed Mahmoud (Somalia)

7 October 2002 AFCON Q	Tunisia	4–2	Gabon	Tunis, Tunisia
12:00 UTC+2	Jaziri 3'; Jaïdi 42'; Gabsi 58'; Thabet 75'	Report	Moubamba 14'; Bito'o 25'	Stadium: Stade El Menzah; Attendance: 4,000; Referee: Karim Daho (Algeria)

15 November Friendly	Tunisia	1–1	Switzerland	Tunis, Tunisia
19:00 UTC+1	Bouazizi 67'	Report	Cantaluppi 20'	Stadium: Stade El Menzah; Attendance: 4,000; Referee: Djamel Eddine Benchana (Algeria)

=== 2001 ===
13 January 2002 AFCON Q	Tunisia	0–1	Morocco	Tunis, Tunisia
12:00 UTC+1			Camacho 49'	Stadium: Stade El Menzah; Attendance: 35,000; Referee: Gamal Al-Ghandour (Egypt)

28 January 2002 World Cup Q	Congo	1–2	Tunisia	Pointe-Noire, Congo
15:00 UTC+1	Bongo 42'	Report	Zitouni 38'; Jaziri 58'	Stadium: Stade Municipal; Attendance: 7,000; Referee: Said Belqola (Morocco)

25 February 2002 World Cup Q	Tunisia	6–0	DR Congo	Tunis, Tunisia
16:00 UTC+1	Zitouni 8', 90'; Jaziri 26', 64'; Kanzari 30'; Baya 84'	Report		Stadium: Stade El Menzah; Attendance: 30,000; Referee: Mohamed Guezzaz (Morocco)

24 March 2002 AFCON Q	Morocco	2–0	Tunisia	Rabat, Morocco
12:00 UTC+2	Chippo 20'; Camacho 60'	Report		Stadium: Prince Moulay Abdellah Stadium; Attendance: 25,000; Referee: Coffi Codjia (Benin)

5 May 2002 World Cup Q	Madagascar	0–2	Tunisia	Antananarivo, Madagascar
14:30 UTC+3		Report	Zitouni 85'; Mhedhebi 90'	Stadium: Mahamasina Municipal Stadium; Attendance: 5,016; Referee: Jean-Claude Labrosse (Seychelles)

20 May 2002 World Cup Q	Tunisia	1–1	Ivory Coast	Tunis, Tunisia
18:00 UTC+1	Jaziri 49'	Report	Bakayoko 33'	Stadium: Stade El Menzah; Attendance: 40,000; Referee: Felix Tangawarima (Zimbabwe)

2 June 2002 AFCON Q	Gabon	1–1	Tunisia	Libreville, Gabon
12:00 UTC+2	Cousin 57'	Report	Jelassi 67'	Stadium: Stade Omar Bongo; Attendance: 16,000; Referee: Chukwujekwu Chukwudi (Nigeria)

17 June 2002 AFCON Q	Tunisia	4–1	Kenya	Tunis, Tunisia
12:00 UTC+1	Zitouni 33', 62'; Jaziri 42', 44'	Report	Mulama 61'	Stadium: Stade El Menzah; Attendance: 20,000; Referee: Kamel Berber (Algeria)

1 July 2002 World Cup Q	Tunisia	6–0	Congo	Tunis, Tunisia
19:00 UTC+1	Badra 28' (pen.); Zitouni 38'; Baya 44', 61'; Mhedhebi 58'; Jelassi 90'	Report		Stadium: Stade El Menzah; Attendance: 25,000; Referee: Said Belqola (Morocco)

15 July 2002 World Cup Q	DR Congo	0–3	Tunisia	Kinshasa, DR Congo
15:30 UTC+1		Report	Badra 14'; Baya 50', 54'	Stadium: Stade des Martyrs; Attendance: 25,000; Referee: Koman Coulibaly (Mali)

28 November Friendly	Tunisia	1–0	Togo	Tunis, Tunisia
12:00 UTC+1	Melki 73'	Report		Stadium: Stade El Menzah

30 December Friendly	Tunisia	7–2	Liberia	Tunis, Tunisia
12:00 UTC+1	Zabi 10', 67', 89'; Kanzari 36' (pen.); Daâssi 77'; Bouazizi 90'	Report	Seator 15', 76'	Stadium: Stade El Menzah; Attendance: 20,000; Referee: Kamel Berber (Algeria)

=== 2002 ===
11 January Friendly	Tunisia	0–1	Cameroon	Tunis, Tunisia
12:00 UTC+1		Report	Suffo 41'	Stadium: Stade El Menzah; Attendance: 42,000; Referee: Roberto Rosetti (Italy)

21 January 2002 AFCON GS	Zambia	0–0	Tunisia	Bamako, Mali
19:00 UTC+0		Report		Stadium: Stade Modibo Kéïta; Attendance: 6,000; Referee: Koman Coulibaly (Mali)

25 January 2002 AFCON GS	Egypt	1–0	Tunisia	Bamako, Mali
15:30 UTC+0	Emam 23'	Report		Stadium: Stade Modibo Kéïta] Attendance: 3,000; Referee: Arturo Daudén Ibáñez (Spain)

31 January 2002 AFCON GS	Senegal	0–0	Tunisia	Kayes, Mali
16:00 UTC+0		Report		Stadium: Stade Abdoulaye Makoro Cissoko; Attendance: 8,000; Referee: Domenico Messina (Italy)

13 March Friendly	Tunisia	0–0	South Korea	Tunis, Tunisia
19:00 UTC+1		Report		Stadium: Stade El Menzah; Attendance: 10,000

27 March Friendly	Tunisia	0–0	Norway	Tunis, Tunisia
19:00 UTC+1		Report		Stadium: Stade El Menzah; Attendance: 10,000; Referee: Jamel Ambaya (Libya)

17 April Friendly	Slovenia	1–0	Tunisia	Ljubljana, Slovenia
20:00 UTC+1	Pavlin 23'	Report		Stadium: Bežigrad Stadium; Attendance: 5,500; Referee: Edo Trivković (Croatia)

26 May Friendly	Denmark	2–1	Tunisia	Wakayama, Japan
15:00 UTC+9	Grønkjær 17'; Sand 67'	Report	Jaziri 63'	Stadium: Kimiidera Park; Attendance: 19,800; Referee: Toshimitsu Yoshida (Japan)

5 June 2002 World Cup GS	Russia	2–0	Tunisia	Kobe, Japan
15:30 UTC+9	Titov 59'; Karpin 64' (pen.)	Report		Stadium: Kobe Wing Stadium; Attendance: 30,957; Referee: Peter Prendergast (Jamaica)

10 June 2002 World Cup GS	Tunisia	1–1	Belgium	Ōita, Japan
18:00 UTC+9	Bouzaiene 17'	Report	Wilmots 13'	Stadium: Ōita Big Eye Stadium; Attendance: 39,700; Referee: Mark Shield (Australia)

14 June 2002 World Cup GS	Tunisia	0–2	Japan	Osaka, Japan
15:30 UTC+9		Report	Morishima 48'; H. Nakata 75'	Stadium: Nagai Stadium; Attendance: 45,213; Referee: Gilles Veissière (France)

21 August Friendly	Tunisia	1–1	France	Tunis, Tunisia
19:00 UTC+1	Zitouni 39'	Report	Silvestre 19'	Stadium: Stade 7 November; Attendance: 60,000; Referee: Cosimo Bolognino (Italy)

12 October Friendly	Portugal	1–1	Tunisia	Lisbon, Portugal
12:00 UTC+1	Pauleta 5'	Report	Zitouni 43'	Stadium: Estádio do Restelo; Attendance: 10,000; Referee: Paul Allaerts (Belgium)

20 November Friendly	Tunisia	0–0	Egypt	Tunis, Tunisia
21:00 UTC+1		Report		Stadium: Stade El Menzah; Referee: Jamel Ambaya (Libya)

=== 2003 ===
12 February Friendly	Tunisia	1–0	Sweden	Tunis, Tunisia
18:00 UTC+1	Braham 49'	Report		Stadium: Stade 7 November; Attendance: 20,000; Referee: Djamel Haimoudi (Algeria)

27 March 2003 Tunis Tournament	Tunisia	2–2	Ghana	Tunis, Tunisia
18:00 UTC+1	Mhedhebi 46'; Missaoui 58'	Report	Amoah 45', 48'	Stadium: Stade 7 November; Attendance: 30,000; Referee: Jamel Ambaya (Libya)

30 March 2003 Tunis Tournament	Tunisia	1–0	Cameroon	Tunis, Tunisia
18:00 UTC+1	Bouazizi 82'	Report		Stadium: Stade 7 November; Attendance: 40,000; Referee: Mohamed Guezzaz (Morocco)

30 April Friendly	Tunisia	1–0	Senegal	Tunis, Tunisia
20:30 UTC+1	Braham 45'	Report		Stadium: Stade 7 November; Attendance: 50,000; Referee: Mohamed Benouza (Algeria)

20 August Friendly	Tunisia	0–0	Guinea	Tunis, Tunisia
17:00 UTC+1		Report		Stadium: Stade 7 November; Attendance: 8,000

10 September Friendly	Tunisia	3–2	Ivory Coast	Tunis, Tunisia
19:00 UTC+1	Chedli 18' (pen.); Melki 69'; Sghaier 83'		B. Kalou 88'; Dindane 90+2' (pen.)	Stadium: Stade El Menzah; Attendance: 17,000; Referee: Touati Djaballah (Algeria)

8 October Friendly	Tunisia	0–1	Japan	Tunis, Tunisia
20:30 UTC+1		Report	Yanagisawa 39'	Stadium: Stade El Menzah; Attendance: 9,000

11 October Friendly	Tunisia	0–0	Morocco	Tunis, Tunisia
20:30 UTC+1		Report		Stadium: Stade El Menzah; Attendance: 13,000; Referee: Bertrand Layec (France)

19 November Friendly	Tunisia	2–0	South Africa	Tunis, Tunisia
20:30 UTC+1	Braham 42'; Ayari 88'	Report		Stadium: Stade El Menzah; Attendance: 12,000; Referee: Badara Diatta (Senegal)

=== 2004 ===
14 January Friendly	Tunisia	2–0	Benin	Djerba, Tunisia
12:00 UTC+1	Jaziri 31'; Haggui 43'	Report		Stadium: Stade Houmt Souk; Attendance: 6,000; Referee: Jamel Ambaya (Libya)

17 January Friendly	Tunisia	2–1	Benin	Sfax, Tunisia
12:00 UTC+1	Santos 80'; Saidi 90+5'	Report	Ahouéya 60'	Stadium: Stade Taïeb Mhiri; Attendance: 22,000; Referee: Jamel Ambaya (Libya)

24 January 2004 AFCON GS	Tunisia	2–1	Rwanda	Tunis, Tunisia
19:30 UTC+1	Jaziri 27'; Santos 57'		Elias 41'	Stadium: Stade 7 November; Attendance: 60,000; Referee: Raphaël Evehe Divine (Cameroon)

28 January 2004 AFCON GS	Tunisia	3–0	DR Congo	Tunis, Tunisia
16:15 UTC+1	Santos 55', 87'; Braham 65'			Stadium: Stade 7 November; Attendance: 60,000; Referee: Jerome Damon (South Africa)

1 February 2004 AFCON GS	Tunisia	1–1	Guinea	Tunis, Tunisia
14:00 UTC+1	Ben Achour 58'	Report	T. Camara 84'	Stadium: Stade 7 November; Attendance: 35,000; Referee: Hailemalek Tessama (Ethiopia)

7 February 2004 AFCON QF	Tunisia	1–0	Senegal	Tunis, Tunisia
17:00 UTC+1	Mnari 65'	Report		Stadium: Stade 7 November; Attendance: 60,000; Referee: Ali Bujsaim (United Arab Emirates)

11 February 2004 AFCON SF	Tunisia	1–1 (a.e.t.) (5–3 p)	Nigeria	Tunis, Tunisia
16:00 UTC+1	Badra 82' (pen.)	Report	Okocha 67' (pen.)	Stadium: Stade 7 November; Attendance: 60,000; Referee: Coffi Codjia (Benin)
	Penalties
	Badra (penalty scored); Santos (penalty scored); Mhedhebi (penalty scored); Ben Achour (penalty scored); Haggui (penalty scored)		(penalty scored) Utaka; (penalty missed) Odemwingie; (penalty scored) Yobo; (penalty scored) Udeze

14 February 2004 AFCON Final	Tunisia	2–1	Morocco	Tunis, Tunisia
14:30 UTC+1	Santos 5'; Jaziri 52'	Report	Mokhtari 38'	Stadium: Stade 7 November; Attendance: 60,000; Referee: Falla N'Doye (Senegal)

31 March Friendly	Tunisia	0–2	Ivory Coast	Tunis, Tunisia
17:00 UTC+1			Drogba 34', 65'	Stadium: Stade 7 November; Attendance: 10,000; Referee: Djamel Haimoudi (Algeria)

28 April Friendly	Tunisia	1–0	Mali	Sfax, Tunisia
17:00 UTC+1	Jedidi 56'	Report		Stadium: Stade Taïeb Mhiri; Attendance: 8,000; Referee: Abdullhakim Shelmani (Libya)

30 May Friendly	Tunisia	0–4	Italy	Tunis, Tunisia
21:00 UTC+1		Report	Bouazizi 15' (o.g.); Cannavaro 26'; Pirlo 85'; Zambrotta 90+1'	Stadium: Stade 7 November; Attendance: 30,000; Referee: Laurent Duhamel (France)

5 June 2006 World Cup Q	Tunisia	4–1	Botswana	Tunis, Tunisia
19:15 UTC+1	Clayton 9'; Haggui 35' 79'; Zitouni 74'	Report	Selolwane 65'	Stadium: Stade 7 November; Attendance: 2,844; Referee: Khalid Abdel Rahman (Sudan)

20 June 2006 World Cup Q	Guinea	2–1	Tunisia	Conakry, Guinea
16:30 UTC+0	Diawara 12' 46'	Report	Braham 67'	Stadium: Stade 28 Septembre; Attendance: 15,300; Referee: Coffi Codjia (Benin)

18 August Friendly	Tunisia	0–2	South Africa	Tunis, Tunisia
20:45 UTC+1		Report	McCarthy 2'; Arendse 82'	Stadium: Stade 7 November; Attendance: 4,000; Referee: Mohamed Zekrini (Algeria)

4 September 2006 World Cup Q	Morocco	1–1	Tunisia	Rabat, Morocco
19:30 UTC+0	El Karkouri 74'	Report	Santos 11'	Stadium: Stade Moulay Abdellah; Attendance: 45,000; Referee: Ahmed Auda (Egypt)

9 October 2006 World Cup Q	Malawi	2–2	Tunisia	Blantyre, Malawi
15:00 UTC+2	Mwafulirwa 19'; Chipatala 37'	Report	Jaziri 82'; Ghodhbane 89'	Stadium: Kamuzu Stadium; Attendance: 20,000; Referee: Yusuf Awuye (Uganda)

=== 2005 ===
26 March 2006 World Cup Q	Tunisia	7–0	Malawi	Tunis, Tunisia
19:15 UTC+1	Guemamdia 3'; Santos 12' 52' 75' 77'; Clayton 60' (pen.); Ghodhbane 80'	Report		Stadium: Stade 7 November; Attendance: 30,000; Referee: Khalid Abdel Rahman (Sudan)

27 May Friendly	Tunisia	4–1	Angola	Tunis, Tunisia
12:00 UTC+1	Zitouni 20', 70'; Mhedhebi 51', 81'	Report	Flávio 78'	Stadium: Stade 7 November; Attendance: 4,000; Referee: Jamel Ambaya (Libya)

4 June 2006 World Cup Q	Botswana	1–3	Tunisia	Gaborone, Botswana
15:00 UTC+2	Gabonamong 12'	Report	Nafti 27'; Santos 43'; Abdy 78'	Stadium: Botswana National Stadium; Attendance: 20,000; Referee: Sule Mana (Nigeria)

11 June 2006 World Cup Q	Tunisia	2–0	Guinea	Tunis, Tunisia
19:15 UTC+1	Clayton 36' (pen.); Chedli 78'	Report		Stadium: Stade 7 November; Attendance: 30,000; Referee: Lim Kee Chong (Mauritius)

15 June 2005 Confederations Cup GS	Argentina	2–1	Tunisia	Cologne, Germany
18:00 UTC+0	Riquelme 33' (pen.); Saviola 57'	Report	Guemamdia 72' (pen.)	Stadium: RheinEnergieStadion; Attendance: 28,033; Referee: Roberto Rosetti (Italy)

18 June 2005 Confederations Cup GS	Tunisia	0–3	Germany	Cologne, Germany
18:00 UTC+0		Report	Ballack 74' (pen.); Schweinsteiger 80'; Hanke 88'	Stadium: RheinEnergieStadion; Attendance: 44,377; Referee: Peter Prendergast (Jamaica)

21 June 2005 Confederations Cup GS	Australia	0–2	Tunisia	Leipzig, Germany
20:45 UTC+0		Report	Santos 26', 70'	Stadium: Zentralstadion; Attendance: 23,952; Referee: Carlos Chandía (Chile)

17 August 2006 World Cup Q	Tunisia	1–0	Kenya	Tunis, Tunisia
20:45 UTC+1	Guemamdia 2'	Report		Stadium: Stade 7 November; Attendance: 60,000; Referee: Divine Evehe (Cameroon)

3 September 2006 World Cup Q	Kenya	0–2	Tunisia	Nairobi, Kenya
16:00 UTC+3		Report	Guemamdia 2'; Jemâa 85'	Stadium: Moi International Sports Centre; Attendance: 0 Referee: Modou Sowe (Gambia)

8 October 2006 World Cup Q	Tunisia	2–2	Morocco	Tunis, Tunisia
20:45 UTC+1	Clayton 18' (pen.); Chedli 69'	Report	Chamakh 3'; El Karkouri 42'	Stadium: Stade 7 November; Attendance: 60,000; Referee: Essam Abdel-Fatah (Egypt)

11 November Friendly	Tunisia	2–2	DR Congo	Paris, France
19:30 UTC+1	Ben Saada 28'; Santos 65'		Mputu 19'; Lutula 57'	Stadium: Stade Sébastien Charléty; Attendance: 18,000; Referee: Alain Garibian (France)

16 November Friendly	Egypt	1–2	Tunisia	Cairo, Egypt
18:00 UTC+2	Mido 49'	Report	Guemamdia 57', 60'	Stadium: Osman Ahmed Osman Stadium; Attendance: 20,000; Referee: Fareed Al-Marzouqi (United Arab Emirates)

=== 2006 ===
12 January Friendly	Tunisia	1–0	Libya	Tunis, Tunisia
20:15 UTC+1	Ltifi 73'	Report		Stadium: Stade 7 November; Attendance: 17,000

15 January Friendly	Tunisia	2–0	Ghana	Tunis, Tunisia
12:00 UTC+1	Melliti 60'; Ghodhbane 76'	Report		Stadium: Stade 7 November; Attendance: 10,000

22 January 2006 AFCON GS	Tunisia	4–1	Zambia	Alexandria, Egypt
17:15 UTC+2	Santos 35', 82', 90+3'; Bouazizi 53'		Chamanga 9'	Stadium: Harras El-Hedoud Stadium; Attendance: 16,000; Referee: Eddy Maillet (Seychelles)

26 January 2006 AFCON GS	Tunisia	2–0	South Africa	Alexandria, Egypt
20:00 UTC+2	Santos 32'; Ben Achour 58'			Stadium: Harras El-Hedoud Stadium; Attendance: 10,000; Referee: Evehe Divine (Cameroon)

30 January 2006 AFCON GS	Tunisia	0–3	Guinea	Alexandria, Egypt
19:00 UTC+2			O. Bangoura 16'; Feindouno 70'; Diawara 90+1'	Stadium: Harras El-Hedoud Stadium; Attendance: 18,000; Referee: Shamsul Maidin (Singapore)

4 February 2006 AFCON QF	Nigeria	1–1 (a.e.t.) (6–5 p)	Tunisia	Port Said, Egypt
15:00 UTC+2	Obinna 6'	Report	Haggui 49'	Stadium: Port Said Stadium; Attendance: 10,000; Referee: Eddy Maillet (Seychelles)
	Penalties
	Yobo (penalty missed); Taiwo (penalty scored); Ayila (penalty missed); Obinna (penalty scored); Martins (penalty scored); Mikel (penalty scored); Enyeama (penalty scored); Kanu (penalty scored)		(penalty scored) Namouchi; (penalty scored) Guemamdia; (penalty missed) Chedli; (penalty missed) Ben Achour; (penalty scored) Clayton; (penalty scored) Boumnijel; (penalty scored) Hadj Massaoud; (penalty missed) Bouazizi

1 March Friendly	Tunisia	0–1	Serbia and Montenegro	Tunis, Tunisia
19:15 UTC+1		Report	Kežman 11'	Stadium: Stade 7 November; Attendance: 15,000; Referee: Djamel Haimoudi (Algeria)

30 May 2006 LG Cup	Tunisia	3–0	Belarus	Tunis, Tunisia
19:30 UTC+2	Namouchi 34' (pen.); Dos Santos 46'; Jemâa 90+3'	Report		Stadium: Stade 7 November; Attendance: 20,000; Referee: Kacem Bennaceur (Tunisia)

2 June 2006 LG Cup	Tunisia	0–0 (1–3 p)	Uruguay	Tunis, Tunisia
19:30 UTC+2		Report		Stadium: Stade 7 November; Attendance: 25,000; Referee: Nasser Abbes Kabil (Egypt)
	Penalties
	Mnari (penalty missed); Ghodhbane (penalty scored); Bouazizi (penalty missed); Meriah (penalty missed)		(penalty scored) Scotti; (penalty missed) Olivera; (penalty scored) Estoyanoff; (penalty scored) Giacomazzi

14 June 2006 World Cup GS	Tunisia	2–2	Saudi Arabia	Munich, Germany
18:00 UTC+2	Jaziri 23'; Jaïdi 90+2'	Report	Al-Qahtani 57'; Al-Jaber 84'	Stadium: Allianz Arena; Attendance: 66,000; Referee: Mark Shield (Australia)

19 June 2006 World Cup GS	Spain	3–1	Tunisia	Stuttgart, Germany
21:00 UTC+2	Raúl 71'; Torres 76', 90+1' (pen.)	Report	Mnari 8'	Stadium: Gottlieb-Daimler-Stadion; Attendance: 52,000; Referee: Carlos Simon (Brazil)

23 June 2006 World Cup GS	Ukraine	1–0	Tunisia	Berlin, Germany
16:00 UTC+2	Shevchenko 70' (pen.)	Report		Stadium: Olympiastadion; Attendance: 72,000; Referee: Carlos Amarilla (Paraguay)

16 August Friendly	Tunisia	0–1	Mali	Narbonne, France
19:00 UTC+2		Report	Kanouté 36' (pen.)	Stadium: Parc des Sports et de l'Amitié

3 September 2008 AFCON Q	Mauritius	0–0	Tunisia	Curepipe, Mauritius
15:00 UTC+3				Stadium: Stade George V Attendance: 2,873; Referee: Andile Ncobo (South Africa)

7 October 2008 AFCON Q	Tunisia	1–0	Sudan	Tunis, Tunisia
20:00 UTC+2	Richard 79' (o.g.)			Stadium: Stade 7 November; Attendance: 25,000

15 November Friendly	Tunisia	2–0	Libya	Tunis, Tunisia
19:15 UTC+1	Lachkham 15'; Zouaghi 55'	Report		Stadium: Stade 7 November; Attendance: 5,000; Referee: Mohamed Zekrini (Algeria)

=== 2007 ===
7 February Friendly	Morocco	1–1	Tunisia	Rabat, Morocco
20:30 UTC+0	Chamakh 29'	Report	Jemâa 62'	Stadium: Stade Moulay Abdellah; Attendance: 20,000; Referee: Fahim Omar (Egypt)

24 March 2008 AFCON Q	Seychelles	0–3	Tunisia	Victoria, Seychelles
13:00 UTC+3			Jemâa 16', 76', 80'	Stadium: Stade Linité; Attendance: 7,000

2 June 2008 AFCON Q	Tunisia	4–0	Seychelles	Tunis, Tunisia
20:45 UTC+2	Jemâa 25'; Zaiem 41', 66'; Chermiti 81'			Stadium: Stade 7 November; Attendance: 5,000; Referee: Badara Diatta (Senegal)

16 June 2008 AFCON Q	Tunisia	2–0	Mauritius	Tunis, Tunisia
19:10 UTC+2	Jemâa 44'; Nafti 60'			Stadium: Stade 7 November

22 August Friendly	Tunisia	1–1	Guinea	Tunis, Tunisia
19:10 UTC+2	Mnari 23'	Report	Diawara 45'	Stadium: Stade 7 November; Attendance: 15,000; Referee: Mohamed Benouza (Algeria)

9 September 2008 AFCON Q	Sudan	3–2	Tunisia	Omdurman, Sudan
19:30 UTC+2	Alaa Eldin Babiker 26'; Agab 61' (pen.); Mousa 72'		Nafti 55'; Santos 82' (pen.)	Stadium: Al-Merrikh Stadium; Attendance: 43,000

17 October Friendly	United Arab Emirates	0–1	Tunisia	Abu Dhabi, United Arab Emirates
19:00 UTC+4		Report	Belaïd 28'	Stadium: Mohammed bin Zayed Stadium; Attendance: 10,000; Referee: Saad Kamil (Kuwait)

17 November Friendly	Tunisia	2–0	Namibia	Tunis, Tunisia
17:00 UTC+1	Yahia 57'; Jemâa 76'	Report		Stadium: Stade 7 November; Attendance: 5,000; Referee: Wahid Salah Tamuni (Libya)

21 November Friendly	Austria	0–0	Tunisia	Vienna, Austria
20:30 UTC+1		Report		Stadium: Ernst-Happel-Stadion; Attendance: 13,800; Referee: Pavel Olsiak (Slovakia)

=== 2008 ===
6 January Friendly	Tunisia	1–2	Zambia	Tunis, Tunisia
18:00 UTC+1	Chikhaoui 48'	Report	Katongo 7', 9'	Stadium: Stade 7 November; Attendance: 12,000; Referee: Mohamed Bichari (Algeria)

8 January Friendly	Tunisia	1–0	Zambia	Tunis, Tunisia
18:00 UTC+1	Chikhaoui 79'	Report		Stadium: Stade 7 November; Attendance: 30,000; Referee: Mohamed Bichari (Algeria)

23 January 2008 AFCON GS	Tunisia	2–2	Senegal	Tamale, Ghana
17:00 UTC+0	Jemâa 9'; Traoui 82'	Report	Bayal Sall 45'; Kamara 66'	Stadium: Tamale Stadium; Attendance: 12,000; Referee: Yuichi Nishimura (Japan)

27 January 2008 AFCON GS	Tunisia	3–1	South Africa	Tamale, Ghana
19:30 UTC+0	Santos 8', 34'; Ben Saada 32'	Report	Mphela 87'	Stadium: Tamale Stadium; Attendance: 15,000; Referee: Kokou Djaoupe (Togo)

31 January 2008 AFCON GS	Tunisia	0–0	Angola	Tamale, Ghana
17:00 UTC+0		Report		Stadium: Tamale Stadium; Attendance: 10,000; Referee: Coffi Codjia (Benin)

4 February 2008 AFCON QF	Tunisia	2–3 (a.e.t.)	Cameroon	Tamale, Ghana
20:30 UTC+0	Ben Saada 34'; Chikhaoui 81'	Report	Mbia 18', 93'; Geremi 27'	Stadium: Tamale Stadium; Attendance: 15,000; Referee: Koman Coulibaly (Mali)

26 March Friendly	Tunisia	2–0	Ivory Coast	Bondoufle, France
19:00 UTC+1	Felhi 54'; Belaïd 85'		Report	Stadium: Stade Robert Bobin; Attendance: 10,000; Referee: Benoît Millot (France)

1 June 2010 World Cup Q	Tunisia	1–2	Burkina Faso	Tunis, Tunisia
19:10 UTC+2	Belaid 38'	Report	Koné 85', 87'	Stadium: Stade 7 November; Attendance: 15,000; Referee: Jamel Ambaya (Libya)

7 June 2010 World Cup Q	Seychelles	0–2	Tunisia	Victoria, Seychelles
16:30 UTC+4		Report	Jemâa 10'; Ben Saada 43'	Stadium: Stade Linité; Attendance: 2,033; Referee: Justino Faduco (Mozambique)

15 June 2010 World Cup Q	Burundi	0–1	Tunisia	Bujumbura, Burundi
15:00 UTC+2		Report	Jaïdi 66'	Stadium: Prince Louis Rwagasore Stadium; Attendance: 7,000; Referee: Jerome Damon (South Africa)

21 June 2010 World Cup Q	Tunisia	2–1	Burundi	Tunis, Tunisia
20:30 UTC+2	Ben Saada 30' (pen.); Jemâa 44'	Report	Mbazumutima 45'	Stadium: Stade 7 November; Attendance: 6,000; Referee: Yasser Younes (Egypt)

20 August Friendly	Tunisia	1–1	Angola	Monastir, Tunisia
17:30 UTC+2	Chermiti 37'	Report	Carlos 90+2'	Stadium: Stade Mustapha Ben Jannet; Attendance: 6,000; Referee: Mohamed Bichari (Algeria)

6 September 2010 World Cup Q	Burkina Faso	0–0	Tunisia	Ouagadougou, Burkina Faso
18:00 UTC+0		Report		Stadium: Stade du 4 Août; Attendance: 10,000; Referee: Mathews Katjimune (Namibia)

11 October 2010 World Cup Q	Tunisia	5–0	Seychelles	Tunis, Tunisia
17:00 UTC+2	Essifi 5', 68'; Mikari 18'; Ben Frej 20'; Ben Khalfallah 43'	Report		Stadium: Stade 7 November; Attendance: 10,000; Referee: Badara Diatta (Senegal)

14 October Friendly	France	3–1	Tunisia	Saint-Denis, France
21:00 UTC+1	Henry 40', 48'; Benzema 58'	Report	Jemâa 30'	Stadium: Stade de France; Attendance: 74,564; Referee: Anton Genov (Bulgaria)

19 November Friendly	Ghana	0–0	Tunisia	Accra, Ghana
18:45 UTC+0		Report		Stadium: Accra Sports Stadium; Attendance: 20,030; Referee: Kokou Djaoupe (Togo)

=== 2009 ===
11 February Friendly	Tunisia	1–1	Netherlands	Tunis, Tunisia
20:30 UTC+1	Saihi 66'	Report	Huntelaar 62'	Stadium: Stade 7 November; Attendance: 17,000; Referee: Essam Abdel-Fatah (Egypt)

28 March 2010 World Cup Q	Kenya	1–2	Tunisia	Nairobi, Kenya
16:00 UTC+3	Oliech 70'	Report	Jemal 6'; Jemâa 79'	Stadium: Nyayo National Stadium; Attendance: 27,000; Referee: Divine Evehe (Cameroon)

28 May Friendly	Tunisia	4–0	Sudan	Tunis, Tunisia
20:10 UTC+1	Darragi 11'; Allagui 17'; Jaïdi 21'; Felhi 65'	Report		Stadium: Stade 7 November; Referee: Mohamed Ragab (Libya)

6 June 2010 World Cup Q	Tunisia	2–0	Mozambique	Tunis, Tunisia
18:00 UTC+1	Ben Yahia 21' (pen.); Darragi 90+1'	Report		Stadium: Stade 7 November; Attendance: 30,000; Referee: Kokou Djaoupe (Togo)

20 June 2010 World Cup Q	Tunisia	0–0	Nigeria	Tunis, Tunisia
19:10 UTC+1		Report		Stadium: Stade 7 November; Attendance: 45,000; Referee: Koman Coulibaly (Mali)

12 August Friendly	Tunisia	0–0	Ivory Coast	Sousse, Tunisia
20:10 UTC+1		Report		Stadium: Stade Olympique de Sousse; Attendance: 20,000

6 September 2010 World Cup Q	Nigeria	2–2	Tunisia	Abuja, Nigeria
17:00 UTC+1	Odemwingie 23'; Eneramo 80'	Report	Taïder 24'; Darragi 89'	Stadium: Abuja Stadium; Attendance: 52,000; Referee: Daniel Bennett (South Africa)

11 October 2010 World Cup Q	Tunisia	1–0	Kenya	Tunis, Tunisia
17:00 UTC+1	Jemâa 1'	Report		Stadium: Stade 7 November; Attendance: 50,000; Referee: Badara Diatta (Senegal)

14 October Friendly	Tunisia	0–1	Saudi Arabia	Tunis, Tunisia
19:00 UTC+1		Report	Al-Shamrani 2'	Stadium: Stade 7 November; Referee: Mokhtar Amalou (Algeria)

14 November 2010 World Cup Q	Mozambique	1–0	Tunisia	Maputo, Mozambique
15:00 UTC+2	Dário 83'	Report		Stadium: Estádio da Machava; Attendance: 30,000; Referee: Noumandiez Doué (Ivory Coast)

=== 2010 ===
9 January Friendly	Tunisia	1–2	Gambia	Tunis, Tunisia
15:00 UTC+1	Chermiti 90+4'	Report	Ninge 57'; Nyassi 85'	Stadium: Stade El Menzah; Attendance: 8,000

13 January 2010 AFCON GS	Zambia	1–1	Tunisia	Lubango, Angola
19:30 UTC+1	J. Mulenga 19'	Report	Dhaouadi 40'	Stadium: Estádio Nacional da Tundavala; Attendance: 17,000; Referee: Koman Coulibaly (Mali)

17 January 2010 AFCON GS	Gabon	0–0	Tunisia	Lubango, Angola
17:00 UTC+1		Report		Stadium: Estádio Nacional da Tundavala; Attendance: 16,000; Referee: Coffi Codjia (Benin)

21 January 2010 AFCON GS	Cameroon	2–2	Tunisia	Lubango, Angola
17:00 UTC+1	Eto'o 47'; N'Guémo 64'	Report	Chermiti 1'; Chedjou 63' (o.g.)	Stadium: Estádio Nacional da Tundavala; Attendance: 19,000; Referee: Noumandiez Doué (Ivory Coast)

30 May Friendly	Tunisia	1–1	France	Tunis, Tunisia
20:00 UTC+1	Jemâa 6'	Report	Gallas 63'	Stadium: Stade 7 November; Attendance: 55,000; Referee: Adel Errai (Libya)

20 June Friendly	Sudan	2–6	Tunisia	Khartoum, Sudan
19:15 UTC+2	Al-Madina 66'; Tambal 82'	Report	Ben Yahia 10'; Allagui 37'; Haggui 46'; Jemâa 55', 57'; Akaichi 70'	Stadium: Khartoum Stadium; Attendance: 20,000

1 July 2012 AFCON Q	Tunisia	0–1	Botswana	Tunis, Tunisia
19:15 UTC+1		Report	Ramatlhakwane 31'	Stadium: Stade El Menzah; Attendance: 5,000; Referee: Badara Diatta (Senegal)

11 August 2012 AFCON Q	Chad	1–3	Tunisia	N'Djamena, Chad
15:00 UTC+1	Ndouassel 75'	Report	Korbi 9'; Ben Khalfallah 43', 81'	Stadium: Stade Nacional; Referee: Normandiez Doue (Ivory Coast)

4 September 2012 AFCON Q	Tunisia	2–2	Malawi	Tunis, Tunisia
21:30 UTC+1	Jemâa 11', 27'	Report	Msowoya 45'; Kanyenda 82' (pen.)	Stadium: Stade 7 November; Attendance: 30,000; Referee: Joseph Lamptey (Ghana)

10 October 2012 AFCON Q	Togo	1–2	Tunisia	Lomé, Togo
15:30 UTC+0	Mani 40'	Report	Jemâa 38'; Chermiti 83'	Stadium: Stade de Kégué; Referee: Khalid Abdel Rahman (Sudan)

17 November 2012 AFCON Q	Botswana	1–0	Tunisia	Gaborone, Botswana
16:00 UTC+1	Ramatlhakwane 45'	Report		Stadium: University of Botswana Stadium; Referee: Wellington Kaoma (Zambia)

=== 2011 ===
29 March Friendly	Oman	2–1	Tunisia	Seeb, Oman
17:00 UTC+4	Kano 9' (pen.), 85' (pen.)	Report	Allagui 63'	Stadium: Al-Seeb Stadium; Attendance: 8,000

29 May Friendly	Tunisia	3–0	Central Africa	Sousse, Tunisia
17:00 UTC+1	Darragi 32', 50'; Chehoudi 45+1'	Report		Stadium: Stade Olympique de Sousse; Attendance: 5,000

5 June 2012 AFCON Q	Tunisia	5–0	Chad	Sousse, Tunisia
18:00 UTC+1	Jemâa 22', 44', 53'; Abdennour 35'; Darragi 47'	Report		Stadium: Stade Olympique de Sousse; Attendance: 10,000

10 August Friendly	Tunisia	4–2	Mali	Monastir, Tunisia
22:15 UTC+1	Allagui 19', 49'; Jemal 27'; Jemâa 82'	Report	Maïga 44'; Diabaté 83'	Stadium: Stade Mustapha Ben Jannet; Attendance: 20,000

22 August Friendly	Jordan	3–3	Tunisia	Amman, Jordan
21:30 UTC+3	Deeb 20', 52'; Hayel 47'	Report	Jemal 30' (pen.), 79' (pen.); Chehoudi 32'	Stadium: Amman International Stadium; Attendance: 5,000

3 September 2012 AFCON Q	Malawi	0–0	Tunisia	Blantyre, Malawi
14:30 UTC+2		Report		Stadium: Kamuzu Stadium; Attendance: 40,000; Referee: Eddy Maillet (Seychelles)

8 October 2012 AFCON Q	Tunisia	2–0	Togo	Tunis, Tunisia
16:00 UTC+1	Hichri 19'; Khelifa 79'	Report		Stadium: Stade 7 November; Attendance: 5,000; Referee: Djamel Haimoudi (Algeria)

12 November Friendly	Algeria	1–0	Tunisia	Blida, Algeria
18:00 UTC+1	Boudebouz 42'	Report		Stadium: Mustapha Tchaker Stadium; Attendance: 25,000

=== 2012 ===
9 January Friendly	Tunisia	3–0	Sudan	Sharjah, United Arab Emirates
17:00 UTC+4	Khalifa 12'; Dhaouadi 60'; Chermiti 82'	Report		Stadium: Sharjah Stadium; Attendance: 2,000

13 January Friendly	Tunisia	0–2	Ivory Coast	Abu Dhabi, United Arab Emirates
18:00 UTC+4		Report	Kalou 43'; Drogba 47'	Stadium: Zayed Sports City Stadium; Attendance: 5,000; Referee: Ammar Al-Junaibi (United Arab Emirates)

23 January 2012 AFCON GS	Morocco	1–2	Tunisia	Libreville, Gabon
20:00 UTC+1	Kharja 86'	Report	Korbi 34'; Msakni 76'	Stadium: Stade d'Angondjé; Attendance: 28,000; Referee: Daniel Bennett (South Africa)

27 January 2012 AFCON GS	Niger	1–2	Tunisia	Libreville, Gabon
17:00 UTC+1	N'Gounou 9'	Report	Msakni 4'; Jemâa 89'	Stadium: Stade d'Angondjé; Attendance: 20,000; Referee: Janny Sikazwe (Zambia)

31 January 2012 AFCON GS	Gabon	1–0	Tunisia	Franceville, Gabon
19:00 UTC+1	Aubameyang 61'	Report		Stadium: Stade de Franceville; Attendance: 22,000; Referee: Noumandiez Doué (Ivory Coast)

5 February 2012 AFCON QF	Ghana	2–1 (a.e.t.)	Tunisia	Franceville, Gabon
20:00 UTC+1	John Mensah 9'; A. Ayew 100'	Report	Khelifa 41'	Stadium: Stade de Franceville; Attendance: 8,000; Referee: Néant Alioum (Cameroon)

29 February Friendly	Tunisia	1–1	Peru	Tunis, Tunisia
18:00 UTC+1	Ben Yahia 45'	Report	Pizarro 45+2' (pen.)	Stadium: Stade El Menzah; Attendance: 5,000; Referee: Cecil Fleischer (Ghana)

27 May Friendly	Tunisia	5–1	Rwanda	Monastir, Tunisia
19:00 UTC+1	Jemal 17'; Harbaoui 50', 52'; Jemâa 67'; Saihi 78'	Report	Etekiama 57'	Stadium: Stade Mustapha Ben Jannet; Attendance: 14,000; Referee: Mounir Rahmani (Morocco)

2 June 2014 World Cup Q	Tunisia	3–1	Equatorial Guinea	Monastir, Tunisia
18:00 UTC+1	Jemâa 51'; Hammami 56', 86'	Report	Randy 34'	Stadium: Stade Mustapha Ben Jannet; Attendance: 10,000; Referee: Mehdi Abid Charef (Algeria)

9 June 2014 World Cup Q	Cape Verde	1–2	Tunisia	Praia, Cape Verde
16:30 UTC−1	Odaïr Fortes 26'	Report	Khelifa 14'; Jemâa 46'	Stadium: Estádio da Várzea; Attendance: 3,600; Referee: Rédouane Jiyed (Morocco)

15 August Friendly	Tunisia	2–2	Iran	Kecskemét, Hungary
17:30 UTC+1	Jemal 56'; Jemâa 83'	Report	Khalatbari 53'; Ghazi 60'	Stadium: Széktói Stadion; Attendance: 200; Referee: Mihály Fábián (Hungary)

8 September 2013 AFCON Q	Sierra Leone	2–2	Tunisia	Freetown, Sierra Leone
16:30 UTC+0	Suma 8'; A. Kamara 85'	Report	Gharbi 65'; Msakni 87'	Stadium: National Stadium; Attendance: 45,000; Referee: Khalid Abdelrahman (Sudan)

13 October 2013 AFCON Q	Tunisia	0–0	Sierra Leone	Monastir, Tunisia
19:15 UTC+1		Report		Stadium: Stade Mustapha Ben Jannet; Attendance: 20,000; Referee: Ali Lemghaifry (Mauritania)

16 October Friendly	Egypt	0–1	Tunisia	Abu Dhabi, United Arab Emirates
19:00 UTC+4		Report	Dhaouadi 19'	Stadium: Zayed Sports City Stadium; Attendance: 20,000; Referee: Ammar Al-Junaibi (United Arab Emirates)

14 November Friendly	Tunisia	1–2	Switzerland	Sousse, Tunisia
18:15 UTC+1	Dhaouadi 59'	Report	Derdiyok 39'; Shaqiri 90+5'	Stadium: Stade Olympique de Sousse; Attendance: 3,000; Referee: Helmut Fleischer (Germany)

30 December Friendly	Iraq	1–2	Tunisia	Sharjah, United Arab Emirates
16:30 UTC+4	Y. Mahmoud 88'	Report	Jemâa 47'; F. Ben Youssef 58'	Stadium: Sharjah Stadium; Attendance: 1,000

=== 2013 ===
7 January Friendly	Tunisia	1–1	Ethiopia	Al-Wakrah, Qatar
15:00 UTC+3	Darragi 4' (pen.)	Report	Said 64'	Stadium: Saoud bin Abdulrahman Stadium; Attendance: 5,000

10 January Friendly	Tunisia	1–1	Gabon	Abu Dhabi, United Arab Emirates
14:10 UTC+4	Khalifa 14'	Report	Lengoualama 51'	Stadium: Zayed Sports City Stadium; Attendance: 200; Referee: Ammar Al-Junaibi (United Arab Emirates)

13 January Friendly	Tunisia	2–4	Ghana	Abu Dhabi, United Arab Emirates
17:30 UTC+4	Jemâa 19', 52'	Report	Boye 63'; Wakaso 68'; Gyan 78'; Adomah 88'	Stadium: Zayed Sports City Stadium; Attendance: 2,000

22 January 2013 AFCON GS	Tunisia	1–0	Algeria	Rustenburg, South Africa
20:00 UTC+2	Msakni 90+1'	Report		Stadium: Royal Bafokeng Stadium; Attendance: 10,000; Referee: Bakary Gassama (Gambia)

26 January 2013 AFCON GS	Ivory Coast	3–0	Tunisia	Rustenburg, South Africa
17:00 UTC+2	Gervinho 21'; Y. Touré 87'; Ya Konan 90'	Report		Stadium: Royal Bafokeng Stadium; Attendance: 20,000; Referee: Rajindraparsad Seechurn (Mauritius)

30 January 2013 AFCON GS	Togo	1–1	Tunisia	Nelspruit, South Africa
19:00 UTC+2	Gakpé 13'	Report	Mouelhi 30' (pen.)	Stadium: Mbombela Stadium; Attendance: 7,500; Referee: Daniel Bennett (South Africa)

23 March 2014 World Cup Q	Tunisia	2–1	Sierra Leone	Tunis, Tunisia
19:10 UTC+1	Darragi 57'; Khazri 72'	Report	A. Kamara 74'	Stadium: Stade Olympique de Radès; Attendance: 10,000; Referee: Mal Mohamadou (Cameroon)

8 June 2014 World Cup Q	Sierra Leone	2–2	Tunisia	Freetown, Sierra Leone
16:30 UTC+0	K. Kamara 38'; Suma 70'	Report	Darragi 55' (pen.); Ben Youssef 89'	Stadium: National Stadium; Attendance: 20,000; Referee: Eric Otogo-Castane (Gabon)

16 June 2014 World Cup Q	Equatorial Guinea	1–1	Tunisia	Malabo, Equatorial Guinea
17:00 UTC+1	Juvenal 36' (pen.)	Report	Darragi 64' (pen.)	Stadium: Estadio de Malabo; Attendance: 8,000; Referee: Bernard Camille (Seychelles)

14 August Friendly	Tunisia	3–0	Congo	Tunis, Tunisia
21:00 UTC+1	Khazri 7'; Jemâa 13', 83'	Report		Stadium: Stade Olympique de Radès; Attendance: 4,000; Referee: Mokhtar Amalou (Algeria)

7 September 2014 World Cup Q	Tunisia	3–0; Awarded (Note: FIFA awarded Tunisia a 3–0 win as a result of Cape Verde fielding the player Fernando Varela, who had been sent off in the match against Equatorial Guinea on 24 March 2013. As a result of his sending off for unsporting conduct towards a match official, Varela had been given a four match suspension and would miss the rest of the qualifying campaign plus one further FIFA game. Varela did not participate in the games against Equatorial Guinea on 8 June 2013 or the game against Sierra Leone on 16 June 2013. Complicating matters, Varela's red card against Equatorial Guinea was removed from the FIFA.com website. The match originally ended 2–0 to Cape Verde.)	Cape Verde	Tunis, Tunisia
19:45 UTC+1		Report	Platini 28'; Héldon 42'	Stadium: Stade Olympique de Radès; Attendance: 9,000; Referee: Bakary Gassama (Gambia)

13 October 2014 World Cup Q	Tunisia	0–0	Cameroon	Tunis, Tunisia
18:00 UTC+1		Report		Stadium: Stade Olympique de Radès; Attendance: 50,000; Referee: Koman Coulibaly (Mali)

17 November 2014 World Cup Q	Cameroon	4–1	Tunisia	Yaoundé, Cameroon
15:00 UTC+1	Webó 3'; Moukandjo 29'; Makoun 65', 85'	Report	Akaïchi 50'	Stadium: Stade Ahmadou Ahidjo; Attendance: 35,570; Referee: Rajindraparsad Seechurn (Mauritius)

=== 2014 ===
5 March Friendly	Colombia	1–1	Tunisia	Barcelona, Spain
19:00 UTC+1	Rodríguez 20' (pen.)	Report	Khazri 35'	Stadium: Estadi Cornellà-El Prat; Attendance: 5,000; Referee: Xavier Estrada Fernández (Spain)

28 May Friendly	South Korea	0–1	Tunisia	Seoul, South Korea
20:00 UTC+9		Report	Dhaouadi 44'	Stadium: Seoul World Cup Stadium; Attendance: 57,112; Referee: Martin Atkinson (England)

7 June Friendly	Belgium	1–0	Tunisia	Brussels, Belgium
20:45 UTC+2	Mertens 89'	Report		Stadium: King Baudouin Stadium; Attendance: 41,349; Referee: Viktor Kassai (Hungary)

6 September 2015 AFCON Q	Tunisia	2–1	Botswana	Monastir, Tunisia
20:15 UTC+1	Khazri 74'; Chikhaoui 89' (pen.)	Report	Mogorosi 44'	Stadium: Stade Mustapha Ben Jannet; Attendance: 20,000; Referee: Mohamed Hamada (Mauritania)

10 September 2015 AFCON Q	Egypt	0–1	Tunisia	Cairo, Egypt
21:00 UTC+3		Report	F. Ben Youssef 14'	Stadium: 30 June Stadium; Attendance: 15,000; Referee: Bakary Gassama (Gambia)

10 October 2015 AFCON Q	Senegal	0–0	Tunisia	Dakar, Senegal
20:00 UTC+0		Report		Stadium: Stade Léopold Sédar Senghor; Attendance: 50,000; Referee: Eric Otogo-Castane (Gabon)

15 October 2015 AFCON Q	Tunisia	1–0	Senegal	Monastir, Tunisia
20:15 UTC+1	Sassi 90+4'	Report		Stadium: Stade Mustapha Ben Jannet; Attendance: 20,000; Referee: Rajindraparsad Seechurn (Mauritius)

14 November 2015 AFCON Q	Botswana	0–0	Tunisia	Gaborone, Botswana
18:30 UTC+2		Report		Stadium: Botswana National Stadium; Attendance: 5,000; Referee: Juste Ephrem Zio (Burkina Faso)

19 November 2015 AFCON Q	Tunisia	2–1	Egypt	Monastir, Tunisia
20:00 UTC+1	Chikhaoui 52'; Khazri 80'	Report	Salah 14'	Stadium: Stade Mustapha Ben Jannet; Attendance: 18,000; Referee: Noumandiez Doué (Ivory Coast)

=== 2015 ===
11 January Friendly	Tunisia	1–1	Algeria	Tunis, Tunisia
18:00 UTC+1	Khazri 44'	Report	Cadamuro 39'	Stadium: Stade Olympique de Radès; Attendance: 50,000; Referee: Khalid Ennouni (Morocco)

18 January 2015 AFCON GS	Tunisia	1–1	Cape Verde	Ebibeyin, Equatorial Guinea
20:00 UTC+1	Manser 70'	Report	Héldon 78' (pen.)	Stadium: Estadio de Ebibeyin; Attendance: 7,479; Referee: Eric Otogo-Castane (Gabon)

22 January 2015 AFCON GS	Zambia	1–2	Tunisia	Ebibeyin, Equatorial Guinea
17:00 UTC+1	Mayuka 60'	Report	Akaïchi 70'; Chikhaoui 89'	Stadium: Estadio de Ebibeyin; Attendance: 8,000; Referee: Aboubacar Mario Bangoura (Guinea)

26 January 2015 AFCON GS	DR Congo	1–1	Tunisia	Bata, Equatorial Guinea
19:00 UTC+1	Bokila 66'	Report	Akaïchi 31'	Stadium: Estadio de Bata; Attendance: 11,463; Referee: Bakary Gassama (Gambia)

31 January 2015 AFCON QF	Tunisia	1–2 (a.e.t.)	Equatorial Guinea	Bata, Equatorial Guinea
20:30 UTC+1	Akaïchi 70'	Report	Balboa 90+3' (pen.), 102'	Stadium: Estadio de Bata; Attendance: 41,000; Referee: Rajindraparsad Seechurn (Mauritius)

27 March Friendly	Japan	2–0	Tunisia	Ōita, Japan
19:35 UTC+9	Okazaki 78'; Honda 83'	Report		Stadium: Showa Denko Dome Oita; Attendance: 34,777; Referee: Ben Williams (Australia)

31 March Friendly	China	1–1	Tunisia	Nanjing, China
19:35 UTC+8	Dabao 90+4'	Report	Moncer 39'	Stadium: Nanjing Olympic Sports Center; Attendance: 28,615; Referee: Kim Jong-hyeok (South Korea)

12 June 2017 AFCON Q	Tunisia	8–1	Djibouti	Tunis, Tunisia
20:30 UTC+1	Chikhaoui 9' (pen.), 22', 23'; Sassi 37'; Khalifa 62'; Ben Youssef 68'; Hannachi 80'; Touzghar 81'	Report	Liban 54' (pen.)	Stadium: Stade Olympique de Radès; Referee: Noureddine El Jaafari (Morocco)

5 September 2017 AFCON Q	Liberia	1–0	Tunisia	Monrovia, Liberia
16:00 UTC+0	Doe 79'	Report		Stadium: Antoinette Tubman Stadium; Referee: Maudo Jallow (Gambia)

9 October Friendly	Tunisia	3–3	Gabon	Tunis, Tunisia
19:00 UTC+1	Khenissi 4'; Camus 35'; Khazri 50'	Report	Aubameyang 33' (pen.); Lemina 63'; Kanga 86'	Stadium: Stade Olympique de Radès; Attendance: 5,000; Referee: Selim Jedidi (Tunisia)

13 November 2018 World Cup Q	Mauritania	1–2	Tunisia	Nouakchott, Mauritania
17:00 UTC+0	N'Diaye 22'	Report	Khazri 62'; Chikhaoui 68'	Stadium: Stade Olympique; Attendance: 9,000; Referee: Eric Otogo-Castane (Gabon)

17 November 2018 World Cup Q	Tunisia	2–1	Mauritania	Tunis, Tunisia
18:00 UTC+1	Ben Youssef 51'; Bguir 84'	Report (FIFA)	Cheikh Moulaye Ahmed 71'	Stadium: Stade Olympique de Radès; Attendance: 3,000; Referee: Denis Batte (Uganda)

=== 2016 ===
25 March 2017 AFCON Q	Tunisia	1–0	Togo	Monastir, Tunisia
18:00 UTC+1	Msakni 47'	Report		Stadium: Stade Mustapha Ben Jannet; Attendance: 5,000; Referee: Joshua Bondo (Botswana)

29 March 2017 AFCON Q	Togo	0–0	Tunisia	Lomé, Togo
15:00 UTC+1		Report		Stadium: Stade de Kégué; Attendance: 20,000; Referee: Bakary Gassama (Gambia)

3 June 2017 AFCON Q	Djibouti	0–3	Tunisia	Djibouti City, Djibouti
15:30 UTC+3		Report	Sliti 15'; Harbaoui 43'; Khenissi 58'	Stadium: Stade du Ville; Attendance: 1,000; Referee: Thierry Nkurunziza (Burundi)

4 September 2017 AFCON Q	Tunisia	4–1	Liberia	Monastir, Tunisia
18:30 UTC+1	Khazri 5'; Khenissi 35'; Khalifa 72'; Lahmar 77' (pen.)	Report	Paye 71'	Stadium: Stade Mustapha Ben Jannet; Attendance: 6,000; Referee: Daniel Bennett (South Africa)

9 October 2018 World Cup Q	Tunisia	2–0	Guinea	Monastir, Tunisia
18:00 UTC+1	Abdennour 58'; Ben-Hatira 79'	Report		Stadium: Stade Mustapha Ben Jannet; Attendance: 6,000; Referee: Thierry Nkurunziza (Burundi)

11 November 2018 World Cup Q	Libya	0–1	Tunisia	Algiers, Algeria
20:00 UTC+1		Report	Khazri 50' (pen.)	Stadium: Stade Omar Hamadi; Attendance: 6,000; Referee: Davies Omweno (Kenya)

15 November Friendly	Tunisia	0–0	Mauritania	Gabès, Tunisia
16:00 UTC+1		Report		Stadium: Stade Municipal de Gabès; Attendance: 5,000; Referee: Samir Guezzaz (Morocco)

=== 2017 ===
4 January Friendly	Tunisia	2–0	Uganda	Tunis, Tunisia
14:30 UTC+1	Lahmar 6'; Yacoubi 47'	Report		Stadium: Stade El Menzah; Attendance: 5,000; Referee: Babacar Sarr (Mauritania)

8 January Friendly	Egypt	1–0	Tunisia	Cairo, Egypt
17:00 UTC+2	Mohsen 90+1'	Report		Stadium: Cairo International Stadium; Attendance: 12,000; Referee: Yaqoub Yousef Al Hammadi (United Arab Emirates)

15 January 2017 AFCON GS	Tunisia	0–2	Senegal	Franceville, Gabon
20:00 UTC+1		Report	Mané 10' (pen.); Mbodji 30'	Stadium: Stade de Franceville; Attendance: 10,000; Referee: Sidi Alioum (Cameroon)

19 January 2017 AFCON GS	Algeria	1–2	Tunisia	Franceville, Gabon
17:00 UTC+1	Hanni 90+2'	Report	Mandi 50' (o.g.); Sliti 66' (pen.)	Stadium: Stade de Franceville; Attendance: 2,000; Referee: Bernard Camille (Seychelles)

23 January 2017 AFCON GS	Zimbabwe	2–4	Tunisia	Libreville, Gabon
20:00 UTC+1	Musona 42'; Ndoro 58'	Report	Sliti 9'; Msakni 22'; Khenissi 36'; Khazri 45' (pen.)	Stadium: Stade d'Angondjé; Attendance: 2,000; Referee: Denis Dembélé (Ivory Coast)

28 January 2017 AFCON QF	Burkina Faso	2–0	Tunisia	Libreville, Gabon
17:00 UTC+1	Bancé 81'; Nakoulma 85'	Report		Stadium: Stade d'Angondjé; Attendance: 10,000; Referee: Daniel Bennett (South Africa)

24 March Friendly	Tunisia	0–1	Cameroon	Monastir, Tunisia
19:00 UTC+1		Report	Aboubakar 14'	Stadium: Stade Mustapha Ben Jannet; Attendance: 6,000; Referee: Ali Lemghaifry (Mauritania)

28 March Friendly	Morocco	1–0	Tunisia	Marrakesh, Morocco
20:00 UTC+0	Younés 14' (o.g.)	Report		Stadium: Marrakesh Stadium; Attendance: 10,000; Referee: Issa Sy (Senegal)

11 June 2019 AFCON Q	Tunisia	1–0	Egypt	Tunis, Tunisia
23:00 UTC+1	Khenissi 47'	Report		Stadium: Stade Olympique de Radès; Attendance: 45,000; Referee: Bouchaïb El Ahrach (Morocco)

1 September 2018 World Cup Q	Tunisia	2–1	DR Congo	Tunis, Tunisia
21:00 UTC+1	Meriah 18' (pen.); Chaalali 47'	Report	Bakambu 43'	Stadium: Stade Olympique de Radès; Attendance: 30,000; Referee: Eric Otogo-Castane (Gabon)

5 September 2018 World Cup Q	DR Congo	2–2	Tunisia	Kinshasa, DR Congo
18:30 UTC+1	Mbemba 10'; M'Poku 47'	Report	Moke 77' (o.g.); Badri 78'	Stadium: Stade des Martyrs; Attendance: 80,000; Referee: Daniel Bennett (South Africa)

7 October 2018 World Cup Q	Guinea	1–4	Tunisia	Conakry, Guinea
17:00 UTC+0	N. Keïta 36'	Report	Msakni 45', 74', 90'; Ben Amor 83'	Stadium: Stade du 28 Septembre; Attendance: 12,000; Referee: Janny Sikazwe (Zambia)

11 November 2018 World Cup Q	Tunisia	0–0	Libya	Tunis, Tunisia
18:30 UTC+1		Report		Stadium: Stade Olympique de Radès; Attendance: 56,000; Referee: Hamada Nampiandraza (Madagascar)

=== 2018 ===
23 March Friendly	Tunisia	1–0	Iran	Tunis, Tunisia
19:15 UTC+1	Mohammadi 71' (o.g.)	Report		Stadium: Stade Olympique de Radès; Attendance: 5,000; Referee: Ibrahim Nour El Din (Egypt)

27 March Friendly	Tunisia	1–0	Costa Rica	Nice, France
20:00 UTC+1	Khazri 36'	Report		Stadium: Allianz Riviera; Attendance: 7,000; Referee: Frank Schneider (France)

28 May Friendly	Portugal	2–2	Tunisia	Braga, Portugal
19:45 UTC+1	A. Silva 22'; João Mário 34'		Badri 39'; Ben Youssef 64'	Stadium: Estádio Municipal de Braga; Attendance: 17,220; Referee: Luca Banti (Italy)

1 June Friendly	Tunisia	2–2	Turkey	Geneva, Switzerland
20:15 UTC+2	Badri 56'; Sassi 79'	Report	Tosun 54' (pen.); Söyüncü 90'	Stadium: Stade de Genève; Attendance: 12,000; Referee: Fedayi San (Switzerland)

9 June Friendly	Tunisia	0–1	Spain	Krasnodar, Russia
20:45 UTC+3		Report	Aspas 84'	Stadium: Krasnodar Stadium; Attendance: 33,116; Referee: Bas Nijhuis (Netherlands)

18 June 2018 World Cup GS	Tunisia	1–2	England	Volgograd, Russia
21:00 UTC+3	Sassi 35' (pen.)	Report	Kane 11', 90+1'	Stadium: Volgograd Arena; Attendance: 41,064; Referee: Wilmar Roldán (Colombia)

23 June 2018 World Cup GS	Belgium	5–2	Tunisia	Moscow, Russia
15:00 UTC+3	E. Hazard 6' (pen.), 51'; Lukaku 16', 45+3'; Batshuayi 90'	Report	Bronn 18'; Khazri 90+3'	Stadium: Otkritie Arena; Attendance: 44,190; Referee: Jair Marrufo (United States)

28 June 2018 World Cup GS	Panama	1–2	Tunisia	Saransk, Russia
21:00 UTC+3	Meriah 33' (o.g.)	Report	F. Ben Youssef 51'; Khazri 66'	Stadium: Mordovia Arena; Attendance: 37,168; Referee: Nawaf Shukralla (Bahrain)

9 September 2019 AFCON Q	Eswatini	0–2	Tunisia	Manzini, Eswatini
15:00 UTC+2		Report	Khenissi 18'; Sliti 37'	Stadium: Mavuso Sports Centre; Attendance: 500; Referee: Bamlak Tessema Weyesa (Ethiopia)

13 October 2019 AFCON Q	Tunisia	1–0	Niger	Tunis, Tunisia
19:15 UTC+1	Meriah 17'	Report		Stadium: Stade Olympique de Radès; Attendance: 20,000; Referee: Eric Otogo-Castane (Gabon)

16 October 2019 AFCON Q	Niger	1–2	Tunisia	Niamey, Niger
16:00 UTC+1	Oumarou 36'	Report	Chaouat 28', 32'	Stadium: Stade Général Seyni Kountché; Attendance: 5,000; Referee: Noureddine El Jaafari (Morocco)

16 November 2019 AFCON Q	Egypt	3–2	Tunisia	Alexandria, Egypt
18:00 UTC+2	Trézéguet 32'; B. El Mohamady 60'; Salah 90'	Report	Sliti 13', 72'	Stadium: Borg El Arab Stadium; Attendance: 25,000; Referee: Victor Gomes (South Africa)

20 November Friendly	Tunisia	0–1	Morocco	Tunis, Tunisia
18:00 UTC+1		Report	Nesyri 41'	Stadium: Stade Olympique de Radès; Attendance: 8,000; Referee: Ibrahim Nour El Din (Egypt)

=== 2019 ===
22 March 2019 AFCON Q	Tunisia	4–0	Eswatini	Tunis, Tunisia
19:15 UTC+1	Ben Youssef 21'; Badri 34'; Sliti 53'; Meriah 62'	Report		Stadium: Stade Olympique de Radès; Attendance: 5,000; Referee: Georges Gatogato (Burundi)

26 March Friendly	Algeria	1–0	Tunisia	Blida, Algeria
20:45 UTC+1	Bounedjah 70' (pen.)	Report		Stadium: Mustapha Tchaker Stadium; Attendance: 25,000; Referee: Samir Guezzaz (Morocco)

7 June Friendly	Tunisia	2–0	Iraq	Tunis, Tunisia
20:15 UTC+1	Khazri 4'; Srarfi 29'	Report		Stadium: Stade Olympique de Radès; Attendance: 20,000; Referee: Mohamed Maarouf (Egypt)

11 June Friendly	Croatia	1–2	Tunisia	Varaždin, Croatia
20:45 UTC+1	Petković 47'	Report	Badri 16'; Sliti 70' (pen.)	Stadium: Stadion Varteks; Attendance: 8,036; Referee: Daniel Stefański (Poland)

17 June Friendly	Tunisia	2–1	Burundi	Tunis, Tunisia
20:15 UTC+1	Khenissi 66'; Sliti 90+3'	Report	Amissi 76'	Stadium: Stade Olympique de Radès; Attendance: 45,000; Referee: Ahmed El Ghandour (Egypt)

24 June 2019 AFCON GS	Tunisia	1–1	Angola	Suez, Egypt
19:00 UTC+2	Msakni 34' (pen.)	Report	Djalma 73'	Stadium: Suez Stadium; Attendance: 7,345; Referee: Bamlak Tessema Weyesa (Ethiopia)

28 June 2019 AFCON GS	Tunisia	1–1	Mali	Suez, Egypt
16:30 UTC+2	Khazri 70'	Report	Samassékou 60'	Stadium: Suez Stadium; Attendance: 16,085; Referee: Joshua Bondo (Botswana)

2 July 2019 AFCON GS	Mauritania	0–0	Tunisia	Suez, Egypt
21:00 UTC+2		Report		Stadium: Suez Stadium; Attendance: 7,732; Referee: Louis Hakizimana (Rwanda)

8 July 2019 AFCON R16	Ghana	1–1 (a.e.t.) (4–5 p)	Tunisia	Ismailia, Egypt
21:00 UTC+2	Bedoui 90+2' (o.g.)	Report	Khenissi 73'	Stadium: Ismailia Stadium; Attendance: 8,890; Referee: Victor Gomes (South Africa)
	Penalties
	Wakaso (penalty scored); J. Ayew (penalty scored); Ekuban (penalty missed); Agbenyenu (penalty scored); Partey (penalty scored)		(penalty scored) Sliti; (penalty scored) Khazri; (penalty scored) Bronn; (penalty scored) Meriah; (penalty scored) Sassi

11 July 2019 AFCON QF	Madagascar	0–3	Tunisia	Cairo, Egypt
21:00 UTC+2		Report	Sassi 52'; Msakni 60'; Sliti 90+3'	Stadium: Al Salam Stadium; Attendance: 7,568; Referee: Sidi Alioum (Cameroon)

14 July 2019 AFCON SF	Senegal	1–0 (a.e.t.)	Tunisia	Cairo, Egypt
18:00 UTC+2	Bronn 101' (o.g.)	Report		Stadium: 30 June Stadium; Attendance: 9,143; Referee: Bamlak Tessema Weyesa (Ethiopia)

17 July 2019 AFCON 3rd	Tunisia	0–1	Nigeria	Cairo, Egypt
21:00 UTC+2		Report	Ighalo 3'	Stadium: Al Salam Stadium; Attendance: 6,340; Referee: Gehad Grisha (Egypt)

6 September Friendly	Tunisia	1–0	Mauritania	Tunis, Tunisia
20:15 UTC+1	Layouni 78'	Report		Stadium: Stade Olympique de Radès; Attendance: 30,000

10 September Friendly	Tunisia	1–2	Ivory Coast	Rouen, France
19:00 UTC+2	Sliti 89'	Report	Assalé 47'; Fofana 75'	Stadium: Stade Robert Diochon; Attendance: 3,000; Referee: Karim Abed (France)

12 October Friendly	Tunisia	0–0	Cameroon	Tunis, Tunisia
19:00 UTC+1		Report		Stadium: Stade Olympique de Radès; Attendance: 10,000; Referee: Nabil Boukhalfa (Algeria)

15 November 2021 AFCON Q	Tunisia	4–1	Libya	Tunis, Tunisia
20:00 UTC+1	Khazri 33', 90'; Khaoui 41', 52'	Report	Elhouni 45+1'	Stadium: Stade Olympique de Radès; Attendance: 20,000; Referee: Mahmoud El Banna (Egypt)

19 November 2021 AFCON Q	Equatorial Guinea	0–1	Tunisia	Malabo, Equatorial Guinea
20:00 UTC+1		Report	Khazri 74'	Stadium: Estadio de Malabo; Attendance: 10,000; Referee: Mohamed Athoumani (Comoros)
