= 2004 African Cup of Nations final =

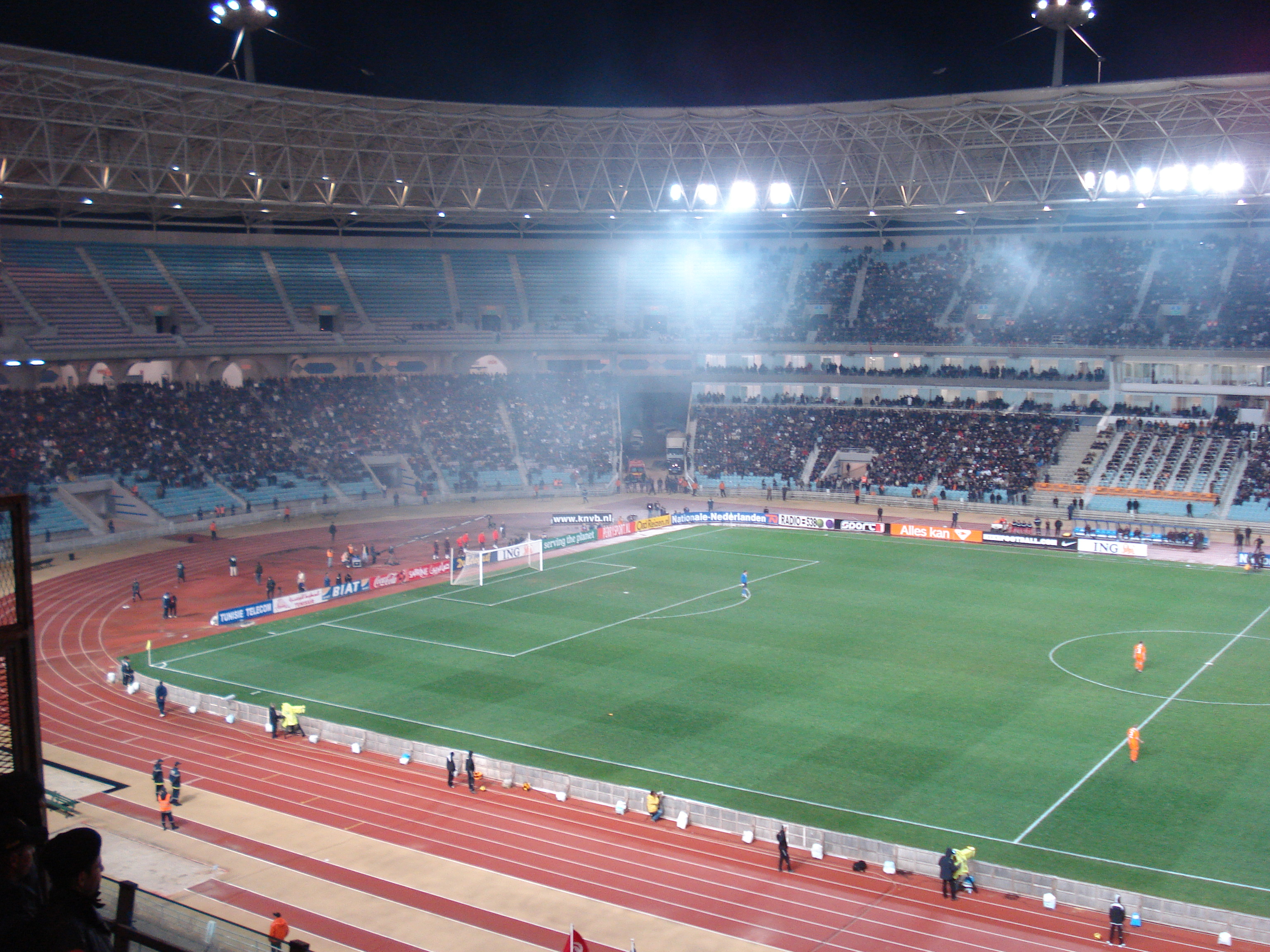
- 7 November Stadium hosted the match.
- Event: 2004 African Cup of Nations
Tunisia	Morocco
(Tunisia)	(Morocco)
2	1
- Date: 14 February 2004
- Venue: 7 November Stadium, Tunis
- Referee: Falla N'Doye (Senegal)
- Attendance: 60,000
- Weather: Clear; 19 °C (66 °F)

The 2004 African Cup of Nations final was a football match played on 14 February 2004 between Tunisia and Morocco. It determined the winner of the 2004 African Cup of Nations, the 24th edition of the biennial African tournament organized by the Confederation of African Football (CAF). The match was played at the 7 November Stadium in Tunis, Tunisia. Morocco qualified for the final for the first time in their history, while Tunisia reached the final for the third time.

Tunisia won the match in regulation time with a score of 2–1. With this victory, the team won its first Africa Cup of Nations title, while Morocco took second place. Tunisia took the lead in the 5th minute with a goal from Francileudo Santos, but Morocco turned things around with goals from Youssef Mokhtari in the 38nd minute before Tunisians take the lead again in the 52nd minute by Ziad Jaziri.

== Background ==
The African Cup of Nations, organised by the Confederation of African Football (CAF), is the primary international association football competition for African national teams. The 2004 tournament was the 24th edition since its inaugural event. This was the first time in the history both teams face each other in the final of the African Cup of Nations, having previously faced each other twi times in 1978 and 2000, both in group stage. Tunisia has not won the title until 2004, having lost the final twice in 1965 on home soil and 1996 in South Africa. While, Morocco, won the title once, in 1976 in Ethiopia.

== Venue ==
The 7 November Stadium is a multi-purpose stadium in Radès about 10 kilometers south-east of the city center of Tunis, Tunisia, in the center of the Olympic City. It is currently used mostly for football matches and it also has facilities for athletics. The stadium holds 60,000 and was built in 2001 for the 2001 Mediterranean Games and is considered to be one of the best stadiums in Africa. The stadium was built for the 2001 Mediterranean Games, the 60,000-seat covered area covers 13,000 m2 and consists of a central area, 3 adjoining grounds, 2 warm-up rooms, 2 paintings and an official stand of 7,000 seats. The press gallery is equipped with 300 desks.

== Road to the final ==
Tunisia
Round
Morocco
Opponents
Result
Group stage
Opponents
Result
Rwanda
2–1
Match 1
Nigeria
1–0
DR Congo
3–0
Match 2
Benin
4–0
Guinea
1–1
Match 3
South Africa
1–1
Group A winners

Pos	Team	Pld	Pts
1	Tunisia (H)	3	7
2	Guinea	3	5
3	Rwanda	3	4
4	DR Congo	3	0

Source: Soccerway
(H) Hosts
Final standings
Group D winners

Pos	Team	Pld	Pts
1	Morocco	3	7
2	Nigeria	3	6
3	South Africa	3	4
4	Benin	3	0

Source: Soccerway
Opponents
Result
Knockout stage
Opponents
Result
Senegal
1–0
Quarter-finals
Algeria
3–1 (a.e.t)
Nigeria
1–1 (a.e.t.) (5–3 pen.)
Semi-finals
Mali
4–0

=== Tunisia ===
Tunisia entered the tournament for the 11th time as hosts and one of the favorites to win the title, boasting a respectable generation of players. Tunisia has never won the Africa Cup of Nations, having reached the final twice before: in 1965 on home soil, losing to Ghana 2–3 after extra time, and again in 1996, losing to hosts South Africa 0–2.

In the opening match of the Group A at the 7 November Stadium, Tunisia defeated Rwanda, who were making their debut in a major tournament. Ziad Jaziri scored the first goal in the 27th minute. Rwanda equalized from a direct free kick by João Elias Manamana in the 31st minute before Francileudo Santos doubled the lead for the home side in the 57th minute. The match ended with Tunisia winning 2–1. In the second match against DR Congo, the game was somewhat difficult until Lomana LuaLua received a red card in the first half after a reckless challenge on Jawhar Mnari. Santos scored the first goal in the 55th minute, Najeh Braham doubled the score in the 65th minute, and Santos added a third in the 87th minute to end the match with a 3–0 victory. In the third match against Guinea, where coach Roger Lemerre rested key players, Tunisia took the lead with a goal from Selim Benachour in the 85th minute, while Guinea equalized with a goal from Titi Camara in the final minutes of the match. The match ended in a 1–1 draw. Tunisia topped Group A with seven points from two wins and a draw and advanced to the quarter-finals.

In the quarter-final, against Senegal, the runner-up of the previous edition and the most prominent candidate to win the cup, the match was balanced between the two teams until Tunisia took the lead with a header from Mnari via a scissor pass from Jaziri in the 65th minute, ending the match with a 1–0 victory and the team advancing to the semi-final. In the semi-final, Tunisia faced their toughest match of the tournament against a formidable Nigeria side. The Super Eagles took the lead with a penalty converted by Jay-Jay Okocha in the 67th minute, marking the first time Tunisia had fallen behind. The Eagles of Carthage leveled the score with a penalty converted by Khaled Badra in the 87th minute. The match went to penalties after a 1–1 draw, which Tunisia won 5–3. Ali Boumnijel saved Peter Odemwingie's penalty, and the Tunisians converted all five of their spot-kicks, securing their place in the final for the third time in their history.

=== Morocco ===
Morocco is entering the tournament for the 12th time. They previously won the title in 1976 in Ethiopia after topping their group in the final round and drawing their final match against Guinea 1–1. Morocco has never played in a final match.

In Group D, at the Mustapha Ben Jannet Stadium in Monastir, Morocco secured a 1–0 victory against a strong Nigerian side, with Youssef Hadji scoring the winning goal in the 77th minute. In their second match against Benin at the Taieb Mhiri Stadium in Sfax, who were making their debut in a major tournament, Morocco achieved their second victory. Marouane Chamakh opened the scoring in the 17th minute, and the lead doubled in the 73rd minute with an own goal by Benin's Anicet Adjamossi. Two minutes later, Abdeslam Ouaddou added a third, and Talal El Karkouri completed the scoring in the 80th minute. The match concluded with a resounding 4–0 victory. In the third match gainst South Africa at the Sousse Olympic Stadium in Sousse. Bafana Bafana had initially taken the lead after half an hour through Patrick Mayo, but Morocco equalized eight minutes later with a penalty converted by Youssef Safri, ending the match 1–1. Morocco topped Group D with seven points from two wins and a draw and advanced to the quarter-finals.

In the quarter-finals, against rival and neighbor Algeria, in a fiery derby match at the Tayeb Mhiri Stadium in Sfax, in front of 22,000 spectators, the match was tight and somewhat difficult until the Algerians took the lead in the 84th minute through Abdelmalek Cherrad. However, Chamakh equalized in the fourth minute of stoppage time, ending regulation time in a draw and sending the match into extra time. Hadji scored the opening goal in the 113th minute, and Jawad Zairi delivered the final blow with the third goal in the 120+1 minute, ending the match with a 3–1 victory for the Atlas Lions in a thrilling encounter. In the semi-final in Sousse, the match against Mali was relatively easy, with Youssef Mokhtari opening the scoring after a quarter of an hour and then doubling the lead in the 58th minute. Hadji scored the third goal in the 80th minute, and Nabil Baha sealed the victory with a fourth goal in the 90+1 minute, sending Morocco to the final for the first time in their history after a respectable run in the tournament. They will face hosts Tunisia in the final.

== Pre-match ==
On 13 February 2004, Senegalese referee Falla N'Doye was appointed to officiate the final match, assisted by Ali Tomusange of Uganda and Brighton Mudzamiri of Zimbabwe, with Benin's Coffi Codjia serving as the fourth official. N'Doye became an international referee in 1995 and officiated one match at the 2002 FIFA World Cup. Earlier in the tournament, he refereed the Group A match between Rwanda and the DR Congo, and the Group D match between Nigeria and Morocco. This was the second time a Senegalese referee had officiated an Africa Cup of Nations final, following his compatriot Badara Sène, who refereed the 1992 final between Ivory Coast and Ghana. Several important figures attended the match, including President Zine El Abidine Ben Ali and his wife Leïla Ben Ali, FIFA President Sepp Blatter, CAF President Issa Hayatou, and AFC President Mohamed Bin Hammam.

== Match ==
=== Summary ===
The final, held on 14 February 2004 at 7 November Stadium, Tunis in front of 60,000 supporters, saw Tunisia got off to a good start with a lead 1–0 after four minutes when Mehdi Nafti centered on Dos Santos, who scored his fourth goal of the tournament. At the end of the first half, Morocco came back to score with a goal from Youssouf Hadji on a lift from Youssef Mokhtari. Seven minutes passed in the second half before another Tunisian striker, Jaziri gave his country the lead. The match finally ends with the score of 2–1, giving Tunisia their first Africa Cup of Nations title.

=== Details ===
14 February 2004
14:30

Tunisia	2–1	Morocco
Santos 5'; Jaziri 52'	Report	Mokhtari 38'

7 November Stadium, Tunis
Attendance: 60,000
Referee: Falla N'Doye (Senegal)

Tunisia	Morocco

GK	1	Ali Boumnijel
RB	13	Riadh Bouazizi (c)
CB	3	Karim Haggui
CB	15	Radhi Jaïdi
LB	8	Mehdi Nafti		(substituted off) 46'
CM	6	Hatem Trabelsi
CM	14	Adel Chedli
CM	20	José Clayton
AM	18	Selim Benachour		(substituted off) 57'
CF	11	Francileudo Santos
CF	5	Ziad Jaziri	(yellow card) 60'	(substituted off) 70'
Substitutions:
MF	12	Jawhar Mnari		(substituted on) 46'
MF	10	Kaies Ghodhbane		(substituted on) 57'
FW	7	Imed Mhedhebi		(substituted on) 70'
Manager:
(France) Roger Lemerre

GK	1	Khalid Fouhami
CB	5	Talal El Karkouri
CB	6	Noureddine Naybet (c)	(yellow card) 77'
CB	4	Abdeslam Ouaddou
RM	2	Walid Regragui	(yellow card) 90'
CM	15	Youssef Safri		(substituted off) 63'
CM	8	Abdelkarim Kissi
LM	3	Akram Roumani	(yellow card) 22'	(substituted off) 70'
AM	16	Youssef Mokhtari
CF	20	Youssef Hadji		(substituted off) 86'
CF	17	Marouane Chamakh
Substitutions:
MF	11	Moha El Yaagoubi		(substituted on) 63'
FW	7	Jaouad Zaïri		(substituted on) 70'
FW	9	Nabil Baha		(substituted on) 86'
Manager:
Ezzaki Badou

Assistant referees:
Ali Tomusange (Uganda)
Brighton Mudzamiri (Zimbabwe)
Fourth official:
Coffi Codjia (Benin)

Match rules

- 90 minutes.
- 30 minutes of extra time if necessary.
- Penalty shoot-out if scores still level.

== Post-match ==
As soon as referee Falla N'Doye blew the final whistle, scenes of jubilation erupted in the stadium and throughout the country. The Tunisian players performed a circuit of the pitch, then climbed onto the podium to receive their gold medals, while the Moroccan players received their silver medals. Later, President Ben Ali presented the trophy to Khaled Badra and Riadh Bouazizi, who then raised it high. The Eagles of Carthage became the 13th national team in history to be crowned African champions. Roger Lemerre also becomes the first coach to win two different continental tournaments after having previously won Euro 2000 with France.

On 24 February, Ben Ali received the Tunisian team at the Carthage Palace, accompanied by members of the technical and administrative staff, and awarded them the National Order of Merit. Tunisia also won the African National Team of the Year award from the Confederation of African Football.

The two teams faced each other again in Group 5 during the second round of the 2006 FIFA World Cup qualification. The first leg played on 4 September 2004 in Rabat ended in a 1–1 draw, and the second leg played on 8 October 2005 in Tunis also ended in a 2–2 draw. Tunisia secured its fourth World Cup qualification by finishing top of the group, while Morocco failed to qualify, finishing one point behind Tunisia.
