= 2006 LG Cup (Tunisia) =

كأس إل جي 2006

Tournament details
- Host country: Tunisia
- City: Tunis
- Dates: 30 May – 2 June
- Teams: 4 (from 3 confederations)
- Venue: 1 (in 1 host city)

Final positions
- Champions: Uruguay (2nd title)
- Runners-up: Tunisia
- Third place: Libya
- Fourth place: Belarus

Tournament statistics
- Matches played: 4
- Goals scored: 8 (2 per match)
- Attendance: 62,000 (15,500 per match)
- Top scorer: 8 players (1 goal each)

The 2006 LG Cup was the 18th edition of the international friendly football tournament, the LG Cup. It was organized by the Tunisian Football Federation (TFF) and was held between 30 May and 2 June in Tunis, Tunisia.

This is the second time Tunisia has hosted the competition, after the inaugural edition in 1997. Four teams participated in the tournament: Belarus, Libya, Tunisia and Uruguay. Uruguay won the tournament for their second LG Cuo title, defeating Tunisia 3–1 in a penalty shoot-out after the final finished goalless following extra time.

== Participants ==
The participants were:

- Belarus
- Libya
- Tunisia
- Uruguay

== Venue ==
All four matches was played at the 7 November Stadium in Tunis.

Tunis	2006 LG Cup (Tunisia) is located in Tunisia
7 November Stadium	2006 LG Cup (Tunisia) is located in Tunisia
Capacity: 60,000	2006 LG Cup (Tunisia) is located in Tunisia

== Results ==
=== Bracket ===
Semi-finals
30 May – Tunis
Tunisia	3
Belarus	0
30 May – Tunis
Libya	1
Uruguay	2

Final
2 June – Tunis
Tunisia	1 (1)
Uruguay (pen.)	1 (3)
Third place
2 June – Tunis
Libya (pen.)	0 (3)
Belarus	0 (1)

=== Semi-finals ===
30 May 2006
18:00

Uruguay	2–1	Libya
Vigneri 15'; Abreu 34'	Report	El Taib 61'

7 November Stadium, Tunis
Attendance: 5,000
Referee: Atef Yacoubi (Tunisia)

30 May 2006
20:30

Tunisia	3–0	Belarus
Namouchi 35' (pen.); Santos 47'; Jomaa 90+2'	Report

7 November Stadium, Tunis
Attendance: 24,000
Referee: Djaballah Touati (Algeria)

=== Third place match ===
2 June 2006
17:00

Libya	1–1	Belarus
Osman 90+3'	Report	Shtanyuk 12'
Penalties
	3–1

7 November Stadium, Tunis
Attendance: 8,000
Referee: Aouaz Trabelsi (Tunisia)

=== Final ===
2 June 2006
19:30

Tunisia	0–0	Uruguay
	Report
Penalties
Mnari (penalty missed); Ghodhbane (penalty scored); Bouazizi (penalty missed); Meriah (penalty missed)	1–3	(penalty scored) Scotti; (penalty missed) Olivera; (penalty scored) Estoyanoff; (penalty scored) Giacomazzi

7 November Stadium, Tunis
Attendance: 25,000
Referee: Nasser Abbas (Egypt)

== Statistics ==
=== Goalscorers ===
There were 8 goals scored in 4 matches, for an average of 2 goals per match.

1 goal

- (Tunisia) Hamed Namouchi
- (Tunisia) Francileudo Santos
- (Tunisia) Issam Jemâa
- (Libya) Tarik El Taib
- (Libya) Walid Ali Osman
- (Uruguay) Nicolás Vigneri
- (Uruguay) Sebastian Abreu
- (Belarus) Syarhey Shtanyuk

=== Tournament team rankings ===
As per statistical convention in football, matches decided in extra time are counted as wins and losses, while matches decided by penalty shoot-outs are counted as draws.

Pos	Team	Pld	W	D	L	GF	GA	GD	Pts	Final result
1	Uruguay	2	1	1	0	2	0	+2	4	Champions
2	Tunisia (H)	2	1	1	0	3	0	+3	4	Runner-up
3	Libya	2	0	1	1	2	2	0	1	Third place
4	Belarus	2	0	1	1	1	4	−3	1	

Source: RSSSF
(H) Hosts
