= Bembla-Mnara =

- Municipality
- Interactive map of Bembla-Mnara
- Country: Tunisia
- Governorate: Monastir Governorate

Population (2014)
  - Total: 16,078
- Time zone: UTC+1 (CET)

Bembla-Mnara is a municipality in Monastir Governorate, Tunisia. It consists of the town of Bembla and the village Mnara. Bembla is the seat of an eponymous governoral delegation.
