= 2003 Tunis Four Nations Tournament =

2003 Four Nations Tournament
دورة تونس للأمم الأربعة 2003
- Official tournament poster.

Tournament details
- Host country: Tunisia
- City: Tunis
- Dates: 27–30 March
- Teams: 4 (from 1 confederation)
- Venue: 1 (in 1 host city)

Final positions
- Champions: Tunisia
- Runners-up: Cameroon
- Third place: Ghana
- Fourth place: Madagascar

Tournament statistics
- Matches played: 4
- Goals scored: 13 (3.25 per match)
- Top scorer(s): (Ghana) Charles Amoah (3 goals)

The 2003 Tunis Four Nations Tournament was an international friendly football tournament. It was organized by the Tunisian Football Federation (FTF) and was held between 27 and 30 March in Tunis, Tunisia. Four teams participated in the tournament: Cameroon, Ghana, Madagascar and Tunisia. Tunisia won the tournament after defeating Cameroon 1–0 in the final. This tournament served as preparation for Tunisia's hosting of the 2004 African Cup of Nations.

== Participants ==
The participants were:

- Cameroon
- Ghana
- Madagascar
- Tunisia

== Venue ==
Tunis	2003 Tunis Four Nations Tournament is located in Tunisia
7 November Stadium	2003 Tunis Four Nations Tournament is located in Tunisia
Capacity: 60,000	2003 Tunis Four Nations Tournament is located in Tunisia

== Results ==
=== Bracket ===
Semi-finals
27 March – Tunis
Tunisia (p)	2 (8)
Ghana	2 (7)
27 March – Tunis
Cameroon	2
Madagascar	0

Final
30 March – Tunis
Tunisia	1
Cameroon	0
Third place
30 March – Tunis
Ghana (p)	3 (10)
Madagascar	3 (9)

=== Semi-finals ===
27 March 2003

Tunisia	2–2	Ghana
Mhedhebi 47'; Missaoui 55'	Report	Amoah 45', 49'
Penalties
	8–7

7 November Stadium, Tunis
Attendance: 30,000

27 March 2003

Cameroon	2–0	Madagascar
Eto'o 16'; Job 44'	Report

7 November Stadium, Tunis
Attendance: 25,000

=== Third place match ===
30 March 2003

Ghana	3–3	Madagascar
Appiah 5'; Amoah 32'; Gyan 60'	Report	Essien 47' (o.g.); Rasonaivo 82'; Randriandelison 88'
Penalties
	10–9

7 November Stadium, Tunis

=== Final ===
30 March 2003

Tunisia	1–0	Cameroon
Bouazizi 82'	Report

7 November Stadium, Tunis
Referee: Mohamed Guezzaz (Morocco)

== Goalscorers ==
There were 13 goals scored in 4 matches, for an average of 3.25 goals per match.

3 goals

- (Ghana) Charles Amoah

1 goal

- (Cameroon) Samuel Eto'o
- (Cameroon) Joseph-Désiré Job
- (Ghana) Stephen Appiah
- (Ghana) Baffour Gyan
- (Madagascar) Hervé Rado Rasonaivo
- (Madagascar) Norbert Randriandelison
- (Tunisia) Riadh Bouazizi
- (Tunisia) Imed Mhedhebi
- (Tunisia) Nabil Missaoui

1 own goal

- (Ghana) Michael Essien (against Madagascar)

== See also ==
- 2004 African Cup of Nations
