= Ziad Jaziri =

Tunisian footballer (born 1978)

Personal information
- Full name: Ziad Jaziri
- Date of birth: 12 July 1978 (age 48)
- Place of birth: Sousse, Tunisia
- Height: 1.71 m (5 ft 7 in)
- Position: Striker

Senior career*
Years	Team	Apps	(Gls)
1999–2002	Étoile du Sahel		
2003–2005	Gaziantepspor	49	(17)
2005–2007	Troyes	44	(6)
2007–2008	Al-Kuwait	15	(9)

International career
1999–2007	Tunisia	64	(14)
Medal record
Men's football
Representing Tunisia
Africa Cup of Nations
Winner	2004 Tunisia
- * Club domestic league appearances and goals

Ziad Jaziri (Arabic: زياد الجزيري; born 12 July 1978) is a Tunisian former professional footballer who played as a striker. He is currently the sporting director of the Tunisian national team.

== Club career ==
Jaziri began his career at his hometown club, Étoile du Sahel, where he succeeded. He moved to Europe with Turkish club Gaziantepspor in the Süper Lig, then to France with Troyes in Ligue 1, before finishing his career at Kuwait SC.

== International career ==
He has 64 caps and 14 goals for the Tunisia national team, and was called up to the 2002 FIFA World Cup, where he played a key role in the qualification. He was also selected for the 2006 FIFA World Cup in Germany, where he scored the first goal for Tunisia in the first match against Saudi Arabia on 14 June 2006.

Jaziri was particularly decisive during the 2004 Africa Cup of Nations won by the Tunisian national team, notably by scoring the winning goal in the final against Morocco.

== Post-retirement ==
He held several responsibilities within his hometown club. In 2011, he became head of recruitment for Étoile du Sahel. In August 2012, he held the position of the head of the senior football team and technical advisor within the club. Later, he was appointed by Ridha Charfeddine as the team's sporting director, successfully recruiting players who contributed to achieving domestic and continental honours. He is currently the sporting director of the Tunisian national team.

== Personal life ==
Jaziri is married to the niece of former Tunisian President Zine El Abidine Ben Ali.

On 14 July 2011, he was arrested with former Tunisian international Hatem Trabelsi and Club Africain player Oussama Sellami for questioning in a drug possession, consumption and trafficking affair.

He was sentenced to one year in prison. The national team players had worn jerseys bearing the message "In Solidarity with Ziad Jaziri" a few days earlier, at the end of a match during the 2012 Africa Cup of Nations. On 12 July 2012, he was released after serving his sentence.

== Career statistics ==
Scores and results list Tunisia's goal tally first.

#	Date	Venue	Opponent	Score	Result	Competition
1.	22 April 2000	Stade El Menzah, Tunis, Tunisia	Mauritania	2–0	3–0	2002 FIFA World Cup qualification
2.	7 October 2000	Stade El Menzah, Tunis, Tunisia	Gabon	1–0	4–2	2002 Africa Cup of Nations qualification
3.	28 January 2001	Stade Municipal, Pointe-Noire, Congo	Congo	2–1	2–1	2002 FIFA World Cup qualification
4.	25 February 2001	Stade El Menzah, Tunis, Tunisia	DR Congo	2–0	6–0	2002 FIFA World Cup qualification
5.	25 February 2001	Stade El Menzah, Tunis, Tunisia	DR Congo	4–0	6–0	2002 FIFA World Cup qualification
6.	20 May 2001	Stade El Menzah, Tunis, Tunisia	Ivory Coast	1–1	1–1	2002 FIFA World Cup qualification
7.	17 June 2001	Stade El Menzah, Tunis, Tunisia	Kenya	2–0	4–1	2002 Africa Cup of Nations qualification
8.	17 June 2001	Stade El Menzah, Tunis, Tunisia	Kenya	3–0	4–1	2002 Africa Cup of Nations qualification
9.	26 May 2002	Kimiidera Athletic Stadium, Wakayama, Japan	Denmark	1–1	1–2	Friendly
10.	14 January 2004	Stade Houmt Souk, Djerba, Tunisia	Benin	1–0	2–0	Friendly
11.	24 January 2004	Stade 7 November, Radès, Tunisia	Rwanda	1–0	2–1	2004 African Cup of Nations
12.	14 February 2004	Stade 7 November, Radès, Tunisia	Morocco	2–1	2–1	2004 African Cup of Nations
13.	9 October 2004	Chichiri Stadium, Blantyre, Malawi	Malawi	1–2	2–2	2006 FIFA World Cup qualification
14.	14 June 2006	FIFA WM Stadion München, Munich, Germany	Saudi Arabia	1–0	2–2	2006 FIFA World Cup

== Honours ==
Étoile du Sahel

- CAF Cup: 1999

Kuwait SC

- Kuwait Premier League: 2007–08
- Kuwait Crown Prince Cup: 2008

Tunisia

- Africa Cup of Nations: 2004
