= Najeh Braham =

Tunisian footballer and manager

Personal information
- Date of birth: 20 May 1977 (age 49)
- Place of birth: Bembla, Tunisia
- Height: 1.86 m (6 ft 1 in)
- Position: Forward

Senior career*
Years	Team	Apps	(Gls)
- US Monastir
–2001	1. SC Göttingen 05		
2001–2004	Eintracht Trier	50	(15)
2004–2005	Rot-Weiß Erfurt	12	(1)
2005–2006	Eintracht Trier	24	(12)
2006–2008	Sportfreunde Siegen	1	(0)
2008–2009	1. FC Magdeburg	44	(18)
2009–2011	Erzgebirge Aue	30	(11)

International career
2003–2006	Tunisia	14	(4)

Managerial career
- 2014: I. SC Göttingen 05
Medal record
Men's football
Representing Tunisia
Africa Cup of Nations
Winner	2004 Tunisia
- * Club domestic league appearances and goals

Najeh Braham (born 20 May 1977) is a Tunisian retired footballer and current manager.

== Club career ==
Born in Bembla, Tunisia, Braham began his playing career with Tunisian side US Monastir. His first club in Germany was 1. SC Göttingen 05. In 2001, Braham moved to Regionalliga Süd side Eintracht Trier, but only played in six matches in his first season. After Trier's promotion to 2. Bundesliga, the club looked to off-load him, but no interest was shown. In the next season, Braham had his breakthrough with Trier, scoring 13 goals in 29 matches and securing a mid-table finish for the club. However, in the following season, Braham hit a dry spell, not scoring once in all his 15 matches, leading to his transfer to newly promoted Rot-Weiß Erfurt in 2004. But at Erfurt, Braham's problems continued, he only played in 12 matches, scoring once. Eventually the rest of the team declared itself displeased by Braham's egoistical way of playing, and he moved back to Eintracht Trier. Trier had been relegated to Regionalliga Süd, and Braham's 12 goals in 24 matches could not prevent the club from being relegated to the tier IV Oberliga Südwest.

From the 2006–07 season onwards, Braham played for Regionalliga Süd side Sportfreunde Siegen, but played for the reserves in the tier V Verbandsliga most of the time. In the winter break of the 2007–08 season his contract was terminated, and on 22 January 2008 he signed for 1. FC Magdeburg. Despite the club missing out on qualification for the newly created 3. Liga, Braham extended his contract until 2011, but left the club on 13 July 2009 to sign with Erzgebirge Aue, after Magdeburg had told the player that he no longer played a role in their plans.

== International career ==
Braham has had 14 caps for Tunisia, he was part of the Tunisia squad that won the 2004 edition of the African Cup of Nations, playing in two matches and scoring once.

== Coaching career ==
In February 2014, Braham took over as manager at Göttingen 05. He was released by the club in October 2014.

== Honours ==
Tunisia

- Africa Cup of Nations: 2004
