= Bembla =

Bembla بنبلة
- Town
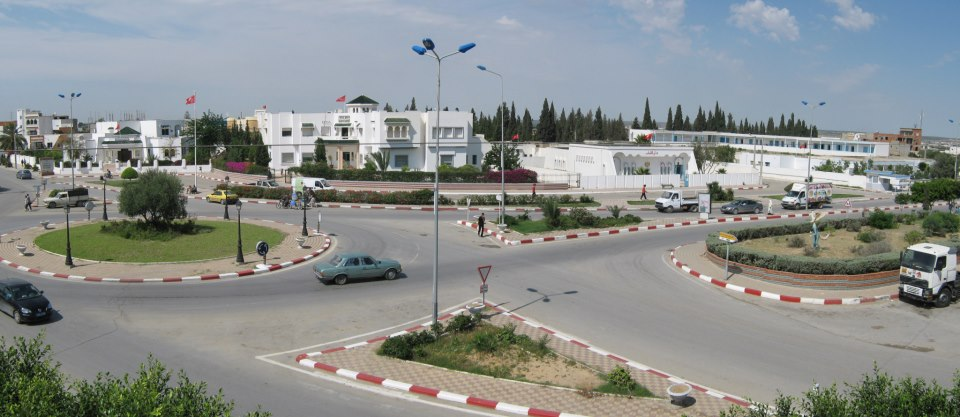
- Bembla
- Interactive map of Bembla
- Coordinates: 35°42′N 10°48′E
- Country: Tunisia
- Governorate: Monastir Governorate
- Municipality: Bembla-Mnara

Area
  - Total: 18.9 sq mi (48.9 km^{2})
  - Land: 18.9 sq mi (48.9 km^{2})
- Elevation: 66 ft (20 m)

Population (2021)
  - Total: 18,018
- Time zone: UTC+1 (CET)

Bembla is a town in the Monastir Governorate, Tunisia. Governed by the joint municipality of Bembla-Mnara, it is also the seat of an eponymous governoral delegation.
