= Khaled Badra =

Tunisian footballer (born 1973)

Personal information
- Date of birth: 8 April 1973 (age 53)
- Place of birth: Kairouan, Tunisia
- Height: 1.87 m (6 ft 2 in)
- Position: Defender

Senior career*
Years	Team	Apps	(Gls)
1994–1995	JS Kairouan	0	(0)
1995–2000	Espérance de Tunis	84	(3)
2000–2001	Denizlispor	26	(1)
2001–2002	Genoa	16	(0)
2002–2003	Al-Ahli	18	(2)
2003–2006	Espérance de Tunis	40	(6)
2006–2007	Al-Ahli	8	(0)
Total		184	(12)

International career
1995–2006	Tunisia	96	(10)
Medal record
Men's football
Representing Tunisia
Africa Cup of Nations
Winner	2004 Tunisia
Runner-up	1996 South Africa
- * Club domestic league appearances and goals

Khaled Badra (Arabic: خَالِد بَدْرَة; born 8 April 1973) is a Tunisian former professional footballer who played as a defender.

== Club career ==
Badra was born in Kairouan. After beginnings with his hometown's squad, Jeunesse Sportive Kairouanaise, he joined Espérance de Tunis in 1996. He made a name for himself in the country as a powerful and uncompromising centre-back, who could also score from set pieces. He earned a call up to the Tunisia national team for the 1996 Olympics in Atlanta at the age of 23 and became a virtual ever-present after that. His good form for the national side was mirrored in Tunisian competitions, where he has led Espérance to continuous league triumphs.

His club football career has been varied – solid and loyal service interspersed by short spells abroad. He also played for Genoa C.F.C. in Seria B, Al-Ahli Jeddah in Saudi Premier League, and Denizlispor in the Turkish league. He plans to see out his career at Espérance.

== International career ==
Badra featured for the Tunisia national team in both 1998 World Cup and 2002 World Cup, as well as the three African Nations Cups in that time. His finest hour came in the 2004 African Nations Cup when Tunisia hosted the games. He scored two penalties in the semi-final against Nigeria (one in normal time and another in the shootout), but also picked up a yellow card meaning he was suspended for the final. He decided to retire from international football in 2006.

=== International goals ===
Scores and results list Tunisia's goal tally first, score column indicates score after each Badra goal.

List of international goals scored by Khaled Badra
No.	Date	Venue	Opponent	Score	Result	Competition
1	6 April 1997	Independence Stadium, Windhoek	Namibia	2–0	2–1	1998 FIFA World Cup qualification
2	27 April 1997	Stade El Menzah, Tunis	Liberia	2–0	2–0	1998 FIFA World Cup qualification
3	27 May 1998	Ernst Happel Stadion, Wien	Austria	1–2	1–2	Friendly
4	6 June 1998	Stade El Menzah, Tunis	Wales	2–0	4–0	Friendly
5	6 June 1998	Stade El Menzah, Tunis	Wales	3–0	4–0	Friendly
6	7 November 1998	Stade Olympique de Radès, Tunis	Zimbabwe	1–1	1–1	Friendly
7	7 February 2000	Sani Abacha Stadium, Kano	Egypt	1–0	1–0	2000 African Cup of Nations
8	1 July 2001	Stade El Menzah, Tunis	Congo	1–0	6–0	2002 FIFA World Cup qualification
9	15 July 2001	Stade des Martyrs, Kinshasa	DR Congo	1–0	3–0	2002 FIFA World Cup qualification
10	11 February 2004	Stade Olympique de Radès, Tunis	Nigeria	1–1	1–1 (5–3 p)	2004 African Cup of Nations

== Honours ==
Espérance Sportive de Tunis

Tunisian League: 1998, 1999, 2000, 2003, 2004, 2006
Tunisian President Cup: 1997, 1999
African Cup Winners' Cup: 1998
CAF Cup: 1997
African Cup Winners' Cup: 1998

Al-Ahli (Jeddah)

Crown Prince Cup: 2002, 2007
Arab Champions League: 2003
Saudi Federation cup: 2007

Tunisia

- Africa Cup of Nations: 2004
