= Walid Ali Osman =

Libyan footballer (born 1977)

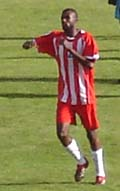

Personal information
- Date of birth: February 28, 1977 (age 49)
- Place of birth: Sabratha, Libya
- Height: 1.83 m (6 ft 0 in)
- Position: Defender

Team information
- Current team: Al-Ittihad
- Number: 2

Senior career*
Years	Team	Apps	(Gls)
2003–04	Wefaq Sabratha	?	(?)
2004–05	Al Orouba	?	(?)
2005–present	Al-Ittihad	?	(?)

International career
	Libya	27	(0)
- * Club domestic league appearances and goals as of January 27, 2007

Walid Ali Osman (Arabic: وليد عصمان) (born 28 February 1977) is a Libyan football defender currently playing for Al-Ittihad. He is a member of the Libya national football team.
