= Riadh Bouazizi =

Tunisian footballer

Personal information
- Full name: Riadh Ben-Khemais Bouazizi
- Date of birth: 8 April 1973 (age 53)
- Place of birth: Bizerte, Tunisia
- Height: 1.86 m (6 ft 1 in)
- Position: Central midfielder

Senior career*
Years	Team	Apps	(Gls)
1991–2000	Étoile du Sahel	205	(10)
2000–2002	Bursaspor	46	(2)
2002–2005	Gaziantepspor	90	(8)
2005–2007	Kayseri Erciyesspor	35	(1)
2007–2008	CA Bizertin	44	(1)
Total		420	(22)

International career
1996–2007	Tunisia	92	(4)
Medal record
Men's football
Representing Tunisia
Africa Cup of Nations
Winner	2004 Tunisia
Runner-up	1996 South Africa
- * Club domestic league appearances and goals

Riadh Ben-Khemais Bouazizi (Arabic: رِيَاض بْن خَمِيس الْبُوعَزِيزِيّ; born 8 April 1973) is a Tunisian former professional footballer who played as a central midfielder.

Bouazizi started his career with Étoile du Sahel where he amassed over 200 league appearances. He played for Turkish clubs Bursaspor, Gaziantepspor and Kayseri Erciyesspor in the Süper Lig before finishing ending his career with CA Bizertin.

He has 83 caps for the Tunisia national team, and was called up to the 2006 World Cup. He also played at the World Cups in 1998 and 2002. In addition, he was on the winning Tunisian team at the 2004 African Cup of Nations.

== International goals ==
Scores and results list Tunisia's goal tally first, score column indicates score after each Bouazizi goal.

List of international goals scored by Riadh Bouazizi
No.	Date	Venue	Opponent	Score	Result	Competition
1	15 November 2000	Stade El Menzah, Tunis, Tunisia	Switzerland	1–1	1–1	Friendly
2	30 December 2001	Stade El Menzah, Tunis, Tunisia	Liberia	7–2	7–2	Friendly
3	30 March 2003	Stade Olympique de Radès, Tunis, Tunisia	Cameroon	1–0	1–0	2003 Tunis Four Nations Tournament Final
4	22 January 2006	Harras El-Hedoud Stadium, Alexandria, Egypt	Zambia	2–1	4–1	2006 African Cup of Nations

== Honours ==
Tunisia

- Africa Cup of Nations: 2004
