= Falla N'Doye =

Senegalese football referee (born 1960)

Falla N'Doye (born 4 March 1960) is a football referee from Senegal. He is known for refereeing one match during the 2002 FIFA World Cup. He has also been involved in the CAF Nations Cup, CAF Super Cup and FIFA Club World Cup.
