= Jawhar Mnari =

Tunisian footballer (born 1976)

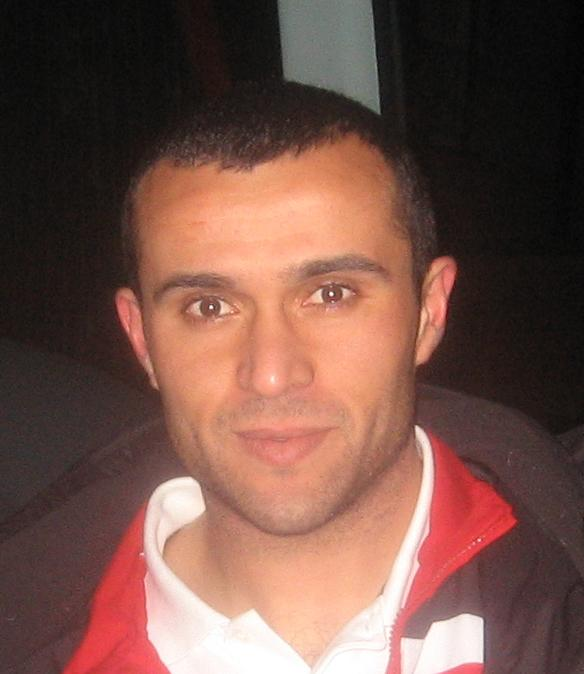
- Jawhar Mnari 2007

Personal information
- Full name: Jawhar Mnari
- Date of birth: 8 November 1976 (age 49)
- Place of birth: Monastir, Tunisia
- Height: 1.84 m (6 ft 0 in)
- Position: Defensive midfielder

Senior career*
Years	Team	Apps	(Gls)
2000–2001	US Monastir	31	(4)
2001–2005	Espérance	132	(16)
2005–2010	1. FC Nürnberg	88	(4)
2010–2011	FSV Frankfurt	8	(0)
Total		259	(24)

International career
2002–2008	Tunisia	44	(3)
Medal record
Men's football
Representing Tunisia
Africa Cup of Nations
Winner	2004 Tunisia
- * Club domestic league appearances and goals

Jawhar Mnari (Arabic: جَوْهَر الْمَنَارِيّ) (born 8 November 1976) is a Tunisian former professional footballer who played as a defensive midfielder.

== Club career ==
Mnari was born in Monastir, Tunisia. In 2005, Mnari moved from Espérance to 1. FC Nürnberg. In 2007, he won the DFB-Pokal in Germany with 1. FC Nürnberg and reached the UEFA-Cup through this. He moved to FSV Frankfurt in 2010.

== International career ==
Mnari was capped 44 times and scored three goals for the Tunisia national team. He scored the first goal against Spain in the 2006 World Cup in the 8th minute to help Tunisia take a 1–0 lead. He was part of the squad that won the 2004 African Cup of Nations.

=== International goals ===
Scores and results list Tunisia's goal tally first, score column indicates score after each Mnari goal.

List of international goals scored by Jawhar Mnari
No.	Date	Venue	Opponent	Score	Result	Competition
1	7 February 2004	Stade Olympique de Radès, Radès, Tunisia	Senegal	1–0	1–0	2004 Africa Cup of Nations
2	19 June 2006	Gottlieb-Daimler-Stadion, Stuttgart, Germany	Spain	1–0	1–3	2006 FIFA World Cup
3	22 August 2007	Stade Olympique de Radès, Radès, Tunisia	Guinea	1–0	1–1	Friendly

== Honours ==
1. FC Nürnberg

- DFB-Pokal (2006–07)

Tunisia

- Africa Cup of Nations: 2004
