= Imed Mhedhebi =

Tunisian footballer

Personal information
- Full name: عماد المهذبى/Imed Mhadhbi
- Date of birth: March 22, 1976 (age 50)
- Place of birth: Ben Arous, Tunisia
- Height: 1.75 m (5 ft 9 in)
- Position: Winger

Senior career*
Years	Team	Apps	(Gls)
1994–2001	Étoile du Sahel		
2001–2003	Genoa	40	(4)
2003–2004	Sfaxien		
2004–2005	Étoile du Sahel	30	(3)
2005–2007	Nantes	10	(0)
2007–2009	Stade Tunisien		

International career
1998–2005	Tunisia	56	(12)
Medal record
Men's football
Representing Tunisia
Africa Cup of Nations
Winner	2004 Tunisia
- * Club domestic league appearances and goals

Imed Mhedhebi or Mhadhbi (Arabic: عماد المهذبى) (born 22 March 1976) is a Tunisian former football winger.

He was a member of the Tunisian national team that participated at the 2002 FIFA World Cup and won the 2004 African Cup of Nations.

On January 27, 2007, he played his first Ligue 1 match for Nantes against Lorient

== Clubs ==
- 1994-2001: Etoile Sahel
- 2001-2003: Genoa C.F.C.
- 2003-2004: CS Sfaxien
- 2004-2005: Etoile Sahel
- 2005-2007: FC Nantes Atlantique
- 2007-2009: Stade Tunisien
- 2009-2010: AS Djerba
- 2010-2012: AEP Paphos FC

== Honours ==
Tunisia

- Africa Cup of Nations: 2004
