= Kaies Ghodhbane =

Tunisian footballer

Personal information
- Full name: Kaies Ghodhbane
- Date of birth: 7 January 1976 (age 50)
- Place of birth: Moknine, Tunisia
- Height: 1.84 m (6 ft 0 in)
- Position: Midfielder

Senior career*
| Years | Team | Apps | (Gls) |
| 1995–2002 | Etoile du Sahel | ? | (?) |
| 2002–2003 | Bani Yas | ? | (?) |
| 2003–2004 | Diyarbakirspor | 25 | (7) |
| 2004–2006 | Samsunspor | 47 | (19) |
| 2006 | Konyaspor | 9 | (1) |
| 2006–2007 | Etoile du Sahel | 3 | (1) |

International career
| 1996–2006 | Tunisia | 92 | (6) |
Medal record
Men's football
Representing Tunisia
Africa Cup of Nations
| Winner | 2004 Tunisia |
| Runner-up | 1996 South Africa |
- * Club domestic league appearances and goals

Kaies Ghodhbane (Arabic: قيس غُضبان; born 7 January 1976) is a Tunisian former professional footballer who played as midfielder.

He has 92 caps for the national team, and was called up to the 2006 World Cup. He also played at the World Cups in 1998 and 2002. In addition he was on the winning Tunisian team at the 2004 African Cup of Nations, and the team that finished second at the 1996 African Cup of Nations.

== Honours ==
Tunisia

- Africa Cup of Nations: 2004
