= Hammadi Agrebi Stadium =

Stadium in Radès, Tunisia

- Mediterranean Pearl
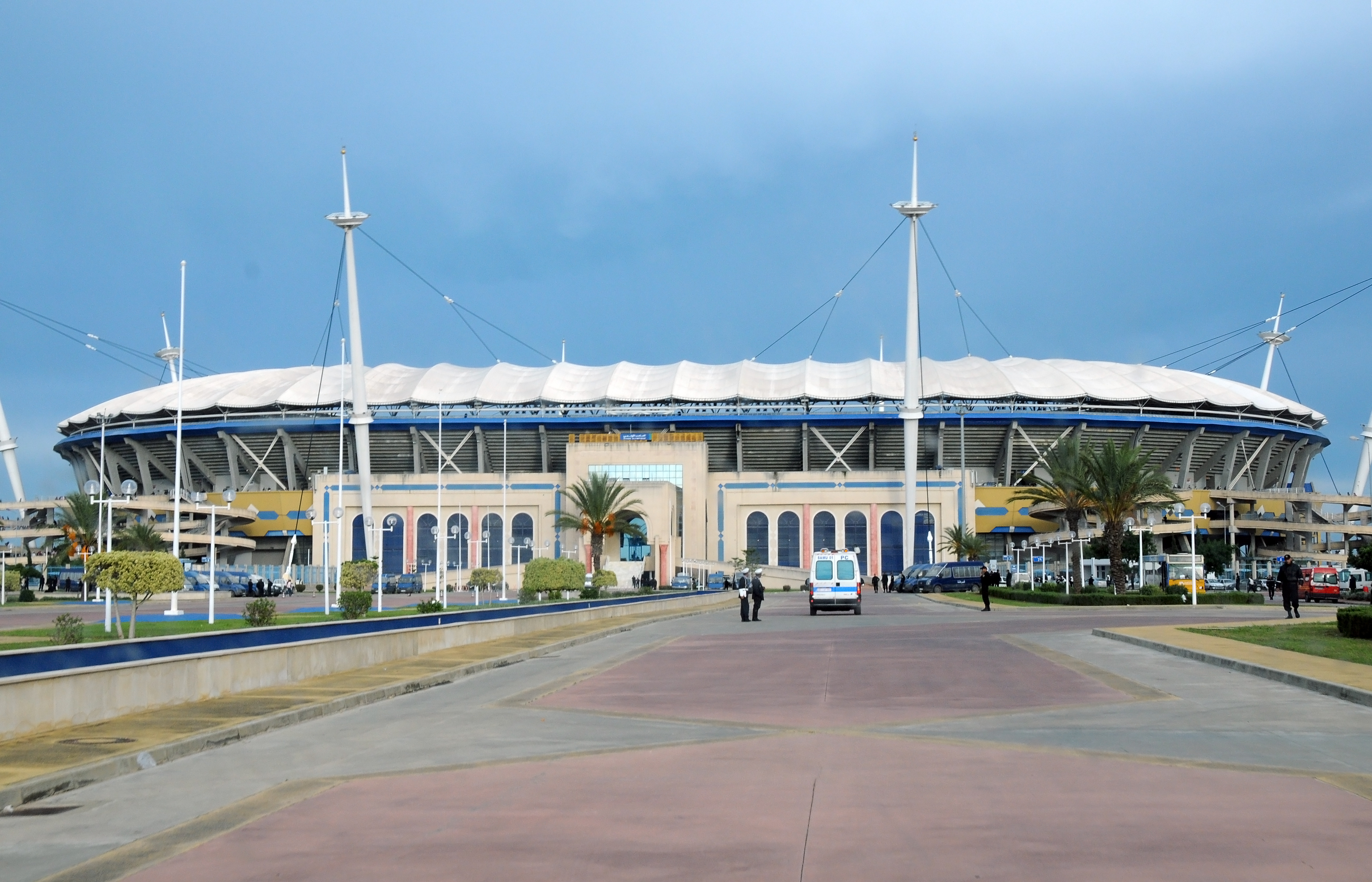
- CAF
- Interactive map of Hammadi Agrebi Stadium
- Full name: Hammadi Agrebi Stadium
- Former names: 7 November Stadium (2001–2011); Radès Olympic Stadium (2011–2020)
- Location: Radès, Tunis, Tunisia
- Coordinates: 36°44′52″N 10°16′22″E
- Owner: Government of Tunisia
- Capacity: 65,000
- Surface: Grass
- Record attendance: 65,000, 2004 Afcon final.
- Field size: Athletics track: 400 m
- Public transit: Southern suburbs train of Tunis

Construction
- Built: 1998–2001
- Opened: 6 July 2001
- Cost: 170 million Dinar
- Architect: Rob Schuurman

Tenants
- Tunisia national football team Espérance Sportive de Tunis; Club Africain

Website
- Official Website

Hammadi Agrebi Stadium (Arabic: ملعب حمادي العقربي), opened as 7 November Stadium, is a multi-purpose stadium located in the Radès Olympic City, located in Radès, in the southern suburb of the city Tunis. The stadium was established in 2001 to host the 2001 Mediterranean Games. The stadium hosts the matches of the Tunisian national team, Esperance de Tunis and Club Africain.

It is a covered amphitheater that can accommodate 60,000 spectators and covers 13,000 square meters. It includes a main field, 3 sub-stadiums, two warm-up halls, two bright blackboards, an honorary platform that can accommodate 7,000 spectators, and a press stand with 300 offices. The stadium was inaugurated in July 2001 under the name Stade 7 November in the framework of the 2000–01 Tunisian Cup final between CS Hammam-Lif and Étoile du Sahel 1–0. The CS Hammam-Lif player, Anis Ben Chouikha, scored the first goal in the history of the stadium. It also hosted 6 matches of the 2004 African Cup of Nations (24 January–14 February 2004), which Tunisia crowned after its 2–1 victory over the Morocco in the final match.

== History ==
The stadium was inaugurated on 6 July 2001 under the name 7 November Stadium in the framework of the 2000–01 Tunisian Cup final between CS Hammam-Lif and Étoile du Sahel (1–0). Hammadi Agrebi Stadium hosted the largest sporting events in Tunisia, most notably the 2001 Mediterranean Games, in which the Tunisian national team won the gold medal of the football tournament after winning the final match 1–0 over Italy. It also hosted six matches of the 2004 African Cup of Nations, which Tunisia won after its 2–1 victory over the Morocco in the final match.

Six matches of the final leg of the CAF Champions League were played on the stadium. In 2006, between the CS Sfaxien and the Egyptian Al-Ahly SC, and in the years 2010, 2011, 2012, 2018 and 2019, during which it faced Esperance de Tunis, respectively, TP Mazembe, Wydad AC twice and Al-Ahly SC twice. Two matches of the first leg of the CAF Confederation Cup final were played on the stadium. In 2011 between Club Africain and Maghreb de Fès, in 2013 between CS Sfaxien and TP Mazembe. Two matches of the CAF Super Cup were played on the stadium: the 2008 edition between Étoile du Sahel and CS Sfaxien, and the 2012 edition between Esperance de Tunis and Maghreb de Fès. The French Professional Football League, which wanted to relocate the Trophée des champions between Olympique de Marseille and Paris Saint-Germain, announced that the 2010 edition will take place at the stadium on 28 July 2010.

In October 2015, the government of Habib Essid announced its intention to mortgage the stadium, a proposal that drew criticism from opposition figures and others before the government withdrew it. The stadium received a Class 1 certificate from the International Association of Athletics Federations, indicating that it met the organization's standards for athletics venues. In May 2020, the stadium was ranked tenth in the world, according to a poll by the Spanish newspaper Marca for the most beautiful stadiums in the world, with 14,000 votes. The stadium recorded the largest number of audiences, estimated at sixty thousand spectators, on two occasions, the first in the final match of the 2004 African Cup of Nations between Tunisia and the Morocco, and the second on 22 May 2008 in the match between Club Africain and ES Zarzis within the framework of the 2007–08 Tunisian Ligue Professionnelle 1.

== Name ==
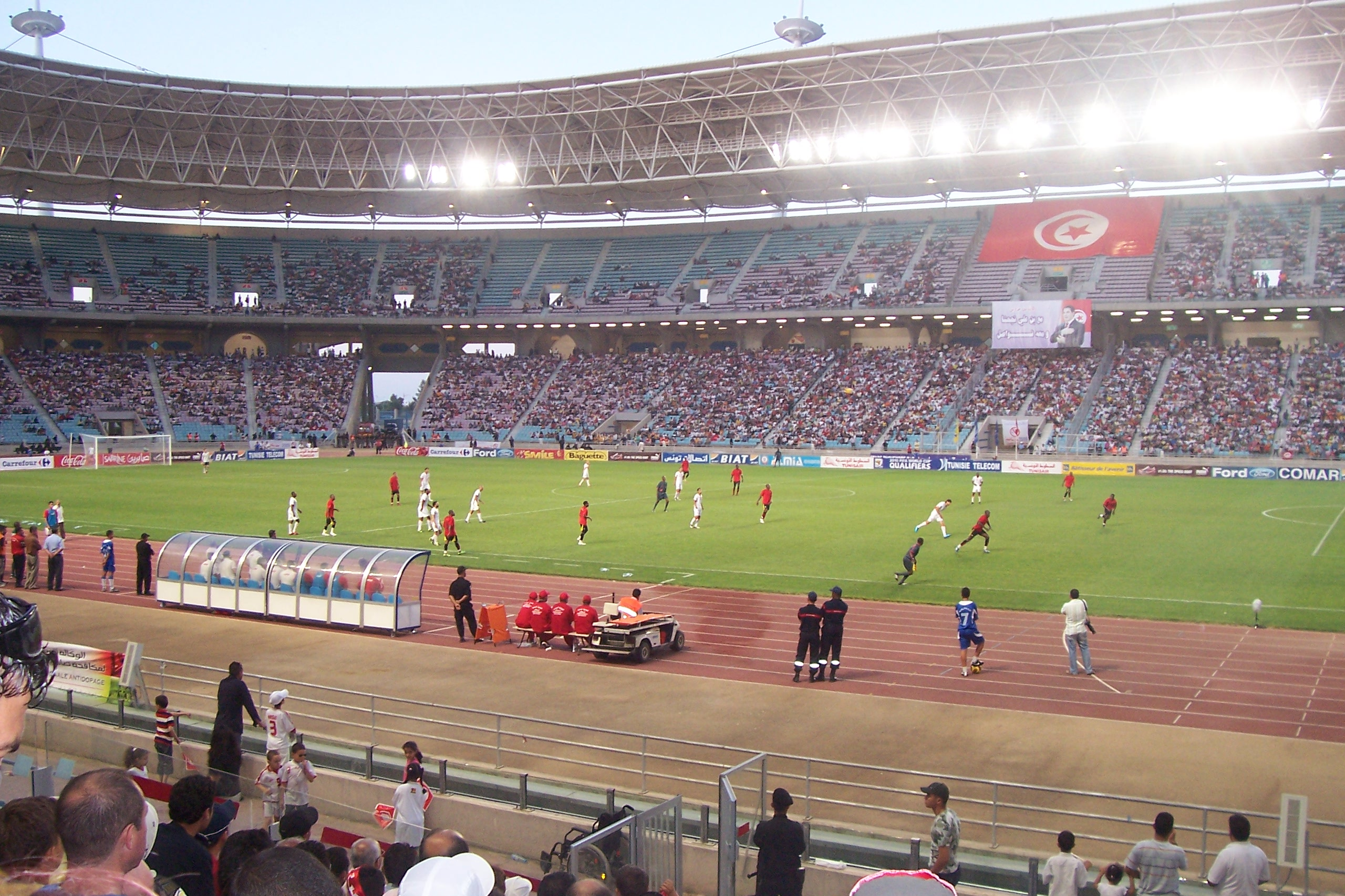
The stadium during a game between the national football teams of Tunisia and Mozambique

When it was built, the stadium was called the 7 November Stadium but, following the 2011 revolution, it took the name of Radès Olympic stadium. On 22 August 2020, following the death of Hammadi Agrebi, the head of government Elyes Fakhfakh announced that he would rename the stadium to his name. The mayor of Radès stated that the municipal council would meet on 24 August to consider the matter. In addition, a decree dated 12 July 2019 stipulates that it is not permitted to give the names of deceased persons to monuments until three years after the date of death.

On 24 August, the Ministry of Local Affairs replied that the stadium was placed under the management of the Ministry of Youth and Sports (not that of the municipality of Radès) and that it did not fall within the framework of the decree of the 12 July 2019, so his name can be changed. A plaque was therefore installed on 1 September with the name of the Stade Olympique Hammadi Agrebi, before being removed. On 21 September, the municipality of Radès files an urgent complaint with the Administrative Court to annul the decision. At the end of 2020, the Tunisian Football Federation, the Confederation of African Football and FIFA use this name, even if the name "Olympic Stadium of Radès" remains common in the media, both Tunisian and foreign.

== International tournament matches ==
=== 2004 African Cup of Nations ===
Date	Time (CET)	Team #1	Result	Team #2	Round	Attendance
24 January 2004	19:30	Tunisia	2–1	Rwanda	Group A (opening match)	60,000
28 January 2004	16:15	Tunisia	3–0	DR Congo	Group A	60,000
1 February 2004	14:00	Tunisia	1–1	Guinea	Group A	35,000
7 February 2004	17:00	Tunisia	1–0	Senegal	Quarter-finals	57,000
11 February 2004	16:00	Tunisia	1–1 (5–3 pen.)	Nigeria	Semi-finals	56,000
14 February 2004	14:30	Tunisia	2–1	Morocco	Final	65,000

=== Tunisia national football team ===
List of Tunisia national football team matches at Hammadi Agrebi Olympic Stadium
Match	Date	Adversary	Result	Competition	Spectators
1	21 August 2002	France	1–1	Friendly Match	60,000
2	20 November 2002	Sweden	1–0	Friendly Match	20,000
3	27 March 2003	Ghana	2–2	2003 Tunis Tournament	30,000
4	30 March 2003	Cameroon	1–0	2003 Tunis Tournament	40,000
5	30 April 2003	Senegal	1–0	Friendly Match	50,000
6	20 August 2003	Guinea	0–0	Friendly Match	8,000
7	24 January 2004	Rwanda	2–1	2004 African Cup of Nations	60,000
8	28 January 2004	DR Congo	3–0	2004 African Cup of Nations	60,000
9	1 February 2004	Guinea	1–1	2004 African Cup of Nations	35,000
10	7 February 2004	Senegal	1–0	2004 African Cup of Nations	60,000
11	11 February 2004	Nigeria	1–1 (5–3)	2004 African Cup of Nations	60,000
12	14 February 2004	Morocco	2–1	2004 African Cup of Nations	60,000
13	31 March 2004	Ivory Coast	0–2	Friendly Match	10,000
14	30 May 2004	Italy	0–4	Friendly Match	30,000
15	5 June 2004	Botswana	4–1	2006 FIFA World Cup qualification	2,844
16	18 August 2004	South Africa	0–2	Friendly Match	4,000
17	26 March 2005	Malawi	7–0	2006 FIFA World Cup qualification	30,000
18	27 May 2005	Angola	4–1	Friendly Match	4,000
19	11 June 2005	Guinea	2–0	2006 FIFA World Cup qualification	30,000
20	11 June 2005	Kenya	1–0	2006 FIFA World Cup qualification	60,000
21	8 October 2005	Morocco	2–2	2006 FIFA World Cup qualification	60,000
22	12 January 2006	Libya	1–0	Friendly Match	17,000
23	15 January 2006	Ghana	2–0	Friendly Match	10,000
24	1 March 2006	Serbia and Montenegro	0–1	Friendly Match	15,000
25	30 May 2006	Belarus	3–0	2006 LG Cup	20,000
26	2 June 2006	Uruguay	0–0 (1–3)	2006 LG Cup	25,000
27	7 October 2006	Sudan	1–0	2008 Africa Cup of Nations qualification	25,000
28	15 November 2006	Libya	2–0	Friendly Match	5,000
29	2 June 2007	Seychelles	4–0	2008 Africa Cup of Nations qualification	5,000
30	16 June 2007	Mauritius	2–0	2008 Africa Cup of Nations qualification	—N/a
31	22 August 2007	Guinea	1–1	Friendly Match	15,000
32	17 November 2007	Namibia	2–0	Friendly Match	5,000
33	6 January 2008	Zambia	1–2	Friendly Match	12,000
34	8 January 2008	Zambia	1–0	Friendly Match	30,000
35	1 June 2008	Burkina Faso	1–2	2010 FIFA World Cup qualification	15,000
36	21 June 2008	Burundi	2–1	2010 FIFA World Cup qualification	6,000
37	11 October 2008	Seychelles	5–0	2010 FIFA World Cup qualification	10,000
38	11 February 2009	Netherlands	1–1	Friendly Match	17,000
39	28 May 2009	Sudan	4–0	Friendly Match	—N/a
40	6 June 2009	Mozambique	2–0	2010 FIFA World Cup qualification	30,000
41	20 June 2009	Nigeria	0–0	2010 FIFA World Cup qualification	45,000
42	11 October 2009	Kenya	1–0	2010 FIFA World Cup qualification	50,000
43	14 October 2009	Saudi Arabia	0–1	Friendly Match	—N/a
44	30 May 2010	France	1–1	Friendly Match	55,000
45	4 September 2010	Malawi	2–2	2012 Africa Cup of Nations qualification	30,000
46	8 October 2011	Togo	2–0	2012 Africa Cup of Nations qualification	5,000
47	29 February 2012	Peru	1–1	Friendly Match	5,000
48	23 March 2013	Sierra Leone	2–1	2014 FIFA World Cup qualification	10,000
49	14 August 2013	Congo	3–0	Friendly Match	4,000
50	7 September 2013	Cape Verde	3–0	2014 FIFA World Cup qualification	9,000
51	13 October 2013	Cameroon	0–0	2014 FIFA World Cup qualification	50,000
52	11 January 2015	Algeria	1–1	Friendly Match	50,000
53	12 June 2015	Djibouti	8–1	2017 Africa Cup of Nations qualification	—N/a
54	9 October 2015	Gabon	3–3	Friendly Match	5,000
55	17 November 2015	Mauritania	2–1	2018 FIFA World Cup qualification	3,000
56	11 June 2017	Egypt	1–0	2019 Africa Cup of Nations qualification	45,000
57	1 September 2017	DR Congo	2–1	2018 FIFA World Cup qualification	30,000
58	11 November 2017	Libya	0–0	2018 FIFA World Cup qualification	56,000
59	23 March 2018	Iran	1–0	Friendly Match	5,000
60	23 March 2018	Niger	1–0	2019 Africa Cup of Nations qualification	20,000
61	20 November 2018	Morocco	0–1	Friendly Match	8,000
62	22 March 2019	Eswatini	4–0	2019 Africa Cup of Nations qualification	5,000
63	7 June 2019	Iraq	2–0	Friendly Match	20,000
64	17 June 2019	Burundi	2–1	Friendly Match	45,000
65	6 September 2019	Mauritania	1–0	Friendly Match	30,000
66	12 October 2019	Cameroon	0–0	Friendly Match	10,000
67	15 November 2019	Libya	4–1	2021 Africa Cup of Nations qualification	20,000
68	9 October 2020	Sudan	3–0	Friendly Match	0 (behind closed doors)
69	13 November 2020	Tanzania	1–0	2021 Africa Cup of Nations qualification	0 (behind closed doors)
70	28 March 2021	Equatorial Guinea	2–1	2021 Africa Cup of Nations qualification	0 (behind closed doors)
71	5 June 2021	DR Congo	1–0	Friendly Match	0 (behind closed doors)
72	11 June 2021	Algeria	0–2	Friendly Match	0 (behind closed doors)
73	15 June 2021	Mali	1–0	Friendly Match	0 (behind closed doors)
74	3 September 2021	Equatorial Guinea	3–0	2022 FIFA World Cup qualification	0 (behind closed doors)
75	7 October 2021	Mauritania	3–0	2022 FIFA World Cup qualification	0 (behind closed doors)
76	16 November 2021	Zambia	3–1	2022 FIFA World Cup qualification	0 (behind closed doors)
77	29 March 2022	Mali	0–0	2022 FIFA World Cup qualification	50,000
78	2 June 2022	Equatorial Guinea	4–0	2023 Africa Cup of Nations qualification	—N/a
79	24 March 2023	Libya	3–0	2023 Africa Cup of Nations qualification	—N/a
80	7 September 2023	Botswana	3–0	2023 Africa Cup of Nations qualification	—N/a
81	17 November 2023	São Tomé and Príncipe	4–0	2026 FIFA World Cup qualification	10,000
82	6 January 2024	Mauritania	0–0	Friendly Match	—N/a
83	10 January 2024	Cape Verde	2–0	Friendly Match	0 (behind closed doors)
84	5 June 2024	Equatorial Guinea	1–0	2026 FIFA World Cup qualification	25,000
85	5 September 2024	Madagascar	1–0	2025 Africa Cup of Nations qualification	—N/a
86	11 October 2024	Comoros	0–1	2025 Africa Cup of Nations qualification	20,000
87	18 November 2024	Gambia	0–1	2025 Africa Cup of Nations qualification	—N/a
88	24 March 2025	Malawi	2–0	2026 FIFA World Cup qualification	30,000
89	2 June 2025	Burkina Faso	2–0	Friendly Match	—N/a
90	4 September 2025	Liberia	3–0	2026 FIFA World Cup qualification	27,000
91	10 October 2025	São Tomé and Príncipe	6–0	2026 FIFA World Cup qualification	5,000
92	13 October 2025	Namibia	3–0	2026 FIFA World Cup qualification	—N/a

== Events hosting ==
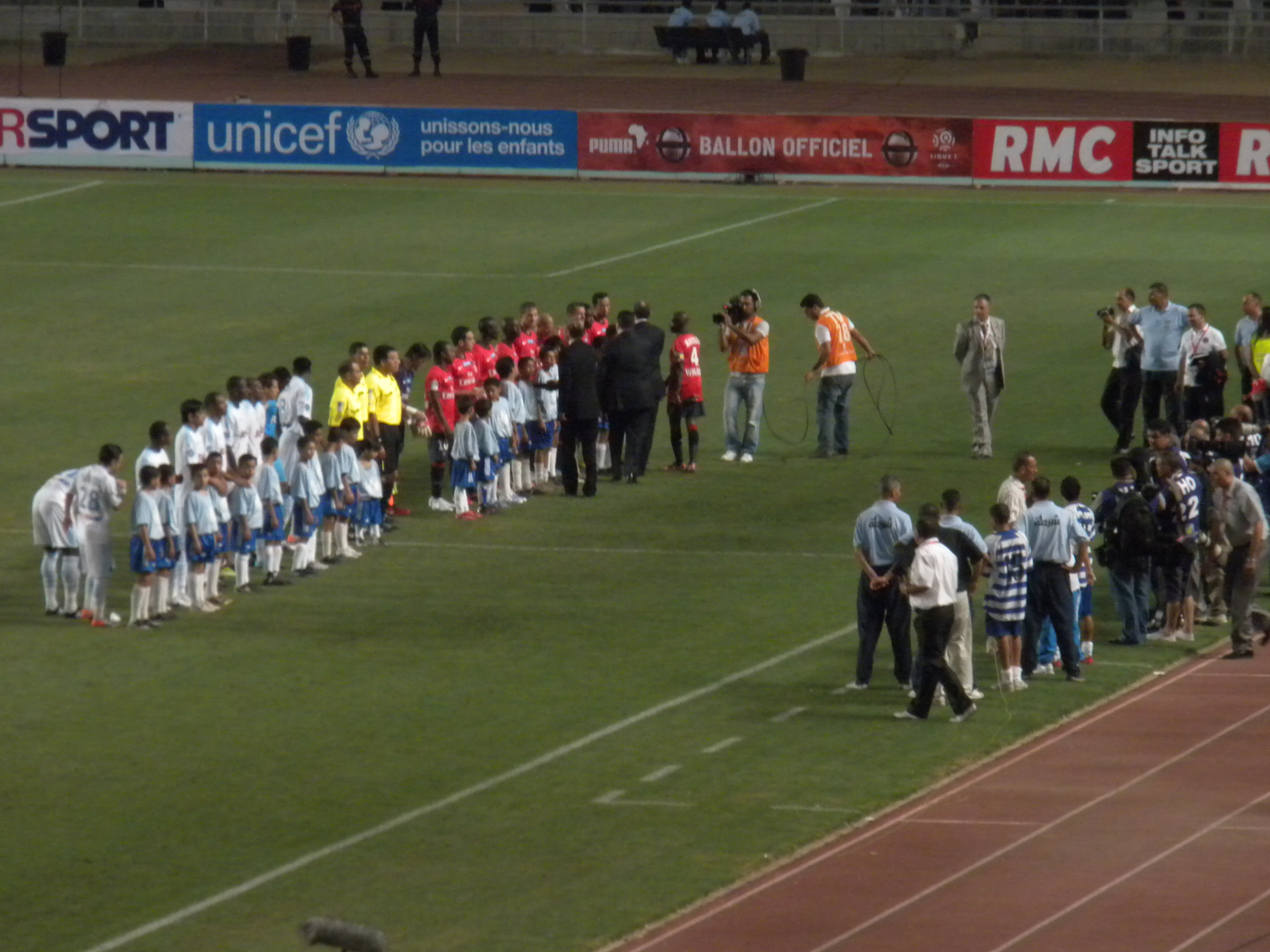
Olympique de Marseille and Paris Saint-Germain line-ups at the 2010 Trophée des Champions.

Arial view of the Radès Olympic City.

Events

- 2001 Mediterranean Games
- 2003 Tunis Four Nations Tournament
- 2004 African Cup of Nations
- 2006 Tunisia LG Cup

Matches

- 2004 Africa Cup of Nations final
- 2006 CAF Champions League final (Second leg)
- 2008 CAF Super Cup
- 2010 Trophée des Champions
- 2010 CAF Champions League final (Second leg)
- 2011 CAF Confederation Cup final (First leg)
- 2012 CAF Super Cup
- 2012 CAF Champions League final (Second leg)
- 2013 CAF Confederation Cup final (First leg)
- 2018 CAF Champions League final (Second leg)
- 2019 CAF Champions League final (Second leg)
- 2021–22 Libyan Cup final
- 2022–23 Libyan Premier League final.

== Certificate ==
The Hammadi Agrebi Olympic Stadium obtains the Class 1 Certificate from the International Association of Athletics Federations (IAAF), which means that it reaches the best standards and specifications in its field. It is one of the best stadiums in North Africa and one of the most beautiful stadiums on the African continent and in the Arab world.

== See also ==
- Salle Omnisport de Rades

Preceded by Stadio San Nicola; Bari	Mediterranean Games; Main Venue; 2001	Succeeded by Mediterranean Stadium; Almería
Preceded by Stade 26 mars Bamako	African Cup of Nations; Final Venue; 2004	Succeeded by Cairo International Stadium; Cairo
