= Tunisia at the Africa Cup of Nations =

Participation of Tunisia in a competition

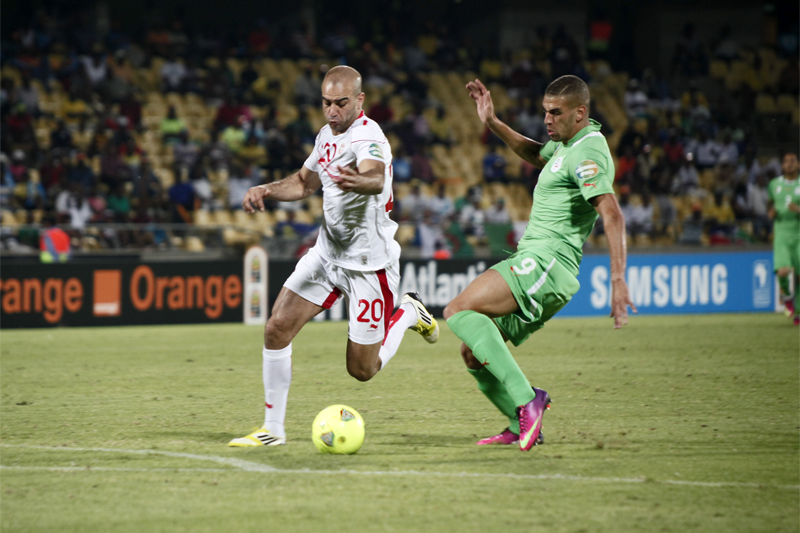
Tunisia against Algeria at the 2013 Africa Cup of Nations in South Africa

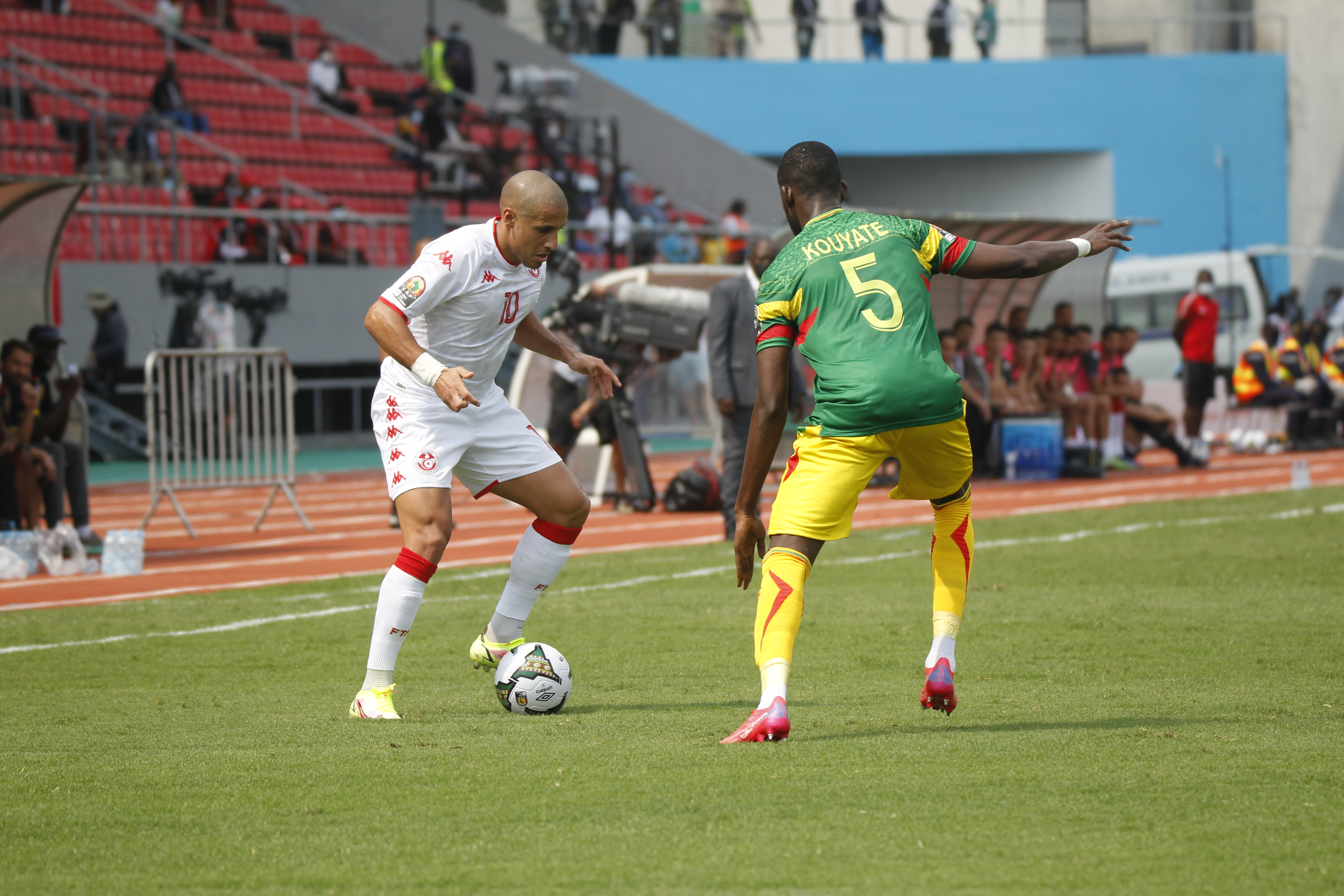
Tunisia against Mali at the 2021 Africa Cup of Nations in Cameroon

Tunisia has participated in the Africa Cup of Nations 22 times, and holds the record for the number of consecutive participations with 17, as the team has not been absent from the competition since the 1994 edition on its home soil. The first participation was in the 1962 edition in Ethiopia. Tunisia played their first match on 14 January 1962 and lost to the host country team 2–4 in the semi-final. However, Tunisia beat Uganda 3–0 in the third place match to win the bronze medal. Tunisia hosted the event for the first time during the 1965 edition, where the team reached the final and lost to the defending champions Ghana 0–2 after extra time to add the silver medal.

In the next two decades, the team participated only twice, finishing fourth in the 1978 edition in Ghana and being eliminated from the group stage in the 1982 edition in Libya. After failing to qualify for the next five editions, the team returned to the competition, hosting the 1994 edition and achieving the worst participation in its history and on home soil after losing to Mali 0–2 and drawing against Zaire 1–1, eliminating it from the group stage. In the 1996 edition, led by Polish coach Henryk Kasperczak, the team reached the final, but lost to hosts South Africa 0–2. Eight years later, in the 2004 edition hosted by Tunisia for the third time, the team won the title for the first time in its history, led by the French coach Roger Lemerre with a respectable generation of players, after defeating Senegal in the quarter-finals and Nigeria in the semi-finals, and defeated Morocco in the final match 2–1.

Since then, the team has not achieved noticeable results, as it was eliminated from the group stage in 2010, 2013 and 2023, exited from the round of 16 in 2025, eliminated from the quarter-finals in 2006, 2008, 2012, 2015, 2017 and 2021, and achieved fourth place in 2019. In total, Tunisia have participated in the African Cup of Nations 22 times, playing 87 matches, with 26 wins, 32 draws and 29 losses, scoring 106 goals and conceding 103. The nation's biggest victories at the tournament were 4–0 wins against Ethiopia on 12 November 1965 and against Mauritania on 16 January 2022. Tunisia's biggest defeats were 3–0 losses against Cameroon on 10 February 2000, against Guinea on 30 January 2006, and against the Ivory Coast on 26 January 2013. Francileudo Santos is the top-scoring Tunisian player at the tournament with ten total goals, while Youssef Msakni has appeared in a record 29 matches across eight tournaments between 2010 and 2023.

== Overall record ==
Africa Cup of Nations record										Africa Cup of Nations qualification record						
Year	Round	Position	Pld	W	D*	L	GF	GA	Squad	Pld	W	D	L	GF	GA	Ref.
(Sudan) 1957	Not affiliated to CAF									Not affiliated to CAF						
(United Arab Republic) 1959	Not affiliated to CAF									Not affiliated to CAF						
(Ethiopia) 1962	Third place	3rd	2	1	0	1	5	4	Squad	4	3	0	1	7	2	
(Ghana) 1963	Group stage	5th	2	0	1	1	3	5	Squad	2	1	0	1	6	5	
(Tunisia) 1965	Runners-up	2nd	3	1	1	1	6	3	Squad	Qualified as hosts						
(Ethiopia) 1968	Did not qualify									4	1	1	2	5	5	
(Sudan) 1970	Did not enter									Did not enter						
(Cameroon) 1972	Did not enter									Did not enter						
(Egypt) 1974	Did not enter									Did not enter						
(Ethiopia) 1976	Did not qualify									6	3	1	2	8	7	
(Ghana) 1978	Fourth place (Note: On 16 March 1978, the third place match of the 1978 African Cup of Nations between Nigeria and Tunisia at the Accra Sports Stadium in Accra, Ghana was abandoned after Tunisia's players walked off at the 42nd minute with the score tied at 1–1 to protest the officiating. The Confederation of African Football awarded a 2–0 win to Nigeria and Tunisia suspended for two years and banned them from the next tournament.)	4th	5	1	2	2	4	5	Squad	4	2	1	1	10	7	
(Nigeria) 1980	Banned									Banned						
(Libya) 1982	Group stage	7th	3	0	1	2	1	4	Squad	2	1	1	0	1	0	
(Ivory Coast) 1984	Did not qualify									4	2	1	1	6	1	
(Egypt) 1986	Did not qualify									2	1	0	1	1	2	
(Morocco) 1988	Did not qualify									2	0	1	1	1	2	
(Algeria) 1990	Did not qualify									2	0	0	2	0	4	
(Senegal) 1992	Did not qualify									6	3	3	0	10	5	
(Tunisia) 1994	Group stage	9th	2	0	1	1	1	3	Squad	Qualified as hosts						
(South Africa) 1996	Runners-up	2nd	6	2	2	2	10	9	Squad	8	3	4	1	7	2	
(Burkina Faso) 1998	Quarter-finals	7th	4	2	1	1	6	5	Squad	3	2	0	1	3	1	
(Ghana) (Nigeria) 2000	Fourth place	4th	6	2	2	2	6	9	Squad	6	5	0	1	13	3	
(Mali) 2002	Group stage	11th	3	0	2	1	0	1	Squad	6	2	2	2	9	7	
(Tunisia) 2004	Champions	1st	6	4	2	0	10	4	Squad	Qualified as hosts						
(Egypt) 2006	Quarter-finals	6th	4	2	1	1	7	5	Squad	10	6	3	1	25	9	
(Ghana) 2008	Quarter-finals	5th	4	1	2	1	7	6	Squad	6	4	1	1	12	3	
(Angola) 2010	Group stage	12th	3	0	3	0	3	3	Squad	12	7	3	2	18	7	
(Equatorial Guinea) (Gabon) 2012	Quarter-finals	6th	4	2	0	2	5	5	Squad	8	4	2	2	14	6	
(South Africa) 2013	Group stage	12th	3	1	1	1	2	4	Squad	2	0	2	0	2	2	
(Equatorial Guinea) 2015	Quarter-finals	7th	4	1	2	1	5	5	Squad	6	4	2	0	6	2	
(Gabon) 2017	Quarter-finals	8th	4	2	0	2	6	7	Squad	6	4	1	1	16	3	
(Egypt) 2019	Fourth place	4th	7	1	4	2	6	5	Squad	6	5	0	1	12	4	
(Cameroon) 2021	Quarter-finals	8th	5	2	0	3	5	3	Squad	6	5	1	0	14	5	
(Ivory Coast) 2023	Group stage	20th	3	0	2	1	1	2	Squad	6	4	1	1	11	1	
(Morocco) 2025	Round of 16	12th	4	1	2	1	7	6	Squad	6	3	1	2	7	6	
(Kenya) (Tanzania) (Uganda) 2027	To be determined									To be determined						
2028	To be determined									To be determined						
Total	Champions	22/35	87	26	32	29	106	103	—	135	75	32	28	224	101	—

== Matches ==
Win Draw Loss

Part	Year	No.	Stage	Date	Opponent	Result	Tunisia scorers	Ref
1	(Ethiopia) 1962	1	Semi-finals	14 January 1962	Ethiopia	2–4	Merrichkou 13' Chérif 29'	
1	(Ethiopia) 1962	2	Third place match	20 January 1962	Uganda	3–0	Jedidi 3' Laaouini 53' Meddab 85'	
2	(Ghana) 1963	3	Group stage	24 November 1963	Ghana	1–1	Jedidi 36'	
2	(Ghana) 1963	4	Group stage	28 November 1963	Ethiopia	2–4	Chetali 15' Jedidi 67'	
3	(Tunisia) 1965	5	Group stage	12 November 1965	Ethiopia	4–0	Chaïbi 32' Jedidi 62' Delhoum 80' Lahmar 84'	
3	(Tunisia) 1965	6	Group stage	14 November 1965	Senegal	0–0	—	
3	(Tunisia) 1965	7	Final	21 November 1965	Ghana	2–3	Chetali 47' Chaïbi 67'	
4	(Ghana) 1978	8	Group stage	6 March 1978	Morocco	1–1	Kaabi 63'	
4	(Ghana) 1978	9	Group stage	9 March 1978	Uganda	3–1	Labidi 36' Ben Aziza 38', 83'	
4	(Ghana) 1978	10	Group stage	11 March 1978	Congo	0–0	—	
4	(Ghana) 1978	11	Semi-finals	14 March 1978	Ghana	0–1	—	
4	(Ghana) 1978	12	Third place match	16 March 1978	Nigeria	0–2 (Awd) (Note: The match was abandoned after Tunisia walked off in the 42nd minute with the score tied at 1–1 to protest the officiating. Nigeria were awarded a 2–0 win, and Tunisia were banned from the next tournament.)	~~Akid 19'~~	
5	(Libya) 1982	13	Group stage	5 March 1982	Cameroon	1–1	Gabsi 60'	
5	(Libya) 1982	14	Group stage	9 March 1982	Libya	0–2	—	
5	(Libya) 1982	15	Group stage	12 March 1982	Ghana	0–1	—	
6	(Tunisia) 1994	16	Group stage	26 March 1994	Mali	0–2	—	
6	(Tunisia) 1994	17	Group stage	30 March 1994	Zaire	1–1	Rouissi 43' (pen.)	
7	(South Africa) 1996	18	Group stage	16 January 1996	Mozambique	1–1	Berkhissa 24'	
7	(South Africa) 1996	19	Group stage	19 January 1996	Ghana	1–2	Ben Younes 72'	
7	(South Africa) 1996	20	Group stage	25 January 1996	Ivory Coast	3–1	Ben Younes 32', 38' Ben Hassen 48'	
7	(South Africa) 1996	21	Quarter-finals	28 January 1996	Gabon	1–1 (4–1 p)	Baya 10'	
7	(South Africa) 1996	22	Semi-finals	31 January 1996	Zambia	4–2	Sellimi 16', 85' (pen.) Baya 20' Ghodhbane 47'	
7	(South Africa) 1996	23	Final	3 February 1996	South Africa	0–2	—	
8	(Burkina Faso) 1998	24	Group stage	9 February 1998	Ghana	0–2	—	
8	(Burkina Faso) 1998	25	Group stage	12 February 1998	DR Congo	2–1	Ben Slimane 31' Tlemcani 76'	
8	(Burkina Faso) 1998	26	Group stage	16 February 1998	Togo	3–1	Tlemcani 9' Ben Slimane 12' Gabsi 80'	
8	(Burkina Faso) 1998	27	Quarter-finals	21 February 1998	Burkina Faso	1–1 (7–8 p)	Gabsi 89'	
9	(Ghana) (Nigeria) 2000	28	Group stage	23 January 2000	Nigeria	2–4	Azaiez 49' Baya 90'	
9	(Ghana) (Nigeria) 2000	29	Group stage	29 January 2000	Morocco	0–0	—	
9	(Ghana) (Nigeria) 2000	30	Group stage	3 February 2000	Congo	1–0	Jaïdi 18'	
9	(Ghana) (Nigeria) 2000	31	Quarter-finals	7 February 2000	Egypt	1–0	Badra 22' (pen.)	
9	(Ghana) (Nigeria) 2000	32	Semi-finals	10 February 2000	Cameroon	0–3	—	
9	(Ghana) (Nigeria) 2000	33	Third place match	12 February 2000	South Africa	2–2 (3–4 p)	Zitouni 27', 89'	
10	(Mali) 2002	34	Group stage	21 January 2002	Zambia	0–0	—	
10	(Mali) 2002	35	Group stage	25 January 2002	Egypt	0–1	—	
10	(Mali) 2002	36	Group stage	31 January 2002	Senegal	0–0	—	
11	(Tunisia) 2004	37	Group stage	24 January 2004	Rwanda	2–1	Jaziri 27' Santos 57'	
11	(Tunisia) 2004	38	Group stage	28 January 2004	DR Congo	3–0	Santos 55', 87' Braham 65'	
11	(Tunisia) 2004	39	Group stage	1 February 2004	Guinea	1–1	Ben Achour 58'	
11	(Tunisia) 2004	40	Quarter-finals	7 February 2004	Senegal	1–0	Mnari 65'	
11	(Tunisia) 2004	41	Semi-finals	11 February 2004	Nigeria	1–1 (5–3 p)	Badra 82'	
11	(Tunisia) 2004	42	Final	14 February 2004	Morocco	2–1	Santos 5' Jaziri 52'	
12	(Egypt) 2006	43	Group stage	22 January 2006	Zambia	4–1	Santos 35', 82', 90+3' Bouazizi 53'	
12	(Egypt) 2006	44	Group stage	26 January 2006	South Africa	2–0	Santos 32' Ben Achour 58'	
12	(Egypt) 2006	45	Group stage	30 January 2006	Guinea	0–3	—	
12	(Egypt) 2006	46	Quarter-finals	4 February 2006	Nigeria	1–1 (5–6 p)	Haggui 49'	
13	(Ghana) 2008	47	Group stage	23 January 2008	Senegal	2–2	Jemâa 9' Traoui 82'	
13	(Ghana) 2008	48	Group stage	27 January 2008	South Africa	3–1	Santos 8', 34' Ben Saada 32'	
13	(Ghana) 2008	49	Group stage	31 January 2008	Angola	0–0	—	
13	(Ghana) 2008	50	Quarter-finals	4 February 2008	Cameroon	2–3 (a.e.t.)	Ben Saada 34' Chikhaoui 81'	
14	(Angola) 2010	51	Group stage	13 January 2010	Zambia	1–1	Dhaouadi 40'	
14	(Angola) 2010	52	Group stage	17 January 2010	Gabon	0–0	—	
14	(Angola) 2010	53	Group stage	21 January 2010	Cameroon	2–2	Chermiti 1' Chedjou 63' (o.g.)	
15	(Equatorial Guinea) (Gabon) 2012	54	Group stage	23 January 2012	Morocco	2–1	Korbi 34' Msakni 76'	
15	(Equatorial Guinea) (Gabon) 2012	55	Group stage	27 January 2012	Niger	2–1	Msakni 4' Jemâa 89'	
15	(Equatorial Guinea) (Gabon) 2012	56	Group stage	27 January 2012	Gabon	0–1	—	
15	(Equatorial Guinea) (Gabon) 2012	57	Quarter-finals	5 February 2012	Ghana	1–2 (a.e.t.)	Khelifa 41'	
16	(South Africa) 2013	58	Group stage	22 January 2013	Algeria	1–0	Msakni 90+1'	
16	(South Africa) 2013	59	Group stage	26 January 2013	Ivory Coast	0–3	—	
16	(South Africa) 2013	60	Group stage	30 January 2013	Togo	1–1	Mouelhi 30' (pen.)	
17	(Equatorial Guinea) 2015	61	Group stage	18 January 2015	Cape Verde	1–1	Manser 70'	
17	(Equatorial Guinea) 2015	62	Group stage	22 January 2015	Zambia	2–1	Akaïchi 70' Chikhaoui 89'	
17	(Equatorial Guinea) 2015	63	Group stage	26 January 2015	DR Congo	1–1	Akaïchi 31'	
17	(Equatorial Guinea) 2015	64	Quarter-finals	31 January 2015	Equatorial Guinea	1–2 (a.e.t.)	Akaïchi 70'	
18	(Gabon) 2017	65	Group stage	15 January 2017	Senegal	0–2	—	
18	(Gabon) 2017	66	Group stage	19 January 2017	Algeria	2–1	Mandi 50' (o.g.) Sliti 66' (pen.)	
18	(Gabon) 2017	67	Group stage	23 January 2017	Zimbabwe	4–2	Sliti 9' Msakni 22' Khenissi 36' Khazri 45' (pen.)	
18	(Gabon) 2017	68	Quarter-finals	28 January 2017	Burkina Faso	0–2	—	
19	(Egypt) 2019	69	Group stage	24 June 2019	Angola	1–1	Msakni 34' (pen.)	
19	(Egypt) 2019	70	Group stage	28 June 2019	Mali	1–1	Khazri 70'	
19	(Egypt) 2019	71	Group stage	2 July 2019	Mauritania	0–0	—	
19	(Egypt) 2019	72	Round of 16	8 July 2019	Ghana	1–1 (5–4 p)	Khenissi 73'	
19	(Egypt) 2019	73	Quarter-finals	11 July 2019	Madagascar	3–0	Sassi 52' Msakni 60' Sliti 90+3'	
19	(Egypt) 2019	74	Semi-finals	14 July 2019	Senegal	0–1 (a.e.t.)	—	
19	(Egypt) 2019	75	Third place match	17 July 2019	Nigeria	0–1	—	
20	(Cameroon) 2021	76	Group stage	12 January 2022	Mali	0–1	—	
20	(Cameroon) 2021	77	Group stage	16 January 2022	Mauritania	4–0	Mathlouthi 4' Khazri 8', 64' Jaziri 66'	
20	(Cameroon) 2021	78	Group stage	20 January 2022	Gambia	0–1	—	
20	(Cameroon) 2021	79	Round of 16	23 January 2022	Nigeria	1–0	Msakni 47'	
20	(Cameroon) 2021	80	Quarter-finals	29 January 2022	Burkina Faso	0–1	—	
21	(Ivory Coast) 2023	81	Group stage	16 January 2024	Namibia	0–1	—	
21	(Ivory Coast) 2023	82	Group stage	20 January 2024	Mali	1–1	Rafia 20'	
21	(Ivory Coast) 2023	83	Group stage	24 January 2024	South Africa	0–0	—	
22	(Morocco) 2025	84	Group stage	23 December 2025	Uganda	3–1	Skhiri 10' Achouri 40', 64'	
22	(Morocco) 2025	85	Group stage	27 December 2025	Nigeria	2–3	Talbi 74' Abdi 87' (pen.)	
22	(Morocco) 2025	86	Group stage	30 December 2025	Tanzania	1–1	Gharbi 43' (pen.)	
22	(Morocco) 2025	87	Round of 16	3 January 2026	Mali	1–1 (2–3 p)	Chaouat 88'	

== Tournaments ==
=== 1962 African Cup of Nations ===
Team 1	Score	Team 2
Semi-finals
Ethiopia	4–2	Tunisia
Third place match
Tunisia	3–0	Uganda

==== Semi-finals ====
14 January 1962

Ethiopia	4–2	Tunisia
L. Vassallo 32' (pen.), 75'; Zeleke 36'; Worku 69'		Merrichkou 13'; Chérif 29'

Hailé Sélassié Stadium, Addis Ababa
Attendance: 30,000

==== Third place match ====
20 January 1962

Tunisia	3–0	Uganda
Jedidi 3'; Laaouini 53'; Meddab 85'

Hailé Sélassié Stadium, Addis Ababa
Referee: M. Lorenzo (Kenya)

=== 1963 African Cup of Nations ===
==== Group stage ====
Pos	Team	Pld	W	D	L	GF	GA	GD	Pts	Qualification
1	Ghana (H)	2	1	1	0	3	1	+2	3	Advance to final
2	Ethiopia	2	1	0	1	4	4	0	2	Advance to third place play-off
3	Tunisia	2	0	1	1	3	5	−2	1	

Rules for classification: Group stage tiebreakers
(H) Hosts
24 November 1963

Ghana	1–1	Tunisia
Mfum 9'		Jedidi 36'

Accra Sports Stadium, Accra
Referee: Mahmoud Hussein Imam (United Arab Republic)

28 November 1963

Ethiopia	4–2	Tunisia
Worku; Zeleke; Tesfaye (Note: The sources differ in recording the scorers in that match. Other alternatives were that Ethiopian scorers were Worku, Getachew Wolde, and a brace by Luciano Vassalo, or Italo Vassalo, L. Vassalo and a brace by Worku. Meanwhile, Tunisian scorers were also given as Jedidi and Raouf Ben Amor, or Chetali and Hammadi Henia, or a brace for Henia.)		Chetali 15'; Jedidi 67'

Accra Sports Stadium, Accra

=== 1965 African Cup of Nations ===
==== Group stage ====
Pos	Team	Pld	W	D	L	GF	GA	GD	Pts	Qualification
1	Tunisia (H)	2	1	1	0	4	0	+4	3 (Note: Tunisia progress on goal average.)	Advance to final
2	Senegal	2	1	1	0	5	1	+4	3	Advance to third place play-off
3	Ethiopia	2	0	0	2	1	9	−8	0	

Rules for classification: Group stage tiebreakers
(H) Hosts
Notes:
12 November 1965

Tunisia	4–0	Ethiopia
Chaïbi 32'; Jedidi 62'; Delhoum 80'; Lahmar 84'

Stade Chedly Zouiten, Tunis

14 November 1965

Senegal	0–0	Tunisia

Stade Chedly Zouiten, Tunis

==== Final ====
21 November 1965

Ghana	3–2 (a.e.t.)	Tunisia
Odoi 37', 96'; Kofi 79'		Chetali 47'; Chaïbi 67'

Stade Chedly Zouiten, Tunis
Attendance: 16,000
Referee: Abdelaziz Chekaïmi (Algeria)

GK	1	John Bortey Naawu
DF	6	Willie Evans
DF	3	Charles Addo Odametey (c)
DF	8	Sam Acquah
DF	16	Ben Kusi
MF	7	Oman Mensah
MF	11	Kofi Pare
MF	17	Kwame Nti
FW	10	Cecil Jones Attuquayefio
FW	14	Osei Kofi
MF	15	Frank Odoi
Substitutions:
	–
Manager:
Charles Kumi Gyamfi

GK	1	Sadok Sassi
DF	2	Mahfoudh Benzarti
DF	3	Hédi Douiri
DF	4	Mohsen Habacha
MF	5	Ahmed Lamine
MF	6	Abdelmajid Chetali (c)
MF	8	Tahar Chaïbi
MF	16	Moncef Ajel
FW	7	Aleya Sassi
FW	9	Rachid Gribaâ	Substituted off
FW	12	Salah Jedidi
Substitutions:
FW	–	Abdelwahab Lahmar	Substituted on
Manager:
Mokhtar Ben Nacef

=== 1978 African Cup of Nations ===
==== Group stage ====
Pos	Team	Pld	W	D	L	GF	GA	GD	Pts	Qualification
1	Uganda	3	2	0	1	7	4	+3	4 (Note: Tied on overall points. Overall goal difference: Uganda +3, Tunisia +2.)	Advance to Knockout stage
2	Tunisia	3	1	2	0	4	2	+2	4	Advance to Knockout stage
3	Morocco	3	1	1	1	2	4	−2	3	
4	Congo	3	0	1	2	1	4	−3	1	

Rules for classification: Group stage tiebreakers
Notes:
6 March 1978

Morocco	1–1	Tunisia
Acila 29'	Report	Kaabi 63'

Kumasi Sports Stadium, Kumasi
Referee: Gebreyesus Tesfaye (Ethiopia)

9 March 1978

Tunisia	3–1	Uganda
Labidi 36'; Ben Aziza 38', 83'	Report	Musenze 71'

Kumasi Sports Stadium, Kumasi
Attendance: 50,000
Referee: Abdelkader Aouissi (Algeria)

11 March 1978

Congo	0–0	Tunisia
	Report

Kumasi Sports Stadium, Kumasi
Attendance: 20,000
Referee: Salem Mohamed Adal (Libya)

==== Semi-finals ====
14 March 1978

Ghana	1–0	Tunisia
Abdul Razak 57'	Report

Accra Sports Stadium, Accra
Attendance: 10,000
Referee: Youssef El Ghoul (Libya)

==== Third place match ====
The match was abandoned after Tunisia walked off in the 42nd minute with the score tied at 1–1 to protest the officiating. Nigeria were awarded a 2–0 win, and Tunisia were suspended for two years (also banning them from the next tournament).

16 March 1978

Nigeria	2–0 (Awarded)	Tunisia
Mohammed 42'	Report	Akid 19'

Accra Sports Stadium, Accra
Referee: Théophile Lawson-Hétchéli (Togo)

=== 1982 African Cup of Nations ===
==== Group stage ====
Pos	Team	Pld	W	D	L	GF	GA	GD	Pts	Qualification
1	Libya (H)	3	1	2	0	4	2	+2	4	Advance to Knockout stage
2	Ghana	3	1	2	0	3	2	+1	4	Advance to Knockout stage
3	Cameroon	3	0	3	0	1	1	0	3	
4	Tunisia	3	0	1	2	1	4	−3	1	

Rules for classification: Group stage tiebreakers
(H) Hosts
5 March 1982

Cameroon	1–1	Tunisia
M'Bida 61'	Report	Gabsi 60'

11 June Stadium, Tripoli
Attendance: 45,000
Referee: Bakary Sarr (Senegal)

9 March 1982

Libya	2–0	Tunisia
Seddik 42' (o.g.); Al-Bor'osi 89'	Report

11 June Stadium, Tripoli
Attendance: 40,000
Referee: Kambaji Kabongo (Zaire)

12 March 1982

Ghana	1–0	Tunisia
John Ebow Essien 28'	Report

11 June Stadium, Tripoli
Attendance: 40,000
Referee: Idrissa Traoré (Mali)

=== 1994 African Cup of Nations ===
==== Group stage ====
The team managed to break the streak by hosting the African Cup of Nations as a replacement for Zaire, but was defeated by Mali 0–2 in the opening match in front of 45,000 people at the El Menzah Stadium, which contributed to the dismissal of Youssef Zouaoui, replaced by Faouzi Benzarti, who drew the second match against Zaire 1–1. Despite positive expectations before the start of the tournament, the team was eliminated from the group stage after a defeat and a draw.

Pos	Team	Pld	W	D	L	GF	GA	GD	Pts	Qualification
1	Zaire	2	1	1	0	2	1	+1	4	Advance to Knockout stage
2	Mali	2	1	0	1	2	1	+1	3	Advance to Knockout stage
3	Tunisia (H)	2	0	1	1	1	3	−2	1	

Rules for classification: Group stage tiebreakers
(H) Hosts
26 March 1994

Tunisia	0–2	Mali
		Coulibaly 25'; Sidibé 34'

Stade El Menzah, Tunis
Attendance: 45,000
Referee: Lim Kee Chong (Mauritius)

30 March 1994

Tunisia	1–1	Zaire
Rouissi 43' (pen.)		Ngoy 55'

Stade El Menzah, Tunis
Attendance: 45,000
Referee: Jamal Al-Sharif (Syria)

=== 1996 African Cup of Nations ===
==== Group stage ====
Pos	Team	Pld	W	D	L	GF	GA	GD	Pts	Qualification
1	Ghana	3	3	0	0	6	1	+5	9	Advance to knockout stage
2	Tunisia	3	1	1	1	5	4	+1	4	Advance to knockout stage
3	Ivory Coast	3	1	0	2	2	5	−3	3	
4	Mozambique	3	0	1	2	1	4	−3	1	

Updated to match(es) played on unknown. Source:
16 January 1996

Tunisia	1–1	Mozambique
Berkhissa 24'		Tico-Tico 4'

EPRU Stadium, Port Elizabeth
Attendance: 1,000
Referee: Charles Masembe (Uganda)

19 January 1996

Ghana	2–1	Tunisia
Pelé 50'; Akonnor 77'		Ben Younes 72'

EPRU Stadium, Port Elizabeth
Attendance: 1,000
Referee: Petros Mathabela (South Africa)

25 January 1996

Tunisia	3–1	Ivory Coast
Ben Younes 32', 38'; Ben Hassen 48'		M. Traoré 84'

EPRU Stadium, Port Elizabeth
Attendance: 1,000
Referee: Sidi Bekaye Magassa (Mali)

==== Quarter-finals ====
28 January 1996

Gabon	1–1 (a.e.t.)	Tunisia
Mackaya 16'	Report	Baya 10'
Penalties
Mackaya (penalty missed); Ngoma (penalty missed); Bekogo (penalty scored)	1–4	(penalty scored) Sellimi; (penalty scored) Fekhi; (penalty scored) Ben Slimane; (penalty scored) El Ouaer

Kings Park Stadium, Durban
Attendance: 4,000
Referee: Lim Kee Chong (Mauritius)

==== Semifinals ====
31 January 1996

Zambia	2–4	Tunisia
Lota 68'; Makasa 90'		Sellimi 16', 85' (pen.); Baya 20'; Ghodhbane 47'

Kings Park Stadium, Durban
Attendance: 5,000
Referee: Lucien Bouchardeau (Niger)

==== Final ====
3 February 1996

South Africa	2–0	Tunisia
Williams 73', 75'

FNB Stadium, Johannesburg
Attendance: 80,000
Referee: Charles Masembe (Uganda)

South Africa	Tunisia

GK	1	Andre Arendse
RB	2	Sizwe Motaung
CB	5	Mark Fish
CB	4	Lucas Radebe
LB	9	Neil Tovey (c)
DM	8	Linda Buthelezi	(yellow card) 29'	(substituted off) 51'
DM	21	Eric Tinkler
AM	15	Doctor Khumalo
AM	10	John Moshoeu
CF	17	Shaun Bartlett
CF	6	Phil Masinga		(substituted off) 65'
Substitutions:
MF	19	Helman Mkhalele		(substituted on) 51'
FW	11	Mark Williams		(substituted on) 65'
Manager:
(South Africa) Clive Barker

GK	1	Chokri El Ouaer (c)
RB	14	Sabri Jaballah
CB	6	Ferid Chouchane
CB	4	Mounir Boukadida
LB	5	Hédi Berkhissa
DM	20	Riadh Bouazizi		(substituted off) 77'
RM	12	Sofiane Fekhi
LM	10	Kaies Ghodhbane		(substituted off) 46'
AM	8	Zoubeir Baya
CF	18	Mehdi Ben Slimane
CF	11	Adel Sellimi
Substitutions:
DF	21	Lassad Hanini	(yellow card) 67'	(substituted on) 46'
FW	9	Abdelkader Ben Hassen		(substituted on) 77'
Manager:
(Poland) Henryk Kasperczak

=== 1998 African Cup of Nations ===
==== Group stage ====
Pos	Team	Pld	W	D	L	GF	GA	GD	Pts	Qualification
1	Tunisia	3	2	0	1	5	4	+1	6	Advance to knockout stage
2	DR Congo	3	2	0	1	4	3	+1	6	Advance to knockout stage
3	Ghana	3	1	0	2	3	3	0	3	
4	Togo	3	1	0	2	4	6	−2	3	

Updated to match(es) played on unknown. Source:
9 February 1998
20:30

Ghana	2–0	Tunisia
Nyarko 8'; Gargo 90'

Stade du 4 Août, Ouagadougou
Attendance: 12,000
Referee: Ian McLeod (South Africa)

12 February 1998
16:00

Tunisia	2–1	DR Congo
Ben Slimane 31'; Tlemcani 76'		Kimoto 36'

Stade Municipal, Ouagadougou
Attendance: 1,000
Referee: Kine Tibebu (Ethiopia)

16 February 1998
17:00

Tunisia	3–1	Togo
Tlemcani 9'; Ben Slimane 12'; Gabsi 80'		Assignon 4' (pen.)

Stade Municipal, Ouagadougou
Attendance: 800
Referee: Pierre Mounguegui (Gabon)

==== Quarter-finals ====
21 February 1998
17:00

Tunisia	1–1 (a.e.t.)	Burkina Faso
Gabsi 89'	Report	K. Ouédraogo 45' (pen.)
Penalties
Rouissi (penalty scored); Badra (penalty scored); Bouazizi (penalty scored); Chihi (penalty missed); Jelassi (penalty scored); Baya (penalty missed); Gabsi (penalty scored); Ghodhbane (penalty scored); Hicheri (penalty scored); Trabelsi (penalty missed)	7–8	(penalty scored) S. Traoré; (penalty scored) F. Sanou; (penalty scored) Nana; (penalty missed) Tallé; (penalty scored) A. Ouédraogo; (penalty missed) Zongo; (penalty scored) B. Traoré; (penalty scored) Diabaté; (penalty scored) Liade Gnonka; (penalty scored) Coulibaly

Stade du 4 Août, Ouagadougou
Attendance: 37,000
Referee: Lim Kee Chong (Mauritius)

=== 2000 African Cup of Nations ===
==== Group stage ====
Pos	Team	Pld	W	D	L	GF	GA	GD	Pts	Qualification
1	Nigeria (H)	3	2	1	0	6	2	+4	7	Advance to knockout stage
2	Tunisia	3	1	1	1	3	4	−1	4	Advance to knockout stage
3	Morocco	3	1	1	1	1	2	−1	4	
4	Congo	3	0	1	2	0	2	−2	1	

Updated to match(es) played on unknown. Source:
(H) Hosts
23 January 2000
16:00

Nigeria	4–2	Tunisia
Okocha 28', 58'; Ikpeba 71', 77'		Sellimi 49'; Baya 90'

National Stadium, Lagos
Attendance: 80,000
Referee: Alain Sars (France)

29 January 2000
16:00

Tunisia	0–0	Morocco

National Stadium, Lagos
Attendance: 5,000
Referee: Falla N'Doye (Senegal)

3 February 2000
17:00

Tunisia	1–0	Congo
Jaïdi 18'

Sani Abacha Stadium, Kano
Attendance: 12,000
Referee: Ali Bujsaim (United Arab Emirates)

==== Quarter-finals ====
7 February 2000
16:00

Egypt	0–1	Tunisia
		Badra 22' (pen.)

Sani Abacha Stadium, Kano
Attendance: 12,000
Referee: Alain Sars (France)

==== Semifinals ====
10 February 2000
18:30

Cameroon	3–0	Tunisia
M'Boma 49', 85'; Eto'o 81'

Accra Sports Stadium, Accra
Attendance: 6,000
Referee: Ali Bujsaim (United Arab Emirates)

==== Third place match ====
12 February 2000
16:00

South Africa	2–2 (a.e.t.)	Tunisia
Bartlett 11'; Nomvethe 62'	Report	Zitouni 27', 89'
Penalties
Bartlett (penalty missed); Mkhalele (penalty scored); Ndlanya (penalty missed); Tinkler (penalty scored); Moshoeu (penalty scored); Bapela (penalty scored)	4–3	(penalty missed) Chihi; (penalty missed) Jaziri; (penalty scored) Gabsi; (penalty scored) Boukadida; (penalty scored) Badra; (penalty missed) Zitouni

Accra Sports Stadium, Accra
Attendance: 1,000
Referee: Coffi Codjia (Benin)

=== 2002 African Cup of Nations ===
==== Group stage ====
Pos	Team	Pld	W	D	L	GF	GA	GD	Pts	Qualification
1	Senegal	3	2	1	0	2	0	+2	7	Advance to knockout stage
2	Egypt	3	2	0	1	3	2	+1	6	Advance to knockout stage
3	Tunisia	3	0	2	1	0	1	−1	2	
4	Zambia	3	0	1	2	1	3	−2	1	

Updated to match(es) played on unknown. Source:
21 January 2002
19:00

Zambia	0–0	Tunisia

Stade Modibo Kéïta, Bamako
Attendance: 6,000
Referee: Koman Coulibaly (Mali)

25 January 2002
15:30

Egypt	1–0	Tunisia
Emam 23'

Stade Modibo Kéïta, Bamako
Attendance: 3,000
Referee: Arturo Daudén Ibáñez (Spain)

31 January 2002
16:00

Senegal	0–0	Tunisia

Stade Abdoulaye Nakoro Cissoko, Kayes
Attendance: 8,000
Referee: Domenico Messina (Italy)

=== 2004 African Cup of Nations ===
As hosts, Tunisia did not have to qualify for the 2004 African Cup of Nations, where they face DR Congo, Rwanda and Guinea in the first round. The team won his opening match against Rwanda 2–1, thanks to goals from Ziad Jaziri and Francileudo Santos, despite the expulsion of Selim Benachour in the 60th minute with a red card. The second match against DR Congo is difficult until the Congolese Lomana LuaLua is sent off with a red card in the first half, after a frank attack on Jawhar Mnari. Thanks to Hatem Trabelsi on the right flank, the team managed to win the match 3–0 with a double from Dos Santos in the 55th and 87th minutes and a goal by Najeh Braham in the 65th minute. On the day of the third match, corresponding to eid al-Adha, 35,000 spectators came to the stadium. Guinea managed to snatch the equalizing point after the end of the game with the score at 1–1, Benachour scoring Tunisia's goal in the 58th minute, followed by a Guinean goal from Titi Camara in the last minutes of the match. Tunisia qualified for the quarter-finals on top of the group with seven points, after two wins and a draw.

"This group never flinched and now we have written something on the blank page that was Tunisia's roll of honour."

— Tunisia gialkeeper Ali Boumnijel's statement to The Guardian after winning the title.

In the quarter-finals, Senegal who had already beaten Lemerre as France coach 1–0 in the 2002 World Cup, faced him; Tunisia also won this game 1–0, with Mnari scoring in the second half after a scissor kick from Jaziri; this match is notorious for the appearance of fog on the pitch. In the semi-finals, Nigeria which had eliminated Cameroon. The match becomes very even until the end of playing time 1–1. The first goal was scored by Nigerian Jay-Jay Okocha, who scored a penalty after Tunisian defender Karim Haggui beat Nwankwo Kanu in the penalty area. Fifteen minutes later, Nigerian defender Seyi Olofinjana broke Tunisian striker Jaziri in the penalty area, with whom Tunisia also received a penalty. The Tunisian captain Khaled Badra equalized the score 1–1. The match is finally decided in the penalty shootout, which Tunisia wins 5–3 thanks to Haggui who takes the last shot. With the victory. Tunisia reached the final, where they faced Morocco.

During the final, on 14 February 2004 at Stade 7 November in Radès in front of 60,000 supporters, Tunisia got off to a good start with a lead 1–0 after four minutes with Mehdi Nafti centered on Dos Santos, who scored his fourth goal of the tournament. At the end of the first half, Morocco came back to score with a goal from Youssouf Hadji on a lift from Youssef Mokhtari. Seven minutes passed in the second half before another Tunisian striker, Jaziri gave his country the lead. As soon as referee Falla N'Doye blew the final whistle, scenes of jubilation erupted in the stadium and throughout the country. The Tunisian players performed a circuit of the pitch, then climbed onto the podium to receive their gold medals, while the Moroccan players received their silver medals. Later, President Ben Ali presented the trophy to Khaled Badra and Riadh Bouazizi, who then raised it high. The Eagles of Carthage became the 13th national team in history to be crowned African champions. Roger Lemerre also becomes the first coach to win two different continental tournaments after having previously won Euro 2000 with France. On 24 February, Ben Ali received the Tunisian team at the Carthage Palace, accompanied by members of the technical and administrative staff, and awarded them the National Order of Merit. Tunisia also won the African National Team of the Year award from the Confederation of African Football.

==== Group stage ====
Pos	Team	Pld	W	D	L	GF	GA	GD	Pts	Qualification
1	Tunisia (H)	3	2	1	0	6	2	+4	7	Advance to knockout stage
2	Guinea	3	1	2	0	4	3	+1	5	Advance to knockout stage
3	Rwanda	3	1	1	1	3	3	0	4	
4	DR Congo	3	0	0	3	1	6	−5	0	

(H) Hosts
24 January 2004
19:30

Tunisia	2–1	Rwanda
Jaziri 27'; Santos 57'	Report	Elias 31'

7 November Stadium, Tunis
Attendance: 60,000
Referee: Raphaël Evehe Divine (Cameroon)

28 January 2004
16:15

Tunisia	3–0	DR Congo
Santos 55', 87'; Braham 65'	Report

7 November Stadium, Tunis
Attendance: 60,000
Referee: Jerome Damon (South Africa)

1 February 2004
14:00

Tunisia	1–1	Guinea
Ben Achour 58'	Report	T. Camara 84'

7 November Stadium, Tunis
Attendance: 35,000
Referee: Hailemalek Tessama (Ethiopia)

==== Quarter-finals ====
7 February 2004
17:00

Tunisia	1–0	Senegal
Mnari 65'	Report

7 November Stadium, Tunis
Attendance: 60,000
Referee: Ali Bujsaim (United Arab Emirates)

==== Semi-finals ====
11 February 2004
16:00

Tunisia	1–1 (a.e.t.)	Nigeria
Badra 82' (pen.)	Report	Okocha 67' (pen.)
Penalties
Badra (penalty scored); Santos (penalty scored); Mhedhebi (penalty scored); Ben Achour (penalty scored); Haggui (penalty scored)	5–3	(penalty scored) Utaka; (penalty missed) Odemwingie; (penalty scored) Yobo; (penalty scored) Udeze

7 November Stadium, Tunis
Attendance: 60,000
Referee: Coffi Codjia (Benin)

==== Final ====
14 February 2004
14:30

Tunisia	2–1	Morocco
Santos 5'; Jaziri 52'	Report	Mokhtari 38'

7 November Stadium, Tunis
Attendance: 60,000
Referee: Falla N'Doye (Senegal)

Tunisia	Morocco

GK	1	Ali Boumnijel
RB	13	Riadh Bouazizi (c)
CB	3	Karim Haggui
CB	15	Radhi Jaïdi
LB	8	Mehdi Nafti		(substituted off) 46'
CM	6	Hatem Trabelsi
CM	14	Adel Chedli
CM	20	José Clayton
AM	18	Selim Benachour		(substituted off) 57'
CF	11	Francileudo Santos
CF	5	Ziad Jaziri	(yellow card) 60'	(substituted off) 70'
Substitutions:
MF	12	Jawhar Mnari		(substituted on) 46'
MF	10	Kaies Ghodhbane		(substituted on) 57'
FW	7	Imed Mhedhebi		(substituted on) 70'
Manager:
(France) Roger Lemerre

GK	1	Khalid Fouhami
CB	5	Talal El Karkouri
CB	6	Noureddine Naybet (c)	(yellow card) 77'
CB	4	Abdeslam Ouaddou
RM	2	Walid Regragui	(yellow card) 90'
CM	15	Youssef Safri		(substituted off) 63'
CM	8	Abdelkarim Kissi
LM	3	Akram Roumani	(yellow card) 22'	(substituted off) 70'
AM	16	Youssef Mokhtari
CF	20	Youssef Hadji		(substituted off) 86'
CF	17	Marouane Chamakh
Substitutions:
MF	11	Moha El Yaagoubi		(substituted on) 63'
FW	7	Jaouad Zaïri		(substituted on) 70'
FW	9	Nabil Baha		(substituted on) 86'
Manager:
Ezzaki Badou

Assistant referees:
Ali Tomusange (Uganda)
Brighton Mudzamiri (Zimbabwe)
Fourth official:
Coffi Codjia (Benin)

Match rules

- 90 minutes.
- 30 minutes of extra time if necessary.
- Penalty shoot-out if scores still level.

=== 2006 Africa Cup of Nations ===
==== Group stage ====
Pos	Team	Pld	W	D	L	GF	GA	GD	Pts	Qualification
1	Guinea	3	3	0	0	7	1	+6	9	Advance to knockout stage
2	Tunisia	3	2	0	1	6	4	+2	6	Advance to knockout stage
3	Zambia	3	1	0	2	3	6	−3	3	
4	South Africa	3	0	0	3	0	5	−5	0	

Updated to match(es) played on unknown. Source:
22 January 2006
17:15

Tunisia	4–1	Zambia
Santos 35', 82', 90+3'; Bouazizi 53'		Chamanga 9'

Harras El-Hedoud Stadium, Alexandria
Attendance: 16,000
Referee: Eddy Maillet (Seychelles)

26 January 2006
20:00

Tunisia	2–0	South Africa
Santos 32'; Benachour 58'

Harras El-Hedoud Stadium, Alexandria
Attendance: 10,000
Referee: Evehe Divine (Cameroon)

30 January 2006
19:00

Tunisia	0–3	Guinea
		O. Bangoura 16'; Feindouno 70'; Diawara 90+1'

Harras El-Hedoud Stadium, Alexandria
Attendance: 18,000
Referee: Shamsul Maidin (Singapore)

==== Quarter-finals ====
4 February 2006
15:00

Nigeria	1–1 (a.e.t.)	Tunisia
Obinna 6'	Report	Haggui 49'
Penalties
Yobo (penalty missed); Taiwo (penalty scored); Ayila (penalty missed); Obinna (penalty scored); Martins (penalty scored); Mikel (penalty scored); Enyeama (penalty scored); Kanu (penalty scored)	6–5	(penalty scored) Namouchi; (penalty scored) Guemamdia; (penalty missed) Chedli; (penalty missed) Benachour; (penalty scored) Clayton; (penalty scored) Boumnijel; (penalty scored) Massaoud; (penalty missed) Bouazizi

Port Said Stadium, Port Said
Attendance: 10,000
Referee: Eddy Maillet (Seychelles)

=== 2008 Africa Cup of Nations ===
Lemerre led Tunisia to qualify for the 2008 African Cup of Nations. In the qualification Tunisia faced Mauritius, Sudan, and Seychelles. After 4 wins and 1 draw, Tunisia suffered a 3–2 loss against Sudan and finished second in the qualifying round. Despite this, Tunisia were among the favorite teams to win the cup after its outstanding performance in recent years in addition to the presence of 7 players from Étoile du Sahel, champions of CAF Champions League, and Tunisia was able to qualify for the quarter-finals. Tunisia finished at the top of the group after a draw in the opening match against Senegal 2–2, a 3–1 victory over South Africa, In the third match, it faced Angola and the match ended 0–0. They lost against Cameroon 3–2 in extra time.

==== Group stage ====
Pos	Team	Pld	W	D	L	GF	GA	GD	Pts	Qualification
1	Tunisia	3	1	2	0	5	3	+2	5	Advance to knockout stage
2	Angola	3	1	2	0	4	2	+2	5	Advance to knockout stage
3	Senegal	3	0	2	1	4	6	−2	2	
4	South Africa	3	0	2	1	3	5	−2	2	

Updated to match(es) played on unknown. Source:
23 January 2008
17:00

Tunisia	2–2	Senegal
Jemâa 9'; Traoui 82'	Report	Sall 45'; D. Kamara 66'

Tamale Stadium, Tamale
Attendance: 12,000
Referee: Yuichi Nishimura (Japan)

27 January 2008
19:30

Tunisia	3–1	South Africa
Santos 8', 34'; Ben Saada 32'	Report	Mphela 87'

Tamale Stadium, Tamale
Attendance: 15,000
Referee: Kokou Djaoupe (Togo)

31 January 2008
17:00

Tunisia	0–0	Angola
	Report

Tamale Stadium, Tamale
Attendance: 10,000
Referee: Coffi Codjia (Benin)

==== Quarter-finals ====
4 February 2008
20:30

Tunisia	2–3 (a.e.t.)	Cameroon
Ben Saada 34'; Chikhaoui 81'	Report	Mbia 18', 93'; Geremi 27'

Tamale Stadium, Tamale
Attendance: 15,000
Referee: Koman Coulibaly (Mali)

=== 2010 Africa Cup of Nations ===
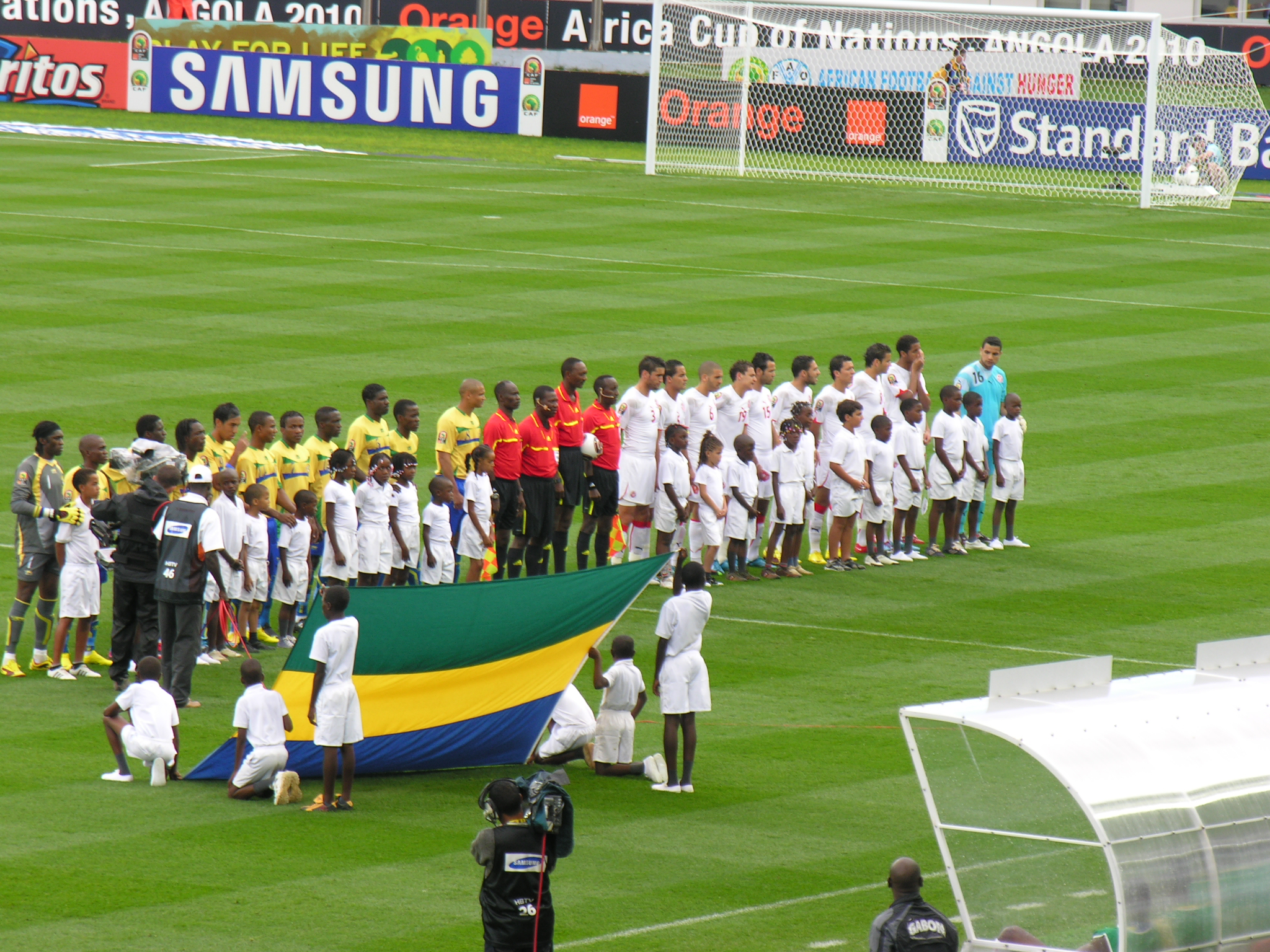
Tunisia v Gabon at the 2010 Africa Cup of Nations in Angola

Tunisia failed to be in the 2010 FIFA World Cup, but qualified for the 2010 Africa Cup of Nations. Four days later, the Tunisian Football Federation sacked coach Humberto Coelho and at the same time appointed Faouzi Benzarti as the new coach to oversee the national team in the 2010 Africa Cup of Nations. He was also eliminated after Tunisia were eliminated from the group stage, where all three matches were tied against Zambia 1–1, Gabon 0–0 and Cameroon 2–2. Ending the session at the bottom of the group.

==== Group stage ====
Pos	Team	Pld	W	D	L	GF	GA	GD	Pts	Qualification
1	Zambia	3	1	1	1	5	5	0	4 (Note: The tie-breaking criteria for teams level on points consider only the results of matches between those teams (in this case, this excludes their results against Tunisia). All three teams were level on points and goal difference, and were ranked based on goals scored: Zambia 4, Cameroon 3, Gabon 2.)	Advance to knockout stage
2	Cameroon	3	1	1	1	5	5	0	4	Advance to knockout stage
3	Gabon	3	1	1	1	2	2	0	4	
4	Tunisia	3	0	3	0	3	3	0	3	

Source: CAF
Notes:
13 January 2010
19:30

Zambia	1–1	Tunisia
J. Mulenga 19'	Report	Dhaouadi 40'

Estádio Alto da Chela, Lubango
Attendance: 17,000
Referee: Koman Coulibaly (Mali)

17 January 2010
17:00

Gabon	0–0	Tunisia
	Report

Estádio Alto da Chela, Lubango
Attendance: 16,000
Referee: Coffi Codjia (Benin)

21 January 2010
17:00

Cameroon	2–2	Tunisia
Eto'o 47'; N'Guémo 64'	Report	Chermiti 1'; Chedjou 63' (o.g.)

Estádio Alto da Chela, Lubango
Attendance: 19,000
Referee: Noumandiez Désiré Doué (Ivory Coast)

=== 2012 Africa Cup of Nations ===
==== Group stage ====
Pos	Team	Pld	W	D	L	GF	GA	GD	Pts	Qualification
1	Gabon (H)	3	3	0	0	6	2	+4	9	Advance to knockout stage
2	Tunisia	3	2	0	1	4	3	+1	6	Advance to knockout stage
3	Morocco	3	1	0	2	4	5	−1	3	
4	Niger	3	0	0	3	1	5	−4	0	

Source: CAF
(H) Hosts
23 January 2012
20:00

Morocco	1–2	Tunisia
Kharja 86'	Report	Korbi 34'; Msakni 76'

Stade d'Angondjé, Libreville
Attendance: 28,000
Referee: Daniel Bennett (South Africa)

27 January 2012
17:00

Niger	1–2	Tunisia
N'Gounou 9'	Report	Msakni 4'; Jemâa 89'

Stade d'Angondjé, Libreville
Attendance: 20,000
Referee: Janny Sikazwe (Zambia)

31 January 2012
19:00

Gabon	1–0	Tunisia
Aubameyang 61'	Report

Stade de Franceville, Franceville
Attendance: 22,000
Referee: Noumandiez Doué (Ivory Coast)

==== Quarter-finals ====
5 February 2012
20:00

Ghana	2–1 (a.e.t.)	Tunisia
John Mensah 9'; A. Ayew 100'	Report	Khelifa 41'

Stade de Franceville, Franceville
Attendance: 8,000
Referee: Néant Alioum (Cameroon)

=== 2013 Africa Cup of Nations ===
==== Group stage ====
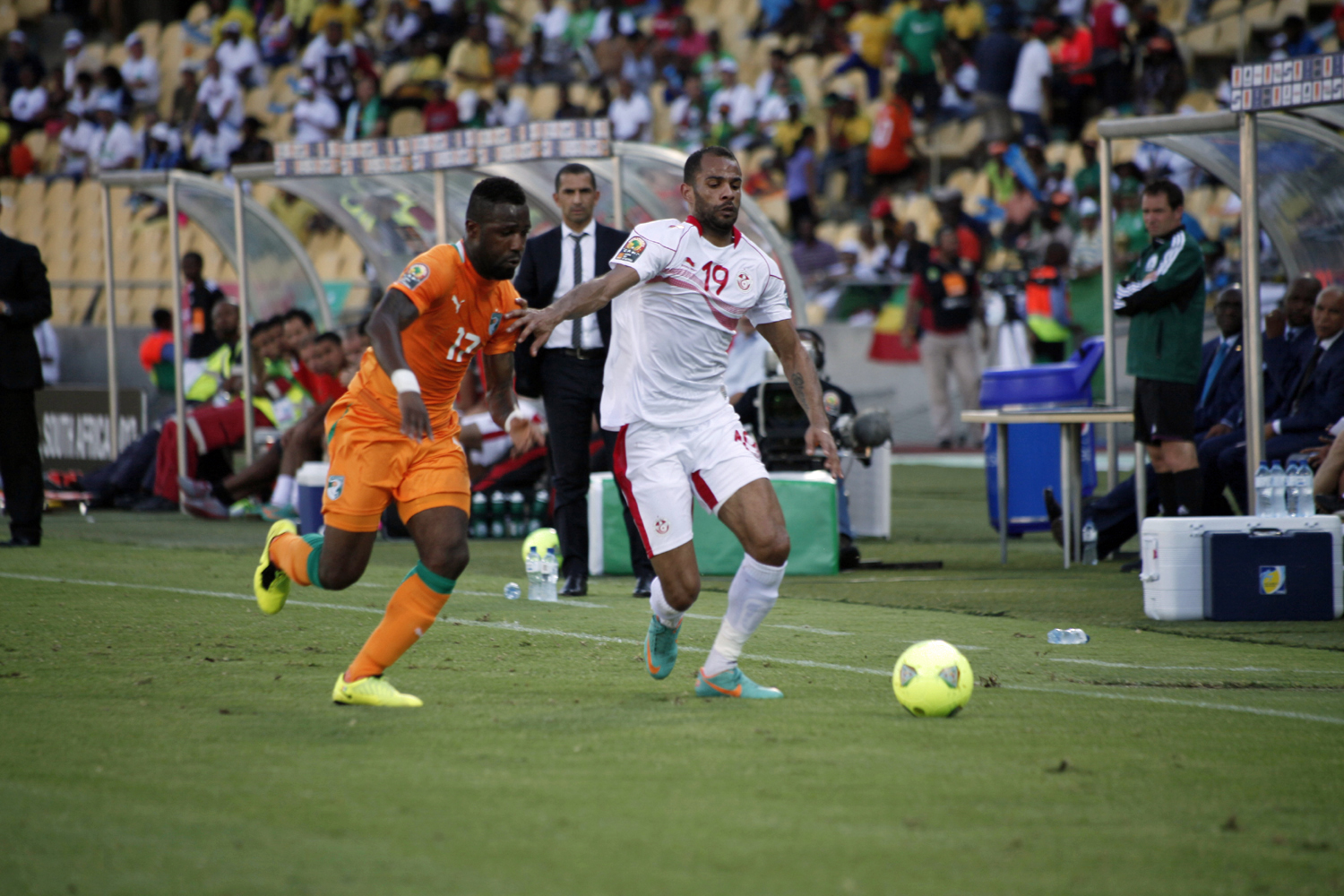
Tunisia v Ivory Coast at the 2013 Africa Cup of Nations in South Africa, where the team suffered its joint-heaviest defeat

Pos	Team	Pld	W	D	L	GF	GA	GD	Pts	Qualification
1	Ivory Coast	3	2	1	0	7	3	+4	7	Advance to knockout stage
2	Togo	3	1	1	1	4	3	+1	4	Advance to knockout stage
3	Tunisia	3	1	1	1	2	4	−2	4	
4	Algeria	3	0	1	2	2	5	−3	1	

Source: CAF
22 January 2013
20:00

Tunisia	1–0	Algeria
Msakni 90+1'	Report

Royal Bafokeng Stadium, Rustenburg
Attendance: 10,000
Referee: Bakary Gassama (Gambia)

26 January 2013
17:00

Ivory Coast	3–0	Tunisia
Gervinho 21'; Y. Touré 87'; Ya Konan 90'	Report

Royal Bafokeng Stadium, Rustenburg
Attendance: 20,000
Referee: Rajindraparsad Seechurn (Mauritius)

30 January 2013
19:00

Togo	1–1	Tunisia
Gakpé 13'	Report	Mouelhi 30' (pen.)

Mbombela Stadium, Nelspruit
Attendance: 7,500
Referee: Daniel Bennett (South Africa)

=== 2015 Africa Cup of Nations ===
At the first match, Tunisia opened the scoring in the 70th minute, as Ali Maâloul's cross was converted by Mohamed Ali Manser at the far post. Cape Verde equalized eight minutes later through Héldon's penalty after he was brought down by Syam Ben Youssef at the edge of the penalty area. In second game, Zambia took the lead in the 60th minute, when Emmanuel Mayuka scored home from Rainford Kalaba's lofted pass. Tunisia equalized ten minutes later after Syam Ben Youssef flicked a corner to Ahmed Akaïchi to score from close range. They completed the comeback in the 89th minute, as Yassine Chikhaoui headed in Youssef Msakni's cross. Against DR Congo, Tunisia took the lead in the 31st minute, as Yassine Chikhaoui's shot was deflected and Ahmed Akaïchi headed the ball in. DR Congo equalized in the 66th minute, after Dieumerci Mbokani headed down a long ball for Jeremy Bokila to score. The result was enough for Tunisia to win the group, while DR Congo also qualified as runners-up, ahead of Cape Verde on goals scored. In quarter-final, Tunisia took the lead in the 70th minute, when Ahmed Akaïchi flicked in Hamza Mathlouthi's cross from the right. Equatorial Guinea scored the equalizer in the third minute of injury time through Javier Balboa's penalty, which was awarded after Hamza Mathlouthi was ruled to have fouled Iván Bolado. The match went to extra time, and Balboa scored the winning goal in the 102nd minute with a direct free kick, sending the hosts to their first ever semi-finals. The match had witnessed controversies regarding the Mauritian referee's bias refereeing in favor to the host nation, including the controversial penalty in the final minutes, resulting with Tunisian players attacking him in the end of the game. CAF decided to ban the referee for life as for the result.

==== Group stage ====
Pos	Team	Pld	W	D	L	GF	GA	GD	Pts	Qualification
1	Tunisia	3	1	2	0	4	3	+1	5	Advance to knockout stage
2	DR Congo	3	0	3	0	2	2	0	3	Advance to knockout stage
3	Cape Verde	3	0	3	0	1	1	0	3	
4	Zambia	3	0	2	1	2	3	−1	2	

Source: CAF
18 January 2015
20:00

Tunisia	1–1	Cape Verde
Manser 70'	Report	Héldon 78' (pen.)

Estadio de Ebibeyin, Ebibeyin
Attendance: 7,479
Referee: Eric Otogo-Castane (Gabon)

22 January 2015
17:00

Zambia	1–2	Tunisia
Mayuka 60'	Report	Akaïchi 70'; Chikhaoui 89'

Estadio de Ebibeyin, Ebibeyin
Attendance: 8,000
Referee: Aboubacar Mario Bangoura (Guinea)

26 January 2015
19:00

DR Congo	1–1	Tunisia
Bokila 66'	Report	Akaïchi 31'

Estadio de Bata, Bata
Attendance: 11,463
Referee: Bakary Gassama (Gambia)

==== Quarter-finals ====
31 January 2015
20:30

Tunisia	1–2 (a.e.t.)	Equatorial Guinea
Akaïchi 70'	Report	Balboa 90+3' (pen.), 102'

Estadio de Bata, Bata
Attendance: 41,000
Referee: Rajindraparsad Seechurn (Mauritius)

=== 2017 Africa Cup of Nations ===
==== Group stage ====
Pos	Team	Pld	W	D	L	GF	GA	GD	Pts	Qualification
1	Senegal	3	2	1	0	6	2	+4	7	Advance to knockout stage
2	Tunisia	3	2	0	1	6	5	+1	6	Advance to knockout stage
3	Algeria	3	0	2	1	5	6	−1	2	
4	Zimbabwe	3	0	1	2	4	8	−4	1	

Source: CAF
15 January 2017
20:00

Tunisia	0–2	Senegal
	Report	Mané 10' (pen.); Mbodji 30'

Stade de Franceville, Franceville
Referee: Sidi Alioum (Cameroon)

19 January 2017
17:00

Algeria	1–2	Tunisia
Hanni 90+2'	Report	Mandi 50' (o.g.); Sliti 66' (pen.)

Stade de Franceville, Franceville
Referee: Bernard Camille (Seychelles)

23 January 2017
20:00

Zimbabwe	2–4	Tunisia
Musona 42'; Ndoro 58'	Report	Sliti 9'; Msakni 22'; Khenissi 36'; Khazri 45' (pen.)

Stade de l'Amitié, Libreville
Referee: Denis Dembélé (Ivory Coast)

==== Quarter-finals ====
28 January 2017
17:00

Burkina Faso	2–0	Tunisia
Bancé 81'; Nakoulma 85'	Report

Stade de l'Amitié, Libreville
Referee: Daniel Bennett (South Africa)

=== 2019 Africa Cup of Nations ===
The start of the competition was poor after three draws in the group stage against Angola, Mali, and Mauritania to qualify for the Round 16 with great difficulty in second place. In the next round, the results improved by beating Ghana, and Madagascar 3–0 to qualify for the semi-finals for the first time in 15 years when Tunisia won the AFCON in 2004 before they narrowly lost to Senegal 1–0 in extra time after a referee dispute of Bamlak Tessema because of not giving a clear penalty to Tunisia 4 minutes before the end of the game to complete the competition in fourth place behind Nigeria. Nonetheless, it stands as the best performance of Tunisia since winning 2004 AFCON at home.

==== Group stage ====
Pos	Team	Pld	W	D	L	GF	GA	GD	Pts	Qualification
1	Mali	3	2	1	0	6	2	+4	7	Advance to knockout stage
2	Tunisia	3	0	3	0	2	2	0	3	Advance to knockout stage
3	Angola	3	0	2	1	1	2	−1	2	
4	Mauritania	3	0	2	1	1	4	−3	2	

Source: CAF
24 June 2019
19:00

Tunisia	1–1	Angola
Msakni 34' (pen.)	Report	Djalma 73'

Suez Stadium, Suez
Attendance: 7,345
Referee: Bamlak Tessema Weyesa (Ethiopia)

28 June 2019
16:30

Tunisia	1–1	Mali
Khazri 70'	Report	Samassékou 60'

Suez Stadium, Suez
Attendance: 16,085
Referee: Joshua Bondo (Botswana)

2 July 2019
21:00

Mauritania	0–0	Tunisia
	Report

Suez Stadium, Suez
Attendance: 7,732
Referee: Louis Hakizimana (Rwanda)

==== Round of 16 ====
8 July 2019
21:00

Ghana	1–1 (a.e.t.)	Tunisia
Bedoui 90+2' (o.g.)	Report	Khenissi 73'
Penalties
Wakaso (penalty scored); J. Ayew (penalty scored); Ekuban (penalty missed); Agbenyenu (penalty scored); Partey (penalty scored)	4–5	(penalty scored) Sliti; (penalty scored) Khazri; (penalty scored) Bronn; (penalty scored) Meriah; (penalty scored) Sassi

Ismailia Stadium, Ismailia
Attendance: 8,890
Referee: Victor Gomes (South Africa)

==== Quarter-finals ====
11 July 2019
21:00

Madagascar	0–3	Tunisia
	Report	Sassi 52'; Msakni 60'; Sliti 90+3'

Al Salam Stadium, Cairo
Attendance: 7,568
Referee: Sidi Alioum (Cameroon)

==== Semi-finals ====
14 July 2019
18:00

Senegal	1–0 (a.e.t.)	Tunisia
Bronn 101' (o.g.)	Report

30 June Stadium, Cairo
Attendance: 9,143
Referee: Bamlak Tessema Weyesa (Ethiopia)

==== Third place match ====
17 July 2019
21:00

Tunisia	0–1	Nigeria
	Report	Ighalo 3'

Al Salam Stadium, Cairo
Attendance: 6,340
Referee: Gehad Grisha (Egypt)

=== 2021 Africa Cup of Nations ===
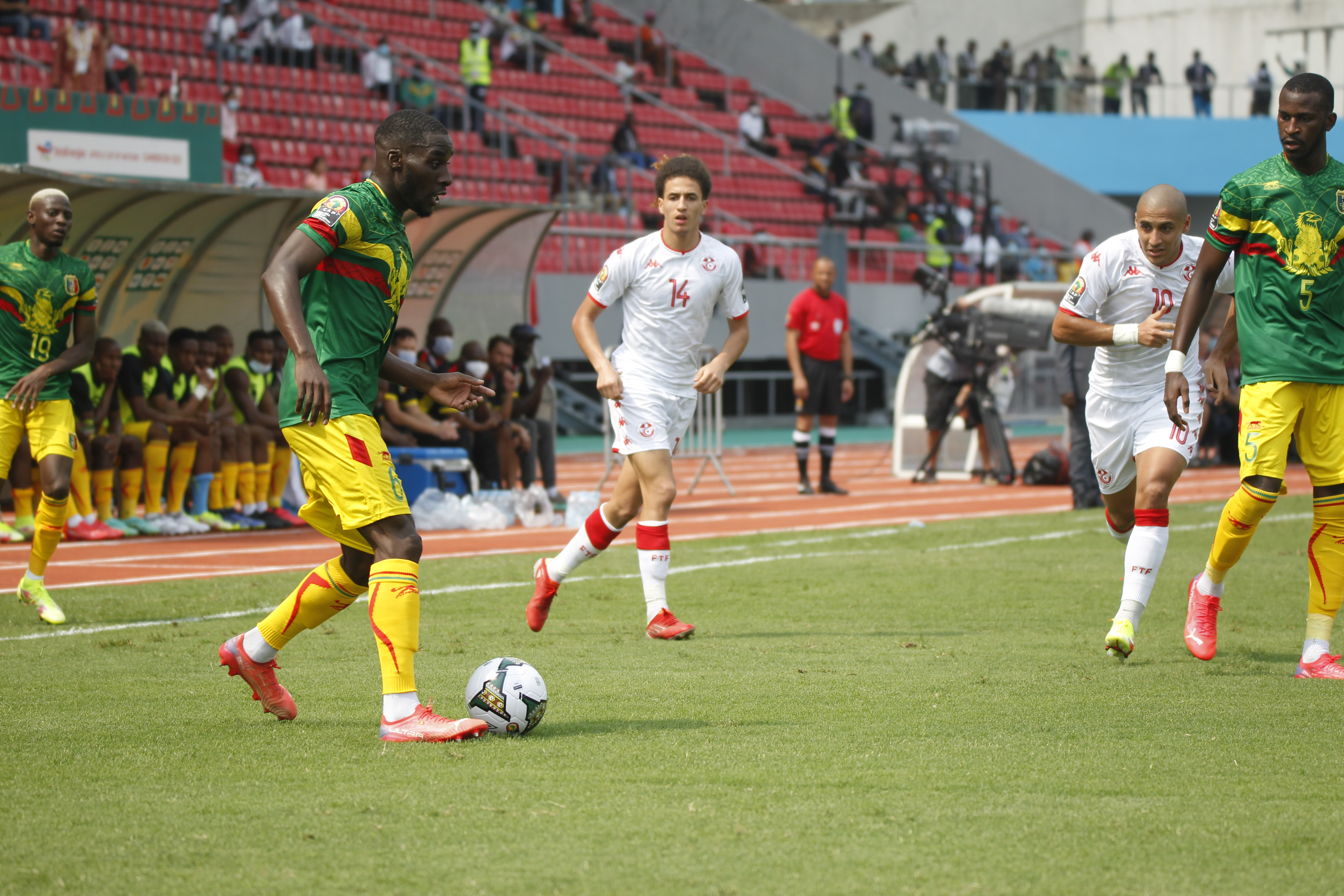
Tunisia against Mali at the 2021 Africa Cup of Nations in Cameroon

The team's participation in the 2021 Africa Cup of Nations was rather bad. In the group stage, it began with a 0–1 defeat from Mali during the match, which witnessed strange refereeing events, as Zambian referee Janny Sikazwe ended the match in the 85th minute. In the second match, the team achieved a moral victory over Mauritania 4–0 thanks to the double of Wahbi Khazri and the goals of Hamza Mathlouthi and Seifeddine Jaziri, but the team was afflicted by a 0–1 defeat against Gambia in the last moments of the match, to qualify for the round of 16 as the best third in the group stage. Nevertheless, the team defeated strong Nigeria 1–0 with the goal of Youssef Msakni from outside the penalty area, despite the absence of Mondher Kebaier from the match due to his infection with the COVID-19 virus, and he was replaced by his assistant Jalel Kadri. In the end, the team was eliminated from the quarter–finals against Burkina Faso after a 0–1 defeat.

==== Group stage ====
Pos	Team	Pld	W	D	L	GF	GA	GD	Pts	Qualification
1	Mali	3	2	1	0	4	1	+3	7	Advance to knockout stage
2	Gambia	3	2	1	0	3	1	+2	7	Advance to knockout stage
3	Tunisia	3	1	0	2	4	2	+2	3	Advance to knockout stage
4	Mauritania	3	0	0	3	0	7	−7	0	

Source: CAF
12 January 2022
14:00

Tunisia	0–1	Mali
	Report	Koné 48' (pen.)

Limbe Stadium, Limbe
Referee: Janny Sikazwe (Zambia)

16 January 2022
17:00

Tunisia	4–0	Mauritania
Mathlouthi 4'; Khazri 9', 64'; Jaziri 66'	Report

Limbe Stadium, Limbe
Referee: Mahmoud El Banna (Egypt)

20 January 2022
20:00

Gambia	1–0	Tunisia
A. Jallow 90+3'	Report

Limbe Stadium, Limbe
Referee: Fernando Guerrero (Mexico)

==== Round of 16 ====
23 January 2022
20:00

Nigeria	0–1	Tunisia
	Report	Msakni 47'

Roumdé Adjia Stadium, Garoua
Referee: Maguette N'Diaye (Senegal)

==== Quarter-finals ====
29 January 2022
20:00

Burkina Faso	1–0	Tunisia
Da. Ouattara 45+3'	Report

Roumdé Adjia Stadium, Garoua
Referee: Joshua Bondo (Botswana)

=== 2023 Africa Cup of Nations ===
Tunisia drawn for the 2023 Africa Cup of Nations alongside Mali, Namibia and South Africa. In the first match, they tried in vain to overcome the constant pressure of Namibia, the match being decided two minutes from regulation time, the Namibians secured a victory when Deon Hotto scored a goal against Bechir Ben Saïd. Against Mali, the Tunisians fell behind after a goal by Lassine Sinayoko on a pass from Kamory Doumbia. Just ten minutes after Mali had opened the scoring, Ali Abdi produced a point and a back pass for Hamza Rafia to equalise 1–1, which proved to be the final score of the match. In the last match against South Africa, Tunisia were too timid while South Africa were too reluctant to make convincing efforts despite holding the advantage. However, as the match became increasingly difficult, the Tunisians almost fell into the traps of the South African counter-attack, including a missed effort from Sphephelo Sithole. Despite a goal attempt from Haythem Jouini, the match ended goalless, eliminating Tunisia from the group stage for the first time since the 2013 edition.

==== Group stage ====
Pos	Team	Pld	W	D	L	GF	GA	GD	Pts	Qualification
1	Mali	3	1	2	0	3	1	+2	5	Advance to knockout stage
2	South Africa	3	1	1	1	4	2	+2	4 (Note: Head-to-head points: South Africa 3, Namibia 0.)	Advance to knockout stage
3	Namibia	3	1	1	1	1	4	−3	4	Advance to knockout stage
4	Tunisia	3	0	2	1	1	2	−1	2	

Source: CAF
Notes:
16 January 2024
17:00

Tunisia	0–1	Namibia
	Report	Hotto 88'

Amadou Gon Coulibaly Stadium, Korhogo
Attendance: 13,991
Referee: Omar Artan (Somalia)

20 January 2024
20:00

Tunisia	1–1	Mali
Rafia 20'	Report	Sinayoko 10'

Amadou Gon Coulibaly Stadium, Korhogo
Attendance: 18,130
Referee: Daniel Nii Laryea (Ghana)

24 January 2024
17:00

South Africa	0–0	Tunisia
	Report

Amadou Gon Coulibaly Stadium, Korhogo
Attendance: 12,847
Referee: Issa Sy (Senegal)

=== 2025 Africa Cup of Nations ===
Tunisia qualified for the 2025 Africa Cup of Nations and entered the competition under the leadership of coach Sami Trabelsi, who is leading the team in the Africa Cup of Nations for the third time after 2012 and 2013. In their opening group match, Tunisia began their campaign with a victory against Uganda at the Rabat Olympic Stadium. Ellyes Skhiri opened the scoring in the 10th minute with a header from a Hannibal Mejbri corner, this is Tunisia's 100th goal in the Africa Cup of Nations. Half an hour later, Elias Achouri doubled the lead in the 40th minute with a powerful shot after a pass from Ali Abdi. Achouri scored his second goal, Tunisia's third, in the 64th minute, while Denis Omedi scored Uganda's only goal in the final seconds of the match, making the final score 3−1. Tunisia won their first Africa Cup of Nations match for the first time since 2013.

In their second match against Nigeria, at the Fez Stadium, the Tunisian team appeared lethargic and delivered a disappointing performance. Nigeria opened the scoring at the end of the first half with a header from Victor Osimhen, from an Ademola Lookman cross. Five minutes into the second half, the Nigerians doubled their lead with another header, this time from Wilfred Ndidi, following a Lookman corner. Tunisia's difficulties continued when their opponents scored a third goal on a lightning counter-attack. The ball reached Osimhen, who passed it to Lookman. Lookman skillfully beat the Tunisian defense before finishing, giving Nigeria a 3–0 lead. In the 74th minute, Majbri took a low, angled free kick which Montassar Talbi headed home to score the first goal. Eight minutes later, Malian referee Boubou Traoré awarded Tunisia a penalty after Nigerian defender Bright Osayi-Samuel handled the ball in the penalty area, allowing Ali Abdi to score Tunisia's second goal. In stoppage time, Sebastian Tounekti delivered a cross that Ferjani Sassi almost converted into an equalizer, but his header went wide and the team failed to equalize. The match ended in a 3–2 defeat.

The third match against Tanzania, at the Rabat Olympic Stadium, was Tunisia's first game against Tanzania in the Africa Cup of Nations. The Congolese referee Jean-Jacques Ndala awarded Tunisia a penalty after a Tanzanian defender Ibrahim Hamad fouled Hazem Mastouri in the penalty area. Ismaël Gharbi converted the penalty in the 43rd minute. Three minutes into the second half, goalkeeper Aymen Dahmen misplaced a pass back to his defense, allowing the Tanzanian attack to intercept the ball. Novatus Miroshi passed to Feisal Salum, who, with a long-range shot, beat the Tunisian goalkeeper and equalized. The match ended in a 1–1 draw, and Tunisia qualified for the round of 16 after finishing second in their group. After his good performance in the match, Gharbi was also named Man of the Match.

"We dream a great deal, but we do not work enough. We need to ask ourselves some questions, because the truth is that we are lagging behind!"

— Hannibal Mejbri’s statement following the elimination in the Round of 16 against Mali.

The round of 16 match against Mali was very violent, with Malian defender Woyo Coulibaly being sent off in the 26th minute. With no shots on target, the first half ended goalless. The second half continued in the same vein until the 88th minute, when Elias Saad delivered a lobbed cross that Firas Chaouat headed home to score the opening goal. However, Tunisia's joy was short-lived, as South African referee Abongile Tom awarded Mali a penalty after Yassine Meriah handled the ball in the box. Lassine Sinayoko converted the penalty to equalize in the 96th minute, sending the game into extra time. The Tunisians largely controlled extra time until the 106th minute, when Chaouat scored a goal that was disallowed for offside. The match, however, ended in a draw 1−1, forcing a penalty shootout which went in favor of the Malians after their players missed three penalties, thus eliminating the team from the round of 16. On 4 January 2026, the federation announced the termination of Sami Trabelsi's contract and the dismissal of all technical staff.

==== Group stage ====
Pos	Team	Pld	W	D	L	GF	GA	GD	Pts	Qualification
1	Nigeria	3	3	0	0	8	4	+4	9	Advance to knockout stage
2	Tunisia	3	1	1	1	6	5	+1	4	Advance to knockout stage
3	Tanzania	3	0	2	1	3	4	−1	2	Advance to knockout stage
4	Uganda	3	0	1	2	3	7	−4	1	

Source: CAF
23 December 2025
21:00

Tunisia	3–1	Uganda
Skhiri 10'; Achouri 40', 64'	Report	Omedi 90+2'

Rabat Olympic Stadium, Rabat
Attendance: 13,387
Referee: Patrice Mebiame (Gabon)

27 December 2025
21:00

Nigeria	3–2	Tunisia
Osimhen 44'; Ndidi 50'; Lookman 67'	Report	Talbi 74'; Abdi 87' (pen.)

Fez Stadium, Fez
Attendance: 25,544
Referee: Boubou Traore (Mali)

30 December 2025
17:00

Tanzania	1–1	Tunisia
Salum 48'	Report	Gharbi 43' (pen.)

Rabat Olympic Stadium, Rabat
Attendance: 15,205
Referee: Jean-Jacques Ndala (DR Congo)

==== Round of 16 ====
3 January 2026
20:00

Mali	1–1 (a.e.t.)	Tunisia
Sinayoko 90+6' (pen.)	Report	Chaouat 88'
Penalties
Bissouma (penalty missed); Sinayoko (penalty scored); Dorgeles (penalty missed); Diakité (penalty scored); Touré (penalty scored)	3–2	(penalty scored) Meriah; (penalty missed) Abdi; (penalty scored) Saad; (penalty missed) Achouri; (penalty missed) Ben Romdhane

Mohammed V Stadium, Casablanca
Attendance: 41,982
Referee: Abongile Tom (South Africa)

== Statistics ==
=== Head to head ===
- – Positive balance
- – Neutral balance
- – Negative balance

Versus	Pld	W	D	L	GF	GA	Def	First match date	Last match date
Algeria	2	2	0	0	3	1	+2	22 January 2013	19 January 2017
Angola	2	0	2	0	2	2	0	31 January 2008	24 June 2019
Burkina Faso	3	0	1	2	1	4	–3	21 February 1998	29 January 2022
Cameroon	4	0	2	2	5	9	–4	5 March 1982	21 January 2010
Cape Verde	1	0	1	0	1	1	0	18 January 2015	18 January 2015
Congo	2	1	1	0	1	0	+1	11 March 1978	3 February 2000
DR Congo (Note: Includes matches against Zaire)	4	2	2	0	7	3	+3	30 March 1994	26 January 2015
Egypt	2	1	0	1	1	1	0	7 February 2000	25 January 2002
Ethiopia	3	1	0	2	8	8	0	14 January 1962	12 November 1965
Equatorial Guinea	1	0	0	1	1	2	–1	31 January 2015	31 January 2015
Gabon	3	0	2	1	3	4	–1	28 January 1996	27 January 2012
Gambia	1	0	0	1	0	1	–1	20 January 2022	20 January 2022
Ghana	8	0	3	5	5	8	–3	24 November 1963	8 July 2019
Guinea	2	0	1	1	1	4	–3	1 February 2004	30 January 2006
Ivory Coast	2	1	0	1	3	4	–1	25 January 1996	26 January 2013
Libya	1	0	0	1	0	2	–2	9 March 1982	9 March 1982
Madagascar	1	1	0	0	3	0	+3	11 July 2019	11 July 2019
Mali	6	0	4	2	3	6	–3	26 March 1994	3 January 2026
Mauritania	2	1	1	0	4	0	+4	2 July 2019	16 January 2022
Morocco	4	2	2	0	5	3	+2	6 March 1978	23 January 2012
Mozambique	1	0	1	0	1	1	0	16 January 1996	16 January 1996
Namibia	1	0	0	1	0	1	–1	16 January 2024	16 January 2024
Niger	1	1	0	0	2	1	+1	27 January 2012	27 January 2012
Nigeria	7	1	2	4	6	12	–6	16 March 1978	27 December 2025
Rwanda	1	1	0	0	2	1	+1	24 January 2004	24 January 2004
Senegal	6	1	3	2	3	5	–2	14 November 1965	14 July 2019
South Africa	5	2	2	1	7	5	+2	3 February 1996	24 January 2024
Tanzania	1	0	1	0	1	1	0	30 December 2025	30 December 2025
Togo	2	1	1	0	4	2	+2	16 February 1998	30 January 2013
Uganda	3	3	0	0	9	2	+7	20 January 1962	23 December 2025
Zambia	5	3	2	0	11	3	+8	31 January 1996	22 January 2015
Zimbabwe	1	1	0	0	4	1	+3	23 January 2017	23 January 2017
Total	87	26	32	29	106	103	+3	14 January 1962	3 January 2026

=== Goalscorers ===
Rank	Player	1962	1963	1965	1978	1982	1994	1996	1998	2000	2002	2004	2006	2008	2010	2012	2013	2015	2017	2019	2021	2023	2025	Goals
1	Francileudo Santos											4	4	2										10
2	Youssef Msakni														–	2	1	–	1	2	1	–		7
3	Mohamed Salah Jedidi	1	2	1																				4
3	Wahbi Khazri																–	–	1	1	2			4
4	Ahmed Akaïchi														–			3	–					3
4	Naïm Sliti																		2	1	–	–	–	3
4	Adel Sellimi						–	2	–	1														3
4	Imed Ben Younes							3																3
5	Zoubeir Baya							2	–	–	–													2
5	Abdelmajid Chetali	–	1	1																				2
5	Tahar Chaïbi			2																				2
5	Abderraouf Ben Aziza				2																			2
5	Mehdi Ben Slimane							–	2															2
5	Ziad Tlemçani						–		2															2
5	Hassen Gabsi								2	–	–													2
5	Ali Zitouni									2														2
5	Ziad Jaziri									–		2	–											2
5	Khaled Badra							–	–	1	–	1												2
5	Taha Yassine Khenissi																		1	1		–		2
5	Yassine Chikhaoui													1		–		1						2
5	Issam Jemâa												–	1	–	1	–							2
5	Chaouki Ben Saada												–	2	–									2
5	Selim Benachour										–	1	1											2
5	Elias Achouri																					–	2	2
6	Moncef Cherif	1																						1
6	Ammar Merrichkou	1	–																					1
6	Chedly Laaouini	1		–																				1
6	Rached Meddab	1																						1
6	Mongi Delhoum			1																				1
6	Abdelwahab Lahmar			1																				1
6	Ali Kaabi				1	–																		1
6	Mohsen Labidi				1																			1
6	Kamel Gabsi					1																		1
6	Riadh Bouazizi							–	–	–	–	–	1											1
6	Faouzi Rouissi						1	–																1
6	Kaies Ghodhbane							1		–	–	–	–											1
6	Hédi Berkhissa							1																1
6	Abdelkader Ben Hassen							1																1
6	Radhi Jaïdi									1	–	–	–	–										1
6	Walid Azaiez									1	–													1
6	Karim Haggui											–	1	–	–	–								1
6	Mejdi Traoui													1	–	–	–							1
6	Jawhar Mnari											1	–	–										1
6	Najeh Braham											1												1
6	Ferjani Sassi																	–	–	1				1
6	Mohamed Ali Moncer																	1						1
6	Khaled Mouelhi																1							1
6	Saber Khalifa															1	–		–					1
6	Khaled Korbi														–	1								1
6	Amine Chermiti													–	1	–		–						1
6	Zouheir Dhaouadi														1	–	–							1
6	Hamza Mathlouthi																	–	–		1			1
6	Seifeddine Jaziri																				1	–	–	1
6	Hamza Rafia																				–	1		1
6	Ellyes Skhiri																			–	–	–	1	1
6	Montassar Talbi																				–	–	1	1
6	Ali Abdi																				–	–	1	1
6	Ismaël Gharbi																						1	1
6	Firas Chaouat																			–			1	1
1 (o.g.)	(Cameroon) Aurélien Chedjou														1									1
1 (o.g.)	(Algeria) Aïssa Mandi																		1					1
Total		5	3	6	4	1	1	10	6	6	0	10	7	7	3*	5	2	5	6*	6	5	1	7	106

– Best goalscorer(s) of the tournament
– Best goalscorer(s) of the team
* – Own goal

Hat-tricks

Player	Time of goals	Result	Against	Tournament	Round	Date
Francileudo Santos	35', 82', 90+3'	4–1	Zambia	2006	Group stage	22 January 2006

== Awards ==
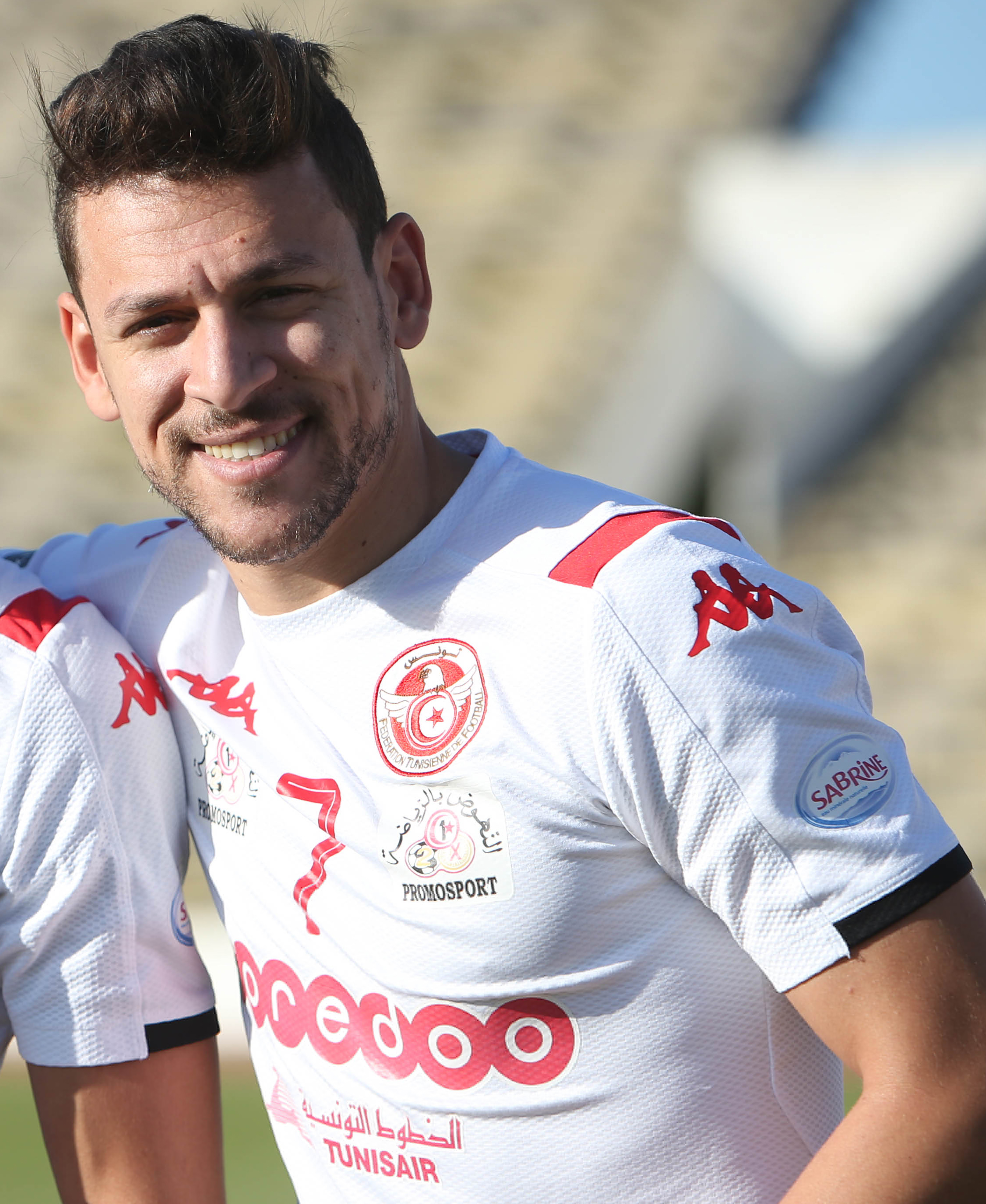
Youssef Msakni won the Goal of the tournament award in 2013, was included in the Best XI in 2012 and was named Man of the Match three times in different editions.

Top scorer

- 2004: Francileudo Santos (4 goals)
- 2015: Ahmed Akaïchi (3 goals)

Team of the tournament

- 1978: Mokhtar Dhouib
- 1996: Chokri El Ouaer, Zoubeir Baya
- 1998: Hassen Gabsi
- 2000: Khaled Badra
- 2004: Khaled Badra, Riadh Bouazizi
- 2008: Saber Ben Frej
- 2012: Youssef Msakni
- 2019: Yassine Meriah

Man of the match

- 2013: Youssef Msakni (vs. Algeria; Group D)
- 2017: Youssef Msakni (vs. Algeria; Group B)
- 2017: Taha Yassine Khenissi (vs. Zimbabwe; Group B)
- 2019: Wahbi Khazri (vs. Angola; Group E)
- 2019: Ferjani Sassi (vs. Madagascar; Quarter-final)
- 2021: Wahbi Khazri (vs. Mauritania; Group F)
- 2021: Youssef Msakni (vs. Nigeria; Round of 16)
- 2025: Elias Achouri (vs. Uganda; Group C)
- 2025: Ismaël Gharbi (vs. Tanzania; Group C)

Goal of the tournament

- 2013: Youssef Msakni (vs. Algeria; Group D)

== Controversies ==
Tunisia vs. Equatorial Guinea refereeing at 2015 Afcon

Wadie Jary, the president of the Tunisian Football Federation, claimed that there was a bias against Tunisia following their controversial quarter-final defeat to Equatorial Guinea on 31 January 2015. He was banned from CAF competitions and activities. Rajindraparsad Seechurn, the Mauritian referee who gave a penalty to Equatorial Guinea in that match, was banned from officiating for six months and removed from CAF's elite register of referees. The Tunisian FA was fined $50,000 for confronting the referee during the match, in addition to damage to changing room facilities, while Equatorial Guinea was fined $5,000 for inadequate security at the stadium.

Tunisia vs. Mali refereeing at 2021 Afcon

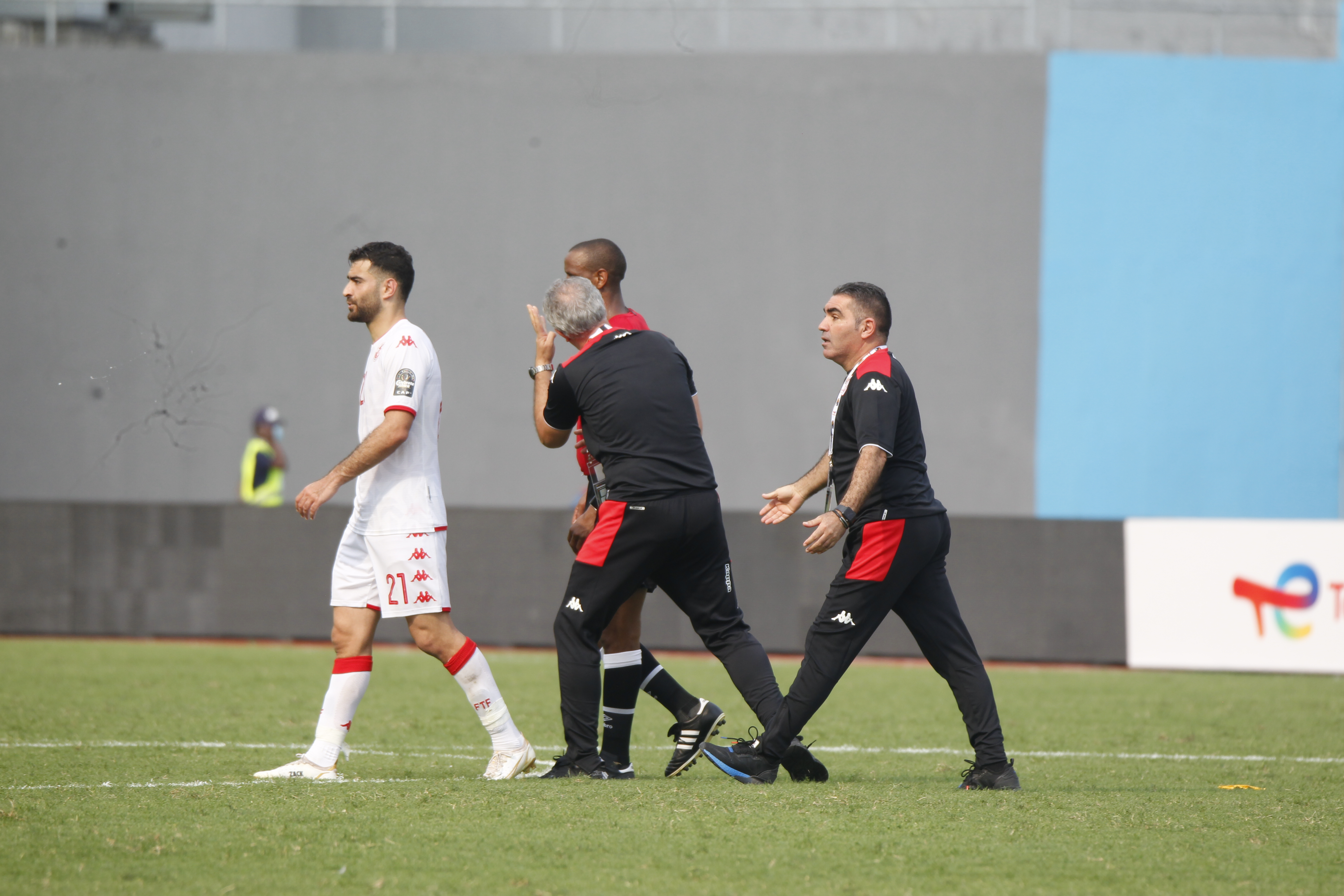
Mondher Kebaier and Jalel Kadri protesting against referee Janny Sikazwe after the controversy during the match against Mali at 2021 Africa Cup of Nations

The match between Tunisia and Mali, the first meeting of Group F, was not played to completion. Zambian referee Janny Sikazwe initially whistled the end of the match in the 86th minute before changing his mind, warned by his assistant referee and the protests of the Tunisian players. He then signaled the end of the game in the 90th minute, seconds from the end of regulation time, just as the assistant referee was about to announce added time. In front of the furious Tunisians, the refereeing quartet had to leave the field under police escort.

Given the extent of the controversy, the resumption of the match, to play the remaining additional time, was announced. However, the Tunisian team refused to resume the match, claiming that the players were already in the showers, or out of the stadium, therefore unfit to resume the game. The Malians having presented themselves on the lawn, the end of the match is whistled with only one team on the ground, the result of 1–0 being ratified later by CAF.

Later, it was reported by different media that the referee Janny Sikazwe had in fact suffered a sunstroke in the middle of the game, so much so that he was even taken to the hospital, from where the presence of the fourth referee on the pitch at the time of the attempt to restart the match. According to the Tunisian player Wahbi Khazri, the referee of the match "was no longer coherent", "the referee lost the thread of the match" specified the Tunisian captain. "He was no longer consistent in his choices and decisions. He was very hot."

== See also ==
- Tunisia at the FIFA World Cup
- Tunisia at the FIFA Confederations Cup
- Tunisia at the African Nations Championship
- Tunisia at the FIFA Arab Cup
