= 1996 African Cup of Nations final =

- Event: 1996 African Cup of Nations
South Africa	Tunisia
(South Africa)	(Tunisia)
2	0
- Date: 3 February 1996
- Venue: FNB Stadium, Johannesburg
- Referee: Charles Massembe (Uganda)
- Attendance: 80,000

The 1996 African Cup of Nations final was a football match that took place on 3 February 1996 at the FNB Stadium in Johannesburg, South Africa, to determine the winner of the 1996 African Cup of Nations, the football championship of Africa organized by the Confederation of African Football (CAF).

Host nation South Africa won their first title, defeating Tunisia 2–0. The match was attended by both then-president Nelson Mandela, deputy president F. W. de Klerk and by then Sport Minister Steve Tshwete, and Bafana Bafana were congratulated by them, lifting the trophy in front of the multiracial home crowd.

== Route to the final ==
South Africa
Round
Tunisia
Opponent
Result
Group stage
Opponent
Result
Cameroon
3–0
Match 1
Mozambique
1–1
Angola
1–0
Match 2
Ghana
1–2
Egypt
0–1
Match 3
Ivory Coast
3–1

Team	Pld	W	D	L	GF	GA	GD	Pts
South Africa	3	2	0	1	4	1	+3	6
Egypt	3	2	0	1	4	3	+1	6
Cameroon	3	1	1	1	5	7	−2	4
Angola	3	0	1	2	4	6	−2	1

Final standings

Team	Pld	W	D	L	GF	GA	GD	Pts
Ghana	3	3	0	0	6	1	+5	9
Tunisia	3	1	1	1	5	4	+1	4
Ivory Coast	3	1	0	2	2	5	−3	3
Mozambique	3	0	1	2	1	4	−3	1

Opponent
Result
Knockout stage
Opponent
Result
Algeria
2–1
Quarter-finals
Gabon
1–1 (a.e.t.) (4–1 p)
Ghana
3–0
Semi-finals
Zambia
4–2

== Match details ==
3 February 1996
16:30 SAST (UTC+2)

South Africa	2–0	Tunisia
Williams 73', 75'	Report 1 Report 2

FNB Stadium, Johannesburg
Attendance: 80,000
Referee: Charles Masembe (Uganda)

South Africa	Tunisia

GK	1	Andre Arendse
CB	5	Mark Fish
CB	4	Lucas Radebe
CB	9	Neil Tovey (c)
RM	2	Sizwe Motaung
CM	8	Linda Buthelezi	(yellow card) 29'	(substituted off) 51'
CM	21	Eric Tinkler
LM	17	Shaun Bartlett
AM	15	Doctor Khumalo
AM	10	John Moshoeu
CF	6	Phil Masinga		(substituted off) 65'
Substitutions:
MF	19	Helman Mkhalele		(substituted on) 51'
FW	11	Mark Williams		(substituted on) 65'
Manager:
Clive Barker

GK	1	Chokri El Ouaer (c)
RB	14	Sabri Jaballah	(yellow card) 22'
CB	6	Ferid Chouchane
CB	4	Mounir Boukadida
LB	5	Hédi Berkhissa
DM	20	Riadh Bouazizi		(substituted off) 77'
CM	12	Sofiane Fekih
CM	10	Kaies Ghodhbane		(substituted off) 46'
RF	18	Mehdi Ben Slimane
CF	11	Adel Sellimi
LF	8	Zoubeir Baya
Substitutions:
DF	21	Lassad Hanini	(yellow card) 67'	(substituted on) 46'
FW	9	Abdelkader Ben Hassen		(substituted on) 77'
Manager:
(Poland) Henryk Kasperczak
