= Fekih =

Fekih is a North African surname. Notable people with the surname include:

- Afef Fekih, Tunisian and American control theorist and professor
- Mongi Fekih, Tunisian politician, governor of the Kairouan Governorate
- Mounir Fekih (born 1993), Algerian footballer
- Sofiane Fekih (born 1969), Tunisian footballer
