= Adel Sellimi =

Tunisian former footballer and manager

Personal information
- Date of birth: 16 November 1972 (age 53)
- Place of birth: Tunis, Tunisia
- Height: 1.80 m (5 ft 11 in)
- Position: Striker

Youth career
- 1982–1990: Club Africain

Senior career*
Years	Team	Apps	(Gls)
1990–1996	Club Africain	144	(61)
1996–1998	Nantes	40	(2)
1998	Real Jaén	11	(3)
1999–2002	Freiburg	108	(27)
2002–2003	Club Africain	51	(29)
Total		391	(151)

International career^{‡}
1992–2002	Tunisia	80	(20)

Managerial career
- 2010: Club Africain (assistant)
- 2010–2011: AS Gabès
- 2012–2013: Tunisia (assistant)
- 2013–2014: AS Marsa
- 2018: Al-Markhiya SC
- 2018: Al-Khor SC
- 2019–2021: Tunisia (assistant)
- 2022: Club Africain
- * Club domestic league appearances and goals as of 6 February 2008 (UTC) ‡ National team caps and goals as of 22 April 2007

Adel Sellimi (Arabic: عَادِل السَّلِيمِيّ; born 16 November 1972) is a Tunisian former football striker and a current manager.

== Career ==
Sellimi reportedly drew inspiration from the 1978 World Cup team who became the first African nation to win a World Cup match. He joined his first club at the age of 10, Club African of Tunis, and he stayed there for the next 14 years, picking up two Tunisian league titles and one Tunisia Cup along the way.

Sellimi earned his first cap in September 1993 in a friendly against Germany.

His performances during the 1996 African Cup of Nations finals in South Africa in which Tunisia reached the final, helped increase his profile there. Sellimi scored in the semi-final against Zambia.

Following a good overall appearance at the 1996 Olympic Games in Atlanta, Sellimi was signed by French Ligue 1 club FC Nantes Atlantium, However, his relocation to France marked the beginning of what was considered a 'dry spell.' Despite being christened "The Lung" by Nantes fans due to the distance he covered during matches, some thought that he didn't seem to settle in at his new team. In his debut season, he scored two goals in 30 games and failed to replicate the goal-scoring he had at home in Tunisia. Sellimi departed Nantes for Real Jaén in the Spanish second division (then known as LaLiga 2) in 1998. He regained his earlier form as he scored 32 goals in 48 games for Real Jaén.

2. Bundesliga side Freiburg brought Sellimi in 1999 and partnered him with other Tunisian internationals, anchorman Zoubeir Baya and fellow striker Mehdi Benslimane. He took a while to find his earlier form, and many fans at Freiburg considered him a mistaken purchase during his first year. He gained promotion with Freiburg to the Bundesliga in 2000. He regained some of his goal-scoring prowess and headed the Bundesliga goal scoring list going into the winter break of 2000/01.

A not-as-expected 2001 led to Sellimi missing out on the 2002 African Cup of Nations in Mali and several international friendlies after a fall-out with former national coach Henri Michel, but the Frenchman's replacement with Ammar Souayah coupled with the national team's so-called 'goal drought' brought about Sellimi's recall in hopes of him contributing more goals too the national team. The 2002 World Cup in Korea and Japan turned out to be in what some would say as Adel Sellimi's 'swansong' in premier football competitions, and he retired from international football shortly after the tournament at the age of 31. He returned to Club Africain shortly afterwards.

After retiring, Sellimi became a manager, working for several clubs in Tunisia and Qatar.

== International goals ==
Scores and results list Tunisia's goal tally first, the score column indicates score after each Sellimi goal.

List of international goals scored by Adel Sellimi
No.	Date	Venue	Opponent	Score	Result	Competition
1	11 October 1992	Stade El Menzah, Tunis, Tunisia	Benin	5–1	5–1	1994 FIFA World Cup qualification (CAF)
2	20 August 1993	Stade Tourbillon, Sion, Switzerland	Switzerland	1–0	1–2	Friendly
3	26 July 1994	Stade El Menzah, Tunis, Tunisia	Tanzania	1–0	2–0	Friendly
4	26 July 1994	Stade El Menzah, Tunis, Tunisia	Tanzania	2–0	2–0	Friendly
5	15 July 1995	Stade El Menzah, Tunis, Tunisia	Senegal	3–0	4–0	1996 African Cup of Nations qualification
6	31 January 1996	Kings Park Stadium, Durban, South Africa	Zambia	1–0	4–2	1996 African Cup of Nations
7	31 January 1996	Kings Park Stadium, Durban, South Africa	Zambia	4–1	4–2	1996 African Cup of Nations
8	2 June 1996	Stade Régional Nyamirambo, Kigali, Rwanda	Rwanda	1–0	3–1	1998 FIFA World Cup qualification (CAF)
9	2 June 1996	Stade Régional Nyamirambo, Kigali, Rwanda	Rwanda	2–0	3–1	1998 FIFA World Cup qualification (CAF)
10	16 June 1996	Stade El Menzah, Tunis, Tunisia	Rwanda	2–0	2–0	1998 FIFA World Cup qualification (CAF)
11	27 April 1997	Stade El Menzah, Tunis, Tunisia	Liberia	1–0	2–0	1998 FIFA World Cup qualification (CAF)
12	25 February 1998	Stade El Menzah, Tunis, Tunisia	Russia	1–2	2–3	Friendly
13	19 May 1998	Stade El Menzah, Tunis, Tunisia	Kenya	2–0	2–0	Friendly
14	3 June 1998	Parc des Sports, Avignon, France	Iceland	1–0	3–1	Friendly
15	3 June 1998	Parc des Sports, Avignon, France	Iceland	3–0	3–1	Friendly
16	24 January 1999	Stade 5 Juillet 1962, Alger, Algeria	Algeria	1–0	1–0	2000 African Cup of Nations qualification
17	10 April 1999	National Stadium, Kampala, Uganda	Uganda	2–0	2–0	2000 African Cup of Nations qualification
18	23 January 2000	National Stadium, Lagos, Nigeria	Nigeria	2–4	2–4	2000 African Cup of Nations
19	10 May 2002	Stade El Menzah, Tunis, Tunisia	Saudi Arabia	1–0	2–1	Friendly
20	20 May 2002	Iwate Athletic Stadium, Morioka, Japan	Malaysia	4–1	4–3	Friendly
