= Afef Fekih =

Tunisian-American control theorist

Afef Fekih is a Tunisian-American electrical engineer specializing in control theory, with applications including wind energy, unmanned aerial vehicles, and active suspensions. She is the Harold Callais Memorial and O'Krepki BORSF Endowed Professor in the Department of Electrical and Computer Engineering at the University of Louisiana at Lafayette, where she directs the Advanced Control Systems Laboratory. Fekih's primary research exploration involves the effective imrpovement of renewable energy and aerospace systems.

== Education and career ==
Fekih was a student at the National Engineering School of Tunis, Tunisia, where she received a bachelor's degree in 1995, master's degree in 1998, and Ph.D. in 2002.

After work as an assistant professor at the Higher Institute of Medical Technologies of Tunis, she became an adjunct professor and then visiting professor at the University of Louisiana at Lafayette in 2003 and 2004, and a regular-rank assistant professor in 2005. She was promoted to full professor in 2016. She is the director of the Advanced Controls Laboratory at the University of Louisiana at Lafayette, and she also holds the Harold Callais/BORSF Endowed Professorship in Electrical and Computer Engineering and the O'Krepki/BORSF Professorship in Telecommunications.

=== Professional activities ===
- Elected member, Board of Governors, IEEE Control Systems Society, 2025-current
- Appointed member, Board of Governors, IEEE Control Systems Society, 2023-2024
- Associate editor, IEEE Transactions on Control Systems Technology, 2025 – current
- Associate editor, ISA Transactions, 2024 – now.
- Associate editor, ASME Journal of Dynamic Systems, Measurement and Control, 2024 – current

== Recognition ==
Fekih received the University of Louisiana at Lafayette's Distinguished Professor Award in 2022. She was a 2025 recipient of the IEEE Control Systems Society Distinguished Member Award, given "for significant technical contributions in the area of fault tolerant control and outstanding service to the Control Systems Society".
