= Mohsen Labidi =

Tunisian footballer

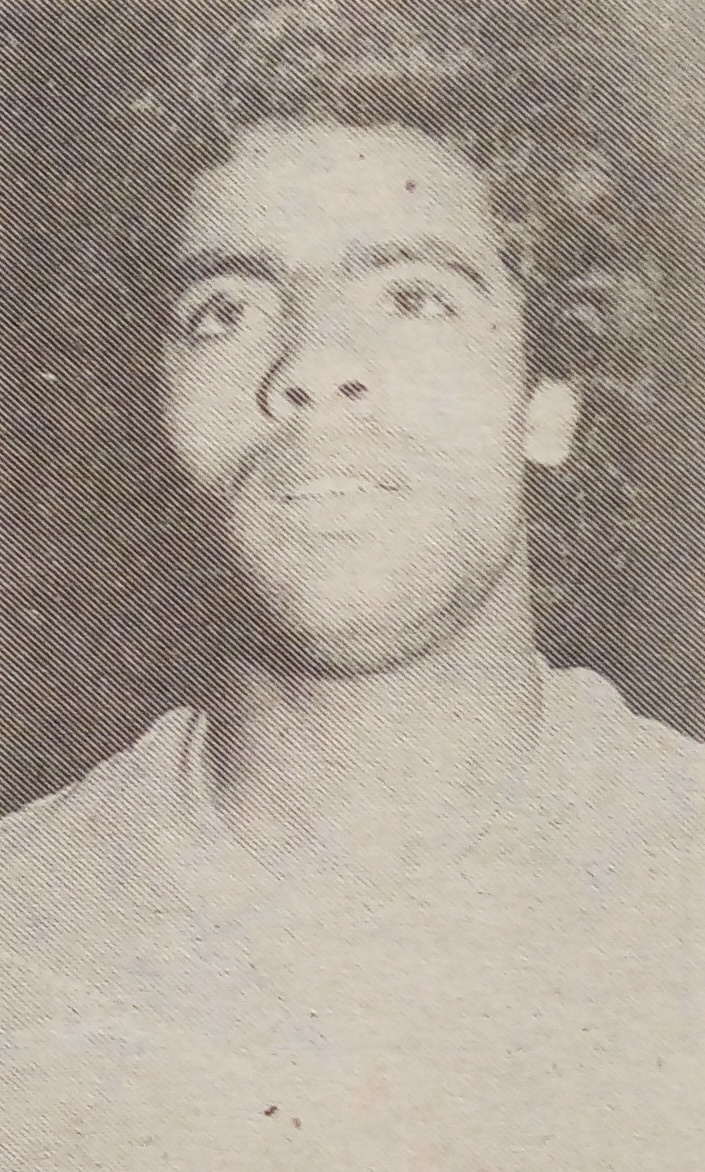
- Labidi in 1980

Personal information
- Date of birth: 15 January 1954 (age 72)
- Place of birth: Tunis, Tunisia
- Height: 1.80 m (5 ft 11 in)
- Position: Defender

Senior career*
Years	Team	Apps	(Gls)
1973–1979	Stade Tunisien		
1979–1982	Al-Ahli		
1982–1988	Stade Tunisien		

International career
1978–1983	Tunisia	4	(0)
- * Club domestic league appearances and goals

Mohsen Labidi (born 15 January 1954), also known as Mohsen Jendoubi, is a Tunisian football defender who played for Stade Tunisien and Al-Ahli and the Tunisia national team. He was part of Tunisia's squad in the 1978 FIFA World Cup.
