= Walid Azaïez =

Tunisian footballer

Personal information
- Date of birth: 25 April 1976 (age 50)
- Place of birth: Tunis, Tunisia
- Position: Defender

International career
Years	Team	Apps	(Gls)
1999–2002	Tunisia	17	(3)

Walid Azaïez (born 25 April 1976) is a Tunisian footballer. He played in 17 matches for the Tunisia national football team from 1999 to 2002. He was also named in Tunisia's squad for the 2000 African Cup of Nations tournament.
