= Tahar Chaïbi =

Tunisian footballer (1946–2014)

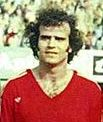
- Chaïbi in 1976

Personal information
- Date of birth: 17 February 1946
- Place of birth: Tunis, Tunisia
- Date of death: 29 April 2014 (aged 68)
- Position: Midfielder

Senior career*
Years	Team	Apps	(Gls)
1963–1976	Club Africain		

International career
1965–1972	Tunisia		
- * Club domestic league appearances and goals

Tahar Chaïbi (17 February 1946 – 29 April 2014) was a Tunisian footballer who played as a midfielder for Club Africain and the Tunisia national team.

He was born in Tunis, Tunisia. Chaïbi died from complications from a stroke, aged 68.
