= Linda Buthelezi =

South African former footballer

Personal information
- Full name: Innocent Linda Buthelezi
- Date of birth: 28 June 1969 (age 57)
- Place of birth: South Africa
- Height: 1.80 m (5 ft 11 in)
- Position: Midfielder

Senior career*
Years	Team	Apps	(Gls)
1988–1990	Jomo Cosmos	?	(?)
1991–1993	Kaizer Chiefs	?	(?)
1993–1994	Karabükspor	6	(0)
1994	Orlando Pirates	?	(?)
1995–1998	Mamelodi Sundowns	?	(?)
1998–1999	SuperSport United	?	(?)
Total		?	(?)

International career
1994–1997	South Africa	27	(0)
- * Club domestic league appearances and goals

Innocent Linda Buthelezi (born 28 June 1969) is a South African former soccer player who played at both professional and international levels as a midfielder. Buthelezi played club football for Jomo Cosmos, Kaizer Chiefs, Karabükspor, Orlando Pirates, Mamelodi Sundowns and SuperSport United. He went on unsuccessful trials at South Korean Pohang Atoms.

He also earned 27 caps for the South African national side between 1994 and 1997. He was part of the squad that won the 1996 African Cup of Nations and made unwanted international headlines in 1997 when a tackle on Paul Gascoigne saw the English midfielder stretchered off.
