= Mehdi Ben Slimane =

Tunisian footballer (born 1974)

Personal information
- Date of birth: 1 January 1974 (age 52)
- Place of birth: Le Kram, Tunisia
- Height: 1.70 m (5 ft 7 in)
- Position: Forward

Senior career*
Years	Team	Apps	(Gls)
1994–1996	AS Marsa		
1996–1997	Marseille	19	(0)
1997–2001	SC Freiburg	72	(11)
2000	→ Borussia M'gladbach (loan)	5	(0)
2001	→ Al-Nassr (loan)		
2002	Club Africain		

International career
1994–1999	Tunisia	34	(6)
- * Club domestic league appearances and goals

Mahdi Ben Slimane (Arabic: مهدي بن سليمان; born 1 January 1974) is a Tunisian former professional footballer who played as a forward.

Having begun his career at AS Marsa in his native country he moved to France in 1996 to play for Olympique de Marseille. After just one season at the club, he joined 2. Bundesliga side SC Freiburg whom helped to promotion to the Bundesliga. He spent half a season on loan each at Borussia Mönchengladbach (in 2000) and club Al-Nassr (in 2001) before leaving Freiburg and returning to Tunisia, where he spent a season and half at Club Africain.

At international level, he played for the Tunisia national team and was a member of squad at the 1998 FIFA World Cup, the 1996 African Cup of Nations, and the 1998 African Cup of Nations.

== Club career ==
In February 2000, Ben Slimane scored a brace for SC Freiburg contributing to 2–0 win against SSV Ulm.

== International career ==
Ben Slimane participated at the 1998 African Cup of Nations scoring twice for the Tunisia national team, one goal each against DR Congo on 12 February and against Togo on 16 February.

Together with Freiburg teammate Zoubeir Baya, he represented his country at the 1998 FIFA World Cup.

== Career statistics ==
Scores and results list Tunisia's goal tally first, score column indicates score after each Ben Slimane goal.

List of international goals scored by Mehdi Ben Slimane
No.	Date	Venue	Opponent	Score	Result	Competition
1	29 November 1995	Stade Chedli Zouiten, Tunis, Tunisia	Burkina Faso	3–0	3–0	Friendly
2	2 June 1996	Stade Régional Nyamirambo, Kigali, Rwanda	Rwanda	3–1	1–1	1998 FIFA World Cup qualification
3	7 August 1997	Stade El Menzah, Tunis, Tunisia	Zambia	1–0	3–1	1997 LG Cup
4	12 February 1998	Stade Municipal, Ouagadougou, Burkina Faso	DR Congo	1–0	2–1	1998 Africa Cup of Nations
5	16 February 1998	Stade Municipal, Ouagadougou, Burkina Faso	Togo	2–1	3–1	1998 Africa Cup of Nations
6	16 October 1999	Stade El Menzah, Tunis, Tunisia	United Arab Emirates	1–0	1–0	Friendly
