= Abdelkader Ben Hassen =

Tunisian footballer

Personal information
- Date of birth: 24 September 1969 (age 57)
- Position: Forward

International career
Years	Team	Apps	(Gls)
1995–1998	Tunisia	15	(5)

Abdelkader Ben Hassen (Arabic: عَبْد الْقَادِر بْن حَسَن; born 24 September 1969) is a Tunisian footballer. He played in 15 matches for the Tunisia national football team from 1995 to 1998. He was also named in Tunisia's squad for the 1996 African Cup of Nations tournament.
