= Sabri Jaballah =

Tunisian footballer

Personal information
- Full name: Sabri Jaballah
- Date of birth: 28 June 1973 (age 53)
- Place of birth: Tunisia
- Height: 1.84 m (6 ft 0 in)
- Position: Defender

Senior career*
Years	Team	Apps	(Gls)
1995–1996	AS Marsa		
1996–2001	Club Africain		
2001–2002	CS Sfaxien		
2003–2004	AS Marsa		
2005	EOG Kram		

International career
1995–2002	Tunisia	17	(1)
- * Club domestic league appearances and goals

Sabri Jaballah (Arabic: صبري جاب الله; born 28 June 1973) is a Tunisian footballer.

He played for a few clubs, including Club Africain, CS Sfaxien and Stade Tunisien.

Jaballah played for the Tunisia national football team and was a participant at the 1998 FIFA World Cup.
