= Lassâad Hanini =

Tunisian footballer (born 1971)

Personal information
- Date of birth: 2 May 1971 (age 55)
- Position: Defender

Senior career*
Years	Team	Apps	(Gls)
- Club Africain

International career
1995–1996	Tunisia	14	(0)
- * Club domestic league appearances and goals

Lassâad Hanini (born 2 May 1971) is a Tunisian former footballer who played as a defender for Club Africain. He made 14 appearances for the Tunisia national team in 1995 and 1996. He was also named in Tunisia's squad for the 1996 African Cup of Nations tournament.
