= Chokri El Ouaer =

Tunisian footballer and football administrator (born 1966)

Personal information
- Date of birth: August 15, 1966 (age 60)
- Place of birth: Tunis, Tunisia
- Height: 1.89 m (6 ft 2 in)
- Position: Goalkeeper

Senior career*
Years	Team	Apps	(Gls)
1983–2001	Espérance Tunis	452	(0)
2001-2002	Genoa	5	(0)
2002	Espérance Tunis	30	(0)
Total		487	(0)

International career
1990–2002	Tunisia	97	(0)

Managerial career
- 2007–2008: Espérance Tunis (sporting director)
- 2026–: Espérance Tunis (vice-president, football)
- * Club domestic league appearances and goals

Chokri El Ouaer (Arabic: شُكْرِيّ الْوَاعِر; born 15 August 1966) is a Tunisian former professional footballer who played as a goalkeeper, and a current football administrator. Regarded as one of the most decorated players in the history of Tunisian football, he spent virtually his entire playing career at Espérance Sportive de Tunis, with whom he won four CAF Champions League titles and the Afro-Asian Cup. In May 2026, he was appointed Vice-President of Espérance Sportive de Tunis, responsible for the football section.

== Playing career ==
=== Club career ===
The Tunisian international began playing for Espérance Sportive de Tunis in 1983, spending his entire career there except for a six-month spell with Genoa in 2001, near the end of his career. He retired shortly before the 2002 FIFA World Cup due to back problems, having announced his retirement on two previous occasions but persuaded to continue each time.

During his long tenure at Espérance, El Ouaer accumulated numerous national and continental honours, winning four CAF Champions League titles as well as the Afro-Asian Cup and several domestic league and cup trophies, establishing himself as one of the most successful players in the history of Tunisian club football.

=== International career ===
El Ouaer represented the Tunisia national football team from 1990 to 2002. Although he missed the 2002 FIFA World Cup due to back problems, he played at the 1998 FIFA World Cup. El Ouaer allegedly amassed near 100 caps for his country, but as with other Tunisian players this number is disputed by FIFA.

== Post-playing career ==
=== Sporting director at Espérance (2007–2008) ===
Following his retirement as a player, El Ouaer returned to Espérance Sportive de Tunis in an administrative capacity. During the 2007–08 season, he served as the club's sporting director, overseeing football operations at the Bab Souika institution.

=== Vice-President of Espérance Sportive de Tunis (2026–present) ===
In May 2026, internal sources at Espérance Sportive de Tunis confirmed that the club's board of directors had reached an agreement with El Ouaer to take over the supervision of collective sports sections, following the resignation of the incumbent, Riadh Bennour.

On 19 May 2026, Espérance Sportive de Tunis officially announced El Ouaer's appointment as Vice-President in charge of the football section, effective immediately. The club published the announcement on its official social media pages, confirming that El Ouaer had taken up his new duties at the club's headquarters that same day.

The official handover ceremony between Bennour and El Ouaer took place at Parc B, the club's training complex, in the presence of the squad, the coaching staff and club employees. The club described the occasion as both warm and emotional, given that both figures are considered historic personalities of the institution.

In its statement, Espérance described El Ouaer as "an emblematic goalkeeper of Espérance and a true legend of Tunisian football", noting that his return had generated considerable enthusiasm among the club's supporters. The appointment came during a period in which Espérance had finished as runners-up in the Tunisian Ligue Professionnelle 1 for the 2025–26 season and were eliminated in the semi-finals of the CAF Champions League, while still competing in the Tunisian Cup.

=== International ===
Tunisia

- Africa Cup of Nations: Runner-up 1996

=== Individual ===
- 1996 Africa Cup of Nations Team of the Tournament
