= Mark Williams (South African soccer) =

South African footballer (born 1966)

Personal information
- Full name: Mark Frank Williams
- Date of birth: 11 August 1966 (age 60)
- Place of birth: Cape Town, South Africa
- Position: Forward

Youth career
- 1978–1988: Clarewood AFC

Senior career*
Years	Team	Apps	(Gls)
1988–1990	Jomo Cosmos	28	(22)
1991	Mamelodi Sundowns	20	(5)
1992	Hellenic FC	19	(6)
1993	Cape Town Spurs	5	(2)
1993–1995	RWD Molenbeek	61	(17)
1995–1996	Wolverhampton Wanderers	12	(0)
1996	Corinthians	3	(0)
1996–1997	Kaizer Chiefs F.C.	17	(8)
1997	Guangdong Hongyuan F.C.	20	(3)
1998–2000	Qiánwéi Huándǎo	50	(36)
2001	Shanghai Zhongyuan Huili	20	(19)
2002	Qingdao Hademen	14	(1)
2002–2003	Moroka Swallows	8	(2)
2003	Brunei	6	(5)
Total		283	(107)

International career
1992–1997	South Africa	23	(8)
- * Club domestic league appearances and goals

Mark Williams (born 11 August 1966) is a South African former international footballer who played as a forward for many clubs throughout his career, including Corinthians (Brazil), Wolverhampton Wanderers (England), Chongqing Lifan (China), Qingdao Zhongneng (China) and RWDM (Belgium). At Wolves he scored once; his goal coming in a League Cup tie against Fulham in October 1995.

Internationally he is predominantly remembered for being in the squad that played in the 1996 African Cup of Nations where he was the joint second scorer with 4 goals, and scored both goals in the final after coming on as a substitute, in which South Africa beat Tunisia 2–0 to win the cup for the first time. When he retired he would have played for the South Africa national football team 23 times, scoring 8 goals. As of December 2006 he is playing for South African Beach Soccer team.

== International Career ==
Following South Africa's readmission to international football in 1992, Williams made his debut for the national team in their first official international match, a 1–0 victory over Cameroon on 7 July 1992. He made few appearances over the following years before scoring his first two international goals in a 2–2 friendly draw against Zambia on 22 November 1995.

Williams was subsequently selected for South Africa's squad for the 1996 African Cup of Nations, hosted on home soil. He scored in the opening group match against Cameroon before netting the only goal against Angola, securing South Africa's progression to the knockout stage. Williams started alongside Phil Masinga in the next two matches and assisted Mark Fish's goal in the quarter-final victory over Algeria. He retained his place for the semi-final against Ghana, which South Africa won 3–0, with Shaun Bartlett replacing the suspended Masinga and scoring his first goal of the tournament, which resulted in Williams losing his starting place when Masinga returned in the final. Having lost his starting place, Williams came off the bench against Tunisia in the final and scored twice in three minutes to secure a 2–0 victory, giving South Africa their first African Cup of Nations title. The victory is still widely regarded as a landmark achievement in South African football. He finished the tournament as joint second top scorer with teammate John Moshoeu, with four goals in six appearances, and was named in the Team of the Tournament alongside fellow South African Mark Fish.

Williams continued to represent South Africa during qualification for the 1998 FIFA World Cup and at the 1997 FIFA Confederations Cup, where he made three appearances. Following Clive Barker's dismissal as head coach after the tournament, Williams and former captain Neil Tovey were among the players dropped from the national team, ending his international career which had reached a high a year earlier after just eight goals in 23 appearances.

== Career statistics ==
=== International ===
South Africa national team
Year	Apps	Goals
1992	2	0
1993	1	0
1994	2	0
1995	3	2
1996	8	5
1997	7	1
Total	23	8

=== International goals ===
No.	Date	Venue	Opponent	Score	Result	Competition
1.	22 November 1995	Loftus Versfeld Stadium, Pretoria, South Africa	Zambia	1–?	2–2	Friendly
2.	22 November 1995	Loftus Versfeld Stadium, Pretoria, South Africa	Zambia	2–?	2–2	Friendly
3.	13 January 1996	FNB Stadium, Johannesburg, South Africa	Cameroon	2–0	3–0	1996 African Cup of Nations
4.	20 January 1996	FNB Stadium, Johannesburg, South Africa	Angola	1–0	1–0	1996 African Cup of Nations
5.	3 February 1996	FNB Stadium, Johannesburg, South Africa	Tunisia	1–0	2–0	1996 African Cup of Nations
6.	3 February 1996	FNB Stadium, Johannesburg, South Africa	Tunisia	2–0	2–0	1996 African Cup of Nations
7.	18 September 1996	Johannesburg Stadium, Johannesburg, South Africa	Australia	2–0	2–0	Friendly
8.	8 June 1997	FNB Stadium, Johannesburg, South Africa	Zambia	3–0	3–0	1998 FIFA World Cup qualification

== Honours ==
Qiánwéi Huándǎo

- Chinese FA Cup: 2000

Shanghai Zhongyuan Huili

- Chinese Jia B League: 2001

Qingdao Hademen

- Chinese FA Cup: 2002

South Africa

- African Cup of Nations: 1996
