= Sofiane Fekih =

Tunisian footballer (born 1969)

Personal information
- Date of birth: 9 August 1969 (age 57)
- Place of birth: Sfax, Tunisia
- Position: Midfielder

Senior career*
Years	Team	Apps	(Gls)
- CS Sfaxien

International career
1994–1998	Tunisia	43	(0)
- * Club domestic league appearances and goals

Sofiane Fekih (born 9 August 1969) is a Tunisian former footballer who played as a midfielder. He played in 43 matches for the Tunisia national team from 1994 to 1998. He was also named in Tunisia's squad for the 1998 African Cup of Nations tournament.
