= Zoubeir Baya =

Tunisian footballer (born 1971)

Personal information
- Date of birth: 15 May 1971 (age 55)
- Place of birth: M'saken, Tunisia
- Height: 1.76 m (5 ft 9 in)
- Position: Midfielder

Youth career
- 1981–1991: CS M'saken

Senior career*
Years	Team	Apps	(Gls)
1991–1997	Étoile du Sahel	127	(34)
1997–2001	SC Freiburg	114	(21)
2001–2002	Beşiktaş	26	(2)
2002–2005	Étoile du Sahel	52	(13)
2005–2006	CS M'saken		
Total		319	(70)

International career
1994–2002	Tunisia	83	(17)
- * Club domestic league appearances and goals

Zoubeir Baya (Arabic: زبير بية; born 15 May 1971) is a Tunisian former professional footballer who played as a midfielder.

Twice named Tunisian Footballer of the Year, Baya suited up for his country at the 1998 World Cup in France and at the 1996 Atlanta Olympics. He was also a key member of Tunisian sides that competed at the 1998, 2000 and 2002 African Nations Cup finals. He made his international swansong at the 2002 FIFA World Cup, retiring shortly afterwards.

== Career ==
Born in M'saken, Baya began his football career at Étoile du Sahel, helping the Tunisian club win the African Cup Winners' Cup. He made his debut for Tunisia on 4 September 1994 against Guinea-Bissau where he scored his first international goal. Over the past eight years, he has become an integral player for his country, earning 81 caps and scoring 18 goals for his country.

His hard work at Étoile du Sahel did not go unnoticed, as 2. Bundesliga club SC Freiburg signed him to a contract in 1997. In four seasons in Germany, Baya established himself as a star player and a regular starter, scoring 21 goals.

In 2001, Baya was on the move again, this time venturing to Turkey after signing with Beşiktaş. Baya was instrumental in helping Tunisia qualify for its second consecutive World Cup finals. He started in all eight games during the qualification round and scored six goals, finishing as his country's top goal scorer and one of the bright spots on a team wracked by inconsistency in the previous year. After the 2002 FIFA World Cup, he returned to Étoile du Sahel to play out the rest of his playing career.

After completing two seasons with Etoile du Sahel he returned to home club CS M'saken for a season in the Tunisian second division before retiring.

== Career statistics ==
Scores and results list Tunisia's goal tally first, score column indicates score after each Baya goal.

List of international goals scored by Zoubeir Baya
No.	Date	Venue	Opponent	Score	Result	Competition
1	10 June 1994	Stade Léopold Sédar Senghor, Dakar, Senegal	Senegal	1–2	2–2	Friendly
2	10 June 1994	Stade Léopold Sédar Senghor, Dakar, Senegal	Senegal	2–2	2–2	Friendly
3	29 January 1995	Stade El Menzah, Tunis, Tunisia	Mauritania	1–0	1–0	1996 Africa Cup of Nations qualification
4	4 June 1995	Stade de Kégué, Lomé, Togo	Togo	1–0	1–0	1996 Africa Cup of Nations qualification
5	15 December 1995	Stade El Menzah, Tunis, Tunisia	Libya	3–1	4–1	Friendly
6	2 January 1996	Stade El Menzah, Tunis, Tunisia	Guinea	1–0	3–0	Friendly
7	4 January 1996	Princess Magogo Stadium, Durban, South Africa	Angola	3–0	5–1	Friendly
8	28 January 1996	Free State Stadium, Bloemfontein, South Africa	Gabon	1–0	1–1	1996 Africa Cup of Nations
9	31 January 1996	Kings Park Stadium, Durban, South Africa	Zambia	2–0	4–2	1996 Africa Cup of Nations
10	12 January 1997	Stade El Menzah, Tunis, Tunisia	Egypt	1–0	1–0	1998 FIFA World Cup qualification
11	17 August 1997	Stade El Menzah, Tunis, Tunisia	Namibia	1–0	4–0	1998 FIFA World Cup qualification
12	17 August 1997	Stade El Menzah, Tunis, Tunisia	Namibia	3–0	4–0	1998 FIFA World Cup qualification
13	27 February 1999	Stade El Menzah, Tunis, Tunisia	Uganda	4–0	6–0	2000 Africa Cup of Nations qualification
14	6 June 1999	Stade El Menzah, Tunis, Tunisia	Algeria	2–0	2–0	2000 Africa Cup of Nations qualification
15	8 July 2000	Stade El Menzah, Tunis, Tunisia	Madagascar	1–0	1–0	2002 FIFA World Cup qualification
16	25 February 2001	Stade El Menzah, Tunis, Tunisia	DR Congo	5–0	6–0	2002 FIFA World Cup qualification
17	9 May 2001	Stade El Menzah, Tunis, Tunisia	Liberia	3–0	7–0	Friendly
18	9 May 2001	Stade El Menzah, Tunis, Tunisia	Liberia	7–0	7–0	Friendly
19	1 July 2001	Stade El Menzah, Tunis, Tunisia	Congo	3–0	6–0	2002 FIFA World Cup qualification
20	1 July 2001	Stade El Menzah, Tunis, Tunisia	Congo	5–0	6–0	2002 FIFA World Cup qualification
21	15 July 2001	Stade des Martyrs, Kinshasa, Congo DR	DR Congo	2–0	3–0	2002 FIFA World Cup qualification
22	15 July 2001	Stade des Martyrs, Kinshasa, Congo DR	DR Congo	3–0	3–0	2002 FIFA World Cup qualification
23	20 March 2002	Ullevaal Stadion, Oslo, Norway	Norway	1 - 1	1–2	Friendly
24	30 April 2002	Stade El Menzah, Tunis, Tunisia	Malta	2–1	2–1	Friendly
25	25 May 2002	Mohammed Al-Hamad Stadium, Kuwait City, Kuwait	Kuwait	1–0	3–1	Friendly
26	25 May 2002	Mohammed Al-Hamad Stadium, Kuwait City, Kuwait	Kuwait	2–0	3–1	Friendly
27	25 May 2002	Mohammed Al-Hamad Stadium, Kuwait City, Kuwait	Kuwait	3–1	3–1	Friendly
