= Rwanda at the Africa Cup of Nations =

Rwanda participated once in the Africa Cup of Nations in 2004 in Tunisia. At the tournament, they lost their opening match 2–1 to Tunisia before winning their first ever point in the competition after a 1–1 draw against Guinea. Rwanda went on to beat DR Congo in their final group match by a 1–0 scoreline, but it wasn't enough, as elsewhere in the group, Guinea and Tunisia drew, meaning both teams progressed to the quarter-finals, and Rwanda were eliminated.

== Overall record ==
Africa Cup of Nations record
Appearances: 1
Year	Round	Position	Pld	W	D	L	GF	GA
(Sudan) 1957 to (Ethiopia) 1962	Part of Belgium							
(Ghana) 1963 to (Ethiopia) 1976	Not affiliated to CAF							
(Ghana) 1978 to (Nigeria) 1980	Did not enter							
(Libya) 1982 to (Ivory Coast) 1984	Did not qualify							
(Egypt) 1986	Did not enter							
(Morocco) 1988	Withdrew							
(Algeria) 1990 to (Burkina Faso) 1998	Did not enter							
(Ghana) (Nigeria) 2000 to (Mali) 2002	Did not qualify							
(Tunisia) 2004	Group stage	9th	3	1	1	1	3	3
(Egypt) 2006 to (South Africa) 2013	Did not qualify							
(Equatorial Guinea) 2015	Disqualified							
(Gabon) 2017 to (Morocco) 2025	Did not qualify							
(Kenya) (Tanzania) (Uganda) 2027	To be determined							
Total	Group stage	1/35	3	1	1	1	3	3

== Tournaments ==
=== 2004 African Cup of Nations ===
==== Group stage ====
Pos	Team	Pld	W	D	L	GF	GA	GD	Pts	Qualification
1	Tunisia (H)	3	2	1	0	6	2	+4	7	Advance to knockout stage
2	Guinea	3	1	2	0	4	3	+1	5	Advance to knockout stage
3	Rwanda	3	1	1	1	3	3	0	4	
4	DR Congo	3	0	0	3	1	6	−5	0	

Source: Soccerway
(H) Hosts
24 January 2004
19:30

Tunisia	2–1	Rwanda
Jaziri 27'; Santos 57'	Report	Elias 31'

7 November Stadium, Tunis
Attendance: 60,000
Referee: Raphaël Evehe Divine (Cameroon)

28 January 2004
14:00

Rwanda	1–1	Guinea
K. Kamanzi 90+3'	Report	T. Camara 49'

15 October Stadium, Bizerte
Attendance: 4,000
Referee: Modou Sowe (Gambia)

1 February 2004
14:00

Rwanda	1–0	DR Congo
Makasi 74'	Report

15 October Stadium, Bizerte
Attendance: 700
Referee: Falla N'Doye (Senegal)

== Goalscorers ==
Rank	Player	2004	Goals
1	João Elias Manamana	1	1
1	Karim Kamanzi	1	1
1	Saïd Makasi	1	1
Total		3	3

– Best goalscorer(s) of the team
