= FC Djursland =

Former Danish football club

- Full name: Fodbold Club Djursland
- Nickname(s): Hajerne (The Sharks)
- Founded: 5 November 2009; 15 years ago
- Dissolved: 2023; 2 years ago
- Ground: Grenaa Idrætscenter
- 2022–23: Denmark Series; Group 4, 8th of 8 (relegated)
- Website: https://www.fcdjursland.dk/
Home colours	Away colours

FC Djursland was an association football club based in the town of Grenaa, Denmark. The club was a merger established in Djursland in 2009, originally between five parent clubs: Grenaa IF, Østdjurs 91, AC Norddjurs, Åstrup/Hammelev IF and Kolind Pederstrup. The club played its home matches at Grenaa Idrætscenter.

== History ==
FC Djursland was presented on 5 November 2009 as a cooperative superstructure between Grenaa IF, Østdjurs 91, AC Norddjurs, Åstrup/Hammelev IF and Kolind Pederstrup. Vice-mayor of Grenaa Municipality and an active member of Grenaa IF, Keld Overgaard Jensen, functioned as a driving force in the merger. Djursland Bank became attached to the new club as the main sponsor for the first three years of its existence. Åstrup/Hammelev IF, one of the parent clubs of the merger, had already been established in 1995 as a superstructure of the clubs Åstrup IF and Hammelev IF, and chairman of the club, Søren Slemming, stated after the realisation of FC Djursland that a merger would not be damaging to the parent clubs, as they already had established an extensive cooperation agreement in the youth teams. FC Djursland would compete on the existing DBU licence Grenaa IF, who at that point competed in the Denmark Series, the fourth tier of Danish football.

The goal of the new club was, as former chairman of FC Djursland, Benny Sørensen stated, to bring football in the Djursland area into the higher divisions. This could only be achieved by uniting a number of regional clubs in the collaboration, which, in time, could form a counterweight to the dominance of the larger clubs in Aarhus and Randers, AGF and Randers FC.

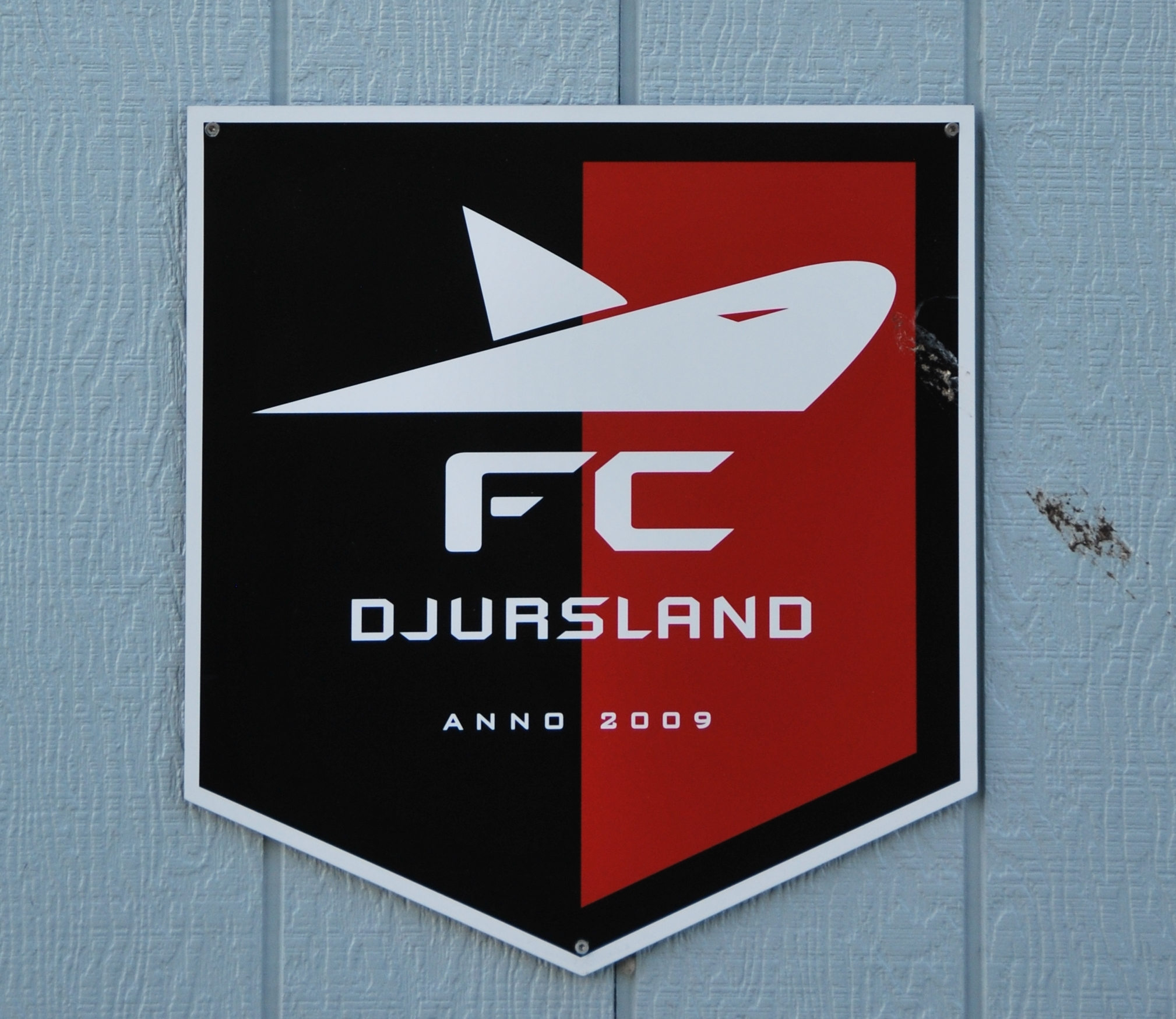
FC Djursland logo outside club facilities.

The team played their first match against AGF on 27 June at Grenaa Idrætscenter. They would, during their debut season, reach promotion to the Danish 2nd Division, the third tier of the Danish football league system. However, they would only last one season at the third level, suffering relegation by only one point on the last day of the season after losing 2–1 at Tjørring IF who had already been relegated. Following the relegation back to the Denmark Series, club captain Martin Andersen, who had scored five goals the season before, left the club to become player-assistant at Nørager Boldklub. Furthermore, FC Djursland lost their top goalscorer Christoffer Hansen, who signed with Blokhus FC on a two-year deal after having scored 16 goals. Heading into the new season, the goal was direct promotion back into the third tier but after struggling in the first half of the season, the club hauled in a key addition, Iddi Alkhag, who came with previous experience from the Danish Superliga and would take on the role as player-assistant. The season ended with a disappointing midtable finish; 8th place in Group 3. In the Danish Cup, FC Djursland were knocked out early on after a crushing 1–8 loss to Randers FC.

Two months into the 2012–13 season, Emmanuel Ake, another player with multiple years of experience at the highest level, joined FC Djursland. With him as their star player, the club reached promotion to the Danish 2nd Division by finishing third in Group 3, which was achieved in the final round of regular season after drawing 2–2 against Aalborg Freja.

In 2023, the remaining partner clubs of FC Djursland—Grenaa IF, AC Norddjurs, and Østdjurs 91—agreed to dissolve the club after 14 years. The decision was based on the recognition that the collaborative arrangement was no longer viable. The dissolution took effect from January 2024, with Grenaa IF assuming responsibility for the first team and its operations. Sponsorship agreements remained in place, and the decision to dissolve was made amicably.

== Honours ==
=== Domestic ===
==== National leagues ====
- 2nd Division (DBU level 3)
  - Best league performance:
    Fourteenth place (1): 2010–11 (WG)
- Denmark Series (DBU level 4)
  - Best league performance:
    Third place (1): 2012–13 (G3)

==== Regional leagues ====
- Jyllandsserien^{5}
  - Winners (2): 2017–18 (P), 2021–22 P
- JBUs Serie 1^{6}
  - Winners (1): 2016 (G7)
