= 2004 African Cup of Nations =

كأس الأمم الإفريقية 2004; Coupe d'Afrique des Nations 2004

Tournament details
- Host country: Tunisia
- Dates: 24 January – 14 February
- Teams: 16
- Venues: 6 (in 5 host cities)

Final positions
- Champions: Tunisia (1st title)
- Runners-up: Morocco
- Third place: Nigeria
- Fourth place: Mali

Tournament statistics
- Matches played: 32
- Goals scored: 88 (2.75 per match)
- Attendance: 617,500 (19,297 per match)
- Top scorers: (Cameroon) Patrick Mboma; (Mali) Frédéric Kanouté; (Nigeria) Jay-Jay Okocha; (Tunisia) Francileudo Santos; (4 goals each)
- Best player: (Nigeria) Jay-Jay Okocha

The 2004 African Cup of Nations, known as the Nokia 2004 Africa Cup of Nations for sponsorship purposes, was the 24th edition of the African Cup of Nations, the biennial international men's football championship of Africa organised by the Confederation of African Football (CAF). The tournament was played between 24 January and 14 February 2004 in Tunisia, taking place in the country for the third time following the 1965 and 1994 editions. The organization of the 2004 edition was awarded to Tunisia on 4 September 2000.

The defending champions were Cameroon from the 2002 edition. A total of 32 matches were played, in which 88 goals were scored, at an average of 2.75 goals per match. Attendance at all stages of the tournament reached 617,500, averaging 19,297 viewers per match. Qualification took place from 7 September 2002 to 6 July 2003. Cameroon as title holder and Tunisia as host country automatically qualified for the final phase of the tournament. As in the 2002 edition, sixteen teams, divided into four groups each comprising four teams, took part in the competition. The defending champions Cameroon were eliminated in the quarter-finals after losing 1–2 against Nigeria's Super eagles. Tunisia won the title for the first time in their history, after beating one-time champions Morocco in the final match with a score of 2–1, so the Eagles of Carthage are the 13th selection in history to be crowned African champions. Nigeria secured third place after beating Mali in the third place match, which placed them fourth.

Four players scored the most goals at the end of the tournament: Tunisian Francileudo Santos, Cameroonian Patrick Mboma, Malian Frédéric Kanouté and Nigerian Jay-Jay Okocha, however the top scorer title was given to Tunisia's Santos as he was the player of the champion team and did not receive any cards throughout the tournament, while Nigeria's Okocha won the best player award. As champions, Tunisia qualified for the 2005 FIFA Confederations Cup in Germany, as a representative of African continent.

== Host selection ==
The organization of the 2004 edition was awarded to Tunisia on 4 September 2000 by the CAF Executive Committee meeting in Cairo, Egypt. Voters had a choice between four countries : Malawi and Zambia (joint bid), Tunisia and Zimbabwe. Benin and Togo were both also candidates at the start (joint bid) but withdrew on 4 September 2000 before the meeting. This edition was awarded to Tunisia which represented Africa in the 1998 FIFA World Cup in France by taking the majority of the votes of the CAF Executive Committee members which are 13 after its impressive success in the 1994 edition. This is the third time that Tunisia has hosted the African Cup after 1965 and 1994 editions. Two years before the start of the tournament, an organizing committee (Comité d'organisation de la Coupe d'Afrique des Nations; COCAN) was established, headed by Slim Chiboub (who was the head of the organizing committee in 1994).

Voting results
Country	Votes
Tunisia	9
Zimbabwe	3
Malawi / (Zambia) Zambia	1
Benin / (Togo) Togo	Withdrew
Total votes	13

== Prize money ==
Each of the four teams eliminated in the quarter-finals received a bonus of 61,000 euros for reaching this level of competition. The semi-finalists received 122,600 euros, the finalists 245,200 euros and the winner 280,000 euros. Compensation was also provided to help the various federations, calculated according to the length of each team's stay in Tunisia and based on a daily lump sum of 6 euros per player and coach.

Final position	Prize money
Champions	280,000 euros
Runners-up	245,200 euros
Semi-finalists	122,600 euros
Quarter-finalists	61,000 euros

== Marketing ==
=== Sponsorship ===
On 20 September 2003, in Tunis, Nokia acquired from CAF the right to be the "title sponsor" of the 24th edition, which is therefore officially called Nokia Africa Cup of Nations, Tunisia 2004.

Title sponsor	Official sponsors	Regional sponsors
Nokia	Toyota; Pepsi; Henkel; Western Union; The Laughing Cow; Glo	Tunisie Telecom; Tunisair; AGIL; Délice Danone

=== Mascot ===
Official mascot poster.

To choose the tournament mascot, the organizing committee is launching a competition open to the entire Tunisian population. The only rules imposed, this mascot must be an eagle and must represent football, Africa and Tunisia. Of the fifty or so proposals submitted to the committee, it is the work of Malek Khalfallah that is retained. It is an eagle, which the author baptized Nçayir. The colors of its equipment, red and white, refer to the colors of the Tunisian flag.

=== Match ball ===
The official ball for the 2004 African Cup of Nations is the Adidas Fevernova. Designed two years earlier by Adidas for the 2002 FIFA World Cup held in South Korea and Japan and 2003 FIFA Women's World Cup held in the United States, the ball was reused during the 2004 African Cup of Nations.

== Venues ==
Location of the Tunisian host cities of the 2004 African Cup of Nations
1 Tunis
2 Sousse
3 Sfax
4 Monastir
5 Bizerte

The main host cities are concentrated on the country's coastal strip: Bizerte, Monastir, Sousse, Sfax and Tunis. The 7 November Stadium is the largest stadium in the country with a capacity of 60,000 spectators, located in city of Radès, in the southern suburb of the city Tunis, it was built to host the 2001 Mediterranean Games and opened on 6 July 2001. The stadium obtains the Class 1 Certificate from the World Athletics, which means that it reaches the best standards and specifications in its field.

El Menzah Stadium in Tunis and Sousse Olympic Stadium in Sousse hosted matches of the 1994 African Cup of Nations. Taieb Mhiri Stadium in Sfax was one of the stadiums of the 1965 African Cup of Nations. Mustapha Ben Jannet Stadium in Monastir and 15 October Stadium in Bizerte have also been added to host the event. All stadiums were renovated before the start of the tournament.

=== Stadiums ===
List of candidate host cities
City	Stadium	Capacity
Bizerte	15 October Stadium	20,000
Monastir	Mustapha Ben Jannet Stadium	22,000
Sfax	Taieb Mhiri Stadium	22,000
Sousse	Sousse Olympic Stadium	28,000
Tunis	7 November Stadium	60,000
Tunis	El Menzah Stadium	45,000

== Qualification ==
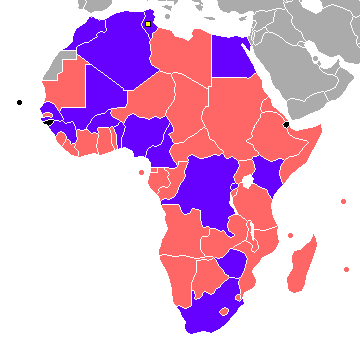
Qualified Failed to qualify Withdrew or did not enter Not part of CAF

Qualification took place from 7 September 2002 to 6 July 2003. The 49 nations registered for the competition are divided into thirteen groups: ten groups of four teams and three groups of three teams. The selections of Guinea-Bissau, São Tomé and Príncipe and Djibouti forfeit before the start of qualifying. The first of each group qualify for the final tournament in Tunisia, as well as the best of the second. Cameroon, as defending champion, and Tunisia, as host country, are automatically qualified for the final phase of the competition. Benin, Rwanda and Zimbabwe managed to qualify for the African Cup of Nations for the first final phase of their history, after finishing at the top of their group in the qualifiers in front of two former African champions, Sudan and Ghana.

=== Qualified teams ===
The following sixteen teams qualified for the tournament.

Team	Qualification method	Appearance(s)				Previous best performance	WR
Team	Qualification method	Total	First	Last	Streak	Previous best performance	WR
Tunisia	Hosts	11th	1962	2002	6	Runners-up (1965, 1996)	45
Cameroon	Holders	13th	1970	2002	5	Winners (1984, 1988, 2000, 2002)	14
Nigeria	Group A winners	13th	1963	2002	3	Winners (1980, 1994)	35
Guinea	Group B winners	7th	1970	1998	1	Runners-up (1976)	102
Benin	Group C winners	1st	Debut				123
Burkina Faso	Group D winners	6th	1978	2002	5	Fourth place (1998)	72
Kenya	Group E winners	5th	1972	1992	1	Group stage (1972, 1988, 1990, 1992)	76
Mali	Group F winners	4th	1972	2002	2	Runners-up (1972)	51
Morocco	Group G winners	12th	1972	2002	4	Winners (1976)	38
Senegal	Group H winners	9th	1965	2002	3	Runners-up (2002)	33
DR Congo	Group I winners	14th	1965	2002	7	Winners (1968, 1974)	54
Egypt	Group J winners	19th	1957	2002	11	Winners (1957, 1959, 1986, 1998)	32
South Africa	Group K winners	5th	1996	2002	5	Winners (1996)	36
Algeria	Group L winners	13th	1968	2002	5	Winners (1990)	63
Rwanda	Group M winners	1st	Debut				109
Zimbabwe	Group F runner-up	1st	Debut				49

== Squads ==
As is the case in all versions of the African Cup of Nations, each team participating in the tournament must consist of 23 players (including three goalkeepers). Participating national teams must confirm the final list of 23 players no later than ten days before the start of the tournament. In the event that a player suffers an injury which prevents him from participating in the tournament, his team has the right to replace him with another player at any time up to 24 hours before the team's first game.

== Match officials ==
The following referees were chosen for the 2004 Africa Cup of Nations.

=== Referees ===
- (Cameroon) Divine Evehe
- (Ivory Coast) Abubakar Sharaf
- (South Africa) Jerome Damon
- (The Gambia) Modou Sowe
- (Ethiopia) Tessama Hailemalek
- (Senegal) Falla N'Doye
- (Morocco) Mohamed Guezzaz
- (Libya) Abdul Hakim Shelmani
- (Egypt) Essam Abdel-Fatah
- (Burkina Faso) Lassina Paré
- (Benin) Coffi Codjia
- (Luxembourg) Alain Hamer
- (Seychelles) Eddy Maillet
- (Mali) Koman Coulibaly
- (United Arab Emirates) Ali Bujsaim
- (Tunisia) Hichem Guirat

== Draw ==
The draw was held on 20 September 2003 at 16:00 GMT at the Hotel Renaissance in Gammarth. The sixteen teams were divided into four pots according to their performances in past Cup of Nations tournaments. The January 2004 FIFA World Rankings (shown in parentheses).

Pot 1	Pot 2	Pot 3	Pot 4
Tunisia (hosts); Cameroon (title holders); Nigeria; Senegal	Algeria; South Africa; Egypt; DR Congo	Morocco; Burkina Faso; Mali; Guinea	Kenya; Rwanda; Benin; Zimbabwe

== Group stage ==
Teams highlighted in green progress to the quarter-finals.

All times local: CET (UTC+1)

=== Tiebreakers ===
Teams were ranked according to points (3 points for a win, 1 point for a draw, 0 points for a loss), and if tied on points, the following tiebreaking criteria were applied, in the order given, to determine the rankings (Regulations Article 74):

1. Points in head-to-head matches among tied teams;
2. Goal difference in head-to-head matches among tied teams;
3. Goals scored in head-to-head matches among tied teams;
4. If more than two teams were tied, and after applying all head-to-head criteria above, a subset of teams were still tied, all head-to-head criteria above were reapplied exclusively to this subset of teams;
5. Goal difference in all group matches;
6. Goals scored in all group matches;
7. Drawing of lots.

=== Group A ===
Pos	Team	Pld	W	D	L	GF	GA	GD	Pts	Qualification
1	Tunisia (H)	3	2	1	0	6	2	+4	7	Advance to knockout stage
2	Guinea	3	1	2	0	4	3	+1	5	Advance to knockout stage
3	Rwanda	3	1	1	1	3	3	0	4	
4	DR Congo	3	0	0	3	1	6	−5	0	

Source: Soccerway
(H) Hosts
24 January 2004
19:30

Tunisia	2–1	Rwanda
Jaziri 27'; Santos 57'	Report	Elias 31'

7 November Stadium, Tunis
Attendance: 60,000
Referee: Raphaël Evehe Divine (Cameroon)
25 January 2004
14:00

DR Congo	1–2	Guinea
Masudi 35'	Report	T. Camara 68'; Feindouno 81'

El Menzah Stadium, Tunis
Attendance: 2,000
Referee: Abubakar Sharaf (Ivory Coast)

28 January 2004
14:00

Rwanda	1–1	Guinea
K. Kamanzi 90+3'	Report	T. Camara 49'

15 October Stadium, Bizerte
Attendance: 4,000
Referee: Modou Sowe (Gambia)
28 January 2004
16:15

Tunisia	3–0	DR Congo
Santos 55', 87'; Braham 65'	Report

7 November Stadium, Tunis
Attendance: 60,000
Referee: Jerome Damon (South Africa)

1 February 2004
14:00

Tunisia	1–1	Guinea
Ben Achour 58'	Report	T. Camara 84'

7 November Stadium, Tunis
Attendance: 35,000
Referee: Hailemalek Tessama (Ethiopia)
1 February 2004
14:00

Rwanda	1–0	DR Congo
Makasi 74'	Report

15 October Stadium, Bizerte
Attendance: 700
Referee: Falla N'Doye (Senegal)

=== Group B ===
Pos	Team	Pld	W	D	L	GF	GA	GD	Pts	Qualification
1	Mali	3	2	1	0	7	3	+4	7	Advance to knockout stage
2	Senegal	3	1	2	0	4	1	+3	5	Advance to knockout stage
3	Kenya	3	1	0	2	4	6	−2	3	
4	Burkina Faso	3	0	1	2	1	6	−5	1	

Source: Soccerway
26 January 2004
14:00

Kenya	1–3	Mali
Mulama 58'	Report	Sissoko 28'; Kanouté 63', 81'

15 October Stadium, Bizerte
Attendance: 6,000
Referee: Hailemalak Tessema (Ethiopia)
26 January 2004
19:00

Senegal	0–0	Burkina Faso
	Report

El Menzah Stadium, Tunis
Attendance: 2,000
Referee: Mohamed Guezzaz (Morocco)

30 January 2004
14:00

Senegal	3–0	Kenya
Niang 4', 31'; Bouba Diop 19'	Report

15 October Stadium, Bizerte
Attendance: 13,500
Referee: Essam Abdel-Fatah (Egypt)
30 January 2004
19:00

Burkina Faso	1–3	Mali
Minoungou 50'	Report	Kanouté 34'; Diarra 37'; S. Coulibaly 78'

El Menzah Stadium, Tunis
Attendance: 1,500
Referee: Abdel Hakim Shelmani (Libya)

2 February 2004
14:00

Senegal	1–1	Mali
Beye 45+2'	Report	D. Traoré 34'

El Menzah Stadium, Tunis
Attendance: 7,550
Referee: Raphaël Evehe Divine (Cameroon)
2 February 2004
14:00

Burkina Faso	0–3	Kenya
	Report	Ake 51'; Oliech 64'; Baraza 83'

15 October Stadium, Bizerte
Attendance: 4,550
Referee: Modou Sowe (Gambia)

=== Group C ===
Pos	Team	Pld	W	D	L	GF	GA	GD	Pts	Qualification
1	Cameroon	3	1	2	0	6	4	+2	5	Advance to knockout stage
2	Algeria	3	1	1	1	4	4	0	4	Advance to knockout stage
3	Egypt	3	1	1	1	3	3	0	4	
4	Zimbabwe	3	1	0	2	6	8	−2	3	

Source: Soccerway
25 January 2004
16:30

Zimbabwe	1–2	Egypt
P. Ndlovu 46'	Report	Abdel Hamid 58'; Barakat 63'

Taieb Mhiri Stadium, Sfax
Attendance: 22,000
Referee: Lassina Paré (Burkina Faso)
25 January 2004
19:00

Cameroon	1–1	Algeria
M'Boma 43'	Report	Zafour 52'

Sousse Olympic Stadium, Sousse
Attendance: 20,000
Referee: Coffi Codjia (Benin)

29 January 2004
16:30

Cameroon	5–3	Zimbabwe
M'Boma 31', 44', 65'; M'Bami 40', 67'	Report	P. Ndlovu 8', 47' (pen.); Nyandoro 89'

Taieb Mhiri Stadium, Sfax
Attendance: 15,000
Referee: Abubakar Sharaf (Ivory Coast)
29 January 2004
19:00

Algeria	2–1	Egypt
Mamouni 13'; Achiou 86'	Report	Belal 25'

Sousse Olympic Stadium, Sousse
Attendance: 15,000
Referee: Alain Hamer (Luxembourg)

3 February 2004
14:00

Cameroon	0–0	Egypt
	Report

Mustapha Ben Jannet Stadium, Monastir
Attendance: 20,000
Referee: Ali Bujsaim (United Arab Emirates)
3 February 2004
14:00

Algeria	1–2	Zimbabwe
Achiou 73'	Report	A. Ndlovu 65'; Lupahla 71'

Sousse Olympic Stadium, Sousse
Attendance: 10,000
Referee: Eddy Maillet (Seychelles)

=== Group D ===
Pos	Team	Pld	W	D	L	GF	GA	GD	Pts	Qualification
1	Morocco	3	2	1	0	6	1	+5	7	Advance to knockout stage
2	Nigeria	3	2	0	1	6	2	+4	6	Advance to knockout stage
3	South Africa	3	1	1	1	3	5	−2	4	
4	Benin	3	0	0	3	1	8	−7	0	

Source: Soccerway
27 January 2004
14:00

Nigeria	0–1	Morocco
	Report	Hadji 77'

Mustapha Ben Jannet Stadium, Monastir
Attendance: 15,000
Referee: Falla N'Doye (Senegal)
27 January 2004
18:00

South Africa	2–0	Benin
Nomvethe 58', 76'	Report

Taieb Mhiri Stadium, Sfax
Attendance: 12,000
Referee: Koman Coulibaly (Mali)

31 January 2004
14:00

Nigeria	4–0	South Africa
Yobo 4'; Okocha 64' (pen.); Odemwingie 81', 83'	Report

Mustapha Ben Jannet Stadium, Monastir
Attendance: 15,000
Referee: Ali Bujsaim (United Arab Emirates)
31 January 2004
18:00

Morocco	4–0	Benin
Chamakh 17'; Adjamossi 73' (o.g.); Ouaddou 75'; El Karkouri 80'	Report

Taieb Mhiri Stadium, Sfax
Attendance: 20,000
Referee: Eddy Maillet (Seychelles)

4 February 2004
18:00

Morocco	1–1	South Africa
Safri 38' (pen.)	Report	Mayo 29'

Sousse Olympic Stadium, Sousse
Attendance: 6,000
Referee: Hichem Guirat (Tunisia)
4 February 2004
18:00

Nigeria	2–1	Benin
Lawal 35'; Utaka 76'	Report	Latoundji 90'

Taieb Mhiri Stadium, Sfax
Attendance: 15,000
Referee: Essam Abdel-Fatah (Egypt)

== Knockout stage ==
Quarter-finals
7 February – Tunis (Radès)
Tunisia	1
Senegal	0
8 February – Monastir
Cameroon	1
Nigeria	2
8 February – Sfax
Morocco (a.e.t.)	3
Algeria	1
7 February – Tunis (El Menzah)
Mali	2
Guinea	1

Semi-finals
11 February – Tunis (Radès)
Tunisia (pen.)	1 (5)
Nigeria	1 (3)
11 February – Sousse
Morocco	4
Mali	0

Final
14 February – Tunis (Radès)
Tunisia	2
Morocco	1
Third place
13 February – Monastir
Nigeria	2
Mali	1

=== Quarter-finals ===
7 February 2004
14:00

Mali	2–1	Guinea
Kanouté 45'; Diarra 90'	Report	Feindouno 15'

El Menzah Stadium, Tunis
Attendance: 1,450
Referee: Essam Abdel-Fatah (Egypt)

7 February 2004
17:00

Tunisia	1–0	Senegal
Mnari 65'	Report

7 November Stadium, Tunis
Attendance: 60,000
Referee: Ali Bujsaim (United Arab Emirates)

8 February 2004
14:00

Cameroon	1–2	Nigeria
Eto'o 42'	Report	Okocha 45'; Utaka 73'

Mustapha Ben Jannet Stadium, Monastir
Attendance: 14,750
Referee: Mohamed Guezzaz (Morocco)

8 February 2004
17:00

Morocco	3–1 (a.e.t.)	Algeria
Chamakh 90+4'; Hadji 113'; Zairi 120+1'	Report	Cherrad 84'

Taieb Mhiri Stadium, Sfax
Attendance: 22,000
Referee: Abdel Hakim Shelmani (Libya)

=== Semi-finals ===
11 February 2004
16:00

Tunisia	1–1 (a.e.t.)	Nigeria
Badra 82' (pen.)	Report	Okocha 67' (pen.)
Penalties
Badra (penalty scored); Santos (penalty scored); Mhedhebi (penalty scored); Ben Achour (penalty scored); Haggui (penalty scored)	5–3	(penalty scored) Utaka; (penalty missed) Odemwingie; (penalty scored) Yobo; (penalty scored) Udeze

7 November Stadium, Tunis
Attendance: 60,000
Referee: Coffi Codjia (Benin)

11 February 2004
19:00

Morocco	4–0	Mali
Mokhtari 14', 58'; Hadji 80'; Baha 90+1'	Report

Sousse Olympic Stadium, Sousse
Attendance: 15,000
Referee: Abubakar Sharaf (Ivory Coast)

=== Third place match ===
13 February 2004
20:00

Nigeria	2–1	Mali
Okocha 16'; Odemwingie 52'	Report	Abouta 70'

Mustapha Ben Jannet Stadium, Monastir
Attendance: 2,500
Referee: Modou Sowe (Gambia)

=== Final ===
14 February 2004
14:30

Tunisia	2–1	Morocco
Santos 5'; Jaziri 52'	Report	Mokhtari 38'

7 November Stadium, Tunis
Attendance: 60,000
Referee: Falla N'Doye (Senegal)

== Statistics ==
=== Goalscorers ===
There were 88 goals scored in 32 matches, for an average of 2.75 goals per match.

4 goals

- (Cameroon) Patrick Mboma
- (Mali) Frédéric Kanouté
- (Nigeria) Jay-Jay Okocha
- (Tunisia) Francileudo Santos

3 goals

- (Guinea) Titi Camara
- (Morocco) Youssouf Hadji
- (Morocco) Youssef Mokhtari
- (Nigeria) Peter Odemwingie
- (Zimbabwe) Peter Ndlovu

2 goals

- (Algeria) Hocine Achiou
- (Cameroon) Modeste M'bami
- (Mali) Mahamadou Diarra
- (Morocco) Marouane Chamakh
- (Nigeria) John Utaka
- (Senegal) Mamadou Niang
- (South Africa) Siyabonga Nomvethe
- (Tunisia) Ziad Jaziri
- (Guinea) Pascal Feindouno

1 goal

- (Algeria) Abdelmalek Cherrad
- (Algeria) Maamar Mamouni
- (Algeria) Brahim Zafour
- (Benin) Moussa Latoundji
- (Burkina Faso) Dieudonné Minoungou
- (Cameroon) Samuel Eto'o
- (Democratic Republic of the Congo) Alain Masudi
- (Egypt) Tamer Abdel Hamid
- (Egypt) Mohamed Barakat
- (Egypt) Ahmad Belal
- (Kenya) John Baraza
- (Kenya) Emmanuel Ake
- (Kenya) Titus Mulama
- (Kenya) Dennis Oliech
- (Mali) Sédonoudé Abouta
- (Mali) Soumaïla Coulibaly
- (Mali) Mohamed Sissoko
- (Mali) Dramane Traoré
- (Morocco) Nabil Baha
- (Morocco) Talal El Karkouri
- (Morocco) Abdeslam Ouaddou
- (Morocco) Youssef Safri
- (Morocco) Jaouad Zairi
- (Nigeria) Garba Lawal
- (Nigeria) Joseph Yobo
- (Rwanda) João Elias Manamana
- (Rwanda) Karim Kamanzi
- (Rwanda) Saïd Makasi
- (Senegal) Habib Beye
- (Senegal) Papa Bouba Diop
- (South Africa) Patrick Mayo
- (Tunisia) Khaled Badra
- (Tunisia) Selim Benachour
- (Tunisia) Najeh Braham
- (Tunisia) Jawhar Mnari
- (Zimbabwe) Joel Luphahla
- (Zimbabwe) Adam Ndlovu
- (Zimbabwe) Esrom Nyandoro

1 own goal

- (Benin) Anicet Adjamossi (Against Morocco)

=== Tournament rankings ===
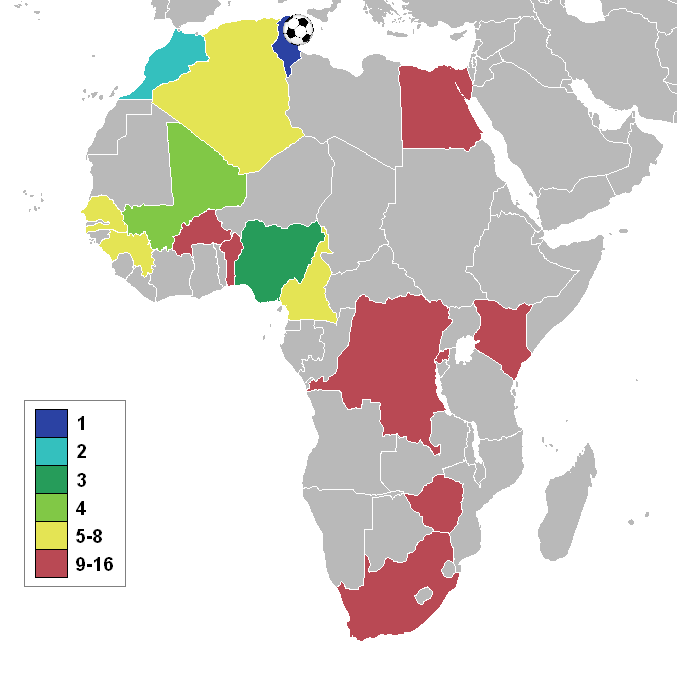
Result of teams participating in 2004 African Cup of Nations: Champion Runner-up Third place / Fourth place Quarter-finals Group stage

Pos	Team	Pld	W	D	L	GF	GA	GD	Pts	Final result
1	Tunisia (H)	6	4	2	0	10	4	+6	14	Champions
2	Morocco	6	4	1	1	14	4	+10	13	Runners-up
3	Nigeria	6	4	1	1	11	5	+6	13	Third place
4	Mali	6	3	1	2	10	10	0	10	
5	Senegal	4	1	2	1	4	2	+2	5	
6	Cameroon	4	1	2	1	7	6	+1	5	
7	Guinea	4	1	1	2	5	5	0	4	
8	Algeria	4	1	1	2	5	7	−2	4	
9	Rwanda	3	1	1	1	3	3	0	4	
10	Egypt	3	1	1	1	3	3	0	4	
11	South Africa	3	1	1	1	3	5	−2	4	
12	Kenya	3	1	0	2	4	6	−2	3	
13	Zimbabwe	3	1	0	2	6	8	−2	3	
14	Burkina Faso	3	0	1	2	1	6	−5	1	
15	DR Congo	3	0	0	3	1	6	−5	0	
16	Benin	3	0	0	3	1	8	−7	0	

Source: RSSSF
(H) Hosts

== Awards ==
The following awards were given at the conclusion of the tournament:

Man of the Competition
(Nigeria) Jay-Jay Okocha
Top scorer
(Tunisia) Francileudo Santos
(4 goals)

=== Team of the Tournament ===
The Confederation of African Football (CAF) selected the best players of the African Cup of Nations as part of the tournament's ideal team. This team was called the Ideal Team of the African Cup of Nations 2004 and consisted of:

Goalkeeper	Defenders	Midfielders	Forwards
(Nigeria) Vincent Enyeama	(Morocco) Walid Regragui (Tunisia) Khaled Badra (Morocco) Abdeslam Ouaddou (Cameroon) Timothée Atouba	(Algeria) Karim Ziani (Tunisia) Riadh Bouazizi (Nigeria) Jay-Jay Okocha (Nigeria) John Utaka	(Mali) Frédéric Kanouté (Morocco) Youssouf Hadji

== Broadcasting ==
Territory	Channel
Tunisia	Tunis 7
France	Canal+
(Arab League) MENA	ART
Sub-Saharan Africa	LC 2 AFNEX

== See also ==
- 2003 Tunis Four Nations Tournament
- 2004 African Women's Championship
- Football in Tunisia
