= Kolindsund =

Drained lake in Denmark

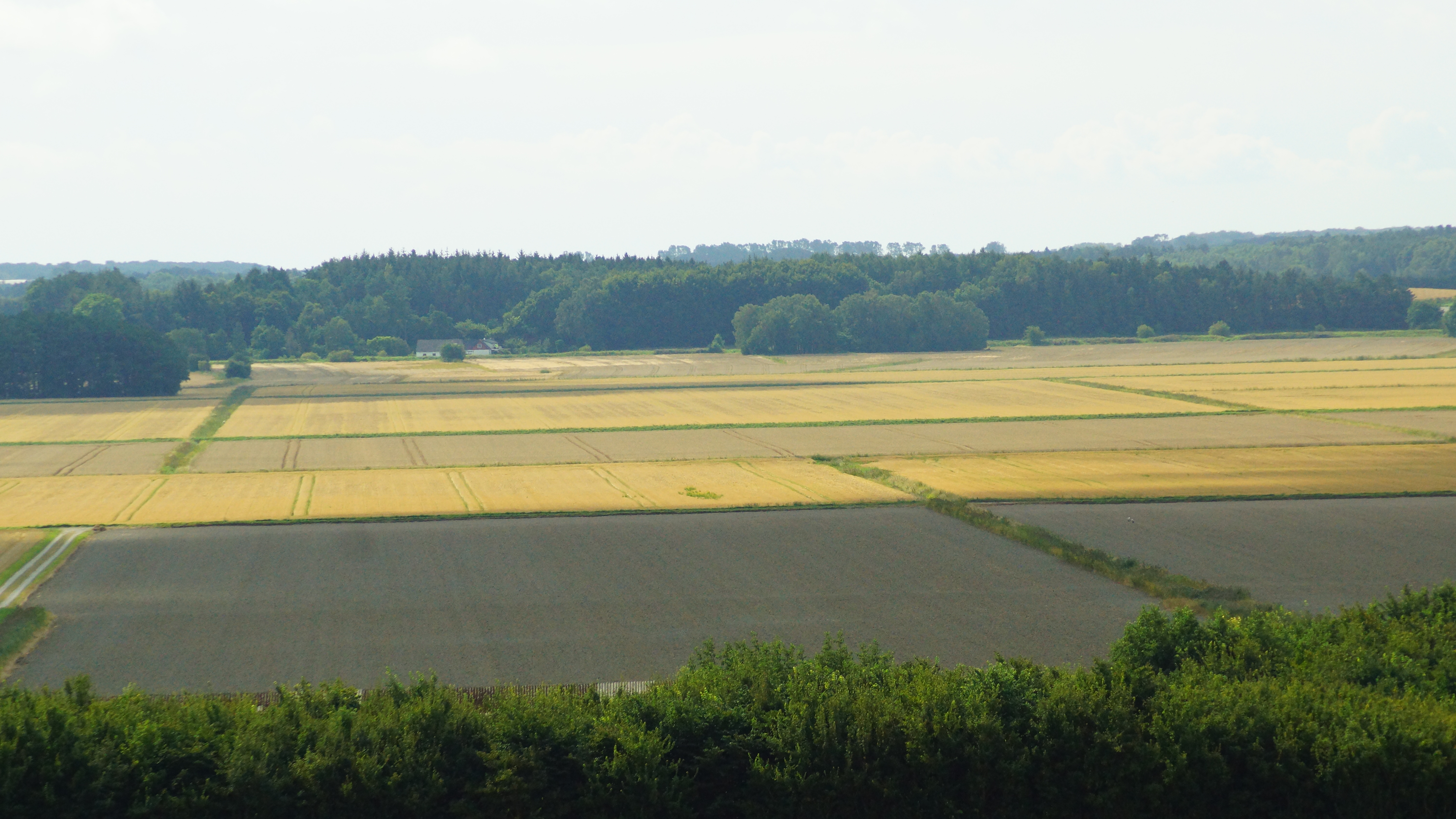
- Former lake bottom of Kolindsund, seen from bordering hills at Skiffard

- Kolindsund in Denmark, Northern Europe
- Location: Djursland, Denmark
- Group: Former lake
- Coordinates: 56°25′00″N 10°44′00″E
- Etymology: Sound of Kolind
- Primary inflows: Ryom Å
- Primary outflows: North Canal and Grenå River
- Surface area: 264 ha (650 acres)
- Average depth: 2.4 m (7 ft 10 in)

Kolindsund (English: Sound of Kolind) is a 26.4-square-kilometer (10.2 sq mi) elongated lakebed on the Djursland peninsula in Denmark. It extends 25 kilometers (16 mi) west, inland from the coastal town of Grenå by the Kattegat sea to the railway town of Kolind at its western end. The former lake was drained through a series of canals, dams, and pumping stations beginning in May 1874. Today, the area is rich farmland kept dry by means of electric pumping stations.

== Geography ==
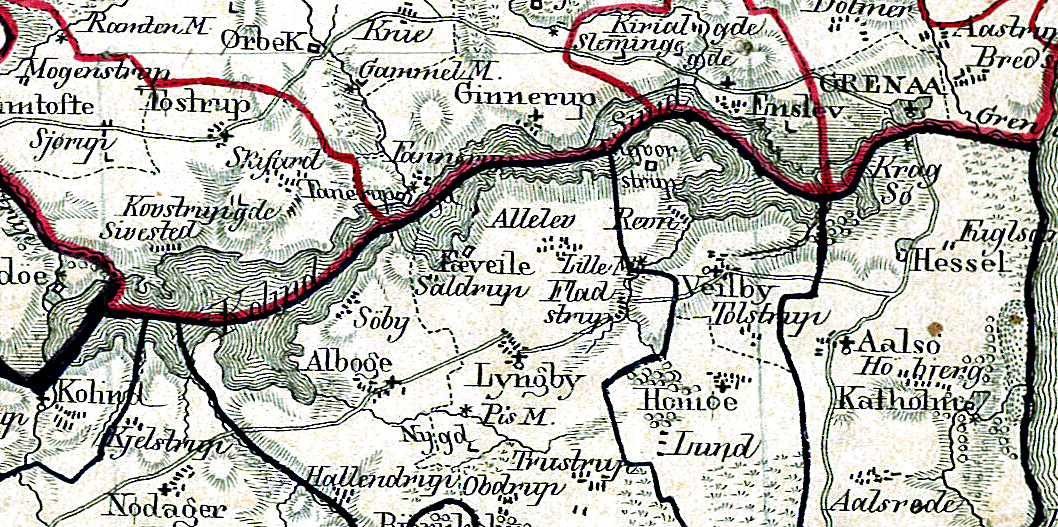
Map of the region from the 1820s, when the Kolinsund was still a Lake.

The sound was formed by a low glacial valley system and is surrounded by cliffs up to 35 meters high. During the Stone Age, Kolindsund was a saltwater sound that separated the Djursland peninsula from the mainland, creating an island. By the Middle Ages, the entrance of the sound had been blocked off near the town of Grenaa, turning the area into a navigable lake, which likely only had a depth of a few meters. This closure was likely caused by wind-driven sand drifts in combination with sea level changes and/or land elevation changes.

Today, the bottom of the drained lake is on average 2.5 meters (8 ft 2 in) below sea level. The width of Kolindsund varies between 0.8 kilometers (0.50 mi) and 2.5 kilometers (1.6 mi). Throughout all of the sound there is a system of drainage pipes which divert water towards the middle canals and then into pumping stations.

The fertile clay-like soil in the sound consists mainly of two types of aquatic deposits, marine and freshwater silt. The marine soil originates from salt water deposits, has a low carbon content, and is up to 40% clay. The freshwater silt has a carbon content up to 5%. These silt and clay deposits were combined with peat-matter to form gyttja.

Today, there is concern that possible future rising sea levels due to climate change might make it more difficult to keep the former lake dry as farmland. In the past few decades, the region has seen an increase in flooding, which has led to frequent crop loss in the neighboring areas not protected by the Kolindsund's pumping system. The sound itself requires increasingly drastic improvements to prevent it from reverting into a lake, as the drying out of the areas soils has caused the surface level to sink further below sea level, which may eventually make the project unviable. There is ongoing discussion about restoring the area to its natural state.

== History ==
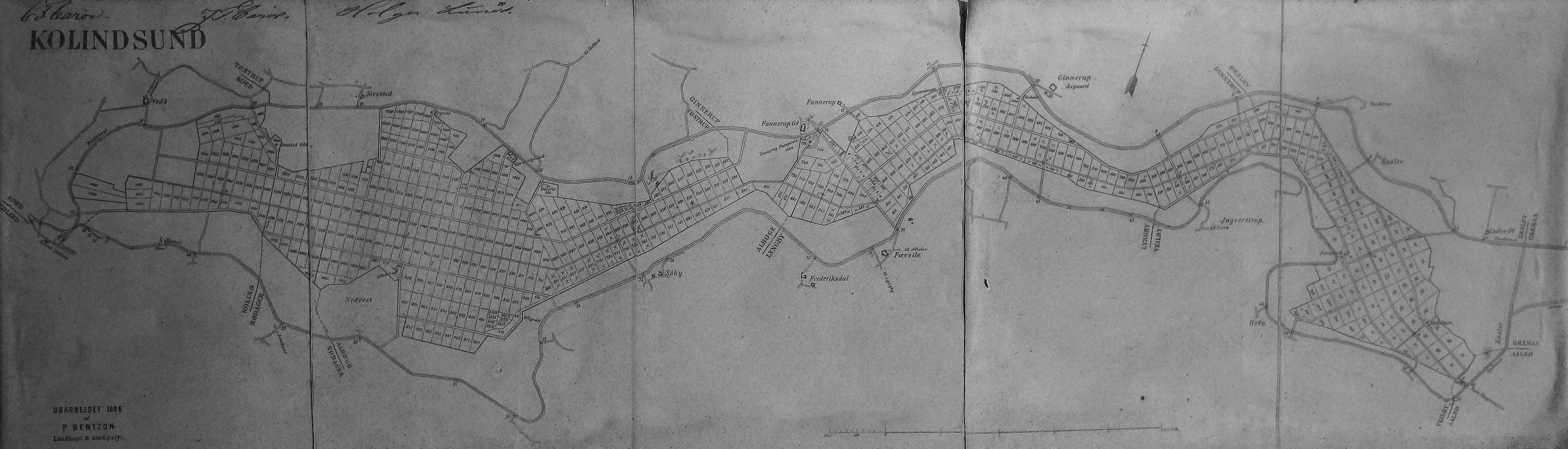
Historical field map from 1886, showing the partitions of the newly created farmland.

Between 1872 and 1880, a project was carried out to drain the lake, converting the area into farmland. A shareholder company, Aktieselskabet Kolindsund, oversaw the lake drainage project and the cultivation the former lake bed during the 19th century, having financed a number of drainage canals along with two pumping stations in order to drain the lake. Canals were dug on the north and south sides of the sound, with a third main channel dug through the center of the old lakebed. These drainage canals were excavated by hand, with picks, shovels, and wheelbarrows.

Two pumping stations were initially constructed, both powered by steam engines and windmills until the 1930s. When the pumps started draining the lake in May 1874, the water level reportedly sank 1.3 centimeters (0.51 in) per day, eventually creating 2,800 ha of new farmland. Initially, the shareholder company which oversaw the project had only planned to drain the western part of the lake, and had attempted to construct a dam near the village of Fannerup in order to separate the lake into two sections. It is said that the 800-meter (2,600 ft) dam they constructed simply sank into the mud. As a result, the projected eventually drained the entire lake instead.

After the lake had been drained, farming of the lakebed begin in the 1880s and 1890s. In the first decades after the lake was drained, the farmland was not particularly profitable and the shareholders which had invested in the project saw limited returns. It was not until 1912 that the project made a profitable margin. In 1921, the land and all of its infrastructure were sold off by the shareholder company to private owners.

== Pumping ==
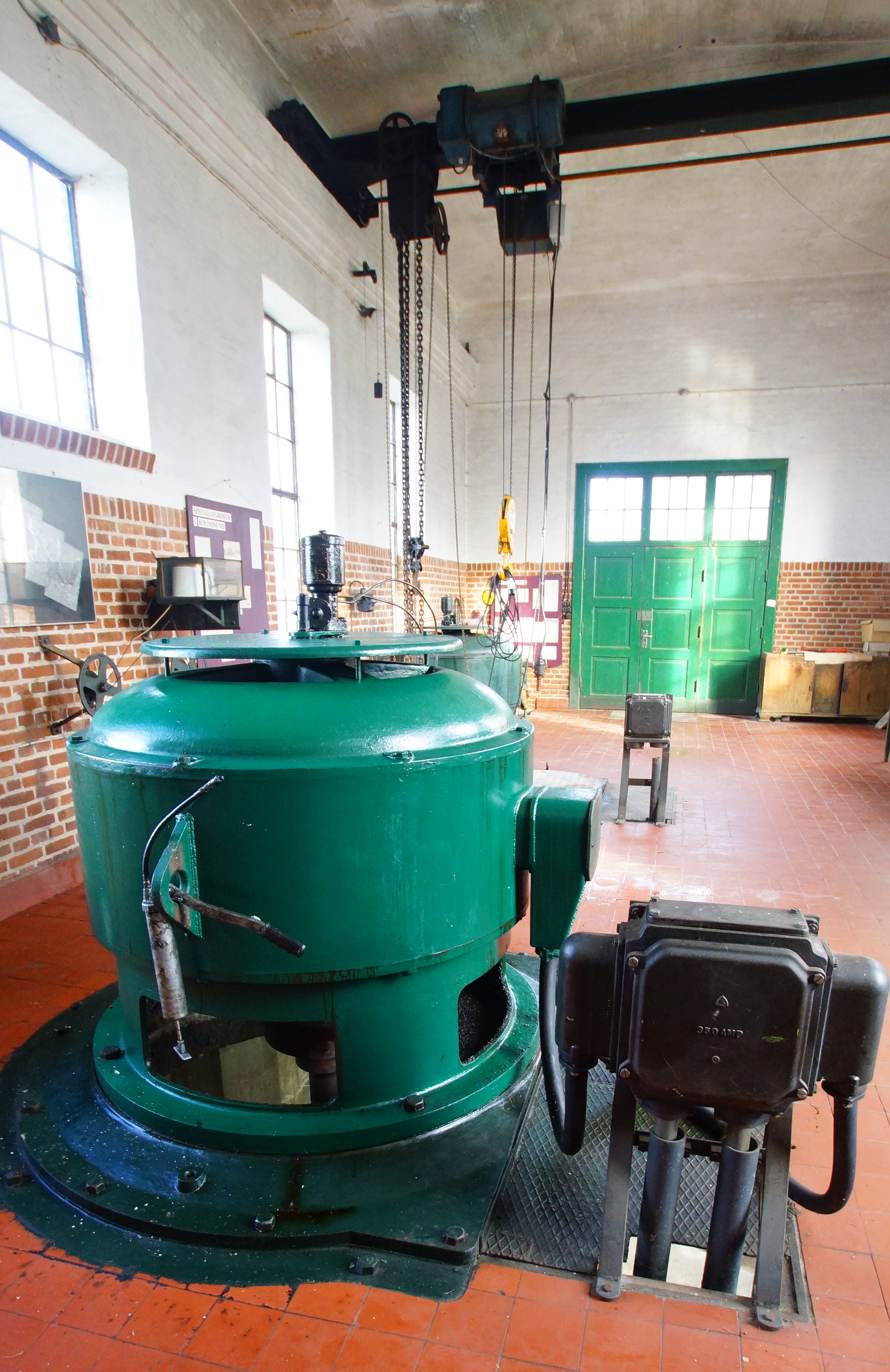
One of two 240-hp electrical motors that drive the pumps keeping the sound from flooding.

During project planning prior to drainage of the lake in the 1870s, the amount of water that had to be pumped out to keep the lake dry was erroneously calculated to be less than half the actual pumping needed. The figure was based on the calculated influx from rainfall over the given area. In reality groundwater from the surrounding hills has a tendency to run under the cut-off canals and into the former lake, often surfacing as wellsprings that formed bogs, causing problems for farming. This extra amount of water meant that the pumping capacity was insufficient in the first decades after drainage of the lake. As a result, large parts of the sound were marshy fields that were too wet for plowing and growing of more intensive grain-based crops, and only suitable for grazing in summer.

By the late 1920s, the pumping infrastructure was in need of repair, and an agricultural-economic crisis jeopardized the viability of the project continuing. On 2 May 1932, the Danish Parliament intervened, passing Law No. 139 which issuing loans and aimed to maintain the Kolindsund as farmland. The legislation also officially recognized the rights of the unionized workers who were involved in the labor-intensive farming of the sound. The Pumpelaget Kolindsund, a landowners' association which still exists, officially designated to oversee the pump and canal infrastructure.

Between 1935 and 1938, the ageing wind and steam pumps were replaced by two electrically driven pumping stations which are still in use today. At the same time, the canals' dams were reenforced. The renovations of the 1930s increased the efficiency of the pumping infrastructure. The water table of the area was lowered, turning even the marshy areas of the sound into high-yield and stable farmland, which is still the case today.

Today, the two 240-horsepower pumps located in the villages of Fannerup and Enslev are turned on as needed, regulated by the water level in the canals that feed water to the pumps. The Fannerup station drains the western end of the sound, while the Enslev station drains the east; both stations pump the excess water into the northern canal, from which it runs into the Kattegat near Grenå. A third pumping station was constructed more recently which drains the middle of the sound and pumps the excess water into the southern canal.

== Farming ==
Farming in Kolindsund does not require expensive and energy consuming irrigation even in the driest of summers, which is otherwise widespread in Denmark. However, the energy must be expended to keep the drainage pumps running year round in the sound.

The high yields of Kolindsund are in part based on the nutrient-rich silt-based soil, deposited through millennia at the bottom of the former lake and sound in layers that are up to 20 meters thick. The soil is free of stones and rocks. In some places the fields are colored with white streaks of prehistoric banks of oyster and mussel shell that have been ploughed up, giving witness to the marine past of Kolindsund.

A similar type of drained sound and lake farmland in Denmark with mussel-rich soil can be seen in the Lammefjord located on the northern part of Denmark's largest island, Zealand. Lammefjorden was also pumped dry in the 1870s. Here vegetables, not least carrots, are established crops. This is not the case in Kolindsund, even though the potential might be there due to the same types of soil.

Grains, cereals, and rapeseed are among the most commonly cultivated crops in the sound, though smaller quantities of spinach, beets, poppy seeds, and caraways seeds are also grown. The region typically produces more than 100 hkg/ha of wheat.

== Gallery ==
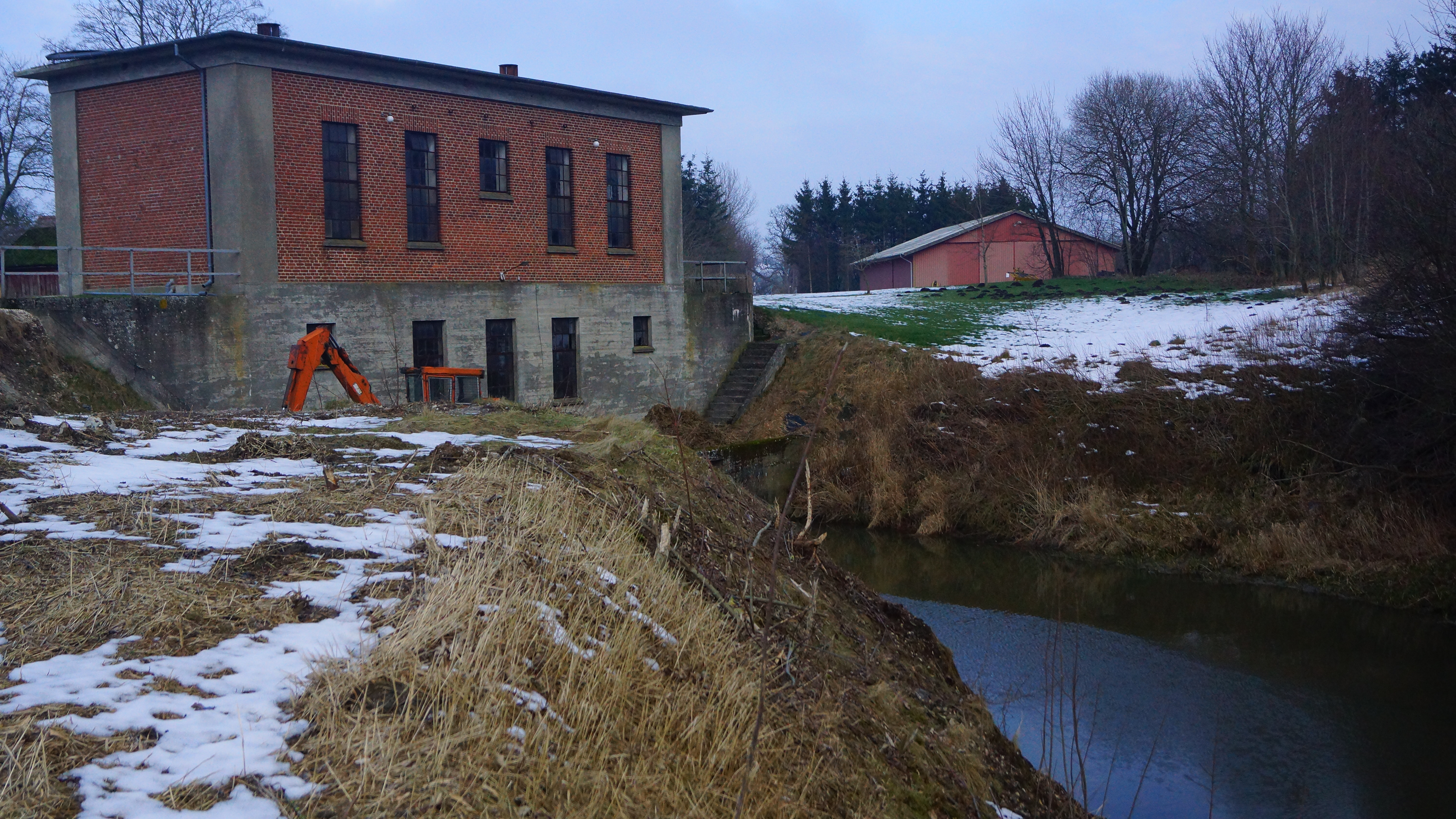
The pumping station in Fannerup, built in the 1930s.

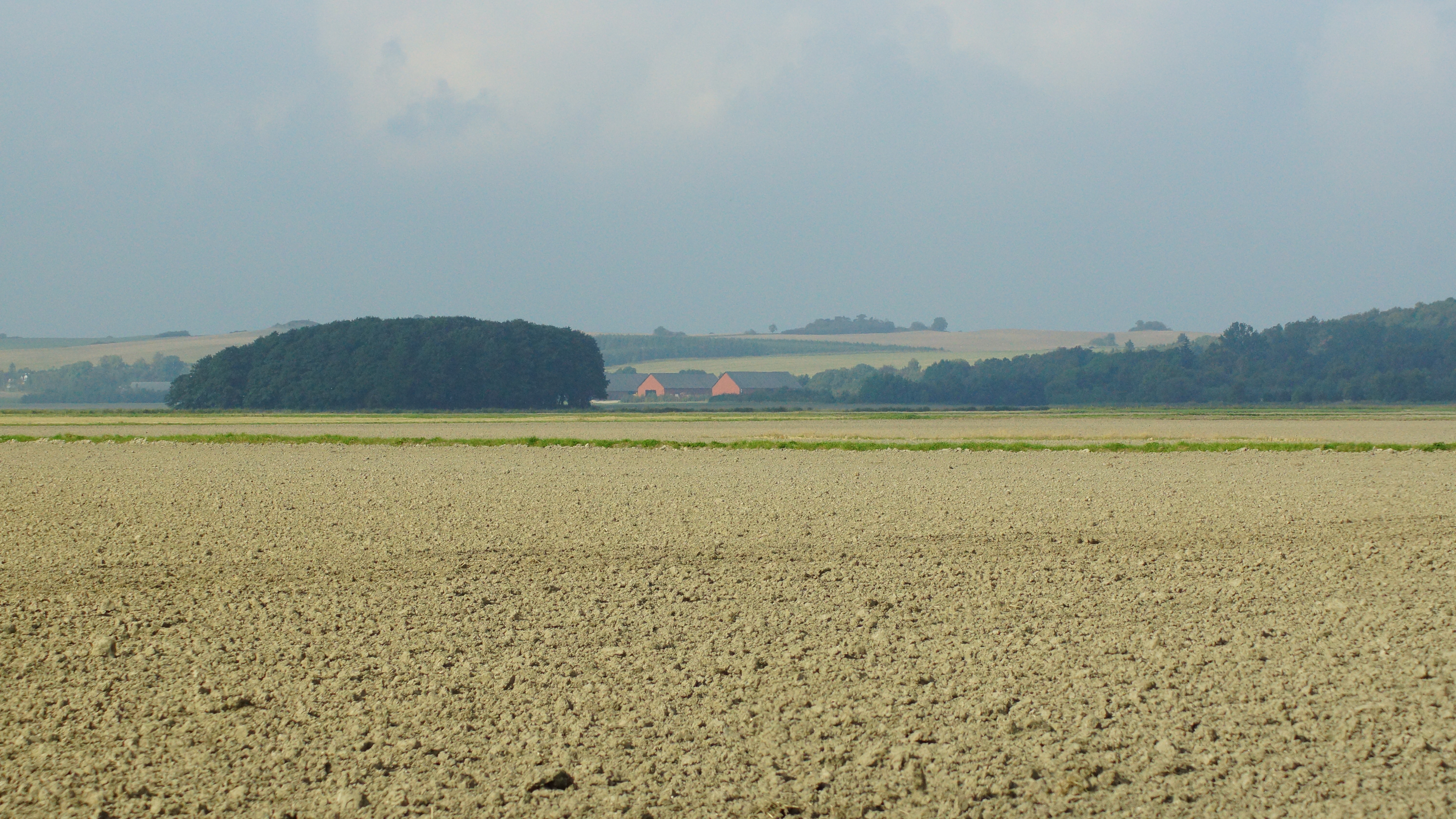
The central part of Kolindsund lies about 2.4 meters (7 ft 10 in) below sea level on average, and is fertile farmland.

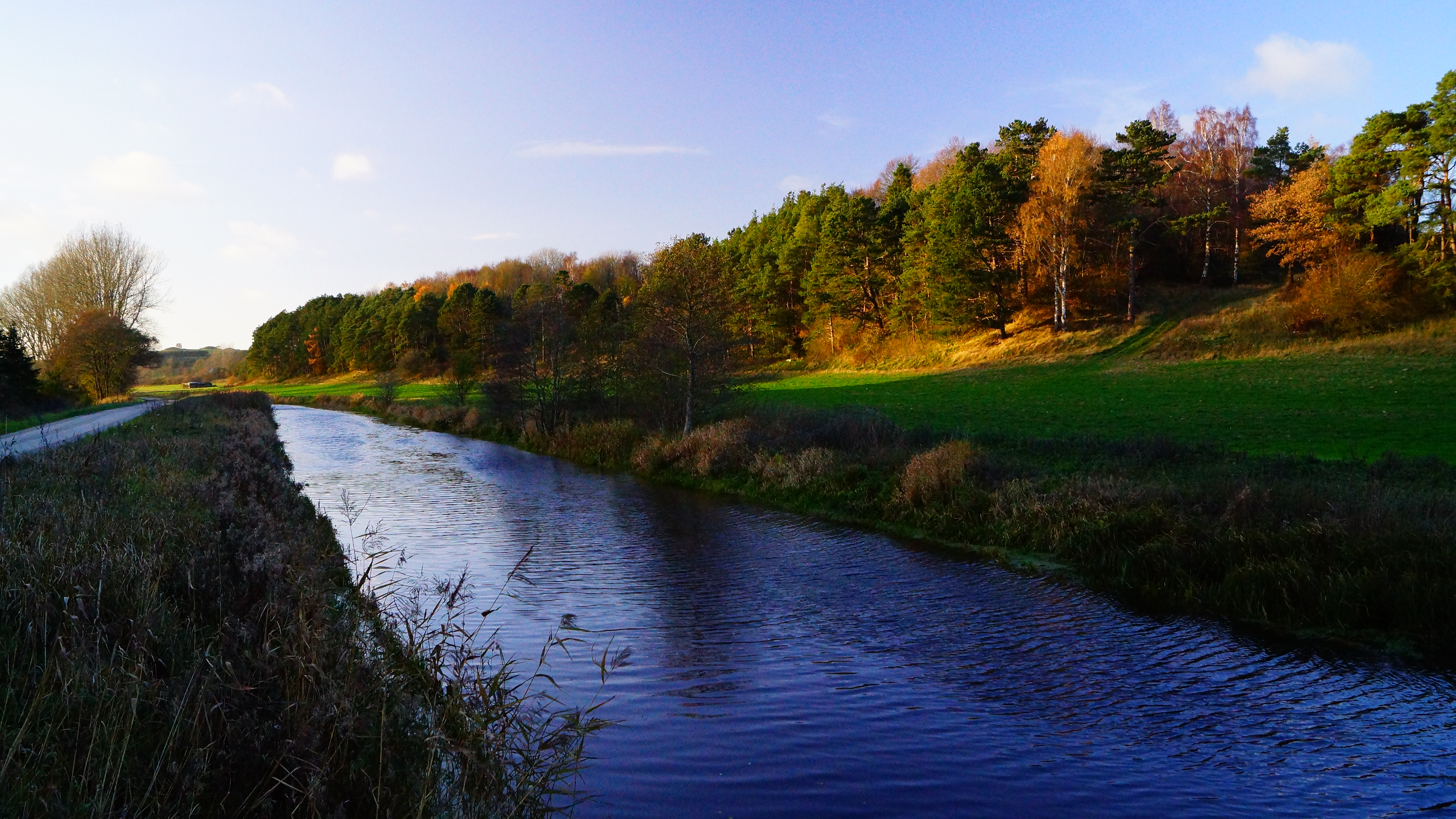
The North Canal down from Skiffard. Together with the South Canal the two canals cut of the streams that would otherwise fill Kolindsund with water. A third canal, the Middle Canal, connects to two pumping stations to the North Canal.

== Literature ==
- Hansen, Finn (1969). Kolindsund: en landbrugsgeografisk analyse (in Danish). University of Aarhus. OCLC 985360953.
- Flou, Britta; Kjær, Børge; Thorndahl, Jytte (1980). Kolindsund: et stykke Djursland fortæller danmarkshistorie (in Danish) (1st ed.). Grenå: P. S. Johnsen. ISBN 9788787629157.
