= Coast Stars F.C. =

Kenyan football club

Coast Stars
- Full name: Coast Stars
- Founded: 1998; 27 years ago
- Ground: Mombasa Municipal Stadium; Mombasa, Kenya
- Capacity: 10,000
Home colours

Coast Stars is a Kenyan football club based in Mombasa. The club was founded in 1998. They are a member of the top division in Kenyan football. Their home stadium is Mombasa Municipal Stadium. They played the 2004/05 season under the name Dubai Bank Limited Club after their sponsors Dubai Bank. The original name was reverted to in the next season. One of the players that has moved to Europe from Coast Stars is Emmanuel Ake.

== Performance in CAF competitions ==
- CAF Cup Winners' Cup: 1 appearance

2000 – First Round
