= Iddi Alkhag =

Danish footballer (born 1978)

Personal information
- Full name: Iddi Leif Deleuran Alkhag
- Date of birth: 6 August 1978 (age 48)
- Place of birth: Esbjerg, Denmark
- Position: Forward

Senior career*
Years	Team	Apps	(Gls)
1993–2001	Esbjerg fB	89	(38)
2001–2007	Silkeborg	118	(37)
2001–2002	→ Fredericia (loan)	8	(2)
2007–2008	Frem	3	(0)
2008	HK Kópavogs	18	(5)
2008–2009	Fredericia	0	(0)
2009–2011	Agrotikos Asteras		
2011	Hobro		
2012–2013	Djursland		

International career
1998	Denmark U20	1	(0)
1998–1999	Denmark U21	14	(1)
- * Club domestic league appearances and goals

Iddi Leif Deleuran Alkhag (born 17 August 1978) is a Danish former footballer of Tanzanian descent. He has previously played for Esbjerg fB, Silkeborg IF, FC Fredericia, and BK Frem in Denmark, as well as Icelandic club HK. He has played 14 games and scored one goal for the Denmark national under-21 football team.
