= Emmanuel Ake =

Kenyan footballer (born 1980)

Personal information
- Full name: Emmanuel Ake Richard Muttendango
- Date of birth: 11 June 1980 (age 46)
- Place of birth: Mombasa, Kenya
- Height: 1.76 m (5 ft 9 in)
- Position: Forward

Youth career
- Black Panther
- Coast Stars

Senior career*
Years	Team	Apps	(Gls)
2000–2004	AB	45	(3)
2004–2008	Nordsjælland	14	(0)
2006	→ Ølstykke (loan)	15	(1)
2006–2007	→ Holbæk B&I (loan)	22	(9)
2007–2008	→ HIK (loan)	41	(25)
2008–2009	Herfølge	23	(17)
2009–2010	HB Køge	13	(5)
2010–2011	Lyngby Boldklub	1	(0)
2011	Næstved Boldklub	10	(4)
2012	Svebølle B&I	0	(0)
2012–2013	FC Djursland	0	(0)

International career^{‡}
2004–	Kenya	8	(1)
- * Club domestic league appearances and goals as of 3 November 2011 (UTC) ‡ National team caps and goals as of 3 November 2011 (UTC)

Emmanuel Ake Richard Muttendango (born 11 June 1980 in Mombasa) is a Kenyan former footballer of Seychellois ancestry. Ake played as a forward. He has spent the past ten seasons playing for different clubs in Denmark.

== False name and birth date ==
Emannuel Ake entered Europe with a temporarily visa because of the fact he had to play a testmatch in the Netherlands. When this turned out wrong for him, he left the Netherlands all of a sudden to go to his father in Denmark without a regular Visa. When Ake first came to Denmark in 2000, he identified himself as "Ali Rajab Akida", or just "Ali Akida", born 20 December 1982. It was later discovered that the information was incorrect and that his real name was Emmanuel Ake Richard Muttendango, born 11 June 1980. Ake was subsequently fined 7,000 DKK by the Gladsaxe City Court. After a number of rulings and subsequent appeals from the involved parties, the Sports Confederation of Denmark (DIF) suspended Ake for three months.

Ake's club at the time, Akademisk Boldklub, was also awarded a 50,000 DKK fine, and all the points AB's first and reserve teams had collected in matches in which Ake had participated were lost.

== Club career ==
=== Early career ===
Ake's mother is from Kenya, and his father from Seychelles. His parents divorced and his father moved to Denmark. He started his senior career with Black Panther in the Coast Provincial League (3rd level in Kenya). He then moved to Mombasa-based Coast Stars in the Kenyan Premier League. A Dutch tourist and his son met his mother in Kenya and found out about his football-skills. In Kenya he wouldn't be able to get a living out of playing football. The Dutchman tried to give him a future and arranged a temporarily visa for Ake and invited him over to the Netherlands, to stay with them and to play a test match with FC Oss (second division of the Netherlands) (team formerly known as TOP Oss). After the unsuccessful trials he left the guest-family and travelled to his father in Denmark.

=== Denmark ===
As a 20-year-old, Ake was signed by Akademisk Boldklub, where he spent four seasons from 2000 to 2004. He then moved to FC Nordsjælland for the 2004–05 and 2005–06 seasons.

Ake was loaned out by FC Nordsjælland for the second half of the 2005–06 season to Ølstykke FC. He was the club's top scorer with 14 goals. In the next seasons, Ake was loaned to second-division side Holbæk B&I, where he also emerged as the club's top scorer with 11 goals.

In the 2007–08 season, Ake was on loan, this time to First Division side Hellerup IK (HIK). He scored 13 league goals, tops on the club, but the team was still relegated to Division 2.

Ake then signed a three-year contract with Herfølge Boldklub. He joined the club after he was declared a free agent by FC Nordsjælland.

=== HB Køge ===
Ake was a part of the new HB Køge team, founded in 2009 after a merger between Herfølge and Køge Boldklub. The new season started very well for Ake, who scored five goals in 13 league matches. However, he was severely injured in November 2009, rupturing his achilles tendon. Ake inspired a lot of people at HB Koge including the well known Will Holmes.

=== Lyngby BK ===
In September 2010 he signed with Lyngby Boldklub.

=== Næstved BK ===
In February 2011 he signed an amateur contract with Næstved Boldklub. He left the club in the summer of 2011.

=== Svebølle B&I ===
On 1 February 2012 he agreed to play at Danish 2nd Division club Svebølle B&I, because the club was managed by his old teammate from Holbæk B&I, Erdogan Aslan. Unfortunately this story came with a rough ending because of the fact Ake was denied a working permit for Denmark and was forced to leave the country only a month after signing with Svebølle.

=== FC Djursland ===
In September 2012 he returned to Denmark to play for FC Djursland in Danmarksserien, the fourth tier of the Danish football system.

== International career ==
Ake was part of the Kenyan National team, the Harambee Stars, at the Tunisia 2004 African Cup of Nations. He made three appearances for the Harambee Stars. He scored the third goal against Burkina Faso, earning Kenya its first-ever win at the Nations Cup.
