= Anicet Adjamossi =

Beninese footballer (born 1984)

Personal information
- Full name: Anicet Kayodé Adjamossi
- Date of birth: 15 March 1984 (age 42)
- Place of birth: Porto-Novo, Benin
- Height: 1.76 m (5 ft 9 in)
- Position: Defender

Youth career
- 2001–2004: Bordeaux

Senior career*
Years	Team	Apps	(Gls)
2004–2005	Pau FC	28	(2)
2005–2006	L'Entente SSG	27	(1)
2006–2007	Istres	11	(1)
2007–2008	US Créteil	25	(0)
2008–2009	Racing Ferrol	10	(0)
2009–2010	Mogas 90 FC		
2010	MFK Topoľčany		
2010–2015	Saint-Colomban Locminé		
2015–2017	La Vitréenne		

International career
2002–2013	Benin	48	(5)
- * Club domestic league appearances and goals

Anicet Kayodé Adjamossi (born 15 March 1984) is a Beninese former professional footballer who played as a defender.

== International career ==
Adjamossi was part of the Benin national team at the 2004 African Nations Cup which finished bottom of their group in the first round of competition, thus failing to secure qualification for the quarter-finals.
