= João Elias Manamana =

Rwandan footballer

Personal information
- Full name: João Henriette Rafael Elias Manamana
- Date of birth: 12 December 1973 (age 52)
- Place of birth: Cabinda, Angola
- Height: 1.75 m (5 ft 9 in)
- Position: Midfielder

Senior career*
Years	Team	Apps	(Gls)
1992–1993	Beerschot		
1994–1996	AC Hemptinne-Eghezée		
1996–2003	K.V. Mechelen		
2003–2004	K.V. Kortrijk		
2005	APR F.C.		
2005–2006	R.R.F.C. Montegnée		
2006–2007	O.F. Ierapetra		
2007	La Louvière		
2007–2008	RJS Bas-Oha		

International career
2003–2005	Rwanda	11	(2)
- * Club domestic league appearances and goals

João Elias Manamana (born 12 December 1973) is a Rwandan former professional footballer who played as a midfielder. He was capped for the Rwanda national football team and played at the 2004 African Cup of Nations.
