= Djursland =

Peninsula in Denmark

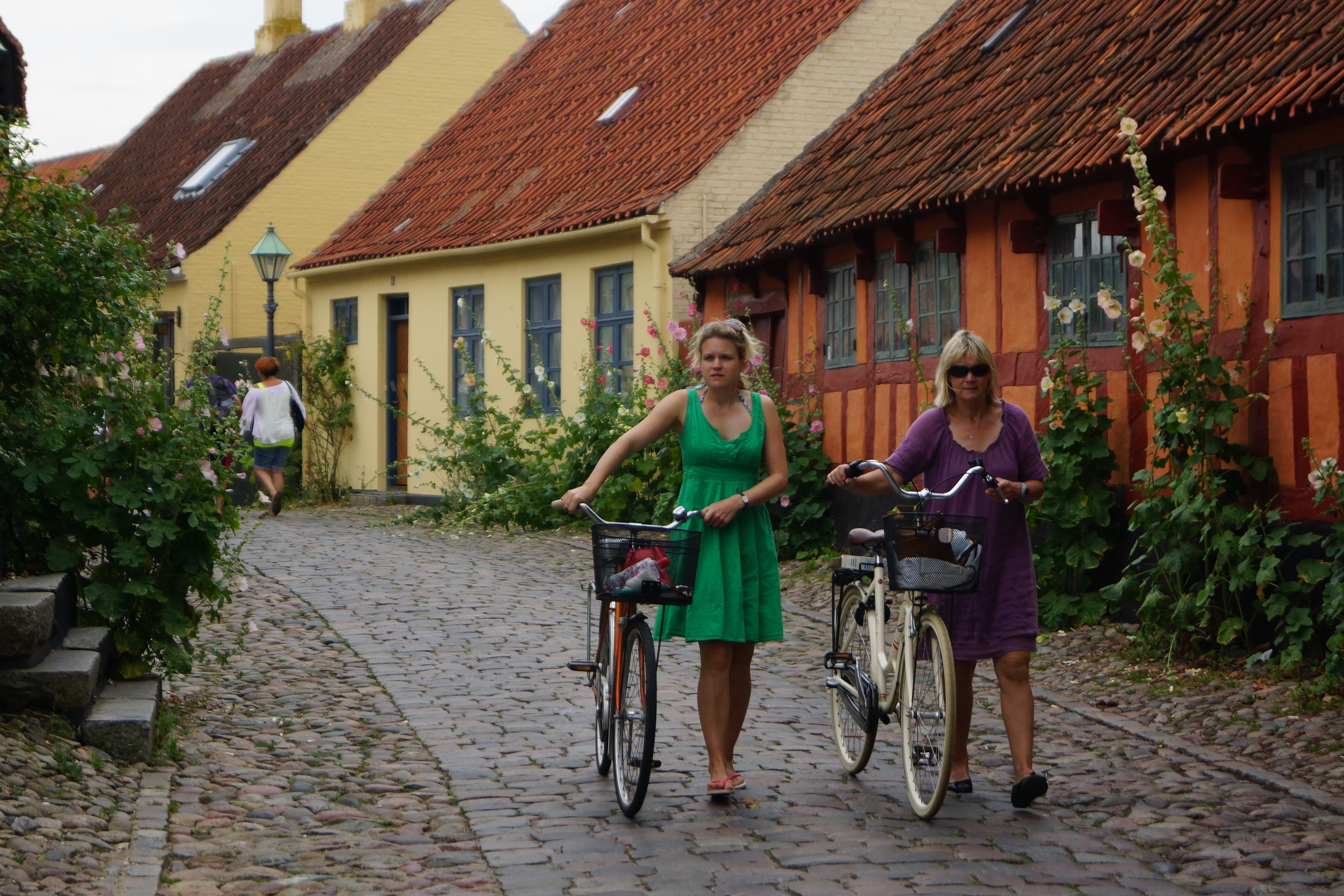
- Djursland: Historical city centre of Ebeltoft

- Location within Denmark
- Location: Syddjurs Municipality
- Coordinates: 56°24′N 10°38′E
- Area: 1,417 km^{2} (547 sq mi)

Djursland (Danish pronunciation: [ˈtjuɐ̯ˀsˌlænˀ]) is a 1,417 km^{2} (547 sq mi) hilly lowland peninsula in Denmark at the entrance to the Baltic Sea, between Denmark and Sweden in Northern Europe. Djursland protrudes into the Kattegat sea, as part of the larger peninsula of Jutland, which itself extends from the Central European continent. Djursland comprises the two municipalities of Norddjurs and Syddjurs.

The only larger city on Djursland is Grenå, but both Randers and Aarhus are close-by. Agriculture and fishing has been the mainstay of the rural culture here for millennia. There are many prehistoric relics of the past on Djursland, reaching back to the earliest cultures of the Nordic Stone Age.

Djursland is a popular place for recreation in the summer and has several activities for tourists to offer. It attracts both Danes and foreigners alike and tourism is a major job and economic contributor on Djursland nowadays.

Since 2009, a larger area of Djursland has been part of Mols Bjerge National Park, connecting several previously disconnected protections.

== Climate ==
Djursland has a mild, temperate coastal climate, influenced by the North Atlantic Current. Westerly and southwesterly winds prevail. The yearly precipitation is 700 mm (28 in), making Djursland well suited for agriculture, like the rest of Denmark. The average summer temperature is 16 degrees Celsius (61 °F). The coldest month is January with an average temperature of 0.5 °C (32.9 °F). The predominant crops are barley, wheat, canola, and in recent years corn, growing at its northern range, even though the average temperature has fallen 0.2 °C (0.36 °F) over the last 60 years in Denmark. A little over 10% of Djursland is covered with forest (plantations) and the most common trees are Norway spruce, Scots pine and beech.

== Population ==
The population density of Djursland is 42 inhabitants per square kilometre (110/sq mi), compared to 126/km^{2} (330/sq mi) for Denmark as a whole. Neighboring Germany to the south has 230 inhabitants per square kilometre (600/sq mi), England to the west 407/km^{2} (1,050/sq mi), and Sweden to the east of Denmark 21/km^{2} (54/sq mi). Denmark has 5.6 million inhabitants, of whom 80,000 live in Djursland.

== Landscape ==
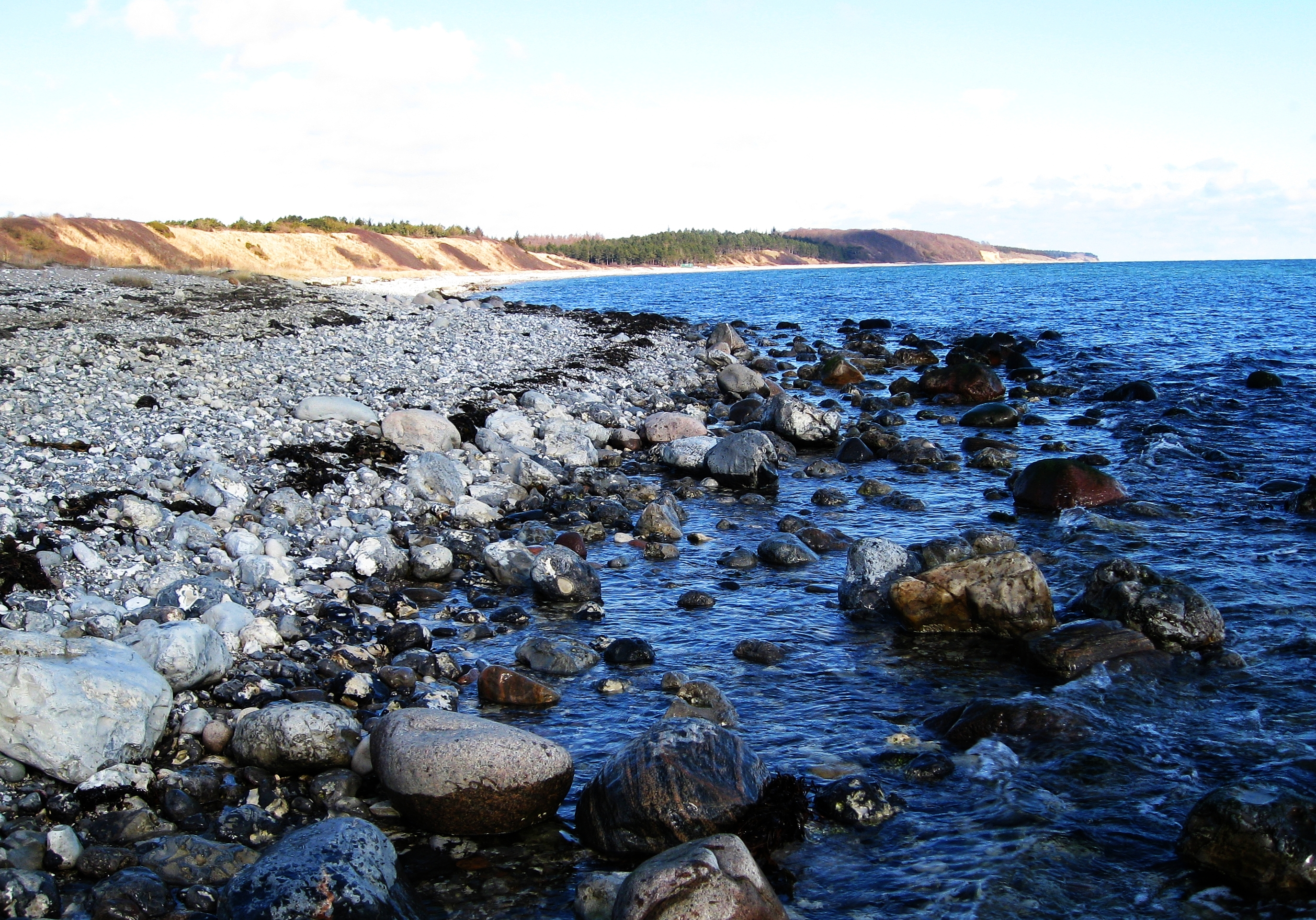
Djursland's 50 km eastern coastline is stony, open and walkable

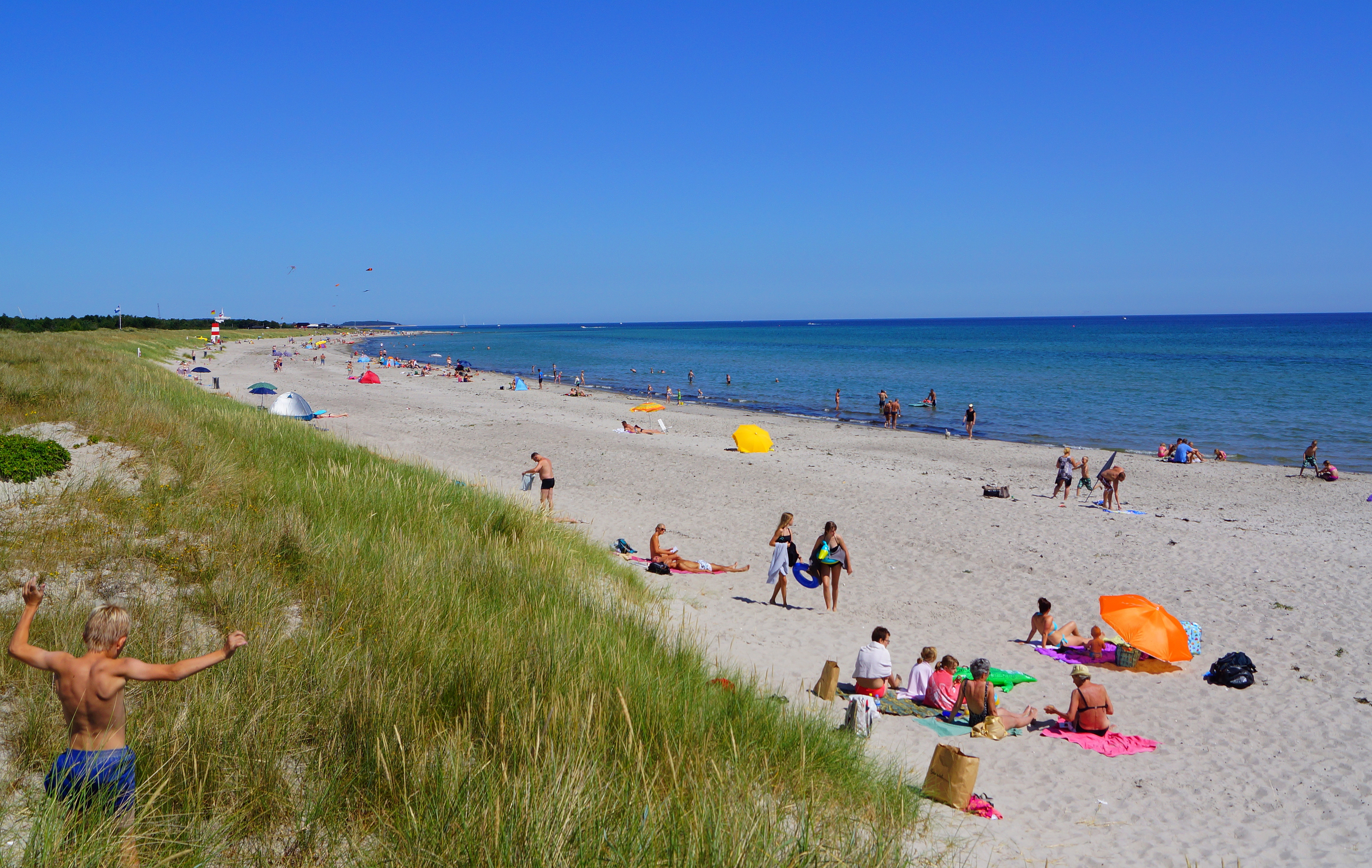
Grenå Beach

Even on hilly Djursland, only a few of the hills rise above 70 metres (230 ft) above sea level and none higher than 140 metres (460 ft). As in the rest of Denmark, excluding the remote island of Bornholm, there is no surface bedrock - neither above nor below the sea -, as Djursland's landscapes were formed by complex and non-uniform glacial movements with related meltwater flows, in the span of the last three ice ages.

Coastlines: Djursland is surrounded by sea on three sides, and has three corresponding distinct types of coastline. Variation is a common denominator for Djursland's coastal geography, as well as the inland geography.

- North Coast - The 35-kilometre (22 mi) northern coastline of Djursland comprises all-sand beaches with shallow waters throughout. It stretches east from a shallow delta-like marshy coast where the outlet of Denmark's largest river, the Gudenå, enters Randers Fjord and the sea. The north coast beaches are child-friendly for bathing and paddling, while swimming depths are reached about a hundred metres from the shores. The shallow water heats up quickly in summer. Fishing for flatfish is good, but it takes a boat to reach sufficient fishing depth.
- East Coast - The 50-kilometre (30 mi) coastline facing Sweden (approximately 100 km (60 mi) to the east across the Kattegat) is stony. The east coast has sufficient swimming depth close to the shore within 5–20 metres (15–65 ft) from land. The east coast is known among anglers and scuba divers. There are two major exceptions to the stony coastline. One is at the Cliffs of Sangstrup and Karlby where a 5-kilometre (3 mi) stretch of coast consists of up to 12-metre-high (39 ft) limestone cliffs, similar to the Cliffs of Dover but on a smaller scale. The second exception is Grenå Beach, a sandy 5 km (3 mi) long beach with dunes. The beach lies by the coastal town, Grenå, and is a popular bathing beach. Here and there on Djursland's eastern coast, there are steep inclines caused by active coastal erosion, such as at Gjerrild and Rugaard.
- South Coast - The southern coastline of Djursland is dominated by bights and inlets, with varied stony and sandy stretches and mixed depth gradients. It is always possible to find bights and coves in shelter for any wind direction within a short driving distance. There are a number of sandy bathing beaches here.

The tide is moderate around Djursland, with a difference between ebb and flow usually less than 30 centimetres (12 in).

== Central Djursland ==
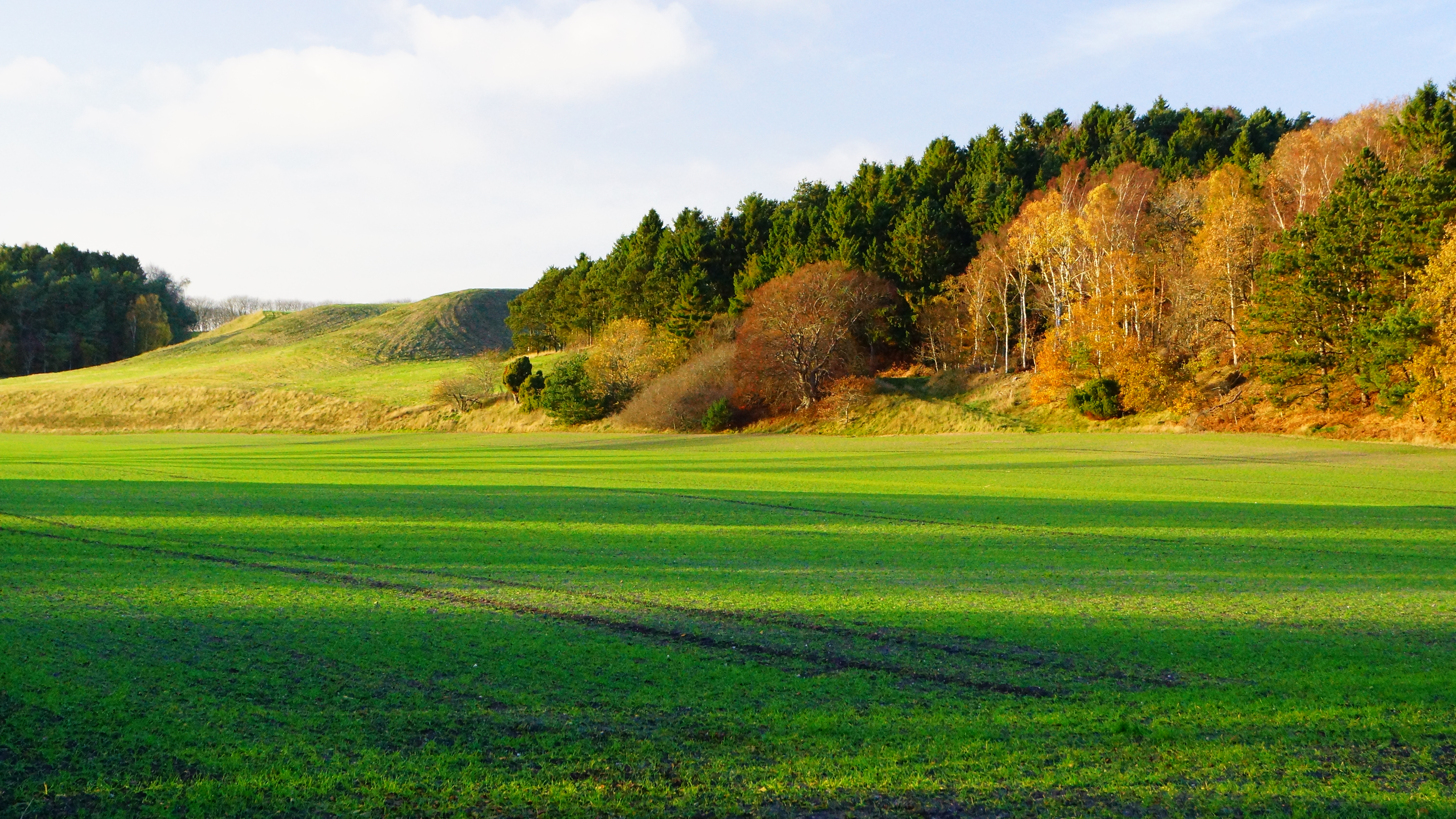
Border hills at Kolind Sound

The Kolindsund or Sound of Kolind is a dried-out lake that stretches 30 km (19 mi) east–west into central Djursland. The area was a lake until 1870, and a saltwater sound until the Middle Ages, making it possible to sail into central Djursland. Sand drift closed the estuary to the sea, Kattegat.

The lakebed is fertile farmland with constant high yields of wheat and grass seed. The northern side of the sound is flanked by 25 km (16 mi) of border hills down to the lakebed contributing to the characteristics of the landscape.

The sound is drained by two pumping stations lifting the water up into a Northern Canal which flows into a river that runs through the centre of the town, Grenå, before entering the sea, between Grenå’s marina and seaport. Kolind Sound lies 2 metres (7 ft) below sea level, while the pumping elevation at the pumping stations is 5 metres (16 ft). The sound is flanked by canals that are popular among anglers. Sea trout is a particularly common catch, as are pike, perch and bream.

== Southern Djursland ==
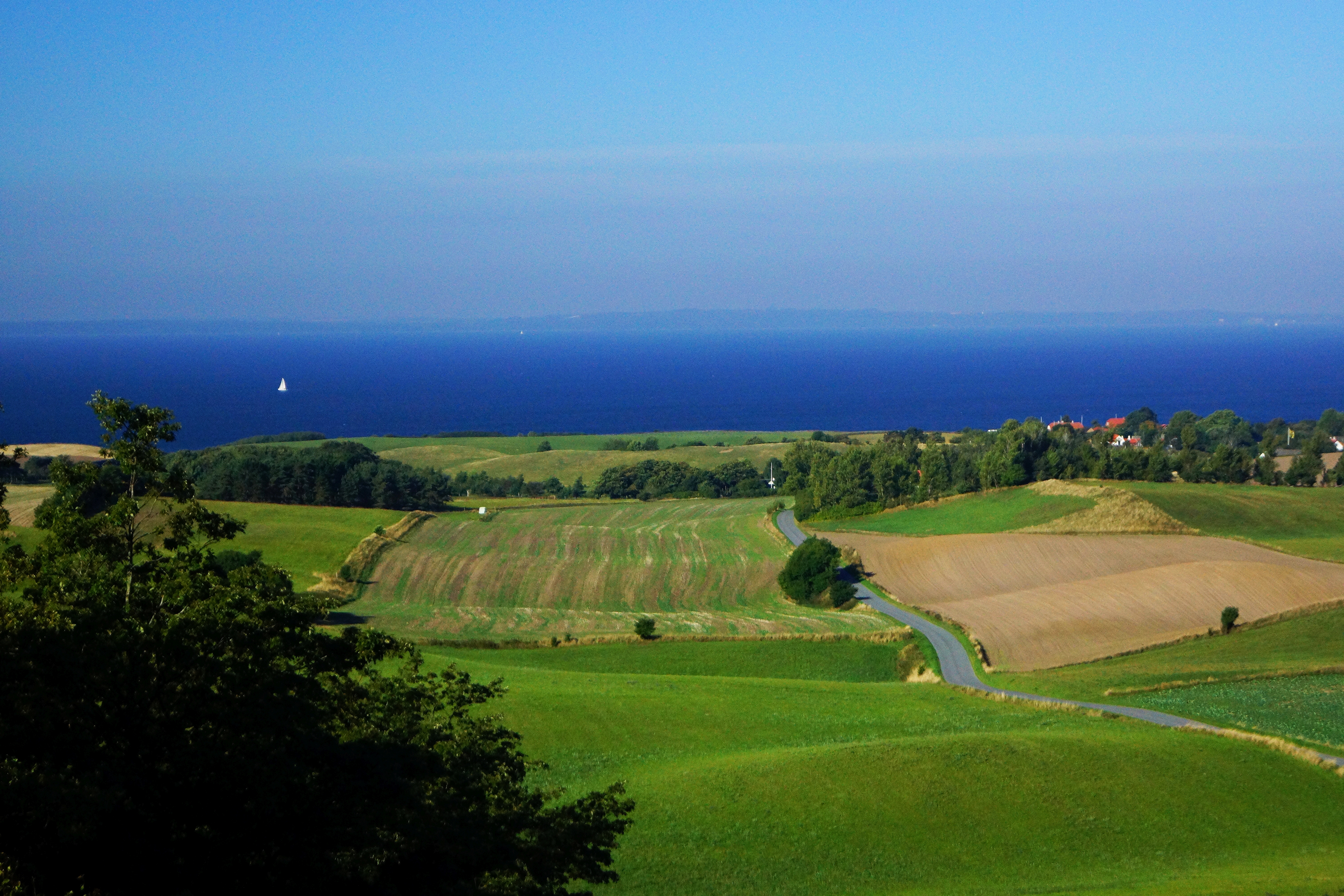
View of Ellemandsbjerg in southern Djursland

South of Kolind Sound lies a sandy ice-age floodplain housing Djursland's airport, Aarhus Airport, which serves Denmark's second largest city, Aarhus (pop. 319,094), 41 km (25 mi) southwest of the airport.

Mols: Going further south one enters an area with the most abrupt hills in Djursland, the Mols Bjerge, ending at the bights and inlets of southern Djursland.

Mols contains Mols Bjerge National Park, which includes coastlines, parts of seabed, the town of Ebeltoft, and a hilly non-farmed landscape with views over the bights and inlets of southern Djursland. The non-farming part of the park is maintained as an open post-ice-age landscape. This is done by grazing and cutting down excessive tree growth that would otherwise cause natural, and dense, forestation, obstructing views and accessibility. The national park was established in 2009, mostly on privately owned land. Establishing the park did not involve buying or expropriating land, but an intention to strengthen information about nature-related issues in the area, and to widen use and access to the park.

The main bays, bights and coves on southern Djursland are the Bay of Aarhus, the Bight of Begtrup, the Bight of Knebel, the Bight of Egens and the Bight of Ebeltoft.

== Northern Djursland ==
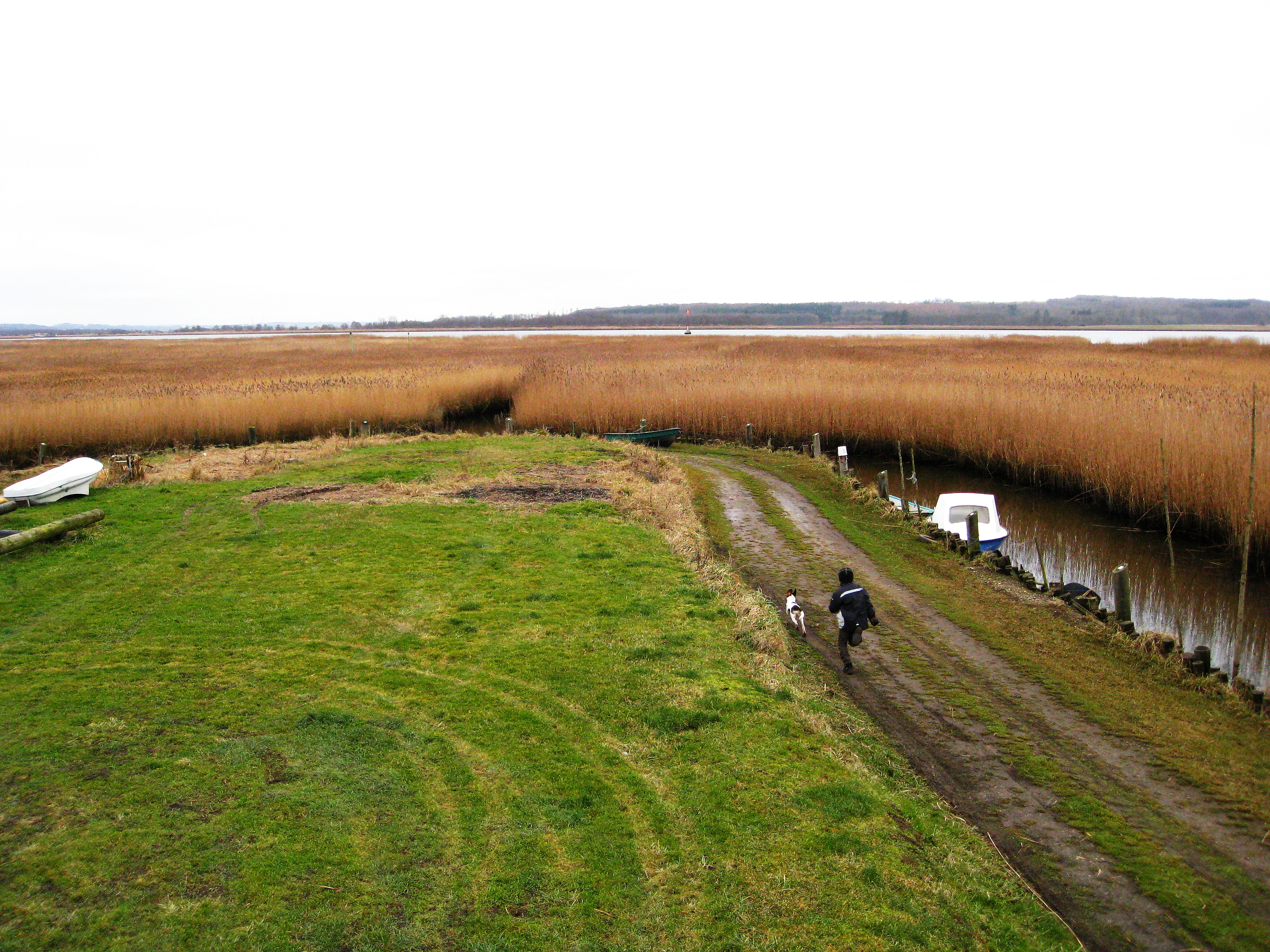
Reed-covered outlet at the delta of Randers Fjord

The area north of Kolind Sound (Kolindsund), 15 km (9 mi) north up to the coast, consists mainly of low hills with predominantly sandy soil that is quite good farmland. Northern Djursland is the most forested and least inhabited part of Djursland.

Randers Fjord: The northeastern corner of northern Djursland is bounded by Randers Fjord, a long and narrow outlet through which Denmark's largest river, the Gudenå, enters the Kattegat. The land bordering Randers Fjord is in some places marshy plains covered in reeds, which to some extent are cut and used for traditional thatching of house roofs.

Two small car ferries cross Randers Fjord at Udbyhøj and Voer. The smallest one, at Voer, is a cable ferry that carries under 10 cars at a time on the open deck. The crossings over the fjord are under half a kilometre long.

== Forests ==
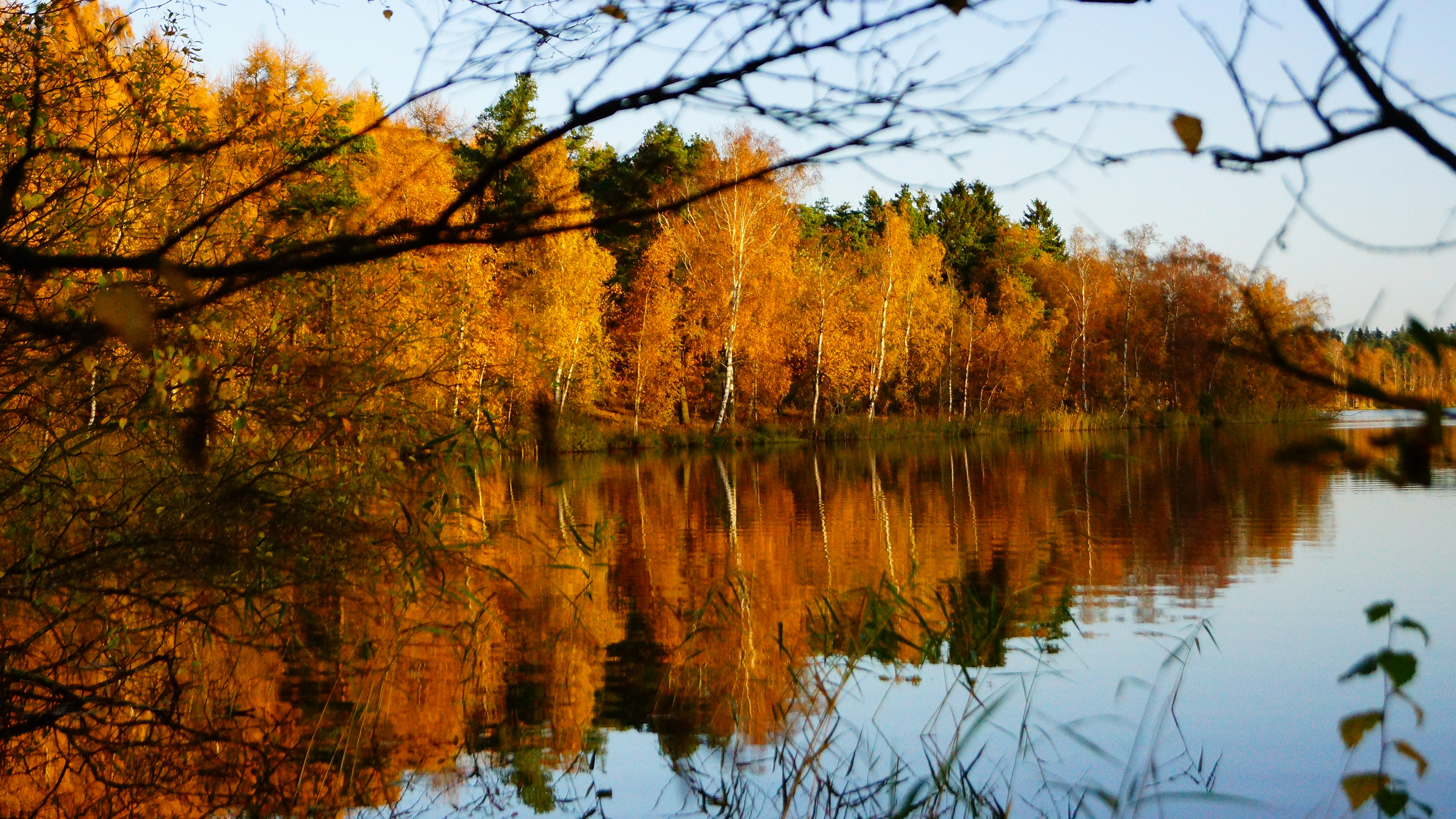
Eye Lake in Skramsø Forest

Djursland has three main wooded areas:

- Emmedsbo forest area to the northeast.
- Løvenholm Skov in the west-central part.
- Skramsø Plantage to the south.

These three woods each have an area of approximately 50 km^{2} (20 sq mi). Wildlife in Djursland includes four species of deer, with roe deer the smallest and most common, and red deer the largest. The two others are fallow deer and sika deer. Hares, foxes, badgers and pheasants are common.

In recent years, ravens have become more widespread, just as some species of large birds of prey that had not bred here for many decades, such as kites, have reinhabited Djursland. Like Denmark as a whole, Djursland has no large predators such as wolves or bears.

== Towns ==
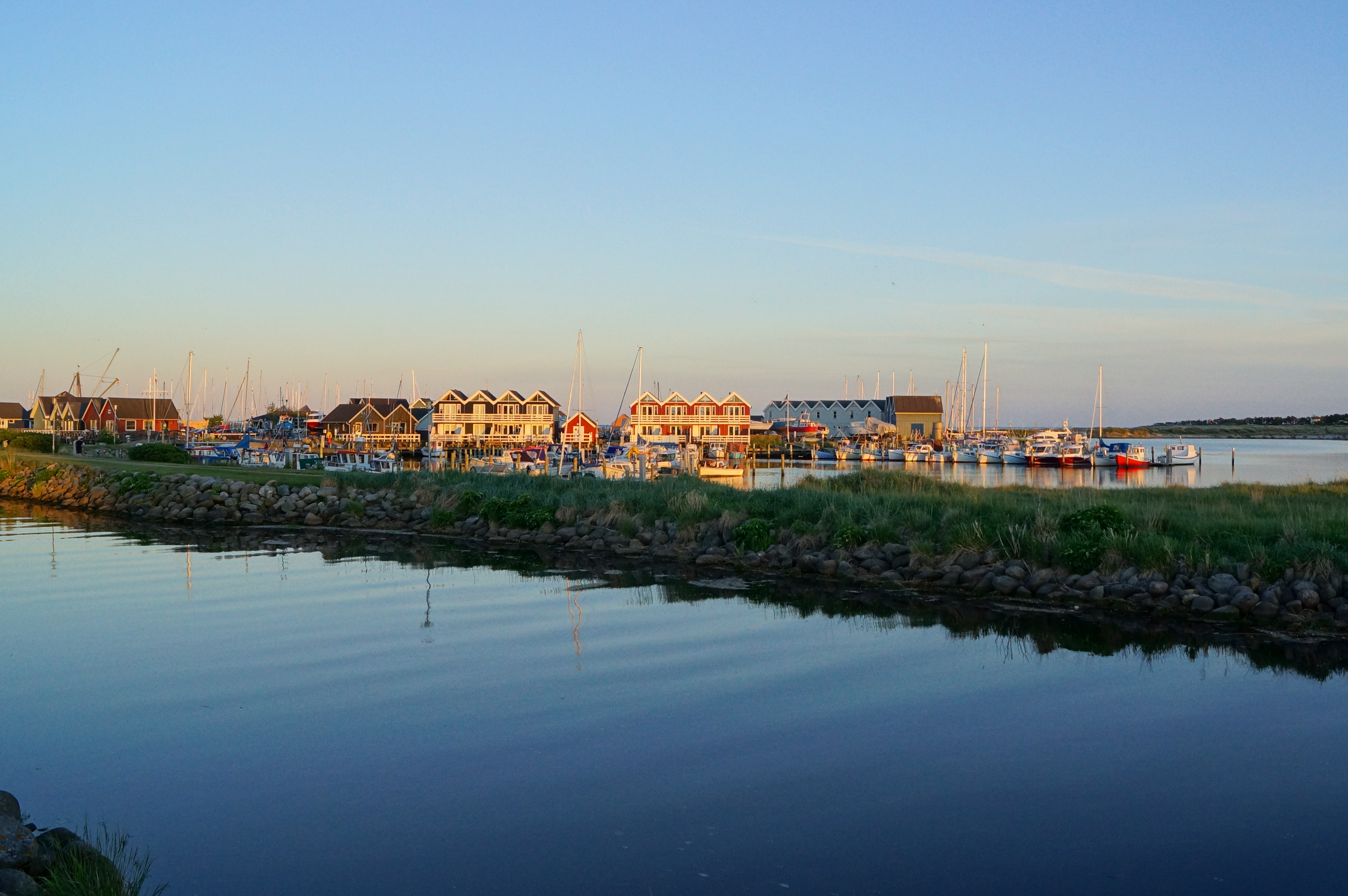
Grenå Marina

Grenå – a seaport on the central eastern coast – is the largest town in Djursland with a population of 14,454. Grenå has ferry connections to Halmstad in Sweden and the island of Anholt. There is a commercial seaport that has expanded in recent years. The 5-kilometre (3 mi) sandy Grenå beach is important for the area's tourism, with a hinterland of summer cottages with many rentals. As elsewhere in the western world, Grenå's manufacturing industry has stagnated. Development of tourism and educational institutions is sought to play a larger role for the economy in the future. Grenå is a regional shopping centre for central-eastern Djursland.

Ebeltoft, at the Bight of Ebeloft in southeastern Djursland, is the second-largest town, with 7,528 inhabitants. Tourism is the single most important source of income. There are over 8000 summer cottages in the Ebeltoft area with many rentals. Tourism in the Ebeltoft area is in part based on a picturesque historical and rural town centre, and the hilly coastal landscapes of Mols with accessible coastline and beaches with many bights and inlets. Ebeltoft is connected by ferry to Zealand, the eastern main island of Denmark on which the capital, Copenhagen (pop. 1,237,280), is located.

Smaller towns in Djursland with shopping centres include Rønde, Hornslet, Auning, Mørke, Ryomgård, Kolind, Allingåbro, Fjellerup Strand, Pindstrup and Glesborg.

== Tourism ==
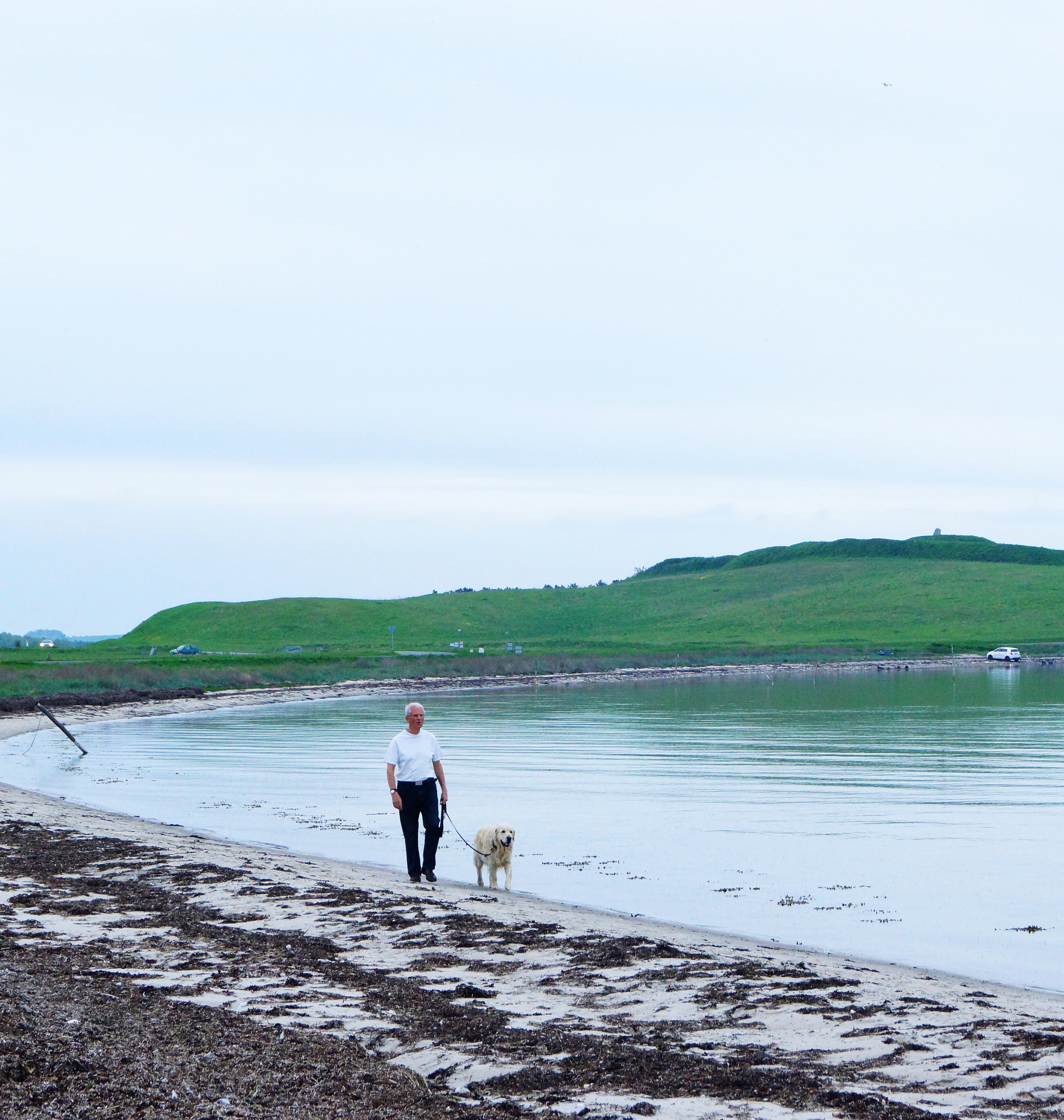
There is public access to all coastlines in Denmark by law, here at the Bight of Begtrup, southern Djursland

Djursland has 22 registered sandy beaches, each with adjacent areas of summer rentals and cottages. The beaches here are protected from the tides, strong currents, and the large waves typical of the Atlantic shores. The water quality is controlled and good, due to national waste water treatment standards, and a low population density. The low population density of 51 inhabitants per square kilometre (130/sq mi), as compared to Germany's 230/km^{2} (600/sq mi) and England's 410/km^{2} (1,100/sq mi), is a contributing factor in making Djursland attractive for visitors. Another factor is climate: Djursland is less rainy than England, and rarely suffers from the sweltering summer heat that can be a challenge in Mediterranean coastal regions. Foreign tourists come primarily from Germany, Norway, Sweden and the Netherlands. Ebeltoft also gets many Danish tourists. Germans are known for visiting outside the high season, and for seeking landscape- and nature-oriented attractions of the coast and countryside.

Angling, for fish like sea trout, plaice or garfish, is a common pastime, as are diving and scuba diving, particularly on the steeper east coast.

By law, the coastlines of Denmark are accessible to everybody. Good accessibility to the coasts of Djursland is probably the single most important factor favoring tourism in the area.

There is a distribution of marinas along the coasts of Djursland and nearby shores, generating a well-developed yacht tourism in the summer.

Djursland also contains the major attractions of Djurs Sommerland, Ree Park – Ebeltoft Safari, Scandinavian Wildlife Park and Kattegatcentret, attracting tourists throughout the year, but mostly in the summertime.

== See also ==
- Coastline of Djursland
