= Karim Kamanzi =

Rwandan footballer

Personal information
- Full name: Abdul Karim Kamanzi Habimana
- Date of birth: March 18, 1983 (age 43)
- Place of birth: Kigali, Rwanda
- Height: 1.85 m (6 ft 1 in)
- Position: Striker

Senior career*
Years	Team	Apps	(Gls)
1997	Kiyovu Sport Kigali		
1998	APR FC		
1999–2000	Rayon Sports		
2000–2001	K.A.S. Eupen		
2001–2002	Battice FC		
2002–2006	R.C.S. Visé		
2006	SHB Da Nang F.C.		
2008–2010	Enosi Alexandroupoli		

International career
2004	Rwanda	2	(1)
- * Club domestic league appearances and goals

Karim Kamanzi (born 18 March 1983) is a retired Rwandan football striker. He was capped for the Rwanda national football team at the 2004 African Cup of Nations.
