= Saïd Makasi =

Footballer (born 1982)

Personal information
- Full name: Saïdi Abedi Makasi
- Date of birth: 20 August 1982 (age 44)
- Place of birth: Bukavu, Zaire
- Height: 1.78 m (5 ft 10 in)
- Position: Striker

Youth career
- 1997–1998: Bitumastic

Senior career*
Years	Team	Apps	(Gls)
1999–2000	Express	24	(7)
2001	Renaissance Kigali	13	(1)
2001	Kampala City Council	22	(9)
2002	SC Villa	19	(8)
2003–2004	F.C. Strombeek	16	(9)
2004	FC Brussels	24	(1)
2004	→ KV Mechelen (loan)	3	(1)
2005–2006	Sakaryaspor	27	(7)
2006–2007	Hapoel Petah Tikva	19	(5)
2007–2008	Maccabi Herzliya	15	(3)
2008	→ Hapoel Be'er Sheva (loan)	16	(3)
2008–2010	Difaa El Jadida	31	(10)
2010–2011	Widad Fez	6	(0)
2011–2012	Rayon Sport		
2012–2015	Espoir		
2015–2017	Muungano		
2017	Espoir		

International career
2003–2009	Rwanda	24	(8)
- * Club domestic league appearances and goals

Saïd Abed Makasi (born 20 August 1982) is a former professional footballer who played as a striker. Born in Zaire, he played for the Rwanda national team at international level.

== Club career ==
On 29 July 2011, Makasi sealed signed a one-year deal with Primus National Football League side Rayon Sports.

== International career ==
Makasi is a former member of the Rwanda national team.
