= 2006 Africa Cup of Nations squads =

Below is a list of squads used in the 2006 Africa Cup of Nations.

== Group A ==
=== Egypt ===
Coach: (Egypt) Hassan Shehata

No.	Pos.	Player	Date of birth (age)	Caps	Club
1	GK	Essam El-Hadary	15 January 1973 (aged 33)		(Egypt) Al Ahly
2	DF	Ahmad El-Sayed	30 October 1980 (aged 25)		(Egypt) Al Ahly
3	DF	Mohamed Abdelwahab	13 July 1983 (aged 22)		(Egypt) Al Ahly
4	DF	Ibrahim Said	16 October 1979 (aged 26)		(Egypt) Zamalek
5	DF	Abdel-Zaher El-Saqqa	30 January 1974 (aged 31)		(Turkey) Konyaspor
6	MF	Hassan Mostafa	20 November 1979 (aged 26)		(Egypt) Al Ahly
7	DF	Ahmed Fathy	10 November 1984 (aged 21)		(Egypt) Ismaily
8	MF	Moataz Eno	8 August 1984 (aged 21)		(Egypt) Zamalek
9	FW	Hossam Hassan	10 August 1966 (aged 39)		(Egypt) Al-Masry
10	FW	Emad Moteab	20 February 1983 (aged 22)		(Egypt) Al Ahly
11	MF	Mohamed Shawky	5 October 1981 (aged 24)		(Egypt) Al Ahly
12	FW	Mohamed Barakat	7 September 1976 (aged 29)		(Egypt) Al Ahly
13	DF	Tarek El-Sayed	5 April 1978 (aged 27)		(Egypt) Zamalek
14	FW	Abdel Halim Ali	24 October 1973 (aged 32)		(Egypt) Zamalek
15	FW	Mido	23 February 1983 (aged 22)		(England) Tottenham Hotspur
16	GK	Abdel Wahed El-Sayed	3 June 1977 (aged 28)		(Egypt) Zamalek
17	MF	Ahmed Hassan	2 May 1975 (aged 30)		(Turkey) Beşiktaş
18	MF	Samir Sabry	13 January 1976 (aged 30)		(Egypt) ENPPI
19	FW	Amr Zaki	1 April 1983 (aged 22)		(Egypt) ENPPI
20	DF	Wael Gomaa	3 August 1975 (aged 30)		(Egypt) Al Ahly
21	MF	Ahmed Eid Abdel Malek	15 May 1980 (aged 25)		(Egypt) Haras El Hodoud
22	MF	Mohamed Aboutrika	7 November 1978 (aged 27)		(Egypt) Al Ahly
23	GK	Mohamed Abdel Monsef	6 February 1977 (aged 28)		(Egypt) Al-Zamalek

=== Libya ===
Coach: (Croatia) Ilija Lončarević

No.	Pos.	Player	Date of birth (age)	Caps	Club
1	GK	Samir Abbud (captain)	29 September 1976 (aged 29)		(Libya) Ittihad
2	DF	Walid Osman	28 February 1977 (aged 28)		(Libya) Ittihad
3	DF	Naji Shushan	14 January 1981 (aged 25)		(Libya) Ittihad
4	DF	Omar Daoud	9 April 1983 (aged 22)		(Algeria) JS Kabylie
5	DF	Younes Shibani	27 June 1981 (aged 24)		(Libya) Olomby
6	MF	Marei Ramly	4 December 1977 (aged 28)		(Libya) Ittihad
7	FW	Jehad Muntasser	26 July 1978 (aged 27)		(Italy) Treviso
8	MF	Khaled Hussein	24 February 1977 (aged 28)		(Libya) Nasr
9	FW	Ahmed Zuway	28 December 1982 (aged 23)		(Libya) Ahly Benghazi
10	FW	Ahmed Saad	7 August 1979 (aged 26)		(Libya) Ahly Tripoli
11	FW	Ahmed El Masli	28 December 1979 (aged 26)		(Libya) Ittihad
12	GK	Luis de Agustini	5 April 1976 (aged 29)		(Uruguay) Liverpool
13	DF	Essam Blal	15 September 1978 (aged 27)		(Libya) Olomby
14	MF	Tarik El Taib	28 February 1977 (aged 28)		(Turkey) Gaziantepspor
15	FW	Nader Kara	19 January 1980 (aged 26)		(Libya) Olomby
16	MF	Nader Al Tarhouni	24 October 1979 (aged 26)		(Qatar) Siliya
17	DF	Mahmoud Makhlouf	6 April 1975 (aged 30)		(Libya) Ittihad
18	DF	Osama Hamadi	7 June 1975 (aged 30)		(Libya) Ittihad
19	FW	Abdusalam Khames	12 April 1974 (aged 31)		(Libya) Olomby
20	FW	Salim al Rewani	28 February 1977 (aged 28)		(Libya) Ittihad
21	GK	Muftah Ghazalla	3 October 1977 (aged 28)		(Libya) Ittihad
22	DF	Madi Belkher	4 February 1978 (aged 27)		(Libya) Hilal
23	MF	Abdulnaser Slil	2 September 1981 (aged 24)		(Libya) Ittihad

=== Morocco ===
Coach: (Morocco) Mohamed Fakhir

No.	Pos.	Player	Date of birth (age)	Caps	Club
1	GK	Tarik El Jarmouni	30 December 1977 (aged 28)		(Morocco) FAR Rabat
2	DF	Walid Regragui	23 September 1975 (aged 30)		(Spain) Racing de Santander
3	DF	Noureddine Kacemi	17 October 1977 (aged 28)		(France) Grenoble
4	DF	Abdeslam Ouaddou	1 November 1978 (aged 27)		(France) Rennes
5	DF	Talal El Karkouri	8 July 1976 (aged 29)		(England) Charlton Athletic
6	DF	Noureddine Naybet	10 February 1970 (aged 35)		(England) Tottenham Hotspur
7	FW	Jaouad Zaïri	14 April 1982 (aged 23)		(France) Sochaux
8	DF	El Houssaine Ouchla	1 December 1970 (aged 35)		(Morocco) FAR Rabat
9	FW	Ali Boussaboun	11 June 1979 (aged 26)		(Netherlands) Feyenoord
10	MF	Mohamed Madihi	15 February 1979 (aged 26)		(Morocco) Wydad Casablanca
11	MF	Mohamed El Yaagoubi	12 September 1977 (aged 28)		(Spain) Osasuna
12	GK	Mustapha Chadili	14 February 1973 (aged 32)		(Morocco) Raja Casablanca
13	MF	Houssine Kharja	9 November 1982 (aged 23)		(Italy) Roma
14	MF	Hafid Abdessadek	24 February 1974 (aged 31)		(Morocco) FAR Rabat
15	MF	Youssef Safri	13 January 1977 (aged 29)		(England) Norwich City
16	DF	Amin Erbati	1 July 1981 (aged 24)		Nadi Qatar
17	FW	Marouane Chamakh	10 January 1984 (aged 22)		(France) Bordeaux
18	MF	Youssef Chippo	10 May 1973 (aged 32)		(Qatar) Al-Wakra
19	FW	Hicham Aboucherouane	2 April 1981 (aged 24)		(France) Lille
20	FW	Youssouf Hadji	25 February 1980 (aged 25)		(France) Rennes
21	DF	Badr El Kaddouri	31 January 1981 (aged 24)		(Ukraine) Dynamo Kyiv
22	GK	Nadir Lamyaghri	13 February 1976 (aged 29)		(Morocco) Wydad Casablanca
23	FW	Mohamed Armoumen	7 September 1978 (aged 27)		Al Kuwait Kaifan

=== Ivory Coast ===
Coach: (France) Henri Michel

No.	Pos.	Player	Date of birth (age)	Caps	Club
1	GK	Jean-Jacques Tizié	7 September 1972 (aged 33)		(Tunisia) Espérance
2	MF	Kanga Akale	7 March 1981 (aged 24)		(France) Auxerre
3	DF	Arthur Boka	2 April 1983 (aged 22)		(France) Strasbourg
4	MF	Kolo Touré	19 March 1981 (aged 24)		(England) Arsenal
5	MF	Didier Zokora	14 December 1980 (aged 25)		(France) Saint-Étienne
6	DF	Blaise Kouassi	2 February 1974 (aged 31)		(France) Troyes
7	MF	Emerse Faé	24 January 1984 (aged 21)		(France) Nantes
8	FW	Bonaventure Kalou	12 January 1978 (aged 28)		(France) Paris Saint-Germain
9	FW	Arouna Koné	11 November 1983 (aged 22)		(Netherlands) PSV
10	MF	Gilles Yapi Yapo	13 January 1982 (aged 24)		(France) Nantes
11	FW	Didier Drogba	11 March 1978 (aged 27)		(England) Chelsea
12	DF	Abdoulaye Méïté	6 October 1980 (aged 25)		(France) Marseille
13	DF	Marco Zoro	27 December 1983 (aged 22)		(Italy) Messina
14	FW	Bakari Koné	17 September 1981 (aged 24)		(France) Nice
15	FW	Aruna Dindane	26 November 1980 (aged 25)		(France) Lens
16	GK	Gérard Gnanhouan	12 December 1979 (aged 26)		(France) Montpellier
17	DF	Cyril Domoraud	22 July 1971 (aged 34)		(France) Créteil-Lusitanos
18	MF	Siaka Tiéné	22 February 1982 (aged 23)		(France) Saint-Étienne
19	DF	Yaya Touré	13 May 1983 (aged 22)		(Greece) Olympiacos
20	MF	Guy Demel	13 June 1981 (aged 24)		(Germany) Hamburger SV
21	DF	Emmanuel Eboué	4 June 1983 (aged 22)		(England) Arsenal
22	MF	Romaric	4 June 1983 (aged 22)		(France) Le Mans
23	GK	Boubacar Barry	20 December 1979 (aged 26)		(Belgium) Beveren

== Group B ==
=== Cameroon ===
Coach: (Portugal) Artur Jorge

No.	Pos.	Player	Date of birth (age)	Caps	Club
1	GK	Carlos Kameni	18 February 1984 (aged 21)		(Spain) Espanyol
2	DF	Jean-Hugues Ateba	1 April 1981 (aged 24)		(France) Paris Saint-Germain
3	DF	Timothée Atouba	17 February 1982 (aged 23)		(Germany) Hamburger SV
4	DF	Rigobert Song	1 July 1976 (aged 29)		(Turkey) Galatasaray
5	DF	Raymond Kalla	22 April 1975 (aged 30)		(Turkey) Sivasspor
6	DF	Benoît Angbwa	1 January 1982 (aged 24)		(Russia) Krylya Sovetov Samara
7	MF	Daniel Kome	19 May 1984 (aged 21)		(Spain) Ciudad de Murcia
8	DF	Geremi	20 December 1978 (aged 27)		(England) Newcastle United
9	FW	Samuel Eto'o	10 March 1981 (aged 24)		(Spain) Barcelona
10	MF	Achille Emaná	5 June 1982 (aged 23)		(France) Toulouse
11	MF	Jean Makoun	29 May 1983 (aged 22)		(France) Lille
12	DF	Armand Deumi	12 March 1979 (aged 26)		(France) Bordeaux
13	MF	Guy Feutchine	18 November 1976 (aged 29)		(Greece) PAOK
14	MF	Alioum Saidou	19 February 1978 (aged 27)		(Turkey) Galatasaray
15	FW	Pierre Webó	20 January 1982 (aged 24)		(Spain) Osasuna
16	GK	Souleymanou Hamidou	22 November 1973 (aged 32)		(Turkey) Denizlispor
17	GK	Pierre-Owono Ebede	9 September 1980 (aged 25)		(Greece) Panathinaikos
18	FW	Roudolphe Douala	25 September 1978 (aged 27)		(Portugal) Sporting CP
19	MF	Eric Djemba-Djemba	4 May 1981 (aged 24)		(England) Aston Villa
20	MF	Salomon Olembé	8 December 1980 (aged 25)		(Qatar) Al-Rayyan
21	FW	Pierre Boya	16 January 1984 (aged 22)		(Serbia and Montenegro) Partizan
22	FW	Albert Meyong	19 October 1985 (aged 20)		(Portugal) Belenenses
23	DF	André Bikey	8 January 1985 (aged 21)		(Russia) Lokomotiv Moscow

=== Angola ===
Coach: (Angola) Oliveira Gonçalves

No.	Pos.	Player	Date of birth (age)	Caps	Club
1	GK	João Ricardo	7 January 1970 (aged 36)		unattached
2	DF	Jacinto	14 December 1974 (aged 31)		(Angola) ASA
3	DF	Jamba	10 July 1977 (aged 28)		(Angola) ASA
4	MF	Lebo-Lebo	29 May 1977 (aged 28)		(Angola) Sagrada Esperança
5	DF	Kali	11 October 1978 (aged 27)		(Portugal) Barreirense
6	MF	Miloy	27 May 1981 (aged 24)		(Angola) Interclube
7	MF	Figueiredo	28 November 1972 (aged 33)		(Portugal) Varzim
8	MF	André Macanga	14 May 1978 (aged 27)		Kuwait SC
9	FW	Mantorras	18 March 1982 (aged 23)		(Portugal) Benfica
10	FW	Akwá	30 May 1977 (aged 28)		(Qatar) Al-Wakra
11	MF	Johnson Macaba	23 January 1978 (aged 27)		(Brazil) Portuguesa
12	GK	Lamá	1 February 1981 (aged 24)		(Angola) Petro de Luanda
13	FW	Edson Nobre	3 February 1980 (aged 25)		(Portugal) Paços de Ferreira
14	DF	Mendonça	9 October 1982 (aged 23)		(Portugal) Varzim
15	FW	Maurito	24 June 1981 (aged 24)		(United Arab Emirates) Al-Wahda
16	FW	Flávio	20 December 1979 (aged 26)		(Egypt) Al Ahly
17	MF	Zé Kalanga	12 October 1983 (aged 22)		(Angola) Petro de Luanda
18	FW	Love	10 January 1982 (aged 24)		(Angola) ASA
19	FW	Titi Buengo	11 February 1980 (aged 25)		(France) Clermont
20	DF	Locó	25 December 1984 (aged 21)		(Angola) Benfica de Luanda
21	DF	Delgado	1 November 1979 (aged 26)		(Angola) Primeiro de Agosto
22	GK	Goliath	1 October 1972 (aged 33)		(Angola) Sagrada Esperança
23	DF	Marco Abreu	8 December 1974 (aged 31)		(Portugal) Portimonense

=== Togo ===
Coach: (Nigeria) Stephen Keshi

No.	Pos.	Player	Date of birth (age)	Caps	Club
1	GK	Ouro-Nimini Tchagnirou	31 December 1977 (aged 28)		(Mali) Djoliba
2	DF	Daré Nibombé	16 June 1980 (aged 25)		(Belgium) Mons
3	DF	Jean-Paul Abalo	26 June 1975 (aged 30)		(France) Dunkerque
4	FW	Emmanuel Adebayor	16 February 1984 (aged 21)		(England) Arsenal
5	DF	Massamasso Tchangai	8 August 1978 (aged 27)		(Italy) Benevento
6	MF	Yao Aziawonou	30 November 1979 (aged 26)		(Switzerland) Young Boys
7	MF	Moustapha Salifou	1 June 1983 (aged 22)		(France) Brest
8	MF	Abdoul-Gafar Mamah	24 August 1985 (aged 20)		(Gabon) Libreville
9	FW	Mickaël Dogbé	28 November 1976 (aged 29)		(France) Rouen
10	MF	Chérif Touré Mamam	13 January 1978 (aged 28)		(France) Metz
11	FW	Sherif Touré Coubageat	27 December 1983 (aged 22)		(Germany) Concordia Ihrhove
12	DF	Eric Akoto	20 July 1980 (aged 25)		(Austria) Admira Wacker Mödling
13	DF	Emmanuel Mathias	3 April 1986 (aged 19)		(Tunisia) Espérance de Tunis
14	FW	Adékambi Olufadé	7 January 1980 (aged 26)		(Qatar) Al-Sailiya
15	MF	Alaixys Romao	18 January 1984 (aged 22)		(France) Louhans-Cuiseaux
16	GK	Kossi Agassa	2 July 1978 (aged 27)		(France) Metz
17	FW	Mohamed Kader	8 April 1979 (aged 26)		(France) Sochaux
18	FW	Yao Junior Sènaya	19 April 1984 (aged 21)		(Switzerland) Yverdon-Sport
19	MF	Haliru Alidu	24 February 1984 (aged 21)		(Togo) Douanes
20	DF	Ludovic Assemoassa	18 September 1980 (aged 25)		(Spain) Ciudad de Murcia
21	DF	Zanzan Atte-Oudeyi	2 September 1980 (aged 25)		(Belgium) Lokeren
22	GK	Kodjovi Obilale	8 October 1984 (aged 21)		(Togo) Étoile Filante
23	MF	Kassim Guyazou	7 January 1982 (aged 24)		(Togo) Étoile Filante

=== DR Congo ===
Coach: (France) Claude Le Roy

No.	Pos.	Player	Date of birth (age)	Caps	Club
1	GK	Pascal Kalemba	26 February 1979 (aged 26)		(Gabon) Delta Téléstar
2	DF	Cyrille Mubiala	7 July 1974 (aged 31)		(South Africa) Ajax Cape Town
3	DF	Dituabanza Nsumbu	31 January 1982 (aged 23)		(Democratic Republic of the Congo) ASV Club
4	MF	Tsholola Tshinyama	12 December 1980 (aged 25)		(South Africa) Ajax Cape Town
5	FW	Mbala Mbuta Biscotte	7 April 1985 (aged 20)		(Switzerland) Yverdon-Sport
6	MF	Mutamba Milambo	1 December 1984 (aged 21)		(France) Le Havre
7	FW	Christian Kinkela	25 May 1982 (aged 23)		(France) Amiens
8	FW	Tresor Mputu	12 December 1985 (aged 20)		(Democratic Republic of the Congo) Tout Puissant Mazembe
9	FW	Lomana LuaLua	28 December 1980 (aged 25)		(England) Portsmouth
10	MF	Zola Matumona	26 November 1981 (aged 24)		(Democratic Republic of the Congo) ASV Club
11	MF	Marcel Kimemba Mbayo	23 April 1978 (aged 27)		(Turkey) Sakarya-Sport
12	MF	Franck Matingou	4 December 1979 (aged 26)		(France) Bastia
13	DF	Nono Lubanzadio	27 January 1980 (aged 25)		(Democratic Republic of the Congo) Tout Puissant Mazembe
14	MF	Ngasanya Ilongo	8 August 1984 (aged 21)		(Democratic Republic of the Congo) DCMP
15	DF	Hérita Ilunga	25 February 1982 (aged 23)		(France) Saint-Étienne
16	GK	Dikete Tampungu	16 April 1980 (aged 25)		(South Africa) Bush Bucks
17	FW	Lelo Mbele	10 August 1987 (aged 18)		(South Africa) Orlando Pirates
18	DF	Gladys Bokese	10 September 1981 (aged 24)		(Democratic Republic of the Congo) DCMP
19	MF	Jean-Paul Kalala	28 September 1982 (aged 23)		(England) Grimsby Town
20	DF	Tshamalenga Kabundi	15 May 1980 (aged 25)		(Democratic Republic of the Congo) Tout Puissant Mazembe
21	MF	Ndandu Kasongo	6 December 1981 (aged 24)		(Democratic Republic of the Congo) Tout Puissant Mazembe
22	FW	Musasa Kabamba	30 May 1982 (aged 23)		(Turkey) İstanbulspor
23	GK	Francis Chansa	10 September 1974 (aged 31)		(South Africa) Orlando Pirates

== Group C ==
=== Tunisia ===
Coach: (France) Roger Lemerre

No.	Pos.	Player	Date of birth (age)	Caps	Club
1	GK	Ali Boumnijel	13 April 1966 (aged 39)		(Tunisia) Club Africain
2	DF	Issam Merdassi	16 March 1981 (aged 24)		(Tunisia) Sfaxien
3	DF	Karim Haggui	21 January 1984 (aged 21)		(Tunisia) Étoile du Sahel
4	DF	Sofiane Melliti	18 August 1978 (aged 27)		(Ukraine) Vorskla Poltava
5	FW	Ziad Jaziri	12 July 1978 (aged 27)		(France) Troyes
6	DF	Hatem Trabelsi	25 January 1977 (aged 28)		(Netherlands) Ajax
7	MF	Chaouki Ben Saada	1 July 1984 (aged 21)		(France) Bastia
8	MF	Hamed Namouchi	12 January 1984 (aged 22)		(Scotland) Rangers
9	FW	Haikel Gmamdia	22 December 1981 (aged 24)		(France) Strasbourg
10	MF	Kais Ghodhbane	7 January 1976 (aged 30)		(Turkey) Samsunspor
11	FW	Francileudo Santos	20 March 1979 (aged 26)		(France) Toulouse
12	MF	Jawhar Mnari	8 November 1976 (aged 29)		(Germany) 1. FC Nürnberg
13	MF	Riadh Bouazizi	8 April 1973 (aged 32)		(Turkey) Kayseri Erciyesspor
14	MF	Adel Chedli	16 September 1976 (aged 29)		(Germany) 1. FC Nürnberg
15	DF	Radhi Jaïdi	30 August 1975 (aged 30)		(England) Bolton Wanderers
16	GK	Khaled Fadhel	29 September 1976 (aged 29)		(Turkey) Kayseri Erciyesspor
17	FW	Issam Jemaa	28 January 1984 (aged 21)		(France) Lens
18	MF	Selim Benachour	8 September 1981 (aged 24)		(Portugal) Vitória de Guimarães
19	DF	Anis Ayari	16 February 1982 (aged 23)		(Turkey) Samsunspor
20	DF	José Clayton	21 March 1974 (aged 31)		(Qatar) Al-Sadd
21	DF	Alaeddine Yahia	26 September 1981 (aged 24)		(France) Saint-Étienne
22	GK	Hamdi Kasraoui	18 January 1983 (aged 23)		(Tunisia) Espérance
23	MF	Amine Ltaief	4 July 1984 (aged 21)		(Tunisia) Espérance

=== Zambia ===
Coach: (Zambia) Kalusha Bwalya

No.	Pos.	Player	Date of birth (age)	Caps	Club
1	GK	Kennedy Mweene	11 December 1984 (aged 21)		(South Africa) Free State Stars
3	DF	Kennedy Nketani	25 November 1984 (aged 21)		(Zambia) Zanaco
4	DF	Joseph Musonda	30 May 1977 (aged 28)		(South Africa) Free State Stars
5	DF	Elijah Tana	28 February 1975 (aged 30)		(Angola) Atlético Petróleos
6	DF	Mark Sinyangwe	29 December 1979 (aged 26)		(Zambia) Green Buffaloes
7	FW	Clifford Mulenga	5 August 1987 (aged 18)		(Sweden) Örgryte
8	MF	Isaac Chansa	23 March 1984 (aged 21)		(South Africa) Orlando Pirates
9	FW	Collins Mbesuma	3 February 1984 (aged 21)		(England) Portsmouth
10	MF	Ian Bakala	1 November 1980 (aged 25)		(Angola) Primeiro de Agosto
11	FW	Christopher Katongo	31 August 1981 (aged 24)		(South Africa) Jomo Cosmos
12	FW	Harry Milanzi	13 March 1978 (aged 27)		(Angola) Primeiro de Agosto
13	DF	Misheck Lungu	2 June 1980 (aged 25)		(Hungary) Lombard-Pápa
14	MF	Mumamba Numba	21 March 1978 (aged 27)		(Zambia) Zanaco
15	FW	Linos Chalwe	17 September 1980 (aged 25)		(Tunisia) Étoile du Sahel
16	GK	George Kolala	3 March 1976 (aged 29)		(Zambia) Zanaco
17	MF	Andrew Sinkala	18 June 1979 (aged 26)		(Germany) 1. FC Köln
18	DF	Billy Mwanza	21 January 1983 (aged 22)		(Zambia) Power Dynamos
19	DF	Clive Hachilensa	17 September 1979 (aged 26)		(South Africa) Free State Stars
20	MF	Felix Katongo	18 April 1984 (aged 21)		(South Africa) Jomo Cosmos
21	MF	Rainford Kalaba	14 August 1986 (aged 19)		(France) Nice
22	FW	James Chamanga	2 February 1980 (aged 25)		(South Africa) Bush Bucks
23	MF	William Njovu	4 March 1987 (aged 18)		(Zambia) Lusaka Dynamos

=== South Africa ===
Coach: (Romania) Ted Dumitru

No.	Pos.	Player	Date of birth (age)	Caps	Club
1	GK	Calvin Marlin	20 April 1976 (aged 29)		(South Africa) SuperSport United
2	DF	Jimmy Tau	23 July 1980 (aged 25)		(South Africa) Kaizer Chiefs
3	DF	Daniel Tshabalala	6 October 1977 (aged 28)		(South Africa) Orlando Pirates
4	DF	Ricardo Katza	12 March 1978 (aged 27)		(South Africa) SuperSport United
5	MF	Mbulelo Mabizela	16 September 1980 (aged 25)		(Norway) Vålerenga
6	DF	Siboniso Gaxa	6 April 1984 (aged 21)		(South Africa) SuperSport United
7	MF	Siphiwe Tshabalala	25 September 1984 (aged 21)		(South Africa) SuperSport United
8	MF	Mlungisi Gumbi	9 March 1980 (aged 25)		(South Africa) Golden Arrows
9	FW	Toni Nhleko	24 July 1979 (aged 26)		(Norway) Viking
10	MF	Benedict Vilakazi	9 August 1982 (aged 23)		(South Africa) Orlando Pirates
11	MF	Elrio van Heerden	11 July 1983 (aged 22)		(Belgium) Club Brugge
12	MF	Joseph Makhanya	15 September 1981 (aged 24)		(South Africa) Orlando Pirates
13	DF	Pierre Issa	11 September 1975 (aged 30)		(Greece) OFI Crete
14	FW	Siyabonga Nomvete	2 December 1977 (aged 28)		(South Africa) Orlando Pirates
15	FW	Sibusiso Zuma	23 June 1976 (aged 29)		(Germany) Arminia Bielefeld
16	GK	Moeneeb Josephs	19 May 1980 (aged 25)		(South Africa) Ajax Cape Town
17	FW	Benni McCarthy	12 November 1977 (aged 28)		(Portugal) Porto
18	FW	Katlego Mphela	29 November 1984 (aged 21)		(South Africa) SuperSport United
19	DF	Tsepo Masilela	5 May 1985 (aged 20)		(South Africa) Premier United
20	MF	Siyabonga Nkosi	22 August 1981 (aged 24)		(South Africa) Bloemfontein Celtic
21	DF	Vuyo Mere	5 March 1984 (aged 21)		(South Africa) Mamelodi Sundowns
22	GK	Avril Phali	17 August 1976 (aged 29)		(South Africa) Jomo Cosmos
23	FW	Lebohang Mokoena	29 September 1986 (aged 19)		(South Africa) Orlando Pirates

=== Guinea ===
Coach: (France) Patrice Neveu

No.	Pos.	Player	Date of birth (age)	Caps	Club
1	GK	Naby Diarso	31 December 1976 (aged 29)		(Guinea) Satellite
2	FW	Pascal Feindouno	27 February 1981 (aged 24)		(France) Saint-Étienne
3	DF	Ibrahima Sory Camara	1 January 1985 (aged 21)		(Italy) Parma
4	DF	Mamadi Kaba	24 November 1986 (aged 19)		(France) Gueugnon
5	DF	Bobo Balde	5 October 1975 (aged 30)		(Scotland) Celtic
6	MF	Pablo Thiam	3 January 1974 (aged 32)		(Germany) VfL Wolfsburg
7	FW	Fodé Mansaré	3 September 1981 (aged 24)		(France) Toulouse
8	MF	Kanfoury Sylla	7 July 1980 (aged 25)		(Greece) Ethnikos
9	FW	Sambégou Bangoura	3 April 1982 (aged 23)		(England) Stoke City
10	FW	Ismaël Bangoura	2 January 1985 (aged 21)		(France) Le Mans
11	FW	Ibrahima Bangoura	8 December 1982 (aged 23)		(France) Troyes
12	DF	Morlaye Cissé	19 December 1983 (aged 22)		(France) Pontivy
13	MF	Ousmane Bangoura	1 December 1979 (aged 26)		(Belgium) Charleroi
14	MF	Ibrahima Sory Souare	14 July 1982 (aged 23)		(France) Jura Sud Foot
15	DF	Oumar Kalabané	8 April 1981 (aged 24)		(France) Auxerre
16	GK	Aboubacar Bangoura	1 January 1982 (aged 24)		(France) Châteauneuf-Neuvic
17	DF	Mamadou Alimou Diallo	2 December 1984 (aged 21)		(Belgium) Lokeren
18	MF	Momo Sylla	13 March 1977 (aged 28)		(England) Leicester City
19	FW	Kaba Diawara	16 December 1975 (aged 30)		(France) Ajaccio
20	FW	Ibrahim Yattara	3 June 1980 (aged 25)		(Turkey) Trabzonspor
21	DF	Daouda Jabi	10 April 1981 (aged 24)		(France) Ajaccio
22	GK	Kémoko Camara	5 April 1975 (aged 30)		(Guinea) Hafia
23	DF	Sekouba Camara	10 August 1983 (aged 22)		(Guinea) Kaloum Star

== Group D ==
=== Nigeria ===
Coach: (Nigeria) Augustine Eguavoen

No.	Pos.	Player	Date of birth (age)	Caps	Club
1	GK	Vincent Enyeama	29 August 1982 (aged 23)		(Israel) Bnei Yehuda Tel Aviv
2	DF	Joseph Yobo	6 September 1980 (aged 25)		(England) Everton
3	DF	Taye Taiwo	16 April 1985 (aged 20)		(France) Marseille
4	FW	Nwankwo Kanu	1 August 1976 (aged 29)		(England) Portsmouth
5	DF	Chidi Odiah	17 December 1983 (aged 22)		(Russia) CSKA Moscow
6	DF	Joseph Enakarhire	6 November 1982 (aged 23)		(Russia) Dynamo Moscow
7	FW	John Utaka	8 January 1982 (aged 24)		(England) Portsmouth
8	MF	Mikel John Obi	2 April 1987 (aged 18)		(England) Chelsea
9	FW	Obafemi Martins	28 October 1984 (aged 21)		(England) Newcastle United
10	MF	Jay-Jay Okocha	14 August 1973 (aged 32)		(England) Bolton Wanderers
11	MF	Garba Lawal	22 May 1974 (aged 31)		(Greece) Iraklis
12	GK	Austin Ejide	8 April 1984 (aged 21)		(Tunisia) Étoile Sportive du Sahel
13	MF	Aila Yussuf	4 November 1984 (aged 21)		(Ukraine) Dynamo Kyiv
14	FW	Victor Obinna	25 March 1987 (aged 18)		(Italy) Chievo
15	DF	Paul Obiefule	15 May 1986 (aged 19)		(Denmark) Viborg
16	MF	Wilson Oruma	30 December 1976 (aged 29)		(France) Marseille
17	FW	Julius Aghahowa	12 February 1982 (aged 23)		(Ukraine) Shakhtar Donetsk
18	MF	Christian Obodo	11 May 1984 (aged 21)		(Italy) Udinese
19	FW	Stephen Makinwa	26 July 1983 (aged 22)		(Italy) Palermo
20	FW	Peter Odemwingie	15 July 1981 (aged 24)		(France) Lille
21	DF	Obinna Nwaneri	19 March 1982 (aged 23)		(Tunisia) Espérance
22	MF	Sani Kaita	2 May 1986 (aged 19)		(Netherlands) Sparta Rotterdam
23	GK	Dele Aiyenugba	20 November 1983 (aged 22)		(Nigeria) Enyimba International

=== Ghana ===
Coach: (Serbia and Montenegro) Ratomir Dujkovic

No.	Pos.	Player	Date of birth (age)	Caps	Club
1	GK	Sammy Adjei	1 September 1980 (aged 25)		(Israel) Ashdod
2	DF	Aziz Ansah	7 October 1980 (aged 25)		(Ghana) Asante Kotoko
3	FW	Louis Agyemang	4 April 1983 (aged 22)		(South Africa) Kaizer Chiefs
4	DF	Samuel Kuffour	3 September 1976 (aged 29)		(Italy) Roma
5	DF	John Mensah	29 November 1982 (aged 23)		(France) Rennes
6	DF	Emmanuel Pappoe	3 March 1981 (aged 24)		(Israel) Hapoel Kfar Saba
7	MF	Laryea Kingston	7 November 1980 (aged 25)		(Russia) Terek Grozny
8	DF	Hans Sarpei	28 June 1976 (aged 29)		(Germany) VfL Wolfsburg
9	FW	Prince Tagoe	9 November 1986 (aged 19)		(Saudi Arabia) Al-Ittihad
10	MF	Stephen Appiah	24 December 1980 (aged 25)		(Turkey) Fenerbahçe
11	DF	Francis Dickoh	13 December 1982 (aged 23)		(Denmark) Nordsjælland
12	FW	Godwin Attram	7 August 1980 (aged 25)		(Saudi Arabia) Al Shabab
13	FW	Joetex Asamoah Frimpong	14 July 1982 (aged 23)		(Nigeria) Enyimba International
14	FW	Mathew Amoah	24 October 1980 (aged 25)		(Germany) Borussia Dortmund
15	MF	John Paintsil	15 June 1981 (aged 24)		(Israel) Hapoel Tel Aviv
16	GK	George Owu	7 July 1982 (aged 23)		(Ghana) Asante Kotoko
17	DF	Daniel Edusei	2 September 1980 (aged 25)		(Greece) Egaleo
18	MF	Abubakari Yakubu	13 December 1981 (aged 24)		(Netherlands) Vitesse
19	MF	Hamza Mohammed	5 November 1980 (aged 25)		(Ghana) Real Tamale United
20	FW	Baba Adamu	20 October 1979 (aged 26)		(Russia) Krylya Sovetov Samara
21	DF	Issah Ahmed	24 May 1982 (aged 23)		(Denmark) Randers
22	GK	Philemon McCarthy	14 August 1983 (aged 22)		Feyenoord Ghana
23	MF	Haminu Dramani	1 April 1986 (aged 19)		(Serbia and Montenegro) Red Star Belgrade

=== Zimbabwe ===
Coach: (Zimbabwe) Charles Mhlauri

No.	Pos.	Player	Date of birth (age)	Caps	Club
1	GK	Energy Murambadoro	27 June 1982 (aged 23)		(Zimbabwe) CAPS United
2	DF	Herbert Dick	2 September 1979 (aged 26)		(Zimbabwe) AmaZulu
3	MF	Esrom Nyandoro	6 February 1980 (aged 25)		(South Africa) Mamelodi Sundowns
4	DF	Bekithemba Ndlovu	9 August 1976 (aged 29)		(South Africa) Silver Stars
5	MF	Francis Chandida	28 May 1979 (aged 26)		(Zimbabwe) Buymore
6	DF	Zvenyika Makonese	7 July 1977 (aged 28)		(South Africa) Santos
7	MF	Joel Lupahla	26 April 1977 (aged 28)		(South Africa) SuperSport United
8	MF	Tinashe Nengomasha	2 September 1982 (aged 23)		(South Africa) Kaizer Chiefs
9	FW	Benjani Mwaruwari	13 August 1978 (aged 27)		(England) Portsmouth
10	FW	Shingayi Kaondera	31 July 1982 (aged 23)		(Turkey) Gaziantepspor
11	DF	Charles Yohane	26 August 1973 (aged 32)		(South Africa) Wits University
12	FW	Peter Ndlovu	25 February 1973 (aged 32)		(South Africa) Mamelodi Sundowns
13	DF	Cephas Chimedza	5 December 1984 (aged 21)		(Belgium) Germinal Beerschot
14	DF	George Mbwando	20 October 1975 (aged 30)		(Germany) Jahn Regensburg
15	MF	Ronald Sibanda	29 August 1976 (aged 29)		(Zimbabwe) Highlanders F.C.
16	GK	Tapuwa Kapini	17 July 1984 (aged 21)		(Zimbabwe) Highlanders
17	FW	Gilbert Mushangazhike	11 August 1975 (aged 30)		(China) Jiangsu Suning
18	FW	Brian Badza	23 June 1979 (aged 26)		(Zimbabwe) CAPS United
19	FW	Edzai Kasinauyo	28 March 1975 (aged 30)		(South Africa) Moroka Swallows
20	MF	Edelbert Dinha	14 March 1973 (aged 32)		(South Africa) Orlando Pirates
21	DF	James Matola	31 May 1977 (aged 28)		(Zimbabwe) Buymore
22	MF	Lloyd Chitembwe	21 June 1971 (aged 34)		(Zimbabwe) CAPS United
23	GK	Gift Muzadzi	2 October 1974 (aged 31)		(Zimbabwe) CAPS United

=== Senegal ===
Coach: (Senegal) Abdoulaye Sarr

No.	Pos.	Player	Date of birth (age)	Caps	Club
1	GK	Tony Sylva	17 May 1975 (aged 30)		(France) Lille
2	DF	Omar Daf	12 February 1977 (aged 28)		(France) Sochaux
3	MF	Guirane N'Daw	24 April 1984 (aged 21)		(France) Sochaux
4	DF	Pape Diakhaté	21 June 1984 (aged 21)		(France) Nancy
5	DF	Souleymane Diawara	24 December 1978 (aged 27)		(France) Sochaux
6	MF	Rahmane Barry	30 June 1986 (aged 19)		(France) Lorient
7	FW	Henri Camara	10 May 1977 (aged 28)		(England) Wigan Athletic
8	FW	Mamadou Niang	13 October 1979 (aged 26)		(France) Marseille
9	FW	Souleymane Camara	22 December 1982 (aged 23)		(France) Nice
10	MF	Issa Ba	7 October 1981 (aged 24)		(France) Châteauroux
11	FW	El Hadji Diouf	15 January 1981 (aged 25)		(England) Bolton Wanderers
12	MF	Amady Faye	12 March 1977 (aged 28)		(England) Newcastle United
13	DF	Lamine Diatta	2 July 1975 (aged 30)		(France) Lyon
14	MF	Frédéric Mendy	6 November 1981 (aged 24)		(France) Saint-Étienne
15	FW	Diomansy Kamara	8 November 1980 (aged 25)		(England) West Bromwich Albion
16	GK	Pape Mamadou Diouf	31 December 1982 (aged 23)		(Senegal) Jeanne d'Arc
17	DF	Ferdinand Coly	10 September 1973 (aged 32)		(Italy) Parma
18	DF	Boukary Dramé	22 July 1985 (aged 20)		(France) Paris Saint-Germain
19	MF	Papa Bouba Diop	28 January 1978 (aged 27)		(England) Fulham
20	MF	Abdoulaye Faye	26 February 1978 (aged 27)		(England) Bolton Wanderers
21	DF	Habib Beye	19 October 1977 (aged 28)		(France) Marseille
22	GK	Cheikh N'Diaye	15 February 1985 (aged 20)		(France) Rennes
23	MF	Dino Djiba	20 December 1985 (aged 20)		(France) Metz
