= List of people related to the Democratic Republic of the Congo =

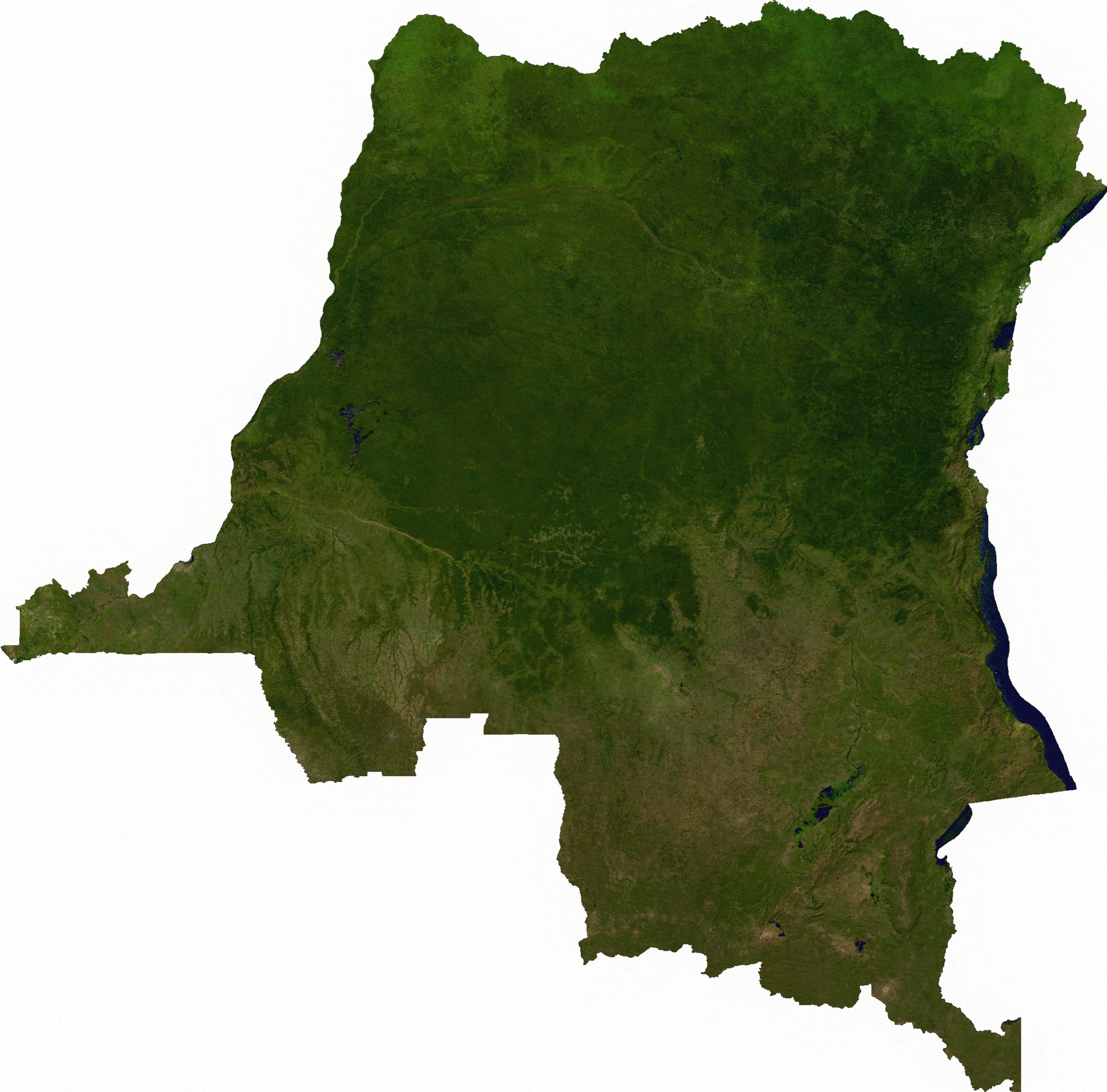
Democratic Republic of the Congo

This is a list of people related to the Democratic Republic of the Congo - Congo (Kinshasa) - the larger of the two Congos, that was also known as Zaire in the 1970s, 80s and 90s.

The list includes non-Congolese people who have had a notable effect on the country during its history.

A separate page contains a List of Democratic Republic of the Congo-related topics.

== B ==
- Dikilu Bageta
- Barly Baruti
- Christian Bassila
- Raymond Ramazani Baya
- M'bilia Bel
- Jean-Pierre Bemba
- Tim Biakabutuka
- Mbala Mbuta Biscotte
- Pierre Marini Bodho
- Bodo (painter)
- Omer Bodson
- Boyenga Bofala
- Ngoy Bomboko
- Amba Bongo
- Anthony Vanden Borre
- José Bosingwa
- Tshimen Bwanga

== C ==
- Francis Chansa
- Jean Cuvelier

== D ==
- Marie Daulne
- Maria de Fonseca
- Isabel Maria de Gama
- Depara
- Larry Devlin
- Olive Lembe di Sita
- Diblo Dibala
- Hassan Djamous

== E ==
- Jirès Kembo Ekoko
- King Kester Emeneya
- Frédéric Etsou-Nzabi-Bamungwabi

== F ==
- Théophile Mbemba Fundu
- André-Philippe Futa

== G ==
- Antoine Ghonda
- Gérard Gifuza
- Antoine Gizenga

== H ==
- Hissène Habré

== I ==
- Atoki Ileka
- Ngasanya Ilongo
- Hérita Ilunga
- Kasongo Ilunga
- Mwepu Ilunga

== K ==
- Maguy Kabamba
- Joseph Kabila
- Laurent-Désiré Kabila
- Jean-Paul Kamudimba Kalala
- Pepe Kalle
- Albert Kalonji
- Dieudonné Kalulika
- Jean Collins Musonda Kalusambo
- Gérard Kamanda wa Kamanda
- Augustin Kambale
- Vital Kamerhe
- Wadel Abdelkader Kamougué
- Loïc Lumbilla Kandja
- Trésor Kandol
- Stanislas Kanengele-Yondjo
- Lokua Kanza
- Jean Nguza Karl-i-Bond
- Nico Kasanda
- Joseph Kasa-Vubu
- Mpinga Kasenda
- Banyingela Kasonga
- Kabwe Kasongo
- Ndandu Kasongo
- Kaysha
- Ya Kid K
- Muteba Kidiaba
- Gary Kikaya
- Évariste Kimba
- Simon Kimbangu
- Papi Kimoto
- Bodys Isek Kingelez
- Christian Kinkela
- Aksanti Kinonoka
- Cyrille Mubiala Kitambala
- Paulin Tokala Kombe
- Vincent Kompany
- Christian Kiwewa
- Antoine Kiwewa
- Nelly Kiwewa
- Blaise Kufo

== L ==
- Goma Lambu
- Leki
- Ray Lema
- Ricardo Lemvo
- Eric Lenge
- Leroy Lita
- Fabrice Lokembo-Lokaso
- Vicky Longomba
- Ntumba Luaba
- Kazenga LuaLua
- Lomana LuaLua
- Thomas Lubanga
- Nono Lubanzadio
- Chiguy Lucau
- Oscar Kashala Lukumuenda
- Roger Lumbala
- Guy-Patrice Lumumba
- Patrice Lumumba
- Trésor Luntala
- Jean-Paul Eale Lutula
- Péguy Luyindula

== M ==
- Mwadi Mabika
- Sifa Mahanya
- Yves Ma-Kalambay
- Claude Makélélé
- Cedric Makiadi
- Francois Luambo Makiadi
- Calvin Zola Makongo
- Ariza Makukula
- Félix Malloum
- Helene Mambu-ma-Disu
- Steve Mandanda
- Sam Mangwana
- Myra Ndjoku Manianga
- Alain Masudi
- Franck Matingou
- Sita-Taty Matondo
- Zola Matumona
- Freddy Matungulu
- Rio Antonio Mavuba
- Jason Mayélé
- Michél Mazingu-Dinzey
- Kimbembe Mazunga
- Nsumbu Mazuwa
- Dieudonné Kayembe Mbandakulu
- Laurent Mbariko
- Marcel Kimemba Mbayo
- Lelo Mbele
- Didier Ilunga Mbenga
- James Dee Kazongo
- Joe Mbu
- Serge Mputu Mbungu
- Mobulu M'Futi
- Mutombo Kalombo Léopold
- Munga Mibindo
- Mutamba Milambo
- Kongulu Mobutu
- Mobutu Sese Seko
- Nzanga Mobutu
- Masena Moke
- Matt Moussilou
- Ritchie Makuma Mpasa
- Émile Mpenza
- Mbo Mpenza
- Merlin Mpiana
- Tresor Mputu
- Msiri
- Fabrice Muamba
- V. Y. Mudimbe
- Gaby Mudingayi
- Salikoko Mufwene
- Jose Mukendi
- Denis Mukwege
- Pierre Mulele
- Youssuf Mulumbu
- Bijou Kisombe Mundaba
- Kiki Musampa
- Félix Mwamba Musasa
- Kabamba Musasa
- Mussasa
- Bibey Mutombo
- Dikembe Mutombo
- Camille Muzinga
- Arnold Mvuemba
- Jean Bosco Mwenda
- Willy Kalombo Mwenze
- Alunga Mwepu
- Ilunga Mwepu

== N ==
- Kangama Ndiwa
- Floribert Ndjabu
- Abdoulaye Yerodia Ndombasi
- Guylain Ndumbu-Nsungu
- Ntema Ndungidi
- Marie-Clémentine Anuarite Nengapeta
- Floribert N'Galula
- Gabriel N'Galula
- Eugène Serufuli Ngayabaseka
- Arthur Z'ahidi Ngoma
- Kisula Ngoy
- Bernadette Ngoyisa
- Lukeni lua Nimi
- Laurent Nkunda
- Kavidi Wivine N'Landu
- Shabani Nonda
- Mayinga N'Seka
- Dituabanza Nsumbu
- Tcham N'Toya
- Antipas Mbusa Nyamwisi
- Yannick Nyanga
- Nyboma
- Hervé Nzelo-Lembi
- Charles N'Zogbia
- Eugène Diomi Ndongala Nzomambu
- Clémentine Nzuji
- Olivier Nzuzi

== O ==
- Koffi Olomide
- Goukouni Oueddei

== P ==
- Passi

== R ==
- Salim Rambo
- Tabu Ley Rochereau
- Helen Roseveare
- Azarias Ruberwa
- Pierre Ryckmans (Congo)

== S ==
- Nyamko Sabuni
- Chéri Samba
- Christopher Samba
- Tonton Semakala

== T ==
- Papy Lukata Shumu
- Koloso Sumaili
- Pierre Pay-Pay wa Syakasighe
- Dikete Tampungu
- Tchicaya U Tam'si
- Mohammed Tchité
- François Tombalbaye
- Kabika Tshilolo
- Tsholola Tshinyama
- Andre Bruno Tshikeva
- Étienne Tshisekedi
- Moise Tshombe
- Cédric Tsimba
- Denis Tsoumou
- Jeff Tutuana

== V ==
- Sheldon B. Vance

== W ==
- Ernest Wamba dia Wamba
- Papa Wemba

== Y ==
- Frederick Kambemba Yamusangie
- Mwata Yamvo
- Yannick Yenga
- Dindo Yogo
- Jeanvion Yulu-Matondo

== Z ==
- Gabriel Zakuani

== See also ==
- List of Democratic Republic of the Congo-related topics
