= 2005 FIFA Confederations Cup squads =

Squads of the 2005 FIFA Confederations Cup played in Germany. Players in Groups A and B are listed below. Nations in Group A and B include: Argentina, Australia, Germany, Tunisia, Brazil, Greece, Japan, Mexico.

== Group A ==
=== Argentina ===
Head coach: (Argentina) José Pékerman

No.	Pos.	Player	Date of birth (age)	Caps	Club
1	GK	Leo Franco	May 20, 1977 (aged 28)	3	(Spain) Atlético Madrid
2	DF	Walter Samuel	March 22, 1978 (aged 27)	46	(Spain) Real Madrid
3	DF	Juan Pablo Sorín (c)	May 5, 1976 (aged 29)	57	(Spain) Villarreal
4	DF	Javier Zanetti	August 10, 1973 (aged 31)	93	(Italy) Internazionale
5	MF	Esteban Cambiasso	August 18, 1980 (aged 24)	12	(Italy) Internazionale
6	DF	Gabriel Heinze	April 19, 1978 (aged 27)	20	(England) Manchester United
7	FW	Carlos Tevez	February 5, 1984 (aged 21)	12	(Brazil) Corinthians
8	MF	Juan Román Riquelme	June 24, 1978 (aged 26)	17	(Spain) Villarreal
9	FW	Javier Saviola	December 11, 1981 (aged 23)	23	(France) Monaco
10	MF	Pablo Aimar	November 3, 1979 (aged 25)	32	(Spain) Valencia
11	FW	César Delgado	August 18, 1981 (aged 23)	17	(Mexico) Cruz Azul
12	GK	Germán Lux	June 7, 1982 (aged 23)	1	(Argentina) River Plate
13	DF	Gonzalo Rodríguez	April 10, 1984 (aged 21)	3	(Spain) Villarreal
14	DF	Gabriel Milito	September 7, 1980 (aged 24)	9	(Spain) Real Zaragoza
15	DF	Diego Placente	April 24, 1977 (aged 28)	22	(Germany) Bayer Leverkusen
16	DF	Fabricio Coloccini	January 22, 1982 (aged 23)	12	(Spain) Deportivo La Coruña
17	MF	Lucas Bernardi	September 27, 1977 (aged 27)	6	(France) Monaco
18	MF	Mario Santana	December 23, 1981 (aged 23)	7	(Italy) Palermo
19	MF	Maxi Rodríguez	January 2, 1981 (aged 24)	12	(Spain) Espanyol
20	DF	Martín Demichelis	December 20, 1980 (aged 24)	2	(Germany) Bayern Munich
21	FW	Luciano Figueroa	May 19, 1981 (aged 24)	15	(Spain) Villarreal
22	MF	Luciano Galletti	April 9, 1980 (aged 25)	13	(Spain) Real Zaragoza
23	GK	Willy Caballero	September 28, 1981 (aged 23)	0	(Spain) Elche

=== Australia ===
Head coach: (Australia) Frank Farina

No.	Pos.	Player	Date of birth (age)	Caps	Club
1	GK	Mark Schwarzer	October 6, 1972 (aged 32)		(England) Middlesbrough
2	DF	Kevin Muscat	August 7, 1973 (aged 31)		(England) Millwall
3	DF	Craig Moore (c)	December 12, 1975 (aged 29)		(Germany) Borussia Mönchengladbach
4	DF	Lucas Neill	March 9, 1978 (aged 27)		(England) Blackburn Rovers
5	DF	Tony Vidmar	July 4, 1970 (aged 34)		(Wales) Cardiff City
6	DF	Tony Popovic	July 4, 1973 (aged 31)		(England) Crystal Palace
7	MF	Brett Emerton	February 22, 1979 (aged 26)		(England) Blackburn Rovers
8	MF	Josip Skoko	December 10, 1975 (aged 29)		(Turkey) Gençlerbirliği
9	FW	Mark Viduka	October 9, 1975 (aged 29)		(England) Middlesbrough
10	MF	Tim Cahill	December 6, 1979 (aged 25)		(England) Everton
11	MF	Scott Chipperfield	December 30, 1975 (aged 29)		(Switzerland) Basel
12	GK	Michael Petkovic	July 16, 1976 (aged 28)		(Turkey) Trabzonspor
13	MF	Luke Wilkshire	October 2, 1981 (aged 23)		(England) Bristol City
14	DF	Simon Colosimo	January 8, 1979 (aged 26)		(Australia) Perth Glory
15	FW	John Aloisi	February 5, 1976 (aged 29)		(Spain) Osasuna
16	FW	David Zdrilic	April 13, 1974 (aged 31)		(Australia) Sydney FC
17	DF	Jonathan McKain	September 21, 1982 (aged 22)		(Romania) Național București
18	GK	Zeljko Kalac	December 16, 1972 (aged 32)		(Italy) Perugia
19	MF	Jason Culina	August 5, 1980 (aged 24)		(Netherlands) Twente
20	DF	Ljubo Milicevic	February 13, 1981 (aged 24)		(Switzerland) Thun
21	MF	Ahmad Elrich	May 30, 1981 (aged 24)		(England) Fulham
22	FW	Archie Thompson	October 23, 1978 (aged 26)		(Belgium) Lierse
23	MF	Mile Sterjovski	May 27, 1979 (aged 26)		(Switzerland) Basel

=== Germany ===
Head coach: (Germany) Jürgen Klinsmann

No.	Pos.	Player	Date of birth (age)	Caps	Club
1	GK	Oliver Kahn	June 15, 1969 (aged 36)	78	(Germany) Bayern Munich
2	DF	Andreas Hinkel	March 26, 1982 (aged 23)	13	(Germany) VfB Stuttgart
3	DF	Arne Friedrich	May 29, 1979 (aged 26)	26	(Germany) Hertha BSC
4	DF	Robert Huth	August 18, 1984 (aged 20)	6	(England) Chelsea
5	DF	Patrick Owomoyela	November 5, 1979 (aged 25)	6	(Germany) Arminia Bielefeld
6	MF	Marco Engelhardt	December 2, 1980 (aged 24)	2	(Germany) 1. FC Kaiserslautern
7	MF	Bastian Schweinsteiger	August 1, 1984 (aged 20)	14	(Germany) Bayern Munich
8	MF	Torsten Frings	November 22, 1976 (aged 28)	39	(Germany) Bayern Munich
9	FW	Mike Hanke	November 5, 1983 (aged 21)	1	(Germany) Schalke 04
10	MF	Sebastian Deisler	January 5, 1980 (aged 25)	24	(Germany) Bayern Munich
11	FW	Thomas Brdarić	January 23, 1975 (aged 30)	8	(Germany) VfL Wolfsburg
12	GK	Jens Lehmann	November 10, 1969 (aged 35)	23	(England) Arsenal
13	MF	Michael Ballack (c)	September 26, 1976 (aged 28)	53	(Germany) Bayern Munich
14	FW	Gerald Asamoah	October 3, 1978 (aged 26)	28	(Germany) Schalke 04
15	MF	Fabian Ernst	May 20, 1979 (aged 26)	16	(Germany) Werder Bremen
16	MF	Thomas Hitzlsperger	April 5, 1982 (aged 23)	6	(England) Aston Villa
17	DF	Per Mertesacker	September 29, 1984 (aged 20)	7	(Germany) Hannover 96
18	MF	Tim Borowski	May 2, 1980 (aged 25)	9	(Germany) Werder Bremen
19	MF	Bernd Schneider	November 17, 1973 (aged 31)	48	(Germany) Bayer Leverkusen
20	MF	Lukas Podolski	June 4, 1985 (aged 20)	11	(Germany) 1. FC Köln
21	DF	Christian Schulz	April 1, 1983 (aged 22)	3	(Germany) Werder Bremen
22	FW	Kevin Kurányi	March 2, 1982 (aged 23)	24	(Germany) VfB Stuttgart
23	GK	Timo Hildebrand	April 5, 1979 (aged 26)	2	(Germany) VfB Stuttgart

=== Tunisia ===
Head coach: (France) Roger Lemerre

No.	Pos.	Player	Date of birth (age)	Caps	Club
1	GK	Ali Boumnijel	April 13, 1966 (aged 39)		(Tunisia) Africain
2	DF	Karim Saidi	March 24, 1983 (aged 22)		(Netherlands) Feyenoord
3	FW	Karim Essediri	July 29, 1979 (aged 25)		(Norway) Tromsø
4	DF	Wisam El Abdy	April 2, 1979 (aged 26)		(Tunisia) Sfaxien
5	FW	Ziad Jaziri	July 12, 1978 (aged 26)		(Turkey) Gaziantepspor
6	DF	Hatem Trabelsi (c)	January 25, 1977 (aged 28)		(Netherlands) Ajax
7	FW	Imed Mhedhebi	March 22, 1976 (aged 29)		(Tunisia) Étoile du Sahel
8	MF	Mehdi Nafti	November 28, 1978 (aged 26)		(England) Birmingham City
9	FW	Haykel Guemamdia	December 22, 1981 (aged 23)		(Tunisia) Sfaxien
10	MF	Kaies Ghodhbane	January 7, 1976 (aged 29)		(Turkey) Samsunspor
11	FW	Francileudo Santos	March 20, 1979 (aged 26)		(France) Sochaux
12	MF	Jawhar Mnari	November 8, 1976 (aged 28)		(Tunisia) Espérance de Tunis
13	MF	Hamed Namouchi	February 14, 1984 (aged 21)		(Scotland) Rangers
14	MF	Adel Chedli	September 16, 1976 (aged 28)		(France) Istres
15	DF	Radhi Jaïdi	August 30, 1975 (aged 29)		(England) Bolton Wanderers
16	GK	Khaled Fadhel	September 29, 1976 (aged 28)		(Turkey) Diyarbakırspor
17	MF	Chaouki Ben Saada	July 1, 1984 (aged 20)		(France) Bastia
18	MF	Selim Benachour	September 8, 1981 (aged 23)		(France) Paris Saint-Germain
19	DF	Anis Ayari	February 16, 1982 (aged 23)		(Turkey) Samsunspor
20	DF	José Clayton	March 21, 1974 (aged 31)		(Tunisia) Espérance de Tunis
21	FW	Issam Jemâa	January 28, 1984 (aged 21)		(Tunisia) Espérance de Tunis
22	GK	Hamdi Kasraoui	February 18, 1983 (aged 22)		(Tunisia) Espérance de Tunis
23	DF	Amir Haj Massaoud	February 8, 1981 (aged 24)		(Tunisia) Sfaxien

== Group B ==
=== Brazil ===
Head coach: (Brazil) Carlos Alberto Parreira

Ronaldinho assumed captaincy from Roque Júnior from the second group game onwards.

No.	Pos.	Player	Date of birth (age)	Caps	Club
1	GK	Dida	October 7, 1973 (aged 31)		(Italy) Milan
2	DF	Maicon	July 26, 1981 (aged 23)		(France) Monaco
3	DF	Lúcio	May 8, 1978 (aged 27)		(Germany) Bayern Munich
4	DF	Roque Júnior	August 31, 1976 (aged 28)		(Germany) Bayer Leverkusen
5	MF	Emerson	April 4, 1976 (aged 29)		(Italy) Juventus
6	DF	Gilberto	April 25, 1976 (aged 29)		(Germany) Hertha BSC
7	FW	Robinho	January 25, 1984 (aged 21)		(Brazil) Santos
8	MF	Kaká	April 22, 1982 (aged 23)		(Italy) Milan
9	FW	Adriano	February 17, 1982 (aged 23)		(Italy) Internazionale
10	MF	Ronaldinho (c)	March 21, 1980 (aged 25)		(Spain) Barcelona
11	MF	Zé Roberto	July 6, 1974 (aged 30)		(Germany) Bayern Munich
12	GK	Marcos	August 4, 1973 (aged 31)		(Brazil) Palmeiras
13	DF	Cicinho	June 24, 1980 (aged 24)		(Brazil) São Paulo
14	DF	Juan	February 1, 1979 (aged 26)		(Germany) Bayer Leverkusen
15	DF	Luisão	February 13, 1981 (aged 24)		(Portugal) Benfica
16	DF	Léo	July 6, 1975 (aged 29)		(Portugal) Benfica
17	MF	Gilberto Silva	October 7, 1976 (aged 28)		(England) Arsenal
18	MF	Juninho	January 30, 1975 (aged 30)		(France) Lyon
19	MF	Renato	May 15, 1979 (aged 26)		(Spain) Sevilla
20	FW	Júlio Baptista	October 1, 1981 (aged 23)		(Spain) Sevilla
21	FW	Ricardo Oliveira	May 6, 1980 (aged 25)		(Spain) Real Betis
22	MF	Edu	May 15, 1978 (aged 27)		(England) Arsenal
23	GK	Heurelho Gomes	February 15, 1981 (aged 24)		(Netherlands) PSV

=== Greece ===
Head coach: (Germany) Otto Rehhagel

No.	Pos.	Player	Date of birth (age)	Caps	Club
1	GK	Antonios Nikopolidis	January 14, 1971 (aged 34)		(Greece) Olympiacos
2	DF	Giourkas Seitaridis	June 4, 1981 (aged 24)		(Portugal) Porto
3	DF	Loukas Vyntra	May 2, 1981 (aged 24)		(Greece) Panathinaikos
4	DF	Stathis Tavlaridis	January 25, 1980 (aged 25)		(France) Lille
5	DF	Sotirios Kyrgiakos	July 23, 1979 (aged 25)		(Scotland) Rangers
6	MF	Angelos Basinas	July 3, 1976 (aged 28)		(Greece) Panathinaikos
7	MF	Theodoros Zagorakis (c)	October 27, 1971 (aged 33)		(Italy) Bologna
8	FW	Stelios Giannakopoulos	July 12, 1974 (aged 30)		(England) Bolton Wanderers
9	FW	Angelos Charisteas	February 9, 1980 (aged 25)		(Netherlands) Ajax
10	MF	Vasilios Tsiartas	November 12, 1972 (aged 32)		(Germany) 1. FC Köln
11	FW	Dimitrios Papadopoulos	October 20, 1981 (aged 23)		(Greece) Panathinaikos
12	GK	Kostas Chalkias	May 30, 1974 (aged 31)		(England) Portsmouth
13	GK	Michalis Sifakis	September 11, 1984 (aged 20)		(Greece) OFI
14	DF	Takis Fyssas	June 12, 1973 (aged 32)		(Portugal) Benfica
15	FW	Zisis Vryzas	November 9, 1973 (aged 31)		(Spain) Celta Vigo
16	MF	Pantelis Kafes	June 24, 1978 (aged 26)		(Greece) Olympiacos
17	FW	Ioannis Amanatidis	December 3, 1981 (aged 23)		(Germany) 1. FC Kaiserslautern
18	DF	Giannis Goumas	May 24, 1975 (aged 30)		(Greece) Panathinaikos
19	DF	Michalis Kapsis	October 18, 1973 (aged 31)		(France) Bordeaux
20	MF	Giorgos Karagounis	March 6, 1977 (aged 28)		(Italy) Inter Milan
21	DF	Kostas Katsouranis	June 21, 1979 (aged 25)		(Greece) AEK Athens
22	FW	Theofanis Gekas	May 23, 1980 (aged 25)		(Greece) Panathinaikos
23	MF	Vasilios Lakis	September 10, 1976 (aged 28)		(England) Crystal Palace

=== Japan ===
Head coach: (Brazil) Zico

No.	Pos.	Player	Date of birth (age)	Caps	Goals	Club
1	GK	Seigo Narazaki	April 11, 1976 (aged 29)	48	0	(Japan Football Association) Nagoya Grampus
2	DF	Makoto Tanaka	August 8, 1975 (aged 29)	22	0	(Japan Football Association) Júbilo Iwata
3	DF	Takayuki Chano	November 23, 1976 (aged 28)	4	0	(Japan Football Association) JEF United Chiba
4	MF	Yasuhito Endō	January 28, 1980 (aged 25)	33	3	(Japan Football Association) Gamba Osaka
5	DF	Tsuneyasu Miyamoto (c)	February 7, 1977 (aged 28)	53	3	(Japan Football Association) Gamba Osaka
6	MF	Kōji Nakata	July 9, 1979 (aged 25)	49	2	(French Football Federation) Marseille
7	MF	Hidetoshi Nakata	January 22, 1977 (aged 28)	64	10	(Italian Football Federation) Fiorentina
8	MF	Mitsuo Ogasawara	April 5, 1979 (aged 26)	36	5	(Japan Football Association) Kashima Antlers
9	FW	Keiji Tamada	April 11, 1980 (aged 25)	26	5	(Japan Football Association) Kashiwa Reysol
10	MF	Shunsuke Nakamura	June 24, 1978 (aged 26)	50	12	(Italian Football Federation) Reggina
11	FW	Takayuki Suzuki	June 5, 1976 (aged 29)	52	11	(Japan Football Association) Kashima Antlers
12	GK	Yoichi Doi	July 25, 1973 (aged 31)	2	0	(Japan Football Association) FC Tokyo
13	FW	Atsushi Yanagisawa	May 27, 1977 (aged 28)	47	14	(Italian Football Federation) Messina
14	DF	Alessandro Santos	July 20, 1977 (aged 27)	53	5	(Japan Football Association) Urawa Red Diamonds
15	MF	Takashi Fukunishi	September 1, 1976 (aged 28)	48	6	(Japan Football Association) Júbilo Iwata
16	FW	Masashi Oguro	May 4, 1980 (aged 25)	6	2	(Japan Football Association) Gamba Osaka
17	MF	Atsuhiro Miura	June 24, 1974 (aged 30)	25	1	(Japan Football Association) Vissel Kobe
18	MF	Junichi Inamoto	September 18, 1979 (aged 25)		4	(The Football Association) West Bromwich Albion
19	MF	Masashi Motoyama	June 20, 1979 (aged 25)	22	0	(Japan Football Association) Kashima Antlers
20	DF	Keisuke Tsuboi	September 16, 1979 (aged 25)	24	0	(Japan Football Association) Urawa Red Diamonds
21	DF	Akira Kaji	January 13, 1980 (aged 25)	29	0	(Japan Football Association) FC Tokyo
22	DF	Teruyuki Moniwa	September 8, 1981 (aged 23)	3	0	(Japan Football Association) FC Tokyo
23	GK	Yoshikatsu Kawaguchi	August 15, 1975 (aged 29)	73	0	(Japan Football Association) Júbilo Iwata

=== Mexico ===
Head coach: (Argentina) Ricardo La Volpe

No.	Pos.	Player	Date of birth (age)	Caps	Club
1	GK	Oswaldo Sánchez	September 21, 1973 (aged 31)		(Mexico) Guadalajara
2	DF	Aarón Galindo	May 8, 1982 (aged 23)		(Mexico) Cruz Azul
3	DF	Carlos Salcido	April 2, 1980 (aged 25)		(Mexico) Guadalajara
4	DF	Rafael Márquez (c)	February 13, 1979 (aged 26)		(Spain) Barcelona
5	DF	Ricardo Osorio	March 30, 1980 (aged 25)		(Mexico) Cruz Azul
6	MF	Gerardo Torrado	April 30, 1979 (aged 26)		(Mexico) Cruz Azul
7	MF	Sinha	May 23, 1976 (aged 29)		(Mexico) Toluca
8	MF	Pável Pardo	July 26, 1976 (aged 28)		(Mexico) América
9	FW	Jared Borgetti	August 14, 1974 (aged 30)		(Mexico) Pachuca
10	FW	Omar Bravo	March 4, 1980 (aged 25)		(Mexico) Guadalajara
11	MF	Ramón Morales	October 10, 1975 (aged 29)		(Mexico) Guadalajara
12	GK	Moisés Muñoz	February 1, 1980 (aged 25)		(Mexico) Monarcas Morelia
13	FW	Rafael Márquez Lugo	November 2, 1981 (aged 23)		(Mexico) Monarcas Morelia
14	MF	Gonzalo Pineda	October 19, 1982 (aged 22)		(Mexico) UNAM
15	DF	Hugo Sánchez Guerrero	May 8, 1981 (aged 24)		(Mexico) Tigres UANL
16	DF	Mario Méndez	June 1, 1979 (aged 26)		(Mexico) Toluca
17	FW	Francisco Fonseca	October 2, 1979 (aged 25)		(Mexico) Cruz Azul
18	DF	Salvador Carmona	August 22, 1976 (aged 28)		(Mexico) Cruz Azul
19	FW	Alberto Medina	May 29, 1983 (aged 22)		(Mexico) Guadalajara
20	MF	Juan Pablo Rodríguez	August 7, 1979 (aged 25)		(Mexico) Tecos UAG
21	MF	Jaime Lozano	September 29, 1979 (aged 25)		(Mexico) UNAM
22	MF	Luis Ernesto Pérez	January 12, 1981 (aged 24)		(Mexico) Monterrey
23	GK	Jesús Corona	January 26, 1981 (aged 24)		(Mexico) Tecos UAG

== Player statistics ==
Player representation by club nationality

Players	Nations
30	Germany
22	Mexico
21	England
18	Japan, Spain
14	Italy
11	France
9	Tunisia, Greece

* Nations in italics are not represented by their national teams in the tournament.
