= 2005 FIFA Confederations Cup Group A =

Football tournament group stage

Group A of the 2005 FIFA Confederations Cup took place between 15 June and 21 June 2005. Hosts Germany won the group, and advanced to the second round, along with Argentina. Tunisia and Australia failed to advance.

== Standings ==
Pos	Team	Pld	W	D	L	GF	GA	GD	Pts	Qualification
1	Germany (H)	3	2	1	0	9	5	+4	7	Advance to knockout stage
2	Argentina	3	2	1	0	8	5	+3	7	Advance to knockout stage
3	Tunisia	3	1	0	2	3	5	−2	3	
4	Australia	3	0	0	3	5	10	−5	0	

(H) Hosts

All times local (CEST/UTC+2)

== Matches ==
=== Argentina v Tunisia ===
15 June 2005
18:00

Argentina	2–1	Tunisia
Riquelme 33' (pen.); Saviola 57'	Report	Guemamdia 72' (pen.)

RheinEnergieStadion, Cologne
Attendance: 28,033
Referee: Roberto Rosetti (Italy)

Argentina	Tunisia

GK	12	Germán Lux	(yellow card) 71'
CB	16	Fabricio Coloccini
CB	13	Gonzalo Rodríguez	(yellow card) 17'
CB	6	Gabriel Heinze
RM	19	Maxi Rodríguez
CM	17	Lucas Bernardi
LM	3	Juan Pablo Sorín (c)		(substituted off) 79'
RW	22	Luciano Galletti
AM	8	Juan Román Riquelme
LW	18	Mario Santana
CF	9	Javier Saviola		(substituted off) 66'
Substitutions:
FW	7	Carlos Tevez		(substituted on) 66'
DF	4	Javier Zanetti		(substituted on) 79'
Manager:
José Pékerman

GK	16	Khaled Fadhel
RB	6	Hatem Trabelsi (c)	(yellow card) 32'	(substituted off) 46'
CB	2	Karim Saidi
CB	15	Radhi Jaïdi	(yellow card) 80'
LB	19	Anis Ayari
RM	12	Jawhar Mnari
CM	14	Adel Chedli
LM	18	Selim Benachour
RW	3	Karim Essediri
LW	7	Imed Mhedhebi		(substituted off) 46'
CF	9	Haykel Guemamdia		(substituted off) 78'
Substitutions:
DF	23	Amir Haj Massaoud		(substituted on) 46'
FW	11	Francileudo Santos		(substituted on) 46'
FW	5	Ziad Jaziri		(substituted on) 78'
Manager:
(France) Roger Lemerre

Man of the Match:
Juan Román Riquelme (Argentina)

Assistant referees:
Alessandro Griselli (Italy)
Cristiano Copelli (Italy)
Fourth official:
Manuel Mejuto González (Spain)

=== Germany v Australia ===
15 June 2005
21:00

Germany	4–3	Australia
Kurányi 17'; Mertesacker 23'; Ballack 60' (pen.); Podolski 88'	Report	Skoko 21'; Aloisi 31', 90+2'

Waldstadion, Frankfurt
Attendance: 46,466
Referee: Carlos Amarilla (Paraguay)

Germany	Australia

GK	1	Oliver Kahn
RB	3	Arne Friedrich	(yellow card) 69'
CB	4	Robert Huth	(yellow card) 20'
CB	17	Per Mertesacker
LB	16	Thomas Hitzlsperger
RM	19	Bernd Schneider		(substituted off) 76'
CM	8	Torsten Frings
CM	13	Michael Ballack (c)	(yellow card) 90+3'
LM	7	Bastian Schweinsteiger	(yellow card) 51'	(substituted off) 83'
CF	22	Kevin Kurányi		(substituted off) 68'
CF	20	Lukas Podolski
Substitutions:
FW	14	Gerald Asamoah		(substituted on) 68'
MF	10	Sebastian Deisler		(substituted on) 76'
MF	15	Fabian Ernst		(substituted on) 83'
Manager:
Jürgen Klinsmann

GK	1	Mark Schwarzer
CB	2	Kevin Muscat
CB	3	Craig Moore (c)
CB	6	Tony Popovic		(substituted off) 57'
DM	4	Lucas Neill
RM	7	Brett Emerton
CM	20	Ljubo Milicevic	(yellow card) 38'
CM	8	Josip Skoko
LM	11	Scott Chipperfield		(substituted off) 83'
SS	10	Tim Cahill		(substituted off) 74'
CF	15	John Aloisi
Substitutions:
DF	17	Jonathan McKain		(substituted on) 57'
MF	19	Jason Culina		(substituted on) 74'
FW	22	Archie Thompson		(substituted on) 83'
Manager:
Frank Farina

Man of the Match:
Michael Ballack (Germany)

Assistant referees:
Amelio Andino (Paraguay)
Manuel Bernal (Paraguay)
Fourth official:
Mourad Daami (Tunisia)

=== Tunisia v Germany ===
18 June 2005
18:00

Tunisia	0–3	Germany
	Report	Ballack 74' (pen.); Schweinsteiger 80'; Hanke 88'

RheinEnergieStadion, Cologne
Attendance: 44,377
Referee: Peter Prendergast (Jamaica)

Tunisia	Germany

GK	1	Ali Boumnijel
RB	6	Hatem Trabelsi (c)
CB	4	Wisam El Abdy	(yellow card) 73'
CB	15	Radhi Jaïdi	(yellow card) 5'
LB	20	José Clayton
RM	8	Mehdi Nafti
CM	12	Jawhar Mnari
CM	10	Kaies Ghodhbane		(substituted off) 59'
LM	14	Adel Chedli
CF	5	Ziad Jaziri		(substituted off) 83'
CF	11	Francileudo Santos
Substitutions:
FW	13	Hamed Namouchi		(substituted on) 59'
FW	17	Chaouki Ben Saada		(substituted on) 83'
Manager:
(France) Roger Lemerre

GK	12	Jens Lehmann
RB	3	Arne Friedrich	(yellow card) 22'
CB	4	Robert Huth
CB	17	Per Mertesacker
LB	16	Thomas Hitzlsperger		(substituted off) 68'
RM	10	Sebastian Deisler
CM	8	Torsten Frings
CM	13	Michael Ballack (c)
LM	7	Bastian Schweinsteiger
CF	14	Gerald Asamoah		(substituted off) 62'
CF	20	Lukas Podolski		(substituted off) 87'
Substitutions:
FW	22	Kevin Kurányi		(substituted on) 62'
MF	19	Bernd Schneider		(substituted on) 68'
FW	9	Mike Hanke		(substituted on) 87'
Manager:
Jürgen Klinsmann

Man of the Match:
Michael Ballack (Germany)

Assistant referees:
Anthony Garwood (Jamaica)
Joseph Taylor (Trinidad and Tobago)
Fourth official:
Matthew Breeze (Australia)

=== Australia v Argentina ===
18 June 2005
20:45

Australia	2–4	Argentina
Aloisi 61' (pen.), 70'	Report	Figueroa 12', 53', 89'; Riquelme 31' (pen.)

Frankenstadion, Nuremberg
Attendance: 25,618
Referee: Shamsul Maidin (Singapore)

Australia	Argentina

GK	1	Mark Schwarzer
RB	2	Kevin Muscat		(substituted off) 46'
CB	3	Craig Moore (c)	(yellow card) 90+1'
CB	5	Tony Vidmar
LB	4	Lucas Neill	(yellow card) 30'
CM	20	Ljubo Milicevic		(substituted off) 56'
CM	8	Josip Skoko		(substituted off) 74'
RW	7	Brett Emerton	(yellow card) 43'
AM	10	Tim Cahill	(yellow card) 49'
LW	11	Scott Chipperfield
CF	15	John Aloisi
Substitutions:
FW	9	Mark Viduka		(substituted on) 46'
DF	17	Jonathan McKain		(substituted on) 56'
MF	19	Jason Culina		(substituted on) 74'
Manager:
Frank Farina

GK	12	Germán Lux
RB	4	Javier Zanetti
CB	16	Fabricio Coloccini		(substituted off) 86'
CB	2	Walter Samuel	(yellow card) 10'
LB	6	Gabriel Heinze
RM	18	Mario Santana		(substituted off) 66'
CM	17	Lucas Bernardi
CM	8	Juan Román Riquelme
LM	3	Juan Pablo Sorín (c)
CF	21	Luciano Figueroa
CF	9	Javier Saviola		(substituted off) 73'
Substitutions:
MF	5	Esteban Cambiasso		(substituted on) 66'
MF	10	Pablo Aimar		(substituted on) 73'
DF	13	Gonzalo Rodríguez		(substituted on) 86'
Manager:
José Pékerman

Man of the Match:
Luciano Figueroa (Argentina)

Assistant referees:
Prachya Permpanich (Thailand)
Bengech Allaberdyev (Turkmenistan)
Fourth official:
Manuel Mejuto González (Spain)

=== Australia v Tunisia ===
21 June 2005
20:45

Australia	0–2	Tunisia
	Report	Santos 26', 70'

Zentralstadion, Leipzig
Attendance: 23,952
Referee: Carlos Chandía (Chile)

Australia	Tunisia

GK	12	Michael Petkovic
RB	4	Lucas Neill
CB	3	Craig Moore (c)
CB	5	Tony Vidmar
LB	14	Simon Colosimo	(yellow card) 39'
RM	19	Jason Culina
CM	8	Josip Skoko		(substituted off) 61'
CM	17	Jonathan McKain	(yellow card) 25'
LM	11	Scott Chipperfield		(substituted off) 38'
CF	9	Mark Viduka		(substituted off) 46'
CF	15	John Aloisi
Substitutions:
DF	20	Ljubo Milicevic		(substituted on) 38'
FW	22	Archie Thompson	(yellow card) 90'	(substituted on) 46'
MF	10	Tim Cahill	(yellow card) 62'	(substituted on) 61'
Manager:
Frank Farina

GK	22	Hamdi Kasraoui
RB	6	Hatem Trabelsi (c)
CB	2	Karim Saidi
CB	12	Jawhar Mnari
LB	19	Anis Ayari	(yellow card) 88'
RM	13	Hamed Namouchi
CM	8	Mehdi Nafti
CM	17	Chaouki Ben Saada	(yellow card) 28'	(substituted off) 69'
LM	14	Adel Chedli		(substituted off) 55'
CF	11	Francileudo Santos	(substituted off) 89'
CF	9	Haykel Guemamdia
Substitutions:
FW	21	Issam Jemâa		(substituted on) 55'
MF	10	Kaies Ghodhbane		(substituted on) 69'
FW	5	Ziad Jaziri		(substituted on) 89'
Manager:
(France) Roger Lemerre

Man of the Match:
Francileudo Santos (Tunisia)

Assistant referees:
Cristian Julio (Chile)
Mario Vargas (Chile)
Fourth official:
Herbert Fandel (Germany)

=== Argentina v Germany ===
21 June 2005
20:45

Argentina	2–2	Germany
Riquelme 33'; Cambiasso 74'	Report	Kurányi 29'; Asamoah 51'

Frankenstadion, Nuremberg
Attendance: 42,088
Referee: Ľuboš Micheľ (Slovakia)

Argentina	Germany

GK	12	Germán Lux
RB	4	Javier Zanetti
CB	16	Fabricio Coloccini
CB	2	Walter Samuel	(yellow card) 28'	(substituted off) 62'
LB	6	Gabriel Heinze
RM	8	Juan Román Riquelme
CM	17	Lucas Bernardi	(yellow card) 41'	(substituted off) 53'
CM	5	Esteban Cambiasso
LM	3	Juan Pablo Sorín (c)
CF	21	Luciano Figueroa
CF	7	Carlos Tevez		(substituted off) 80'
Substitutions:
MF	10	Pablo Aimar		(substituted on) 53'
MF	18	Mario Santana		(substituted on) 62'
FW	11	César Delgado		(substituted on) 80'
Manager:
José Pékerman

GK	23	Timo Hildebrand
RB	2	Andreas Hinkel
CB	4	Robert Huth
CB	17	Per Mertesacker
LB	16	Thomas Hitzlsperger
CM	15	Fabian Ernst
CM	7	Bastian Schweinsteiger	(yellow card) 48'	(substituted off) 70'
RW	14	Gerald Asamoah		(substituted off) 58'
AM	10	Sebastian Deisler	(yellow card) 40'
LW	19	Bernd Schneider (c)		(substituted off) 46'
CF	22	Kevin Kurányi	(yellow card) 7'
Substitutions:
MF	8	Torsten Frings		(substituted on) 46'
FW	9	Mike Hanke		(substituted on) 58'
MF	6	Marco Engelhardt		(substituted on) 70'
Manager:
Jürgen Klinsmann

Man of the Match:
Juan Román Riquelme (Argentina)

Assistant referees:
Roman Slyško (Slovakia)
Martin Balko (Slovakia)
Fourth official:
Roberto Rosetti (Italy)
