= Tunisia at the FIFA Confederations Cup =

Participation of Tunisia in a competition

Tunisia has participated one times in the FIFA Confederations Cup in 2005, as a representative from Africa after winning the 2004 African Cup of Nations. From its only participation, the team was content with the group stage. The team played in Group A against Argentina, Germany and Australia. The team lost to Argentina 1–2 and Germany 0–3, while it defeated Australia 2–0.

== Overall record ==
FIFA Confederations Cup record
Year	Round	Position	Pld	W	D*	L	GF	GA	Squad	Ref
(Saudi Arabia) 1992	Did not qualify									
(Saudi Arabia) 1995	Did not qualify									
(Saudi Arabia) 1997	Did not qualify									
(Mexico) 1999	Did not qualify									
(South Korea) (Japan) 2001	Did not qualify									
(France) 2003	Did not qualify									
(Germany) 2005	Group stage	6th	3	1	0	2	3	5	Squad	
(South Africa) 2009	Did not qualify									
(Brazil) 2013	Did not qualify									
(Russia) 2017	Did not qualify									
Total	Group stage	1/10	3	1	0	2	3	5	—	—

== Matches ==
Part	Year	No.	Stage	Date	Opponent	Result	Tunisia scorers	Ref
1	(Germany) 2005	1	Group stage	15 June 2005	Argentina	1–2	Guemamdia 72' (pen.)	
1	(Germany) 2005	2	Group stage	18 June 2005	Germany	0–3	—	
1	(Germany) 2005	3	Group stage	21 June 2005	Australia	2–0	Santos 26', 70'	

== Tournaments ==
=== 2005 FIFA Confederations Cup ===
The Tunisian team, winning their first African Cup of Nations title, enabled them to qualify for the 2005 FIFA Confederations Cup in Germany, where they participated in Group A including hosts Germany, Argentina and Australia. The opening match of this tournament was between Tunisia and Argentina, Tunisia lost by a narrow margin 1–2, Haykel Guemamdia scored Tunisia's goal. In the second match, the Tunisians resisted until the 74th minute, where they conceded three goals from the German team, while in the third match they managed to beat Australia 2–0 with Francileudo Santos double, to leave good impressions.

==== Group stage ====
Pos	Team	Pld	W	D	L	GF	GA	GD	Pts	Qualification
1	Germany (H)	3	2	1	0	9	5	+4	7	Advance to knockout stage
2	Argentina	3	2	1	0	8	5	+3	7	Advance to knockout stage
3	Tunisia	3	1	0	2	3	5	−2	3	
4	Australia	3	0	0	3	5	10	−5	0	

(H) Hosts
15 June 2005
18:00

Argentina	2–1	Tunisia
Riquelme 33' (pen.); Saviola 57'	Report	Guemamdia 72' (pen.)

RheinEnergieStadion, Cologne
Attendance: 28,033
Referee: Roberto Rosetti (Italy)

18 June 2005
18:00

Tunisia	0–3	Germany
	Report	Ballack 74' (pen.); Schweinsteiger 80'; Hanke 88'

RheinEnergieStadion, Cologne
Attendance: 44,377
Referee: Peter Prendergast (Jamaica)

21 June 2005
20:45

Australia	0–2	Tunisia
	Report	Santos 26', 70'

Zentralstadion, Leipzig
Attendance: 23,952
Referee: Carlos Chandía (Chile)

== Statistics ==
=== Head to head ===
- – Positive balance
- – Neutral balance
- – Negative balance

Versus	Pld	W	D	L	GF	GA	Def	First match date	Last match date
Argentina	1	0	0	1	1	2	–1	15 June 2005	15 June 2005
Australia	1	1	0	0	2	0	+2	21 June 2005	21 June 2005
Germany	1	0	0	1	0	3	–3	18 June 2005	18 June 2005
Total	3	1	0	2	3	5	–2	15 June 2005	18 June 2005

=== Goalscorers ===
Rank	Player	2005	Goals
1	Francileudo Santos	2	2
2	Haykel Guemamdia	1	1
Total		3	3

– Best goalscorer(s) of the tournament

– Best goalscorer(s) of the team

== Awards ==
Man of the match

- 2005: Francileudo Santos (vs. Australia; Group A)

== Kits ==
2005 FIFA Confederations Cup
Home	Away

== See also ==
- Tunisia at the FIFA World Cup
- Tunisia at the Africa Cup of Nations
- Tunisia at the African Nations Championship
- Tunisia at the FIFA Arab Cup
