= Haliru =

Haliru is a name. Notable people with this name include:

- Haliru Akilu (born 1947), Nigerian general
- Haliru Alhassan (1954–2020), Nigerian medical doctor and politician
- Haliru Alidu (born 1984), Togolese football midfielder
- Haliru Dantoro (1938=2015), Nigerian traditional ruler and politician
- Haliru Mohammed Bello (born 1945), Nigerian politician
- Haliru Zakari Jikantoro, Nigerian politician
