= Musasa =

Musasa may refer to:

- Musasa language, a language related to the Eastern Indic Bihari languages group
- Félix Mwamba Musasa (born 1976), Congolese footballer
- Kabamba Musasa (born 1982), Congolese footballer
- a shelter hunters would build while away from their homes : see Mbira music

== See also ==
- Msasa, a common name for Brachystegia spiciformis, a medium-sized African tree
