= Zakari (name) =

Zakari is both a given name and a surname. Notable people with the name include:

- Zakari Gourouza (born 1982), Nigerien judoka
- Zakari Lambo (born 1976), Nigerien footballer
- Zakari Morou (born 1991), Togolese footballer
- Zakari Nandja, Togolese politician
- Aziz Zakari (born 1976), Ghanaian athlete
- Danladi Mohammed Zakari, Nigerian general

== See also ==
- Haliru Zakari Jikantoro, Nigerian politician
