= Okwo =

Okwo is an African surname. Notable people with this surname include:

- Jean Marie Okwo Bele (born 1957), Congolese physician and epidemiologist
- Michael Okwo (born 1985), British-American American football player
- Mildred Okwo (born 1966), Nigerian film director and producer
