= Sékouba Camara =

Sékouba Camara may refer to:

- Sékouba Camara (footballer, born 1983), Guinean football defender
- Sékouba Camara (footballer, born 1997), Guinean football goalkeeper
