= Mambu =

Mambu may refer to:

- Mambu (company), a German fintech software company
- Helene Mambu (born 1948) Congolese public health expert, physician, pediatrician and United Nations diplomat
- Mambo (Vodou), a female high priest in the Vodou religion in Haiti

== See also ==
- Mambo (disambiguation)
