= Mbala Mbuta Biscotte =

Congolese footballer

Mbala Mbuta
Personal information
- Full name: Lakuya Mbala Mbuta Biscotte
- Date of birth: 7 April 1985 (age 41)
- Place of birth: Kinshasa, Zaire
- Height: 1.65 m (5 ft 5 in)
- Position: Striker

Team information
- Current team: SO Choletais
- Number: 8

Senior career*
Years	Team	Apps	(Gls)
2002	TP Mazembe	36	(16)
2003–2004	DC Motema Pembe	71	(45)
2004–2005	Hapoel Tel Aviv	14	(8)
2005–2006	Yverdon-Sport FC	33	(19)
2006–2007	Grasshopper Club Zürich	22	(8)
2007–2009	Yverdon-Sport FC	17	(8)
2008	→ Al-Ittihad (Jeddah) (loan)	18	(13)
2014 –	TP Mazembe		

International career
2002–2010	DR Congo	32	(3)
- * Club domestic league appearances and goals

Mbala Mbuta Biscotte (born 7 April 1985 in Kinshasa) is a Congolese footballer who last plays as striker for FC Locarno.

== Career ==
Mbala has previously played for Hapoel Tel Aviv F.C. and Grasshopper Club Zürich, he also played for the congolese club DC Motema Pembe, because of him they won the cup of Congo. And bolasie chose to play for them

== International career ==
Biscotte is a popular player on the DR Congo national football team. He appeared in the 2004 African Nations Cup where the Congo failed to advance to the second round. He has made regularly appearances for the national squad since late 2004. In 2004/2005 he helped the Congo qualify for the 2006 African Nations Cup. Biscotte played in every match in the 2006 African Nations Cup where the Congo made it to the quarter-finals.

Perhaps his most famous moment was against South Africa in 2004 for 2006 World Cup/African Nations Cup qualifying. In the 87th minute he made a mazy run around numerous defenders deep in South Africa's end that set up Kabamba Musasa for a tap in goal that gave the DR Congo a 1–0 victory. Because of that victory the fan named him Pied de Jesus (Jesus' foot) and also named him sauvons le Congo meaning Saves Congo due to the fact that his intervention revived DR Congo's qualification chances.

Biscotte also featured prominently in the BBC documentary Frontline Football, part one of which followed the Congolese national team as they prepared for the match against South Africa. The goal he set up for Kabamba Musasa features as a perfect climax to the documentary.

Following his retirement from professional football, Biscotte remained involved in the sport as a pundit and analyst. During the 2026 FIFA World Cup, he publicly analyzed the DR Congo national team's performance and expressed strong optimism regarding the Leopards' historic chances of qualifying for the knockout stage.

=== International goals ===
Scores and results list DR Congo's goal tally first.

No	Date	Venue	Opponent	Score	Result	Competition
1.	14 January 2004	Port Said Stadium, Port Said, Egypt	Egypt	2–2	2–2	Friendly
2.	20 June 2004	Stade des Martyrs, Kinshasa, DR Congo	Burkina Faso	2–1	3–2	2006 FIFA World Cup qualification
3.	16 August 2005	Stade Olympique Yves-du-Manoir, Paris, France	Guinea	1–0	3–1	Friendly

== Personal life ==
Biscotte's brother Glynn has represented DR Congo's Under 21s, and is currently playing in England for Brigg Town.

== See also ==
- List of people related to the Democratic Republic of the Congo
