= Herbert Dick =

Zimbabwean footballer (born 1979)

Personal information
- Date of birth: 2 September 1979 (age 47)
- Place of birth: Kadoma, Zimbabwe-Rhodesia
- Height: 1.80 m (5 ft 11 in)
- Position: Centre-back

Senior career*
Years	Team	Apps	(Gls)
2003–2005	Amazulu		
2006	Monomotapa United		
2006–2007	Legia Warsaw	11	(0)
2007	Dynamos F.C.		
2008	Highlanders F.C.		
2009–2010	Bantu Rovers		
2011–2012	Chicken Inn		
2013–2015	How Mine FC		

International career
- Zimbabwe
- * Club domestic league appearances and goals

Herbert Dick (born 2 September 1979) is a Zimbabwean former professional footballer who played as a centre-back.

Dick was a member of the Zimbabwe national team, and participated in the 2006 African Cup of Nations. In the 2006–07 season, he played for Polish club Legia Warsaw, and made his debut in the Ekstraklasa against Arka Gdynia on 8 September 2006.

== Honours ==
Amazulu

- Zimbabwe Premier Soccer League: 2003
