= Ibrahima Sory Souare =

Guinean footballer

Ibrahima Souaré
Personal information
- Full name: Ibrahima Sory Souaré
- Date of birth: July 14, 1982 (age 44)
- Place of birth: Conakry, Guinea
- Height: 1.80 m (5 ft 11 in)
- Position: Midfielder

Senior career*
| Years | Team | Apps | (Gls) |
| 1998 | Hirondellese Konakry | | |
| 1998–2001 | Rennes B | 8 | (1) |
| 2001–2003 | Changé | | |
| 2003–2004 | Beaucaire | | |
| 2004–2005 | Valence | 27 | (0) |
| 2005–2006 | Jura Sud | 13 | (1) |
| 2006–2008 | Martigues | 44 | (1) |
| 2008 | Apollon Kalamarias | 16 | (2) |
| 2009 | Kerkyra | 9 | (1) |

International career^{‡}
| 2006– | Guinea | 6 | (0) |
- * Club domestic league appearances and goals as of 17 July 2009 ‡ National team caps and goals as of March 9, 2009

Ibrahima Sory Souaré (born 14 July 1982 in Conakry) is a Guinean football midfielder who, as of 2009, plays for Greece side Kerkyra.

He was a member of the Guinea squad for the 2006 African Nations Cup where the team were eliminated in the quarter-finals.
