= Naji Shushan =

Libyan footballer (born 1981)

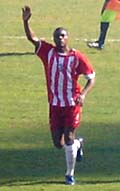

Personal information
- Full name: Naji Said Al Shushan
- Date of birth: January 14, 1981 (age 45)
- Place of birth: Tripoli, Libya
- Height: 1.82 m (6 ft 0 in)
- Position: Defender

Team information
- Current team: Alahly
- Number: 5

Senior career*
Years	Team	Apps	(Gls)
2003–04	Al-Olympic	?	(?)
2004–2008	Tripoli	?	(?)
- Alahly

International career
	Libya	28	(0)
- * Club domestic league appearances and goals as of January 27, 2007

Naji Shushan (Arabic: ناجي الشوشان; born January 14, 1981) is a Libyan football defender currently playing for Alahly. He was a member of the Libya national football team.
