= Naby Diarso =

Guinean footballer

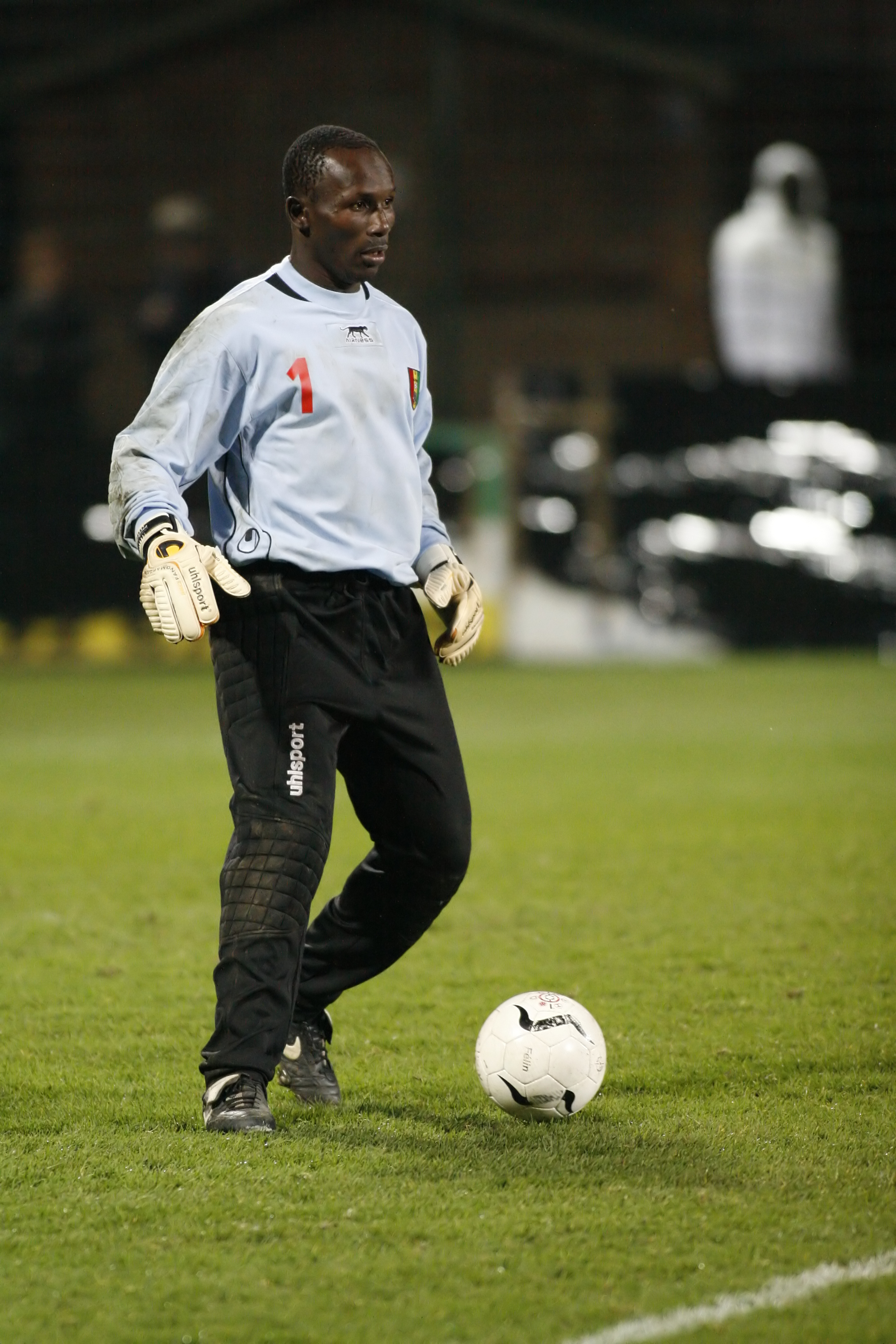

Personal information
- Date of birth: 1 January 1977 (age 49)
- Position: Goalkeeper

Senior career*
Years	Team	Apps	(Gls)
2005–2010	Satellite		

International career
2006–2007	Guinea	8	(0)
- * Club domestic league appearances and goals

Naby Diarso (born 1 January 1977 in Conakry) is a Guinean former footballer, who played with Satellite FC.

== International career ==
He represented Guinea at the 2006 Africa Cup of Nations and 2008 games.
