= Jean Marie Okwo Bele =

Congolese physician

Jean Marie Okwo-Bele is a Congolese physician, public health expert and former Director of the Department of Immunization, Vaccines and Biologicals of the World Health Organization (WHO) (2004–2017, Retired).

Okwo-Bele currently serves as Director on the Board of Trustees of the International Vaccine Institute (IVI) and is a member of the Leadership Coalition Group of the World Federation of Public Health Associations. In the recent years, he served on WHO emergency panels such as the WHO Review Committee on the Functioning of the International Health Regulations (2005) during the COVID-19 response and the WHO Emergency Committee on Ebola Virus Disease Outbreaks.

== Early life and education ==
Jean was born on 23 February 1957 in the small town of Beno, in Bagata Territory, Belgian Congo (now the Democratic Republic of the Congo.

Okwo-Bele grew up in Bandundu, a small town in Western DRC, where he received his high school education at the College Saint-Paul, a Catholic priesthood school. In 1981, he obtained his medical degree from the Kinshasa Campus of the University of Zaïre (now University of Kinshasa). He then trained as an epidemiologist at the Johns Hopkins School of Hygiene and Public Health (now the Johns Hopkins Bloomberg School of Public Health) and received his master's degree in Public Health in 1986.

== Career ==
Okwo-Bele joined the Ministry of Health in 1981 as surveillance officer for the World Health Organization-sponsored Monkeypox and Ebola surveillance project. He then moved on to support the roll out and integration of child survival programmes, immunization, diarrheal diseases, malaria, acute respiratory infections in the districts of Eastern DRC. In 1984, he was appointed National-level Manager of the DRC Immunization Programme, within the larger EPI-Combatting Child Communicable Diseases Division, where he was in charge of directing the roll out of immunization services in the districts, through training, supervision, setting up supply systems and monitoring programme expansion.

Okwo-Bele joined the World Health Organization Regional Office for Africa (WHO/AFRO) in 1989 as a medical officer, and epidemiologist. He went on to become Regional Adviser at WHO/AFRO, in charge of the Vaccine and Preventable Disease Unit, in 1993, launching the polio eradication initiative, facilitating the introduction of additional and new vaccines into national programmes and supporting improvements in routine programme implementation. He received the Rotary Paul Harris Fellow recognition for advancing polio eradication in Africa.

In 2002, Okwo-Bele left WHO to join another UN Agency, UNICEF, where he held the position of Chief of Global Immunization Activities, at the UNICEF Headquarters in New York City. He worked directly with the UNICEF Executive Director for the oversight of immunization activities in large countries of Africa and Southeast Asia that were lagging behind immunization and polio eradication programme targets. He also contributed to the design of the technical package of the Immunization Finance Facility for Immunization (IFFIm) that brought in substantive financial resources to the Gavi alliance. He held this position until he was called back to WHO in 2004 to serve as the Director of the Department of Immunization, Vaccines and Biologicals, at the WHO headquarters in Geneva, Switzerland. In this position, he has responsibility for strategic direction, coordination and management of the WHO normative and programmatic immunization activities, ranging from vaccine research, vaccine quality and safety to immunization policy and immunization services delivery.

Since he retired from the WHO in November 2017, Okwo-Bele provides consultancy and board advisory services on vaccine research and development, vaccine implementation and health emergencies.

== Bibliography ==
Peer-reviewed publications

- Cherian, Thomas; Okwo-Bele, Jean-Marie (1 May 2014). "The decade of vaccines global vaccine action plan: shaping immunization programmes in the current decade". Expert Review of Vaccines. 13 (5): 573–575. doi:10.1586/14760584.2014.897618. PMID 24678869. S2CID 36574955.
- Perry, Robert T.; Gacic-Dobo, Marta; Dabbagh, Alya; Mulders, Mick N.; Strebel, Peter M.; Okwo-Bele, Jean-Marie; Rota, Paul A.; Goodson, James L. (7 February 2014). "Global Control and Regional Elimination of Measles, 2000–2012". MMWR. Morbidity and Mortality Weekly Report. 63 (5): 103–107. PMC 4584639. PMID 24500289.
- Moorthy, Vs; Newman, Rd; Duclos, P; Okwo-Bele, Jm; Smith, Pg (April 2013). "Assessment of the RTS,S/AS01 malaria vaccine". The Lancet Infectious Diseases. 13 (4): 280–282. doi:10.1016/s1473-3099(13)70047-1. PMID 23454165.
- Kamara, L.; Lydon, P.; Bilous, J.; Vandelaer, J.; Eggers, R.; Gacic-Dobo, M.; Meaney, W.; Okwo-Bele, J.-M. (1 January 2013). "Global Immunization Vision and Strategy (GIVS): a mid-term analysis of progress in 50 countries". Health Policy and Planning. 28 (1): 11–19. doi:10.1093/heapol/czs020. PMID 22411879.
- Okwo-Bele, J. M. (1 March 2012). "Integrating Immunization With Other Health Interventions For Greater Impact: The Right Strategic Choice". Journal of Infectious Diseases. 205 (suppl 1): S4–S5. doi:10.1093/infdis/jir800. PMID 22315384.
- Okwo-Bele, Jean-Marie; Cherian, Thomas (December 2011). "The expanded programme on immunization: A lasting legacy of smallpox eradication". Vaccine. 29: D74–D79. doi:10.1016/j.vaccine.2012.01.080. PMID 22486980.
- Brown, David W; Burton, Anthony; Gacic-Dobo, Marta; Karimov, Rouslan I; Vandelaer, Jos; Okwo-Bele, Jean Marie (December 2011). "A mid-term assessment of progress towards the immunization coverage goal of the Global Immunization Vision and Strategy (GIVS)". BMC Public Health. 11 (1): 806. doi:10.1186/1471-2458-11-806. PMC 3210114. PMID 21999521.
- LaForce, F. Marc; Okwo-Bele, Jean-Marie (June 2011). "Eliminating Epidemic Group A Meningococcal Meningitis In Africa Through A New Vaccine". Health Affairs. 30 (6): 1049–1057. doi:10.1377/hlthaff.2011.0328. PMID 21653956.
- Duclos, Philippe; Okwo-Bele, Jean-Marie; Salisbury, David (February 2011). "Establishing global policy recommendations: the role of the Strategic Advisory Group of Experts on immunization". Expert Review of Vaccines. 10 (2): 163–173. doi:10.1586/erv.10.171. PMID 21332266. S2CID 46446841.
- Otten, Jr., Mac W.; Okwo‐Bele, Jean‐Marie; Kezaala, Robert; Biellik, Robin; Eggers, Rudi; Nshimirimana, Deogratias (15 May 2003). "Impact of Alternative Approaches to Accelerated Measles Control: Experience in the African Region, 1996–2002". The Journal of Infectious Diseases. 187 (s1): S36–S43. doi:10.1086/368272. PMID 12721884.
- Biellik, Robin; Madema, Simon; Taole, Anne; Kutsulukuta, Agnes; Allies, Ernestina; Eggers, Rudi; Ngcobo, Ntombenhle; Nxumalo, Mavis; Shearley, Adelaide; Mabuzane, Egleah; Kufa, Erica; Okwo-Bele, Jean-Marie (4 May 2002). "First 5 years of measles elimination in southern Africa: 1996–2000". The Lancet. 359 (9317): 1564–1568. doi:10.1016/S0140-6736(02)08517-3. PMID 12047966. S2CID 10560996.
- Lee, J W; Melgaard, B; Hull, H F; Barakamfitiye, D; Okwo-Bele, J M (January 1998). "Ethical dilemmas in polio eradication". American Journal of Public Health. 88 (1): 130–132. doi:10.2105/AJPH.88.1.130. PMC 1508400. PMID 9584020.
- Okwo-Bele, J.-M.; Lobanov, A.; Biellik, R. J.; Birmingham, M. E.; Pierre, L.; Tomori, O.; Barakamfitiye, D. (1 February 1997). "Overview of Poliomyelitis in the African Region and Current Regional Plan of Action". Journal of Infectious Diseases. 175 (Supplement 1): S10–S15. doi:10.1093/infdis/175.Supplement_1.S10. PMID 9203685.

== See also ==
- International Vaccine Institute
- World Federation of Public Health Association
- World Health Organization
- GAVI Alliance
- Helene Mambu
