= Charles Mhlauri =

Zimbabwean football manager

Personal information
- Date of birth: 19 June 1969 (age 57)
- Place of birth: Zimbabwe

Managerial career
- Years: Team
- 1992-1993: Zim Sun Rovers
- 1993: Phinda Mzala
- 1993-2001: AmaZulu
- 2003-2004: Caps United
- 2004-2007: Zimbabwe
Medal record
Men's football
Representing Zimbabwe (as manager)
COSAFA Cup
Winner	2005 Southern Africa

Charles Mhlauri (born 19 June 1969) is a Zimbabwean football manager who coached the Zimbabwe national team from 2004 to 2007. Coached professional in Zimbabwe including being the Men National Team Coach 2004–2007. He grew up playing for Zimbabwe Saints Juniors before playing for ZRP Mzilikazi, Dairibord FC, Zim Sun Rovers. He ventured into coaching after getting injured playing for Zim Sun Rovers in Victoria Falls. A Solusi University graduate worked for Standard Chartered bank and Commercial Bank of Zimbabwe before venturing into full time coaching. He was the founder owner and coach of AmaZulu FC. He is a holder of three championships medals. Leading AmaZulu into first division and twice winning championship with Caps United FC (2004 and 2005). Muhlauri holds various coaching qualifications including the DFB (Germany) A License obtained in Germany 2003. He graduated from Leipzig University with a Sports Science Diploma. Coached Caps United in Champions League. Appointed Zimbabwe National Team coach in 2004. In 2005 led Zimbabwe to win the coveted Cosafa Trophy in South Africa, beating Zambia 1–0 in the final. Led Zimbabwe National team to qualify for the 2006 Africa Cup of Nations finals in Egypt. The team was in the group of 'death' with Ghana, Nigeria, and Senegal. Zimbabwe beat Ghana and lost to Nigeria and Senegal. He was the youngest coach at the tournament. He now coaches for the Kimball Union Academy (KUA) Varsity Soccer team in New Hampshire USA.

== Honours ==
=== Manager ===
Zimbabwe

- COSAFA Cup: 2005
