= Cheikh N'Diaye =

Senegalese footballer (born 1985)

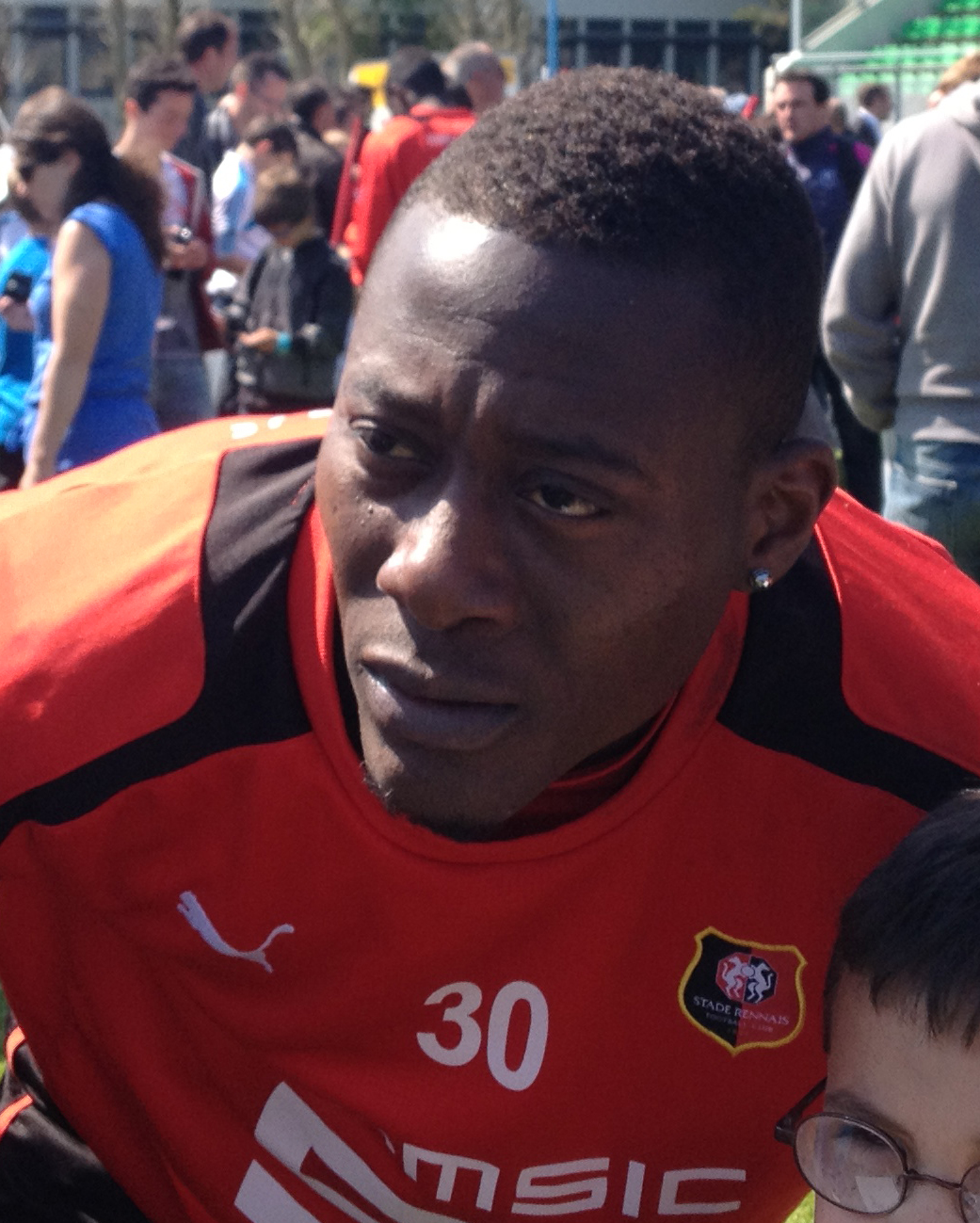
- N'Diaye with Rennes in May 2013

Personal information
- Full name: Cheikh Tidiane N'Diaye
- Date of birth: 15 February 1985 (age 41)
- Place of birth: Dakar, Senegal
- Height: 1.91 m (6 ft 3 in)
- Position: Goalkeeper

Team information
- Current team: Stade Briochin (GK coach)

Youth career
- 2004: Olympique Noisy-le-Sec

Senior career*
| Years | Team | Apps | (Gls) |
| 2005–2014 | Rennes | 3 | (0) |
| 2007–2008 | → Créteil (loan) | 20 | (0) |
| 2010–2014 | Rennes B | 10 | (0) |
| 2010–2011 | → Paris FC (loan) | 10 | (0) |
| 2015–2016 | Sedan | 16 | (0) |
| 2016–2024 | Stade Briochin | 107 | (0) |
| 2020–2024 | Stade Briochin B | 11 | (0) |

International career
| 2005–2014 | Senegal | 10 | (0) |

Managerial career
- 2020–: Stade Briochin (GK coach)
- * Club domestic league appearances and goals

Cheikh Tidiane N'Diaye (born 15 February 1985) is a Senegalese professional football coach and a former goalkeeper. He is the goalkeeping coach with French club Stade Briochin.

== Career ==
N'Diaye started his career with Olympique Noisy-le-Sec, a CFA2 (the fifth tier in the French football league system) club in the suburbs of Paris.

In 2005, he signed for Rennes. He has only made a single appearance for the Brittany club, in a Coupe de la Ligue tie with Montpellier.

After leaving Rennes in the summer of 2014, N'Diaye spent a year without a club before signing with Sedan in June 2015.

In June 2016, N'Diaye signed for fifth-tier side Stade Briochin.

He holds both Senegalese and French nationalities.
