= Meftah Ghazalla =

Libyan footballer (born 1977)

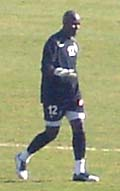

Personal information
- Full name: Meftah Saad Ghazalla
- Date of birth: October 3, 1977 (age 49)
- Place of birth: Tripoli, Libya
- Height: 1.79 m (5 ft 10 in)
- Position: Goalkeeper

Senior career*
Years	Team	Apps	(Gls)
2003–2004	Al-Madina		
2004–2014	Al-Ittihad		

International career
2003–2007	Libya	15	(0)
- * Club domestic league appearances and goals as of January 27, 2007

Meftah Ghazalla (Arabic: مفتاح غزالة; born October 3, 1977) is a Libyan retired professional football goalkeeper. He currently plays for Al-Ittihad, and is a member of the Libya national football team.
