= Mahmoud Maklouf =

Libyan footballer (born 1975)

Mahmoud Makhlof
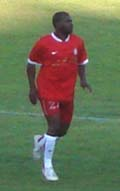

Personal information
- Full name: Mahmoud Makhlof
- Date of birth: April 17, 1975 (age 51)
- Place of birth: Tripoli, Libya
- Height: 1.66 m (5 ft 5 in)
- Position: Defender

Senior career*
Years	Team	Apps	(Gls)
1999–2001	Al Mahla		
2001–2008	Al-Ittihad		

International career
1998–2006	Libya	29	(0)
- * Club domestic league appearances and goals

Mahmoud Makhlof (Arabic: محمود مخلوف; born April 17, 1975) is a Libyan former professional football who played as a defender. He was a member of the Libya national football team.

== Career statistics ==
=== International ===
Appearances and goals by national team and year
National team	Year	Apps	Goals
Libya	1998	1	0
Libya	1999	3	0
Libya	2000	4	0
Libya	2001	4	0
Libya	2002	3	0
Libya	2003	1	0
Libya	2004	5	0
Libya	2005	5	0
Libya	2006	3	0
Total		29	0
