= Mlungisi Mdluli =

South African soccer player

Personal information
- Full name: Mlungisi Peace Mdluli
- Date of birth: 9 March 1980 (age 46)
- Place of birth: Soweto, South Africa
- Height: 1.65 m (5 ft 5 in)
- Position: Midfielder

Senior career*
Years	Team	Apps	(Gls)
2000–2002	Maritzburg City		
2002–2007	Golden Arrows	86	(7)
2007–2010	Orlando Pirates	42	(0)
Total		128+	(7+)

International career
2006	South Africa	2	(0)
- * Club domestic league appearances and goals

Mlungisi "Pro" Mdluli, previously Mlungisi Gumbi, (born 9 March 1980) is a South African former professional soccer player who played as a midfielder. He played for Maritzburg City, Golden Arrows and Orlando Pirates in the Premier Soccer League and won two caps for South Africa, including one at the 2006 African Cup of Nations.
