= Tshamalenga Kabundi =

Democratic Republic of the Congo footballer

Personal information
- Full name: Félicien Tshamalenga Kabundi
- Date of birth: May 15, 1980 (age 46)
- Place of birth: DR Congo
- Height: 1.82 m (6 ft 0 in)
- Position: Defender

Team information
- Current team: TP Mazembe

Youth career
- 2001–2004: FC Saint Eloi Lupopo

Senior career*
Years	Team	Apps	(Gls)
2005	FC Saint Eloi Lupopo	19	(0)
2006–	TP Mazembe	128	(3)
2008	→ FC Saint Eloi Lupopo (loan)	12	(0)

International career
2006	Congo DR	8	(0)
- * Club domestic league appearances and goals

Félicien Tshamalenga Kabundi (born 15 May 1980) is a football defender from Congo DR. He currently plays for TP Mazembe in DR Congo.
