= Eugène Diomi Ndongala Nzomambu =

Congolese politician

Eugène Diomi Ndongala Nzomambu (born 1962) is a politician from the Democratic Republic of the Congo. He was parliamentary and vice-minister of Economy and Finances in the government of president Mobutu Sésé Seko.

On the evening of 10 December 1997, a dozen members of President Laurent-Désiré Kabila's military police came to Eugène Diomi Ndongala's house. They raped his two sisters, Arlette Fula, aged 22, and Charlotte Ndongi, aged 21 and also searched and looted the house. The soldiers then arrested Ndongala on his return home. They did not have a warrant. He was taken to a private residence and later transferred to Loano military barracks in Kinshasa. From there, he was taken to Kokolo military barracks. On 2 January 1998, he was taken to a farm at Mikonga, on the outskirts of Kinshasa and returned to Kokolo barracks the following day. During his detention, he had reportedly been severely beaten. His state of health deteriorated when he suffered from acute appendicitis. On 8 January 1998, after public pressure on the authorities, he was transferred to a hospital and underwent surgery. He was released on 24 January 1998.

Ndongala is now the president of the Front pour la survie de la démocratie au Congo (Front for the Survival of Democracy in Congo).
