= Gift Muzadzi =

Zimbabwean footballer (born 1974)

Personal information
- Date of birth: 2 October 1974 (age 52)
- Place of birth: Salisbury, Rhodesia
- Height: 1.81 m (5 ft 11 in)
- Position: Goalkeeper

Senior career*
Years	Team	Apps	(Gls)
1992–1994	Darryn Textiles FC	67	(0)
1994–1995	Radomiak Radom		
1995–1996	Lech Poznań	20	(0)
1997–1999	Dynamos FC		
1999–2000	Zimbabwe Saints	20	(0)
2000–2002	Dynamos FC		
2002–2004	Hellenic FC		
2004	MTL Wanderers		
2004–2005	Sporting Lions		
2005–2006	Chitungwiza United		
2006–2007	Fidentia Rangers		
2008	Gunners		

International career
1997–2006	Zimbabwe		
- * Club domestic league appearances and goals

Gift Muzadzi (born 2 October 1974) is a Zimbabwean former professional footballer who played as a goalkeeper.

On 13 April 2016, Dynamos F.C. sacked Muzadzi from the position of goalkeeping coach.
