= Daniel Tshabalala =

South African soccer player

Personal information
- Full name: Daniel Tshabalala
- Date of birth: 6 October 1977 (age 49)
- Place of birth: Sebokeng, Gauteng, South Africa
- Height: 1.69 m (5 ft 7 in)
- Position: Full back

Senior career*
Years	Team	Apps	(Gls)
2001–2003	Silver Stars	57	(7)
2003–2006	Orlando Pirates	33	(1)
2006–2007	FC AK	5	(0)
2007–2010	Platinum Stars	39	(0)
Total		134	(8)

International career
2006	South Africa	3	(0)
- * Club domestic league appearances and goals

Daniel "Sailor" Tshabalala (born 6 October 1977 in Sebokeng, Gauteng) is a retired South African football defender.

Tshabalala played for Platinum Stars, FC AK and Orlando Pirates. He made four appearances for the South African squad and was part of the 2006 African Nations Cup squad.
