= Francis Chansa =

Congolese football goalkeeper

Personal information
- Full name: Francis Chansa
- Date of birth: September 10, 1974 (age 52)
- Place of birth: Lubumbashi, Zaire
- Height: 1.73 m (5 ft 8 in)
- Position: Goalkeeper

Team information
- Current team: Maritzburg United
- Number: 33

Senior career*
Years	Team	Apps	(Gls)
1997–1998	Durban Bush Bucks	?	(?)
1998–1999	Durban United	28	(?)
1999–2000	Royal Tigers	?	(?)
2000–2004	Golden Arrows	?	(?)
2004–2008	Orlando Pirates	71	(0)
2008–2009	Engen Santos	22	(0)
2009–2010	Bidvest Wits	8	(0)
2010–2011	Mpumalanga Black Aces	12	(0)
2011–2012	Maritzburg United	5	(0)

International career
- DR Congo
- * Club domestic league appearances and goals

Francis Chansa (born September 10, 1974 in Lubumbashi) is a Congolese football goalkeeper who last played for Maritzburg United in South Africa. He also holds South African citizenship.

He was a member of the Congolese 2006 African Nations Cup team, who progressed to the quarter-finals, where they were eliminated by Egypt, who eventually won the tournament.

Chansa is known for his acrobatic saves.

Chansa was the shot-stopper coach in Vera Pauw's technical team, which assisted Banyana Banyana in qualifying for the Africa Cup of Nations and the Olympic Games.

== See also ==
- List of people related to the Democratic Republic of the Congo
