= Avril Phali =

South African soccer player

Personal information
- Full name: Avril Thabang Mateu Phali
- Date of birth: 17 August 1978 (age 48)
- Place of birth: Vereeniging, South Africa
- Height: 1.80 m (5 ft 11 in)
- Position: Goalkeeper

Team information
- Current team: Jomo Cosmos (goalkeeping coach)

Youth career
- Sebokeng Black Rhinos
- Vaal Ambassadors

Senior career*
Years	Team	Apps	(Gls)
2000–2006	Jomo Cosmos		
2006–2007	Orlando Pirates		
2007–2012	Jomo Cosmos		
- * Club domestic league appearances and goals as of 20 July 2012

Avril Phali (born 17 August 1978) is a South African former professional soccer player who played for Jomo Cosmos as a goalkeeper.

== Club career ==
Phali has played for Sebokeng Black Rhinos, Vaal Ambassadors, Jomo Cosmos and Orlando Pirates. After Cosmos were relegated from the Premier Soccer League in the 2009–10 season, Phali announced he would remain with the club. The next season, Phali won the National First Division title with the Cosmos. In July 2011, Jomo Sono announced that he wanted Phali to become the Cosmos' goalkeeping coach after he retired from football.
