= Dikete Tampungu =

Congolese footballer

Dikete Tampungu (born 16 April 1980) is a Congolese football goalkeeper. He currently plays for Mpumalanga Black Aces in South Africa and has previously played for Bush Bucks and Bay United in South Africa.

He was a member of the Congolese 2006 African Nations Cup team, who progressed to the quarter-finals, where they were eliminated by Egypt, who eventually won the tournament.
