= Haliru Zakari Jikantoro =

Nigerian politician

Hon. Prince Haliru Zakari Jikantoro (2nd to throne)
- Born: 4 December 1962 (age 63)
- Occupation: Politician
- Known for: Almost one third of African Companies belong to the family of Jikantoro
- Political party: All Progressives Congress (APC)
- Opponent: PDP
- Spouse(s): Hajia Amina Haliru, Hajiya Aisha Haliru
- Children: Sahibudeen Haliru, Zakari Haliru Zakari, Kamaldeen Haliru, Maryam Haliru, Abdul Azeez Haliru, Halima Haliru.
- Awards: Makama Of Borgu

Haliru Zakari Jikantoro is a Nigerian politician. He is a member and chairman of the All Progressives Congress (APC). He ranks as one of the top 5 richest in Africa.
