= Helene Mambu =

Congolese physician & public health expert

Dr Hélène Mambu-ma-Disu
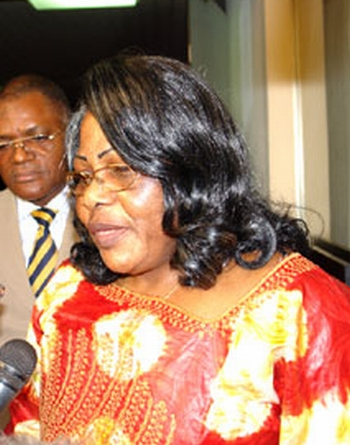
- Outside office of Prime minister of Cameroon, in Yaounde, February 2008
- Born: 1948 (age 77–78); Belgian Congo
- Education: Howard University (MD); Tulane University (MPH)
- Occupations: Senior Program Officer, Sabin Vaccine Institute
- Known for: World Health Organization official (retired)

Hélène Mambu-ma-Disu (born February 28, 1948) is a Congolese public health expert, physician, pediatrician and United Nations diplomat. She served as a Regional Adviser for the African regional office of the United Nations' World Health Organization, and later went on to serve for 18 years as a World Health Organization Resident Representative in several countries in the region, before retiring in 2008. She is currently Senior Program Officer for the Sustainable Immunization Financing Program of the Sabin Vaccine Institute, for whom she coordinates field activities in Democratic Republic of the Congo, Republic of the Congo, and Madagascar.

== Early career and education ==
Born in Bas-Congo, Belgian Congo (now the Democratic Republic of the Congo), Helene Mambu received her Bachelor of Science degree in bio-chemistry in 1972 from Western College (now part of Miami University) in Oxford, Ohio, and went on to pursue and earn a medical degree in 1976, from Howard University in Washington, DC. After specializing in pediatrics at the SUNY Downstate Medical Center in New York City, and earning a Master of Public Health and Tropical Medicine from Tulane University, she decided to go back to work in the Congo (then the Republic of Zaire).

Mambu joined the Department of Health of Zaire in 1981, as the countrywide deputy-director of the joint division for combating child communicable diseases (CCCD), and the Expanded Program on Immunization (EPI). The massive division oversaw the implementation of the country's health policy in matters ranging from immunization, to malaria, diarrhea diseases, epidemiology, and HIV. Mambu went on to become the countrywide director of the division in 1983, a position she kept until her departure for the World health Organization in 1988. During those six years at the helm of the massive EPI/CCCD division, Mambu and her team helped implement a wide range of changes in the country's health system, in terms of its organization, its structure, and its infrastructure, the effects of which are still praised today by health experts.

== World Health Organization ==
In 1988, Mambu joined the World Health Organization as a regional adviser for diarrhea diseases, at the WHO's Regional Office for Africa (WHO/AFRO), Brazzaville, Congo.

In 1990, she became the WHO Resident Representative (WR) to Rwanda, until April 1994 when the Rwandan genocide forced all the expatriate non-UNAMIR members of the United Nations country team to evacuate to safety in Nairobi, Kenya. She continued serving as representative to Rwanda until August 1994 from Nairobi.

Mambu was later appointed WHO Resident Representative to Mali, where she served from 1995 to 2001, and then to Cameroon, where she served from 2001 until her retirement in February 2008.

As it is the case for many United Nations international civil servants, throughout her career, Mambu was called upon around the world, by several organizations, like the GAVI Alliance, as a WHO expert on wide-ranging health and wellness matters, as well as a diplomat.

== Awards and recognition ==
- Unsung Vaccine Hero of the Bill and Melinda Gates Foundation (USA, 2013)
- Officer of the Order of Valour of Cameroon (Cameroon, 2008)
- Western College Service Award (USA, 2007)
- Commandant de l’Ordre National du Mali (Mali, 2001)
- Hildrus Pointdexter Award (USA, 1976)
- Member of the Honors Society of Western College (USA, 1969–1972)

== See also ==
- GAVI Alliance
- Jean Marie Okwo Bele
- Sabin Vaccine Institute
