= Félix Mwamba Musasa =

Congolese footballer

Félix Mwamba Musasa (born November 25, 1976, in Lubumbashi) is a Congolese football player who played for, and captained, the Mpumalanga Black Aces in South African Premier Soccer League. He is the brother of Kabamba Musasa.

== Career ==
He previously played for Orlando Pirates, TP Mazembe and Roan United (Zambia).

Musasa missed a large part of the Black Aces' first season back in the Premier Soccer League after serving an eight-game suspension on charges of misconduct relating to unsportsmanlike behavior and assault, following a challenge which broke the leg of opponent Oupa Ngulube during the promotion playoff match against Carara Kicks on May 24, 2009, he was given a red card.

He is known for wearing white gloves during games.

== International career ==
Musasa was part of the Congolese 2004 African Nations Cup team. They finished bottom of their group in the first round of competition, failing to secure qualification for the quarterfinals.
