= Haliru Alidu =

Togolese football midfielder

Personal information
- Full name: Haliru Alidu
- Date of birth: February 24, 1984 (age 42)
- Place of birth: Togo
- Position: Midfielder

Team information
- Current team: AS Douanes

Senior career*
| Years | Team | Apps | (Gls) |
| 2005– | AS Douanes | | |

International career^{‡}
| 2006 | Togo | 0 | (0) |
- * Club domestic league appearances and goals as of 10 March 2009 ‡ National team caps and goals as of 10 March 2009

Haliru Alidu (born 24 February 1984) is a Togolese football midfielder. He currently plays for AS Douanes.

Alidu represented the Togo national football team in Egypt 2006 Africa Cup of Nations.
