= Nono Lubanzadio =

Congolese footballer

Lubanzadio
Personal information
- Full name: Mayasisilua Nono Lubanzadio
- Date of birth: 27 January 1984 (age 42)
- Place of birth: Kinshasa, Zaire
- Position: Defender

Team information
- Current team: Black Leopards
- Number: 8

Senior career*
Years	Team	Apps	(Gls)
2005	SC Cilu Lukala		(34)
2006	TP Mazembe		
2006	SC Cilu Lukala	25	(2)
2006–2008	Black Leopards		

International career
2005–2006	DR Congo	8	(0)
- * Club domestic league appearances and goals

Mayasisilwa "Nono" Lubanzadio (born 27 January 1984) is a retired Congolese football defender.

== Career ==
Lubanzadio played club football for TP Mazembe in Democratic Republic of the Congo, and for Black Leopards F.C. in South Africa's Premier Soccer League.

He was a member of the Congolese 2006 African Nations Cup team, who progressed to the quarter finals, where they were eliminated by Egypt, who eventually won the tournament.
