= Karim Saidi =

Tunisian footballer

Karim Saïdi
Personal information
- Full name: Karim Ben Ahmed Saïdi; Arabic: كريم سعيدي
- Date of birth: 24 March 1983 (age 43)
- Place of birth: Tunis, Tunisia
- Height: 1.86 m (6 ft 1 in)
- Position: Centre back

Youth career
- 1994–2002: Club Africain

Senior career*
Years	Team	Apps	(Gls)
2001–2004	Club Africain	?	(?)
2004–2008	Feyenoord	46	(1)
2006	→ Lecce (loan)	9	(0)
2008	→ Sivasspor (loan)	13	(0)
2008–2009	Club Africain	5	(0)
2009–2011	Tours	48	(2)
2011–2014	Lierse	63	(2)

International career
2003–2013	Tunisia	18	(1)
Medal record
Men's football
Representing Tunisia
Africa Cup of Nations
Winner	2004 Tunisia
- * Club domestic league appearances and goals as of 23 January 2014

Karim Saïdi (Arabic: كريم سعيدي; born 24 March 1983) is a Tunisian former footballer who last played for Belgian club Lierse SK. He now runs a coffee shop in Tunisia. He was part of the squad that won the 2004 African Cup of Nations.

== Club career ==
=== Club Africain ===
When Karim was 10 years old he joined Club Africain, one of the major clubs in Tunisia. He made his debut in the Tunisian national team against Morocco in 2003.

=== Feyenoord ===
In 2004 the right-footed defender moved to Feyenoord Rotterdam after advice from his friend Hatem Trabelsi and signed a contract till 2008. During his first season he was the first choice in Feyenoord's central defense, as a result of which he played 30 matches in the Dutch Eredivisie.

=== Lecce ===
As of 2005/06, Saïdi lost his spot in the starting eleven. Determined to play as a regular in order to increase his chances to be in the Tunisian squad during the FIFA World Cup 2006, he moved on loan to US Lecce of Italian Serie A on 31 January 2006. He made 9 appearances with Lecce and gained a place in the Tunisian squad for the FIFA World Cup 2006.

=== Feyenoord return and Sivasspor ===
Following the World Cup, Karim returned to Feyenoord for the 2006/2007 season. He remained at the club until January 2008, when he moved on loan to Sivasspor in January 2008. Karim made a good impression in the Turkish first division helping the club secure an impressive fourth place allowing it to participate in its first ever European cup.

=== Return to Club Africain ===
On 9 October 2008 he signed a four-year contract with his former club Club Africain.

=== Tour FC ===
Failing to reassert himself in his childhood club, he signed a two-year deal with Tours FC in June 2009.

=== Lierse SK ===
On 9 July 2011 Saidi signed a two-year contract with Belgian Pro League outfit Lierse SK.

In January 2015, Saidi went on trial with Kazakhstan Premier League side FC Irtysh Pavlodar, but did not earn a contract.

== Honours ==
Tunisia

- Africa Cup of Nations: 2004
