= Sékouba Camara (footballer, born 1983) =

Guinean football defender

Personal information
- Full name: Sékouba Camara
- Date of birth: August 10, 1983 (age 43)
- Place of birth: Guinea
- Position: Midfielder

Senior career*
Years	Team	Apps	(Gls)
2004–2014	Kaloum Star		

International career
2005–2006	Guinea	3	(0)
- * Club domestic league appearances and goals

Sékouba Camara (born 10 August 1983) is a Guinean former professional footballer who played as a midfielder. He made three appearances for the Guinea national team from 2005 to 2006.

== International career ==
Camara was a member of the Guinea squad for the 2006 African Nations Cup where the team were eliminated in the quarter-finals.
