= Amir Haj Massaoud =

Tunisian footballer

Personal information
- Full name: Amir Haj Massaoud
- Date of birth: 8 February 1981 (age 45)
- Place of birth: Sfax, Tunisia
- Height: 1.79 m (5 ft 10 1/2 in)
- Position: Right-back

Team information
- Current team: Club Africain

Senior career*
Years	Team	Apps	(Gls)
2003–2010	Sfaxien	200	(7)
2010–2011	Stade Tunisien	12	(2)
2011–2012	Club Africain		
2012–2014	Zarzis		

International career^{‡}
2005–2007	Tunisia	5	(0)
- * Club domestic league appearances and goals as of 9 March 2008 ‡ National team caps and goals as of 23 June 2006

Amir Haj Massaoud (Arabic:أمير الحاج مسعود) (born 8 February 1981) is a former Tunisian footballer.

He was part of the Tunisian 2004 Olympic football team, who exited in the first round, finishing third in group C, behind group and gold medal winners Argentina and runners-up Australia. He was also selected for the 2005 FIFA Confederations Cup, but did not appear in any matches.

Messaoud suffered a double-fracture of his leg from a reckless tackle during a Tunisian Ligue Professionnelle 1 match in December 2007.
