= Belmond Nsumbu Dituabanza =

Congolese footballer

Personal information
- Full name: Belmond Nsumbu Dituabanza
- Date of birth: 31 January 1982 (age 44)
- Place of birth: Kinshasa, Zaïre
- Position: Defender

Senior career*
Years	Team	Apps	(Gls)
–2001	SC Cilu		
2002–2003	AS Vita Club		
2004	FC Saint-Éloi Lupopo		
2005–2007	AS Vita Club		
2008–2009	FC Saint-Éloi Lupopo		
2009–2017	FC Sturm Hauzenberg		

International career
2004–2007	DR Congo	19	(0)
- * Club domestic league appearances and goals

Belmond Nsumbu Dituabanza (born 31 January 1982) is a retired Congolese football defender.

He was a member of the Congolese 2006 African Nations Cup team, who progressed to the quarter-finals, where they were eliminated by Egypt, who eventually won the tournament.
