= Hamdi Kasraoui =

Tunisian footballer and coach

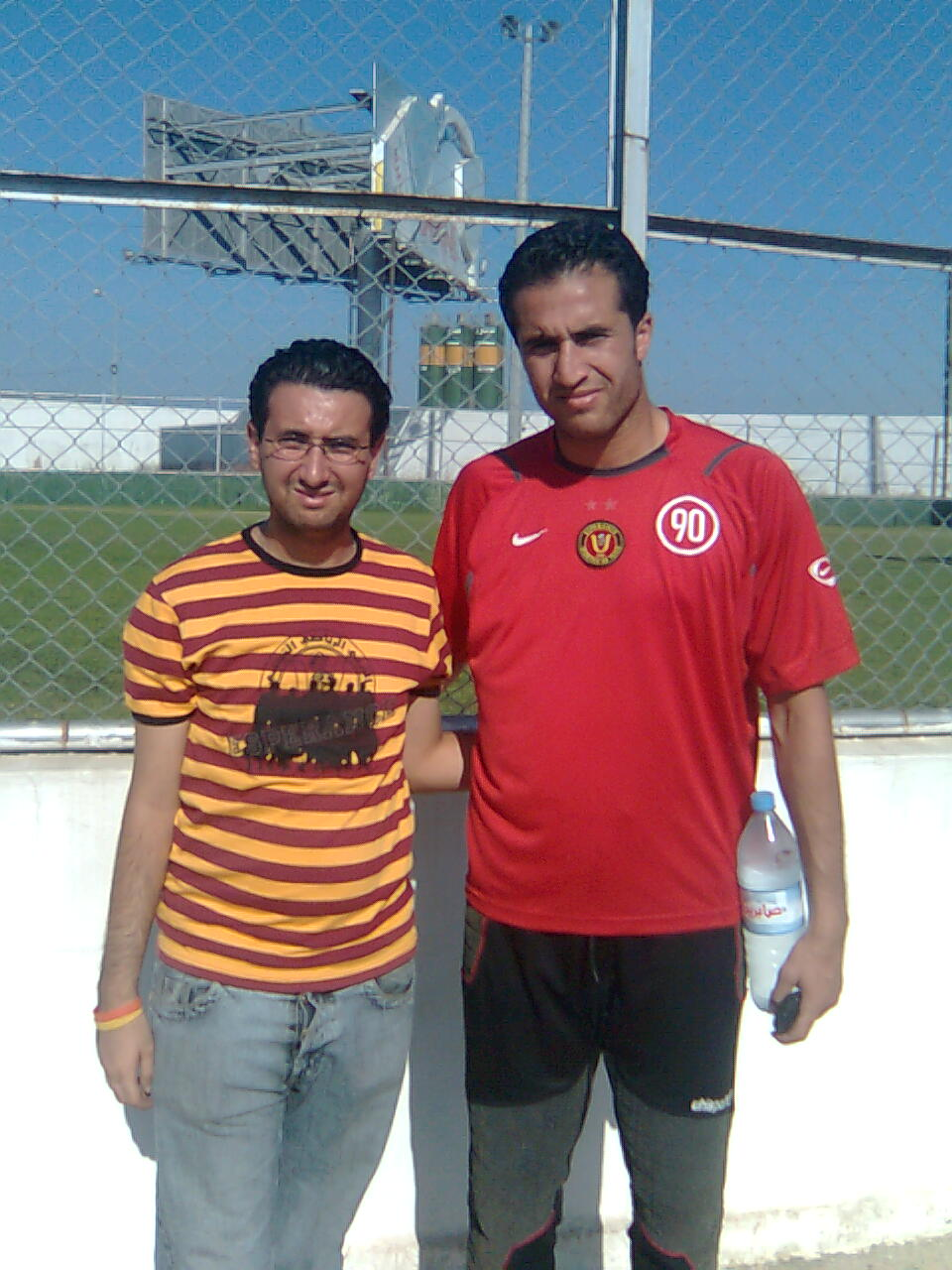

Personal information
- Full name: Hamdi Kasraoui
- Date of birth: 18 January 1983 (age 43)
- Place of birth: Sousse, Tunisia
- Height: 1.92 m (6 ft 4 in)
- Position: Goalkeeper

Senior career*
Years	Team	Apps	(Gls)
2002–2009	Espérance de Tunis	135	(1)
2009–2013	RC Lens	42	(0)
2013	Club Sfaxien	8	(0)
2014–2015	Stade Tunisien	18	(0)
2015–2018	Club Bizertin	46	(0)
Total		249	(1)

International career
2005–2012	Tunisia	38	(0)

Managerial career
- 2018–2019: Tunisia (goalkeeping coach)
- 2021–2023: Espérance de Tunis (goalkeeping coach)
- * Club domestic league appearances and goals

Hamdi Kasraoui (Arabic: حمدي القصراوي, born 18 January 1983) is a Tunisian former professional footballer who played as a goalkeeper.

== Club career ==
Kasraoui played for Espérance Sportive de Tunis until 25 May 2009, when he signed with French club RC Lens, which had just secured promotion to Ligue 1. He spent the 2009-10 season as the club's second-choice goalkeeper behind Vedran Runje, making his Ligue 1 debut on 17 April 2010 in a goalless draw at OGC Nice after Runje was injured. Following his debut, Kasraoui appeared in all five of the club's remaining league matches that season.

He returned to Tunisia in December 2012 and announced his departure to his teammates with an emotional message in the locker room. His transfer to Club SS Sfaxien was formalized by the Tunisian club on 20 December for a six-month contract and he won the Tunisian championship for the fourth time in his career.

He also signed a contract with Stade Tunisien in 2014 before joining Club Bizertin in 2015, where he remained for three years before retiring in 2018.

== International career ==
Kasraoui earned 16 caps for the Tunisian national team and participated in the 2005 FIFA Confederations Cup hosted by Germany and the 2006 African Cup of Nations in Egypt. He served as the second-choice goalkeeper at both the club and international levels and was called up to the 2006 World Cup as a reserve for Ali Boumnijel. After Boumnijel's retirement from international football, Kasraoui became Tunisia's first choice goalkeeper for the 2008 African Cup of Nations, though he was not as successful as his predecessor.

He retired from international football in 2012.

== Coaching career ==
He began his managerial career on 4 August 2018 when he was appointed as a goalkeeping coach of the Tunisia national team under head coach Faouzi Benzarti. On 2 August 2021, he was appointed as the goalkeeping coach of Espérance de Tunis.
