= Anis Ayari =

Tunisian footballer

Personal information
- Full name: Anis Ayari
- Date of birth: February 16, 1982 (age 44)
- Place of birth: Ezzahra, Tunisia
- Height: 1.79 m (5 ft 10 1/2 in)
- Position: Defender

Senior career*
Years	Team	Apps	(Gls)
2001–2004	Stade Tunisien		
2004–2006	Samsunspor	42	(0)
2006–2007	Lorient	2	(0)

International career^{‡}
2002–2006	Tunisia	26	(1)
Medal record
Men's football
Representing Tunisia
Africa Cup of Nations
Winner	2004 Tunisia
- * Club domestic league appearances and goals as of September 15, 2008 ‡ National team caps and goals as of 17 November 2009

Anis Ayari (Arabic: أَنِيس الْعَيَّارِيّ; born February 16, 1982) is a Tunisian former footballer. He last played for Étoile du Sahel.

== Club career ==
Ayari debuted as a player with Stade Tunisien in March 2002, playing both defence and midfield. Ayari moved from Stade Tunisien in 2004 to Turkish club Samsunspor. He joined French first division side Lorient at the start of 2006-07 but his contract was cancelled in April 2007 by mutual consent. Later that same season he signed for Étoile du Sahel.

== International career ==
He was a member of the Tunisian 2004 Olympic football team, who exited in the first round, finishing third in group C, behind group and gold medal winners Argentina and runners-up Australia. He was part of the squad that won the 2004 African Cup of Nations.

== Honours ==
Tunisia

- Africa Cup of Nations: 2004
