= Haykel Guemamdia =

Tunisian footballer

Personal information
- Full name: Haykel Guemamdia
- Date of birth: 22 December 1981 (age 44)
- Place of birth: Gafsa, Tunisia
- Height: 1.77 m (5 ft 9 1/2 in)
- Position: Forward

Youth career
- EGS Gafsa

Senior career*
Years	Team	Apps	(Gls)
2000–2005	Sfaxien	56	(23)
2005–2007	Strasbourg	13	(0)
2006–2007	→ Al-Ahli Jeddah (loan)	15	(8)
2008	Ceahlăul Piatra Neamţ	7	(3)
2008–2012	Sfaxien	38	(11)
2010–2011	→ Al-Ahly Benghazi (loan)	15	(1)
Total		129	(46)

International career^{‡}
2005–2008	Tunisia	14	(6)
- * Club domestic league appearances and goals as of 18:16, 23 June 2014 (UTC) ‡ National team caps and goals as of 23 June 2006

Haykel Guemamdia (Arabic: هيكل قمامدية; born 22 December 1981) is a Tunisian retired footballer who played as a forward.

Guemamdia had a spell with RC Strasbourg in France's Ligue 1. (Note: Haykel Guemamdia – French league stats at LFP – also available in French (archived))

Guemamdia was a member of the Tunisia squad for the 2006 FIFA World Cup, having been called up as a late replacement for the injured Mehdi Meriah. As of 19 June 2006, Guemamdia had played in 14 caps and scored 5 goals for his country, his first appearance coming against Malawi on 26 March 2005.

== International career ==
=== International goals ===
Scores and results list Tunisia's goal tally first.

No.	Date	Venue	Opponent	Score	Result	Competition
1.	26 March 2005	Stade 7 November, Tunis, Tunisia	Malawi	1–0	7–0	2006 FIFA World Cup qualification
2.	15 June 2005	RheinEnergieStadion, Cologne, Germany	Argentina	1–2	1–2	2005 FIFA Confederations Cup
3.	17 August 2005	Stade 7 November, Tunis, Tunisia	Kenya	1–0	1–0	2006 FIFA World Cup qualification
4.	3 September 2005	Moi International Sports Centre, Nairobi, Kenya	Kenya	1–0	2–0	2006 FIFA World Cup qualification
5.	16 November 2005	Osman Ahmed Osman Stadium, Cairo, Egypt	Egypt	1–1	2–1	Friendly
6.	16 November 2005	Osman Ahmed Osman Stadium, Cairo, Egypt	Egypt	2–1	2–1	Friendly

== Honours ==
=== Club ===
Sfaxien

- Tunisian League: 2004–05
- Tunisian President Cup: 2003–04, 2008–09

Al-Ahli Jeddah

- Crown Prince Cup: 2006–07
