= Khaled Fadhel =

Tunisian football player and goalkeeper

Personal information
- Date of birth: September 29, 1976 (age 50)
- Place of birth: Tunis, Tunisia
- Height: 1.82 m (6 ft 0 in)
- Position: Goalkeeper

Senior career*
Years	Team	Apps	(Gls)
1996–2001	Club Africain		
2001–2004	CS Sfaxien		
2004–2005	Diyarbakırspor	26	(0)
2005–2007	Kayseri Erciyesspor	45	(0)
2007–2008	US Monastir		

International career
2003–2005	Tunisia	8	(0)
Medal record
Men's football
Representing Tunisia
Africa Cup of Nations
Winner	2004 Tunisia
- * Club domestic league appearances and goals

Khaled Fadhel (born September 29, 1976 in Tunis) is a Tunisian football former player and goalkeeper. He played for Kayseri Erciyesspor in Turkey.

Fadhel was a member of the Tunisian 2004 Olympic football squad, which exited in the first round. The team finished third in group C, behind group and gold medal winners Argentina and runners-up Australia. He was part of the squad that won the 2004 African Cup of Nations.

Fadhel transferred from Diyarbakırspor in 2006.

== Honours ==
Tunisia

- Africa Cup of Nations: 2004
