= Kabamba Musasa =

Congolese footballer (born 1982)

Musasa Kabamba
Personal information
- Date of birth: 31 May 1982 (age 44)
- Place of birth: Kinshasa, Zaire
- Height: 1.78 m (5 ft 10 in)
- Position: Forward

Senior career*
Years	Team	Apps	(Gls)
1998–1999	Vatican Kinshasa	39	(19)
2000	JAC Trésor Kinshasa	22	(8)
2001	AS Paulino Kinshasa	33	(9)
2002	Saint-Éloi Lupopo	28	(8)
2002–2005	Kaizer Chiefs	47	(13)
2004–2005	Istanbulspor	28	(6)
2005–2007	Maritzburg United	26	(5)
2007–2008	Mpumalanga Black Aces	19	(5)
2008–2009	Maccabi Herzliya		
2010	Primeiro de Agosto		
2012	Saint-Éloi Lupopo		
2013	Primeiro de Agosto	2	(2)
2013	Porcelana F.C.	6	(0)

International career
2003–2006	DR Congo	17	(3)
- * Club domestic league appearances and goals

Musasa Tshatsho Kabamba (born 31 May 1982) is a Congolese former professional footballer who played as a forward. He scored three goals in 17 appearances for the DR Congo national team. He is the brother of Felix Mwamba Musasa.

== Club career ==
Musasa played for Saint-Éloi Lupopo, Kaizer Chiefs, Istanbulspor, Maritzburg United, Mpumalanga Black Aces, Maccabi Herzliya, and Primeiro de Agosto.

== International career ==
Musasa was part of the DR Congo national team at the 2004 African Nations Cup, which finished bottom of its group in the first round of competition, thus failing to secure qualification for the quarter-finals.

== Career statistics ==
Scores and results list DR Congo's goal tally first, score column indicates score after each Musasa goal.

List of international goals scored by Kabamba Musasa
No.	Date	Venue	Opponent	Score	Result	Competition	Ref.
1	30 March 2003	Somhlolo National Stadium, Lobamba, Eswatini	Swaziland	1–1	1–1	2004 African Cup of Nations qualification	
2	8 June 2003	Stade des Martyrs, Kinshasa, Democratic Republic of the Congo	Swaziland	2–0	2–0	2004 African Cup of Nations qualification	
3	5 September 2004	Stade des Martyrs, Kinshasa, Democratic Republic of the Congo	South Africa	1–0	1–0	2006 FIFA World Cup qualification	
