= 2006 FIFA World Cup qualification – CAF first round =

Football tournament qualification stage

In the first round, 42 teams were paired 2-by-2 and played knockout matches home-and-away. The 21 winners would advance to the second round where they would meet the other 9 teams that qualify directly to the second round. Those teams are the 5 teams that qualified for the 2002 World Cup Finals (Cameroon, Nigeria, Senegal, South Africa and Tunisia) and the 4 highest-ranking teams in FIFA world rankings of 25 June 2003 (Congo DR, Ivory Coast, Egypt and Morocco).

== Seeding ==
Bolded teams advance to the second round.

Seeded	Unseeded
**Zimbabwe**; **Zambia**; **Algeria**; **Ghana**; **Burkina Faso**; **Mali**; **Kenya**; **Angola**; **Togo**; **Libya**; **Liberia**; **Congo**; **Malawi**; **Uganda**; Madagascar; **Sudan**; Swaziland; **Guinea**; **Rwanda**; **Gabon**; Lesotho	**Benin**; **Botswana**; Mozambique; Ethiopia; Mauritius; Namibia; Sierra Leone; Gambia; Burundi; **Cape Verde**; Eritrea; Tanzania; Chad; Niger; Central African Republic; Seychelles; Mauritania; Equatorial Guinea; Guinea-Bissau; Somalia; São Tomé and Príncipe

== Summary ==
Team 1	Agg.	Team 2	1st leg	2nd leg
Guinea-Bissau	1–4	**Mali**	1–2	0–2
Madagascar	3–4	**Benin**	1–1	2–3
Seychelles	1–5	**Zambia**	0–4	1–1
**Botswana**	4–1	Lesotho	4–1	0–0
Equatorial Guinea	1–2	**Togo**	1–0	0–2
São Tomé and Príncipe	0–9	**Libya**	0–1	0–8
Tanzania	0–3	**Kenya**	0–0	0–3
Niger	0–7	**Algeria**	0–1	0–6
**Uganda**	4–3	Mauritius	3–0	1–3 (a.e.t.)
**Sudan**	3–0	Eritrea	3–0	0–0
**Zimbabwe**	4–2	Mauritania	3–0	1–2
Swaziland	1–4	**Cape Verde**	1–1	0–3
Burundi	1–4	**Gabon**	0–0	1–4
Chad	3–3(a)	**Angola**	3–1	0–2
**Congo**	2–1	Sierra Leone	1–0	1–1
Ethiopia	1–3	**Malawi**	1–3	0–0
**Rwanda**	4–1	Namibia	3–0	1–1
**Guinea**	5–3	Mozambique	1–0	4–3
Gambia	2–3	**Liberia**	2–0	0–3
Somalia	0–7	**Ghana**	0–5	0–2
**Burkina Faso**	w/o	Central African Republic		

== Matches ==
10 October 2003
16:00 UTC±00:00

Guinea-Bissau	1–2	Mali
Fernandes 50'	Report	Keita 8'; Coulibaly 69'

Estádio 24 de Setembro, Bissau
Attendance: 22,000
Referee: Modou Sowe (Gambia)
14 November 2003
20:00 UTC±00:00

Mali	2–0	Guinea-Bissau
Coulibaly 15'; Sidibé 84' (pen.)	Report

Stade du 26 Mars, Bamako
Attendance: 13,251
Referee: Ba Seydou (Mauritania)

Mali won 4–1 on aggregate and advanced to the second round.

11 October 2003
14:30 UTC+03:00

Madagascar	1–1	Benin
Edmond 28'	Report	Adjamossi 74'

Mahamasina Stadium, Antananarivo
Attendance: 5,131
Referee: Eddy Maillet (Seychelles)
16 November 2003
16:00 UTC+01:00

Benin	3–2	Madagascar
Tchomogo 33' (pen.), 62', 90+2'	Report	Radonamahafalison 15'; Rakotondramanana 23'

Stade de l'Amitié, Cotonou
Attendance: 20,000
Referee: Emmanuel Imiere (Nigeria)

Benin won 4–3 on aggregate and advanced to the second round.

11 October 2003
15:00 UTC+04:00

Seychelles	0–4	Zambia
	Report	Kampamba 8'; Fichite 44'; Milanzi 52'; Numba 75'

Stade Linité, Victoria
Attendance: 2,700
Referee: Lim Kee Chong (Mauritius)
15 November 2003
15:00 UTC+02:00

Zambia	1–1	Seychelles
Milanzi 7'	Report	Suzette 69'

Independence Stadium, Lusaka
Attendance: 30,000
Referee: Isaack Abdulkadir (Tanzania)

Zambia won 5–1 on aggregate and advanced to the second round.

11 October 2003
15:00 UTC+02:00

Botswana	4–1	Lesotho
Molwantwa 7'; Gabolwelwe 44'; Selolwane 50', 53'	Report	Ramafole 64'

Botswana National Stadium, Gaborone
Attendance: 10,000
Referee: Luis Manuel Joao (Angola)
16 November 2003
15:00 UTC+02:00

Lesotho	0–0	Botswana
	Report

Setsoto Stadium, Maseru
Attendance: 9,000
Referee: Harris Shikapande (Zambia)

Botswana won 4–1 on aggregate and advanced to the second round.

11 October 2003
15:30 UTC+01:00

Equatorial Guinea	1–0	Togo
Barila 25' (pen.)	Report

Estadio La Libertad, Bata
Attendance: 25,000
Referee: Divine Evehe (Cameroon)
16 November 2003
15:30 UTC±00:00

Togo	2–0	Equatorial Guinea
Adebayor 43'; Salifou 53'	Report

Stade de Kégué, Lomé
Attendance: 12,000
Referee: Joseph Mandzioukouta (Congo)

Togo won 2–1 on aggregate and advanced to the second round.

11 October 2003
16:00 UTC±00:00

São Tomé and Príncipe	0–1	Libya
	Report	El Masli 85'

Estádio Nacional 12 de Julho, São Tomé
Attendance: 4,000
Referee: Koudougou Yameogo (Burkina Faso)
16 November 2003
22:00 UTC+02:00

Libya	8–0	São Tomé and Príncipe
El Masli 8', 17', 20'; El Taib 45', 63'; Suliman 54'; Osman 74'; El Rabty 88'	Report

March 28 Stadium, Benghazi
Attendance: 20,000
Referee: Hichem Guirat (Tunisia)

Libya won 9–0 on aggregate and advanced to the second round.

11 October 2003
16:00 UTC+03:00

Tanzania	0–0	Kenya
	Report

Tanzania National Stadium, Dar es Salaam
Attendance: 8,864
Referee: Hailemelak Tessema (Ethiopia)
15 November 2003
16:00 UTC+03:00

Kenya	3–0	Tanzania
Oliech 9', 32'; Origi 30'	Report

Moi International Sports Centre, Nairobi
Attendance: 14,000
Referee: Reda El-Beltagy (Egypt)

Kenya won 3–0 on aggregate and advanced to the second round.

11 October 2003
16:00 UTC+01:00

Niger	0–1	Algeria
	Report	Boutabout 63'

Stade Général Seyni Kountché, Niamey
Attendance: 20,126
Referee: Lim Kee Chong (Mauritius)
14 November 2003
21:30 UTC+01:00

Algeria	6–0	Niger
Cherrad 16', 22'; Akrour 42', 45', 82'; Boutabout 77'	Report

Stade 5 Juillet 1962, Algiers
Attendance: 53,200
Referee: Ba Seydou (Mauritania)

Algeria won 7–0 on aggregate and advanced to the second round.

11 October 2003
16:30 UTC+03:00

Uganda	3–0	Mauritius
Bajope 17'; Mubiru 35'; Obua 75'	Report

Nelson Mandela National Stadium, Kampala
Attendance: 56,000
Referee: Modou Sowe (Gambia)
16 November 2003
16:30 UTC+04:00

Mauritius	3–1 (a.e.t.)	Uganda
Nabuth 18'; Mourgine 32'; Louis 89'	Report	Obua 112'

Stade George V, Curepipe
Attendance: 27,000
Referee: Luis Manuel Joao (Angola)

Uganda won 4–3 on aggregate and advanced to the second round.

11 October 2003
20:00 UTC+03:00

Sudan	3–0	Eritrea
Tambal 68'; Elrasheed 72'; Ahmed 88' (pen.)	Report

Khartoum Stadium, Khartoum
Attendance: 39,000
Referee: Coffi Codjia (Benin)
14 November 2003
16:00 UTC+03:00

Eritrea	0–0	Sudan
	Report

Cicero Stadium, Asmara
Attendance: 12,000
Referee: Eddy Maillet (Seychelles)

Sudan won 3–0 on aggregate and advanced to the second round.

12 October 2003
15:00 UTC+02:00

Zimbabwe	3–0	Mauritania
A. Ndlovu 23'; Tembo 47'; P. Ndlovu 57'	Report

National Sports Stadium, Harare
Attendance: 55,000
Referee: Jerome Damon (South Africa)
14 November 2003
16:30 UTC±00:00

Mauritania	2–1	Zimbabwe
Langlet 3'; Sidibe 10'	Report	Mbwando 81'

Stade olympique, Nouakchott
Attendance: 3,000
Referee: Yakhouba Keita (Guinea)

Zimbabwe won 4–2 on aggregate and advanced to the second round.

12 October 2003
15:00 UTC+02:00

Swaziland	1–1	Cape Verde
Dlamini 64'	Report	Morais 55'

Somhlolo National Stadium, Lobamba
Attendance: 5,000
Referee: Berhane Teshome (Eritrea)
16 November 2003
16:00 UTC−01:00

Cape Verde	3–0	Swaziland
Cafú 51', 65'; Morais 90'	Report

Estádio da Várzea, Praia
Attendance: 6,000
Referee: Sharif Aboubacar (Ivory Coast)

Cape Verde won 4–1 on aggregate and advanced to the second round.

12 October 2003
15:15 UTC+02:00

Burundi	0–0	Gabon
	Report

Prince Louis Rwagasore Stadium, Bujumbura
Attendance: 10,000
Referee: Maxim Itur (Kenya)
15 November 2003
16:00 UTC+01:00

Gabon	4–1	Burundi
N'Zigou 2'; Mwinyi 16' (o.g.); Nguéma 38', 80'	Report	Nzeyimana 90'

Stade Omar Bongo, Libreville
Attendance: 15,000
Referee: Falla Ndoye (Senegal)

Gabon won 4–1 on aggregate and advanced to the second round.

12 October 2003
15:30 UTC+01:00

Chad	3–1	Angola
Oumar 53', 74', 83'	Report	Bruno Mauro 49'

Stade Omnisports Idriss Mahamat Ouya, N'Djamena
Attendance: 30,000
Referee: Monetchet Nahi (Ivory Coast)
16 November 2003
16:00 UTC+01:00

Angola	2–0	Chad
Akwá 42'; Bruno Mauro 57'	Report

Estádio da Cidadela, Luanda
Attendance: 30,000
Referee: Buenkadila Wabelo Bisingu (DR Congo)

3–3 on aggregate; Angola won on the away goals rule and advanced to the second round.

12 October 2003
15:30 UTC+01:00

Congo	1–0	Sierra Leone
Mvoubi 89' (pen.)	Report

Stade Alphonse Massamba, Brazzaville
Attendance: 4,800
Referee: Sule Mana (Nigeria)
16 November 2003
16:30 UTC±00:00

Sierra Leone	1–1	Congo
Koroma 58'	Report	Guié-Mien 67'

National Stadium, Freetown
Attendance: 20,000
Referee: Herminio Monteiro Lopes (Cape Verde)

Congo won 2–1 on aggregate and advanced to the second round.

12 October 2003
16:00 UTC+03:00

Ethiopia	1–3	Malawi
Getu 81' (pen.)	Report	Kanyenda 39', 55'; Mgangira 88'

Addis Ababa Stadium, Addis Ababa
Attendance: 20,000
Referee: Essam Abd El Fatah (Egypt)
15 November 2003
15:00 UTC+02:00

Malawi	0–0	Ethiopia
	Report

Civo Stadium, Lilongwe
Attendance: 20,000
Referee: Khaled Abdel Rahman (Sudan)

Malawi won 3–1 on aggregate and advanced to the second round.

12 October 2003
16:00 UTC+02:00

Rwanda	3–0	Namibia
Elias 43'; Karekezi 52'; Lomami 58'	Report

Stade Amahoro, Kigali
Attendance: 22,000
Referee: Isaack Abdulkadir (Tanzania)
15 November 2003
16:00 UTC+01:00

Namibia	1–1	Rwanda
Shipanga 39'	Report	Lomami 37'

Independence Stadium, Windhoek
Attendance: 9,000
Referee: Jean-Olivier Mbera (Gabon)

Rwanda won 4–1 on aggregate and advanced to the second round.

12 October 2003
16:30 UTC±00:00

Guinea	1–0	Mozambique
Bangoura 70'	Report

Stade du 28 Septembre, Conakry
Attendance: 13,400
Referee: Falla Ndoye (Senegal)
16 November 2003
15:30 UTC+02:00

Mozambique	3–4	Guinea
Dário 75', 80', 89'	Report	Youla 14'; Bangoura 21', 35', 54'

Estádio da Machava, Maputo
Attendance: 50,000
Referee: Walter Mochubela (South Africa)

Guinea won 5–3 on aggregate and advanced to the second round.

12 October 2003
17:00 UTC±00:00

Gambia	2–0	Liberia
Njie 64'; Sonko 79'	Report

Independence Stadium, Bakau
Attendance: 20,000
Referee: Coffi Codjia (Benin)
16 November 2003
16:00 UTC±00:00

Liberia	3–0	Gambia
Roberts 10'; Isaac Tondo 76', 83'	Report

Antoinette Tubman Stadium, Monrovia
Attendance: 10,000
Referee: Koman Coulibaly (Mali)

Liberia won 3–2 on aggregate and advanced to the second round.

16 November 2003
15:00 UTC±00:00

Somalia	0–5	Ghana
	Report	Arhin Duah 25', 56'; Boakye 69', 89'; Gyan 82'

Ohene Djan Stadium, Accra (Ghana)
Attendance: 19,447
Referee: Bakoubebile Bebou (Togo)
19 November 2003
16:00 UTC±00:00

Ghana	2–0	Somalia
Appiah 27'; Adjei 90'	Report

Baba Yara Stadium, Kumasi
Attendance: 12,000
Referee: Ibrahim Chaibou (Niger)

Ghana won 7–0 on aggregate and advanced to the second round.

Burkina Faso	w/o	Central African Republic

Central African Republic withdrew. Burkina Faso advanced to the second round.

== Goalscorers ==
There were 109 goals scored in 40 matches, for an average of 2.73 goals per match.

4 goals

- (Guinea) Sambégou Bangoura
- (Libya) Ahmed al Masli

3 goals

- (Algeria) Nassim Akrour
- (Benin) Oumar Tchomogo
- (Chad) Francis Oumar
- (Mozambique) Dário

2 goals

- (Algeria) Mansour Boutabout
- (Algeria) Abdelmalek Cherrad
- (Angola) Bruno Mauro
- (Botswana) Dipsy Selolwane
- (Cape Verde) Cafú
- (Cape Verde) Carlos Caló
- (Gabon) Stéphane N'Guéma
- (Ghana) Nana Arhin Duah
- (Ghana) Isaac Boakye
- (Kenya) Dennis Oliech
- (Liberia) Isaac Tondo
- (Libya) Tarik El Taib
- (Malawi) Essau Kanyenda
- (Mali) Soumaila Coulibaly
- (Rwanda) Jean Lomami
- (Uganda) David Obua
- (Zambia) Harry Milanzi

1 goal

- (Angola) Akwá
- (Benin) Anicet Adjamossi
- (Botswana) Nelson Gabolwelwe
- (Botswana) Tshepiso Molwantwa
- (Burundi) Gabriel Nzeyimana
- (Republic of the Congo) Rolf-Christel Guié-Mien
- (Republic of the Congo) Mbiamcie Mvoubi
- (Equatorial Guinea) Sergio Barila
- (Ethiopia) Teshome Getu
- (Gabon) Shiva N'zigou
- (The Gambia) Abdou-Rahman Njie
- (The Gambia) Edrissa Sonko
- (Ghana) Lawrence Adjei
- (Ghana) Stephen Appiah
- (Ghana) Asamoah Gyan
- (Guinea) Souleymane Youla
- (Guinea-Bissau) Dionisio Fernandes
- (Lesotho) Moses Ramafole
- (Liberia) Zizi Roberts
- (Libya) Mohamed El Rabty
- (Libya) Ahmed Saad Osman
- (Libya) Marei Suliman
- (Kenya) Mike Okoth Origi
- (Madagascar) Robert Edmond
- (Madagascar) J. Radonamahafalison
- (Madagascar) A. Rakotondramanana
- (Malawi) Peter Mgangira
- (Mali) Seydou Keita
- (Mali) Djibril Sidibé
- (Mauritania) Yohan Langlet
- (Mauritania) Ahmed Sidibe
- (Mauritius) Jerry Louis
- (Mauritius) Cyril Mourgine
- (Mauritius) Richardo Nabuth
- (Namibia) Paulus Shipanga
- (Rwanda) Joao Rafael Elias
- (Rwanda) Olivier Karekezi
- (Seychelles) Robert Suzette
- (Sierra Leone) Ibrahim Koroma
- (Sudan) Mujahid Ahmed
- (Sudan) Haitham Elrasheed
- (Sudan) Haytham Tambal
- (Eswatini) Siz Dlamini
- (Togo) Emmanuel Adebayor
- (Togo) Moustapha Salifou
- (Uganda) Assani Bajope
- (Uganda) Hassan Mubiru
- (Zambia) Dadley Fichite
- (Zambia) Gift Kampamba
- (Zambia) Mumamba Numba
- (Zimbabwe) George Mbwando
- (Zimbabwe) Adam Ndlovu
- (Zimbabwe) Peter Ndlovu
- (Zimbabwe) Kaitano Tembo

1 own goal

- (Burundi) Rajabu Mwinyi (against Gabon)
