= Ghana national football team results (2000–2009) =

Ghana football results

This is a list of the Ghana national football team results from 2000 to 2009.

== 2000 ==
18 January 2000 International friendly	Ghana	2-0	Tunisia	Accra, Ghana
		Report

22 January 2000 2000 AFCON GS	Ghana	1–1	Cameroon	Accra, Ghana
16:00	Ayew 57'	Report	Foé 19'	Stadium: Accra Sports Stadium; Attendance: 45,000; Referee: Ali Bujsaim (United Arab Emirates)

27 January 2000 2000 AFCON GS	Ghana	2–0	Togo	Accra, Ghana
16:00	Ayew 28'; Addo 37'	Report		Stadium: Accra Sports Stadium; Attendance: 30,000; Referee: Abderrahim Al-Arjoune (Morocco)

31 January 2000 2000 AFCON GS	Ghana	0–2	Ivory Coast	Accra, Ghana
16:00		Report	Kalou 45'; Sié 84'	Stadium: Accra Sports Stadium; Attendance: 40,000; Referee: Gamal Al-Ghandour (Egypt)

6 February 2000 2000 AFCON QF	South Africa	1–0	Ghana	Kumasi, Ghana
19:30	Nomvethe 42'	Report		Stadium: Kumasi Sports Stadium; Attendance: 40,000; Referee: Mourad Daami (Tunisia)

8 April 2000 2002 FIFA World Cup qualification – R1	Tanzania	0–1	Ghana	Arusha, Tanzania
16:00 (UTC+3)		Report	Kuffour 21'	Stadium: Sheikh Amri Abeid Memorial Stadium; Attendance: 13,000; Referee: Eusebio Alfredo (Mozambique)

23 April 2000 2002 FIFA World Cup qualification – R1	Ghana	3–2	Tanzania	Accra, Ghana
16:00 (UTC+0)	Kuffour 19'; Ahinful 28'; Addo 64'	Report	Lungu 44'; Abubakari 54'	Stadium: Ohene Djan Stadium; Attendance: 15,000; Referee: Abdou Diouf (Senegal)

17 June 2000 International friendly	Egypt	2-0	Ghana	Egypt
		Report

9 July 2000 2002 FIFA World Cup qualification – R2	Ghana	5–0	Sierra Leone	Accra, Ghana
16:00 UTC+0	Amoah 19', 61'; Akonnor 68'; Preko 75'; Addo 89' Report	Report		Stadium: Accra Sports Stadium; Attendance: 18,300; Referee: Modou Sowe (Gambia)

3 September 2000 2002 AFCON qualification	Lesotho	3–3	Ghana	Maseru, Lesotho
	Lephoto 47'; Majara 49'; Makhele 61'	Report	Amoah 27'; Duah 80', 88'	Stadium: Setsoto Stadium; Attendance: 11,000; Referee: Robin Williams (South Africa)

8 October 2000 2002 AFCON qualification	Ghana	4–1	Zimbabwe	Accra, Ghana
	Appiah 28'; Duah 42'; Amoah 48'; Akunnor 78' (pen.)	Report	Mwaruwari 47'	Stadium: Accra Sports Stadium; Attendance: 60,000; Referee: Gamal Al-Ghandour (Egypt)

25 October 2000 Castle Lager Cup	Uganda	2-1	Ghana	Kenya
		Report

28 October 2000 Castle Lager Cup	Tanzania	3-2	Ghana	Kenya
		Report

== 2001 ==
14 January 2001 2002 AFCON qualification	DR Congo	2–1	Ghana	Kinshasa, Democratic Republic of the Congo
	Dinzey 10'; Mbungu 13'	Report	Ayew 77'	Stadium: Stade des Martyrs; Attendance: 80,000; Referee: Coffi Codjia (Benin)

28 January 2001 2002 FIFA World Cup qualification – R2	Ghana	1–3	Liberia	Accra, Ghana
16:00 UTC+0	Duah 70'	Report	Seator 10'; Makor 85'; Shannon 89'	Stadium: Accra Sports Stadium; Attendance: 30,000; Referee: Mohamed Guezzaz (Morocco)

25 February 2001 2002 FIFA World Cup qualification – R2	Sudan	1–0	Ghana	Omdurman, Sudan
20:00 UTC+03	Moga 70'	Report		Stadium: Al Merreikh Stadium; Attendance: 30,000; Referee: Hailemelak Tessema (Ethiopia)

11 March 2001 2002 FIFA World Cup qualification – R2	Ghana	0–0	Nigeria	Accra, Ghana
16:00 UTC+0		Report		Stadium: Accra Sports Stadium; Attendance: 34,491; Referee: Felix Tangawarima (Zimbabwe)

25 March 2001 2002 AFCON qualification	Ghana	3–0	DR Congo	Accra, Ghana
	Allotey 17', 84'; Appiah 49'	Report		Stadium: Accra Sports Stadium; Attendance: 20,000; Referee: Gamal Al-Ghandour (Egypt)

5 May 2001 2002 FIFA World Cup qualification – R2	Sierra Leone	1–1	Ghana	Freetown, Sierra Leone
16:30 UTC+0	Bah 87'	Report	Ayew 35'	Stadium: National Stadium; Attendance: 35,000; Referee: Abdou Diouf (Senegal)

3 June 2001 2002 AFCON qualification	Zimbabwe	1–2	Ghana	Harare, Zimbabwe
	Mugeyi 15'	Report	Owusu-Ansah 39'; Boakye 89'	Stadium: National Stadium; Attendance: 35,000; Referee: Ahmed Auda (Egypt)

17 June 2001 2002 AFCON qualification	Ghana	3–1	Lesotho	Kumasi, Ghana
	Appiah 25'; Gyan 31'; Amoah 37'	Report	Nts'onyana 63'	Stadium: Kumasi Sports Stadium; Attendance: 30,000; Referee: Moussa Kanouté (Mali)

1 July 2001 2002 FIFA World Cup qualification – R2	Liberia	1–2	Ghana	Monrovia, Liberia
16:00 UTC+0	Sebwe 44'	Report	Amoah 32'; Boakye 58'	Stadium: National Complex; Attendance: 35,000; Referee: Kamel Berber (Algeria)

15 July 2001 2002 FIFA World Cup qualification – R2	Ghana	1–0	Sudan	Accra, Ghana
15:00 UTC+0	Kuffour 44'	Report		Stadium: Accra Sports Stadium; Attendance: 7,000; Referee: Lucien Bouchardeau (Niger)

29 July 2001 2002 FIFA World Cup qualification – R2	Nigeria	3–0	Ghana	Port Harcourt, Nigeria
16:00 UTC+01	Agali 1'; Babangida 18', 32'	Report		Stadium: Liberation Stadium; Attendance: 17,000; Referee: Hichem Guirat (Tunisia)

5 December 2001 International friendly	Algeria	1-1	Ghana	Algeria
		Report

25 December 2001 International friendly	Ghana	1-1	Mali	Mali
		Report

== 2002 ==
4 January 2002 International friendly	Egypt	2–0	Ghana	Egypt
		Report

21 January 2002 2002 AFCON GS	Morocco	0–0	Ghana	Ségou, Mali
16:00		Report		Stadium: Stade Amare Daou; Attendance: 4,000; Referee: Domenico Messina (Italy)

24 January 2002 2002 AFCON GS	South Africa	0–0	Ghana	Ségou, Mali
16:00		Report		Stadium: Stade Amare Daou; Attendance: 5,000; Referee: Mourad Daami (Tunisia)

30 January 2002 2002 AFCON GS	Burkina Faso	1–2	Ghana	Mopti, Mali
16:00	A. Touré 81'	Report	Boakye 90', 90+2'	Stadium: Stade Barema Bocoum; Attendance: 15,000; Referee: Chukwudi Chukwujekwu (Nigeria)

3 February 2002 2002 AFCON QF	Nigeria	1–0	Ghana	Bamako, Mali
19:00	Lawal 80'	Report		Stadium: Stade du 26 Mars; Attendance: 25,000; Referee: Mohamed Guezzaz (Morocco)

17 May 2002 International friendly	Slovenia	2–0	Ghana	Slovenia
		Report

7 September 2002 2004 AFCON qualification	Uganda	1–0	Ghana	Kampala, Uganda
	Obwiny 52'	Report		Stadium: Nakivubo Stadium; Attendance: 25,000; Referee: Hassan Mohamed (Somalia)

8 October 2002 International friendly	Ghana	2–1	Lesotho	Ghana
		Report

13 October 2002 2004 AFCON qualification	Ghana	4–2	Rwanda	Accra, Ghana
	Ntaganda 24' (o.g.); Mohammed 42'; Asampong 58'; Boateng 70' (pen.)	Report	Milly 16'; Ndikumana 43' (pen.)	Stadium: Accra Sports Stadium; Attendance: 40,000; Referee: Pare Lassina (Burkina Faso)

19 October 2002 International friendly	Sierra Leone	2–1	Ghana	Sierra Leone
		Report

15 December 2002 International friendly	Ghana	0-1	Nigeria	Ghana
		Report

22 December 2002 International friendly	Egypt	0-0	Ghana	Egypt
		Report

== 2003 ==
26 January 2003 International friendly	Ghana	3-0	Benin	Ghana
		Report

15 February 2003 International friendly	Benin	1-0	Ghana	Benin
		Report

27 March 2003 Friendly tournament	Tunisia	2-2	Ghana	Tunisia
		Report

30 March 2003 Friendly tournament	Madagascar	3-3	Ghana	Tunisia
		Report

30 May 2003 2004 AFCON qualification	Nigeria	3–1	Ghana
		Report

13 June 2003 International friendly	Ghana	1-3	Kenya	Ghana
		Report

22 June 2003 2004 AFCON qualification	Ghana	1–1	Uganda	Kumasi, Ghana
	Amoah 84'	Report	Bajope 16'	Stadium: Kumasi Sports Stadium

6 July 2003 2004 AFCON qualification	Rwanda	1–0	Ghana	Kigali, Rwanda
	Gatete 49'	Report		Stadium: Amahoro Stadium; Attendance: 40,000

16 November 2003 2006 FIFA World Cup qualification 1st Rd	Somalia	0-5	Ghana	Accra, Ghana
15:00 UTC+0	Arhin Duah 25', 56'; Boakye 69', 89'; Gyan 82'	Report		Stadium: Ohene Djan Stadium; Attendance: 19,447; Referee: Bakoubebile Bebou (Togo)

19 November 2003 2006 FIFA World Cup qualification 1st Rd	Ghana	2-0	Somalia	Kumasi, Ghana
16:00 UTC+0	Appiah 27'; Adjei 90'	Report		Stadium: Baba Yara Stadium; Attendance: 12,000; Referee: Ibrahim Chaibou (Niger)

== 2004 ==
28 April 2004 International friendly	Ghana	1-1	Angola	Ghana
		Report

5 June 2004 2006 FIFA World Cup qualification 2nd Rd	Burkina Faso	1-0	Ghana	Ouagadougou, Burkina Faso
16:00 UTC−1	Zongo 79'	Report		Stadium: Stade du 4 Août; Attendance: 30,0000; Referee: Hailemelak Tessema (Ethiopia)

14 June 2004 International friendly	Ghana	0-0	Togo	Ghana
		Report

20 June 2004 2006 FIFA World Cup qualification 2nd Rd	Ghana	3-0	South Africa	Kumasi, Ghana
15:00 UTC+0	Muntari 13'; Appiah 55', 78'	Report		Stadium: Baba Yara Stadium; Attendance: 32,000; Referee: Badara Diatta (Senegalese Football Federation)

25 June 2004 Independence tournament	Mozambique	0-1	Ghana	Mozambique
		Report

3 July 2004 2006 FIFA World Cup qualification 2nd Rd	Uganda	1-1	Ghana	Kampala, Uganda
16:30 UTC+3	Obua 45+1'	Report	Gyan 88'	Stadium: National Stadium; Attendance: 20,000; Referee: Reda El-Belagy (Egyptian Football Association)

5 September 2004 2006 FIFA World Cup qualification 2nd Rd	Ghana	2-0	Cape Verde	Kumasi, Ghana
15:00 UTC+0	Essien 24' (pen); Veiga	Report		Stadium: Baba Yara Stadium; Attendance: 35,000; Referee: Wahid Tamuni (Libya

10 October 2004 2006 FIFA World Cup qualification 2nd Rd	Ghana	0-0	DR Congo	Kumasi, Ghana
15:00 UTC+0		Report		Stadium: Baba Yara Stadium; Attendance: 30,000; Referee: Koman Coulibaly (Mali

== 2005 ==
23 March 2005 International friendly	Kenya	2-2	Ghana	Kenya
		Report

27 March 2005 2006 FIFA World Cup qualification 2nd Rd	DR Congo	1-1	Ghana	Kinshasa, Democratic Republic of the Congo
15:30 UTC+1	Nonda 50'	Report	Gyan 30'	Stadium: Stade des Martyrs; Attendance: 80,000; Referee: Modou Sowe (Gambia

5 June 2005 2006 FIFA World Cup qualification 2nd Rd	Ghana	2-1	Burkina Faso	Kumasi, Ghana
15:00 UTC+0	Appiah 66'; Amoah 83'	Report	Dagano	Stadium: Baba Yara Stadium; Attendance: 11,900; Referee: Essam Abdel-Fatah (Egypt

18 June 2005 2006 FIFA World Cup qualification 2nd Rd	South Africa	0-2	Ghana	Johannesburg, South Africa
15:30 UTC+2		Report	Amoah 59'; Essien 91'	Stadium: FNB Stadium; Attendance: 50,000; Referee: Mohamed Guezzaz (Morocco)

17 August 2005 International friendly	Ghana	0-0	Senegal	England, United Kingdom
		Report

4 September 2005 2006 FIFA World Cup qualification 2nd Rd	Ghana	2-0	Uganda	Kumasi, Ghana
16:30 UTC+0	Essien 10'; Amoah 15'	Report		Stadium: Baba Yara Stadium; Attendance: 45,000; Referee: Jean-Marie Hicuburundi (Burundi)

8 October 2005 2006 FIFA World Cup qualification 2nd Rd	Cape Verde	0-4	Ghana	Praia, Cape Verde
14:00 UTC−1		Report	Asamoah Frimpong 5'; Muntari 35'; Gyan 75'; Attram 87'	Stadium: Estádio da Várzea; Attendance: 6,500; Referee: Mourad Daami (Tunisia

14 November 2005 International friendly	Saudi Arabia	1-3	Ghana	Saudi Arabia
		Report

== 2006 ==
11 January 2006 International friendly	Togo	1-0	Ghana	Tunisia
		Report

15 January 2006 International friendly	Tunisia	2-0	Ghana	Tunisia
		Report

23 January 2006 2006 AFCON GS	Nigeria	1–0	Ghana	Port Said, Egypt
17:15 UTC+2	Taiwo 85'	Report		Stadium: Port Said Stadium; Attendance: 18,000; Referee: Essam Abd El Fatah (Egypt)

27 January 2006 2006 AFCON GS	Ghana	1–0	Senegal	Port Said, Egypt
17:15 UTC+2	Amoah 13'	Report		Stadium: Port Said Stadium; Attendance: 18,000; Referee: Abderrahim Al-Arjoune (Morocco)

31 January 2006 2006 AFCON GS	Ghana	1–2	Zimbabwe	Ismailia, Egypt
19:00 UTC+2	Adamu 90+2'	Report	Issah 60' (o.g.): Benjani 68'	Stadium: Ismailia Stadium; Attendance: 18,500; Referee: René Louzaya (Congo)

23 February 2006 CHAN GS	Ghana	2 - 2	Zimbabwe	Bouaké, Ivory Coast
15:00 UTC+0	A. Ayew 44', 67'	Reprt (Archived)	Karuru 5'; Philip Marufu 36'	Stadium: Stade Bouaké; Referee: Verson Lwanja, Malawi

1 March 2006 International friendly	Mexico	1-0	Ghana	United States
		Report

26 May 2006 Internaional friendly	Ghana	1-1	Turkey	Germany
		Report

29 May 2006 International friendly	Ghana	4-1	Jamaica	England, United Kingdom
		Report

4 June 2006 International friendly	Ghana	3-1	South Korea	Scotland, United Kingdom
		Report

12 June 2006 2006 FIFA World Cup GS	Italy	2-0	Ghana	Hanover
21:00 UTC+1	Pirlo 40' Iaquinta 83'	Report (Archived)		Stadium: Niedersachsenstadion; Attendance: 43,000; Referee: Simon (Brazil)

17 June 2006 2006 FIFA World Cup GS	Czech Republic	0-2	Ghana	Cologne
18:00 UTC+1		Report	Gyan 2' Muntari 82'	Stadium: RheinEnergieStadion; Attendance: 45,000; Referee: Horacio Elizondo (Argentina

22 June 2006 2006 FIFA World Cup GS	Ghana	2-1	United States	Nuremberg
16:00 UTC+1	Draman 22' Appiah 45+2' (pen)	Report	Dempsey	Stadium: Frankenstadion; Attendance: 41,000; Referee: Markus Merk (Germany)

27 June 2006 2006 FIFA World Round 16	Brazil	3-0	Ghana	Dortmund
17:00 UTC+1	Ronaldo 5' Adriano 45+1' Zé Roberto	Report		Stadium: Westfalenstadion; Attendance: 65,000; Referee: (Ľuboš Micheľ (Slovakia))

15 August 2006 International friendlly	Ghana	2-0	Togo	England, United Kingdom
		Report

4 October 2006 International friendly	Japan	0-1	Ghana	Japan
		Report

8 October 2006 International friendly	South Korea	1-3	Ghana	South Korea
		Report

14 November 2006 International friendly	Australia	1-1	Ghana	England, United Kingdom
		Report

== 2007 ==
6 February 2007 International friendly	Ghana	4-1	Nigeria	England, United Kingdom
		Report

24 March 2007 International friendly	Austria	1-1	Ghana	Austria
		Report

27 March 2007 International friendly	Brazil	1-0	Ghana	Sweden
		Report

21 August 2007 International friendly	Ghana	1-1	Senegal	England, United Kingdom
		Report

8 September 2007 International friendly	Ghana	2-0	Morocco	France
		Report

11 September 2007 International friendly	Saudi Arabia	5-0	Ghana	Saudi Arabia
		Report

18 November 2007 International friendly	Ghana	2-0	Togo	Ghana
		Report

21 November 2007 International friendly	Ghana	4-2	Benin	Ghana
		Report

== 2008 ==
20 January 2008 2008 AFCON GS	Ghana	2–1	Guinea	Ohene Djan Stadium, Accra
17:00	A. Gyan 55' (pen.); Muntari 90'	Report	Kalabane 65'	Attendance: 35,000; Referee: Eddy Maillet (Seychelles)

24 January 2008 2008 AFCON GS	Ghana	1–0	Namibia	Ohene Djan Stadium, Accra
19:30	Agogo 41'	Report		Attendance: 40,000; Referee: Kacem Bennaceur (Tunisia)

28 January 2008 2008 AFCON GS	Ghana	2–0	Morocco	Ohene Djan Stadium, Accra
17:00	Essien 26'; Muntari 45'	Report		Attendance: 40,000; Referee: Modou Sowe (Gambia)

3 February 2008 2008 AFCON QF	Ghana	2–1	Nigeria	Ohene Djan Stadium, Accra
17:00	Essien 45+2'; Agogo 83'	Report	Yakubu 35' (pen.)	Attendance: 45,000; Referee: Mohamed Benouza (Algeria)

7 February 2008 2008 AFCON SF	Ghana	0–1	Cameroon	Ohene Djan Stadium, Accra
17:00		Report	N'Kong 72'	Attendance: 40,000; Referee: Abderahim El Arjoune (Morocco)

9 February 2008 2008 AFCON 3rd place	Ghana	4–2	Ivory Coast	Baba Yara Stadium, Kumasi
17:00	Muntari 10'; Owusu-Abeyie 70'; Agogo 80'; Draman 84'	Report	Sanogo 24', 32'	Attendance: 40,000; Referee: Jerome Damon (South Africa)

26 March 2008 International friendly	Mexico	2-1	Ghana	England, United Kingdom
		Report

23 May 2008 International friendly	Australia	1-0	Ghana	Australia
		Report

1 June 2008 2010 FIFA World Cup qualification R2	Ghana	3-0	Libya	Kumasi, Ghana
17:00 UTC+0	Tagoe 16'; Agogo 55'; Kingston 67'	Report		Stadium: Baba Yara Stadium; Attendance: 31,000; Referee: Eddy Maillet (Seychelles)

8 June 2008 2010 FIFA World Cup qualification R2	Lesotho	2-3	Ghana	Bloemfontein, South Africa
18:00 UTC+2	Muso 90+1'; Seema 90+2'	Report	Kingston 15'; Agogo 42', 62'	Stadium: Seisa Ramabodu Stadium; Attendance: 19,000; Referee: Michael Gasingwa (Rwanda)

14 June 2008 2010 FIFA World Cup qualification R2	Gabon	2-0	Ghana	Libreville, Gabon
15:30 UTC+1	Méyé 42'; N'Guéma 66'	Report		Stadium: Stade Omar Bongo; Attendance: 39,000; Referee: Mohamed Benouza (Algeria)

22 June 2008 2010 FIFA World Cup qualification R2	Ghana	2-0	Gabon	Accra, Ghana
17:00 UTC+0	Tagoe 30'; Muntari 78'	Report		Stadium: Ohene Djan Stadium; Attendance: 29,040; Referee: Jerome Damon (South Africa)

20 August 2008 International friendly	Tanzania	1-1	Ghana	Tanzania
		Report

5 September 2008 2010 FIFA World Cup qualification R2	Libya	1-0	Ghana	Tripoli
22:00 UTC+2	Osman 84'	Report		Stadium: 11 June Stadium; Attendance: 45,000; Referee: Koman Coulibaly (Mali)

11 October 2008 2010 FIFA World Cup qualification R2	Ghana	3-0	Lesotho	Sekondi-Takoradi, Ghana
14:30 UTC+0	Appiah 19'; Agogo 24'; Amoah 67'	Report		Stadium: Sekondi Stadium; Attendance: 20,000; Referee: Khalid Abdel Rahman (Sudan)

15 October 2008 International friendly	South Africa	2-1	Ghana	South Africa
		Report

19 November 2008 International friendly	Ghana	0-0	Tunisia	Ghana
		Report

== 2009 ==
11 February 2009 International friendly	Egypt	2-2	Ghana	Egypt
		Report

1 March 2009 2009 CHAN GS	Ghana	3–0	DR Congo	Bouaké, Ivory Coast
16:00 UTC+0	Taylor 45+4'; Antwi 68'; Owusu-Ansah 79'	Report (Archived)		Stadium: Stade Bouaké; Referee: Rajindraparsad Seechurn (Mauritius)

4 March 2009 2009 CHAN SF	Ghana	1–1 (a.e.t.); Penalties; 7-6	Senegal	Bouaké, Ivory Coast
15:00 UTC+0	Antwi 31': D. Yeboah (penalty scored); S. Yeboah (penalty scored); Mohamed (penalty scored); Appiah (penalty scored); MacCarthy (penalty scored); Osei-Bonsu (penalty scored); Poku (penalty scored)	Report (Archived)	Sow 35': (penalty scored) Fall; (penalty scored) Diamanka; (penalty scored) Ndiour; (penalty scored) Mame Diallo; (penalty scored) Diouf; (penalty scored) Sidy N'Diaye; (penalty missed) Badiane	Stadium: Stade Bouaké; Attendance: 25,000; Referee: Jean-Claude Lebrosse (Seychelles)

8 March 2009 2009 CHAN Final	Ghana	0-2	DR Congo	Bouaké, Ivory Coast
16:00		Report (Archived)	Kaluyituka 46': Bedi 74'	Stadium: Stade Bouaké; Attendance: 35,000; Referee: Desiré Noumandiez Doué (Ivory Coast)

29 March 2009 2010 FIFA World Cup - CAF 3rd Rd	Ghana	1–0	Benin	Kumasi, Ghana
17:00 UTC+0	Tagoe 1'	Report		Stadium: Baba Yara Stadium; Attendance: 39,000; Referee: Daniel Bennett (South Africa)

31 May 2009 International friendly	Ghana	2-1	Uganda	Ghana
		Report

7 June 2009 2010 FIFA World Cup - CAF 3rd Rd	Mali	0–2	Ghana	Bamako, Mali
19:00 UTC+0		Report	Asamoah 67'; Amoah 79'	Stadium: Stade 26 mars Attendance: 40,000; Referee: Divine Evehe (Cameroon)

20 June 2009 2010 FIFA World Cup - CAF 3rd Rd	Sudan	0–2	Ghana	Omdurman, Sudan
20:30 UTC+3		Report	Amoah 6', 52'	Stadium: Al-Merrikh Stadium; Attendance: 30,000; Referee: Jamel Ambaya (Libya)

12 August 2009 International friendly	Ghana	4-1	Zambia	England, United Kingdom
		Report

6 September 2009 2010 FIFA World Cup - CAF 3rd Rd	Ghana	2-0	Sudan	Ghana
		Report

9 September 2009 International friendly	Japan	4-3	Ghana	Netherlands
		Report

30 September 2009 International friendly	Argentina	2–0	Ghana	Argentina
		Report

11 October 2009 2010 FIFA World Cup - CAF 3rd Rd	Benin	1–0	Ghana	Benin
		Report

15 November 2009 2010 FIFA World Cup - CAF 3rd Rd	Ghana	2-2	Mali	Ghana
		Report

18 November 2009 International friendly	Angola	0–0	Ghana	Angola
		Report
