= Assani =

Assani is a given name and surname. People with the name include:

Given name

- Assani Bajope (born 1982), Ugandan footballer
- Assani Lukimya-Mulongoti (born 1986), Congolese footballer

Surname

- Hamissi Assani (fl. 1990s), Mahoran politician
- Idris Assani (fl. 1980s–2010s), Beninese mathematician
- Jeanine Assani Issouf (born 1992), French athlete
- Mohamed Assani (fl. 2000s–2020s), Vancouver-based sitar player and composer
- Ryad Assani-Razaki (born 1981), Beninese-Canadian writer

== See also ==
- Dennis Assanis (fl. 1990s–2020s), Greek academic administrator, scientist, engineer and author
