= 2004 CAF Confederation Cup =

International football competition in Africa

Confederation of African Football Confederation Cup

Tournament details
- Dates: 6 March 2004 – 9 January
- Teams: 55

Final positions
- Champions: (Ghana) Hearts of Oak (1st title)
- Runners-up: (Ghana) Asante Kotoko

Tournament statistics
- Matches played: 104
- Goals scored: 299 (2.88 per match)
- Top scorer(s): (Nigeria) Ugochukwu Okeke (Zambia) Christopher Katongo (5 goals each)

The 2004 CAF Confederation Cup was the first edition of the newly created CAF Confederation Cup. Hearts of Oak of Ghana beat fellow Ghanaians Asante Kotoko 8-7 on penalties in the final after the two legs ended 2-2.

== Qualifying rounds ==
=== Preliminary round ===
Team 1	Agg.	Team 2	1st leg	2nd leg
Stade Tunisien (Tunisia)	6–3	(Senegal) ASC Thiès	6–0	0–3
Olympic Real (Central African Republic)	w/o	(Angola) Petro do Huambo	—	—
Saint Louis Suns United (Seychelles)	2–6	(Madagascar) Léopards de Transfoot	2–2	0–4
Ferroviário de Nampula (Mozambique)	1–6	(South Africa) Wits University FC	1–2	0–4
Kiyovu Sport (Rwanda)	1–3	(Gabon) USM Libreville	0–1	1–2
Chemelil Sugar FC (Kenya)	1–4	(Tanzania) Mtibwa Sugar FC	0–2	1–2
Savanne SC (Mauritius)	0–3	(Zimbabwe) Dynamos FC	0–0	0–3
Al-Merrikh (Sudan)	1–2	(Zambia) Green Buffaloes	1–0	0–2
Express FC (Uganda)	2–1	Ethiopia Bunna	2–1	0–0
Diables Noirs (Republic of the Congo)	2–2 (a)	(Equatorial Guinea) Deportivo Mongomo	2–2	0–0
Étoile Filante (Burkina Faso)	2–0	(Togo) Dynamic Togolais	2–0	0–0
Mogas 90 FC (Benin)	2–5	(Libya) Al-Nasr	2–2	0–3
ASC Entente Sebkha (Mauritania)	0–4	(Guinea) Étoile de Guinée	0–2	0–2
Djoliba AC (Mali)	2–3	(The Gambia) Wallidan FC	1–0	1–3
CO Bouaflé (Ivory Coast)	3–3 (a)	(Niger) Olympic FC	3–2	0–1

=== First round ===
Team 1	Agg.	Team 2	1st leg	2nd leg
Interclube (Angola)	2–4	(Senegal) AS Douanes	1–2	1–2
PWD Bamenda (Cameroon)	2–2 (a)	(Democratic Republic of the Congo) TP Mazembe	1–0	1–2
Ismaily SC (Egypt)	2–3	(Tunisia) Stade Tunisien	2–1	0–2
Petro do Huambo (Angola)	2–5	(Ghana) Liberty Professionals	1–0	1–5
Léopards de Transfoot (Madagascar)	3–3 (a)	(South Africa) Wits University FC	1–1	2–2
USM Libreville (Gabon)	3–3 (a)	(Cameroon) Sable FC	2–2	1–1
Mtibwa Sugar FC (Tanzania)	0-6	(South Africa) Santos	0–3	0-3 ^{1}
Dynamos FC (Zimbabwe)	0–5	(Ghana) King Faisal Babes	0–1	0–4
Green Buffaloes (Zambia)	7–3	(Democratic Republic of the Congo) DC Motema Pembe	6–1	1–2
Express FC (Uganda)	1–4	(Nigeria) Lobi Stars FC	1–1	0–3
Deportivo Mongomo (Equatorial Guinea)	1–3	(Ivory Coast) Stella Club d'Adjamé	1–1	0–2
Étoile Filante (Burkina Faso)	0–1	(Morocco) Wydad AC	0–1	0–0
Al-Nasr (Libya)	1–4	(Nigeria) Enugu Rangers	1–0	0–4
Etoile Guinee (Guinea)	2–2 (a)	(Algeria) CR Belouizdad	1–0	1–2
Wallidan FC (The Gambia)	1–1 (a)	(Tunisia) Club Africain	0–0	1–1
FAR Rabat (Morocco)	6–2	(Niger) Olympic FC	3–0	3–2

^{1} Mtibwa Sugar withdrew before the 2nd leg. but mtibwa sugar was seemed to be challenging team in Tanzania

=== Second round ===
Team 1	Agg.	Team 2	1st leg	2nd leg
PWD Bamenda (Cameroon)	2–5	(Senegal) AS Douanes	2–2	0–3
Liberty Professionals (Ghana)	4–3	(Tunisia) Stade Tunisien	3–2	1–1
Sable FC (Cameroon)	6–2	(Madagascar) Léopards de Transfoot	4–1	2–1
King Faisal Babes (Ghana)	2–3	(South Africa) Santos	1–1	1–2
Lobi Stars FC (Nigeria)	4–5	(Zambia) Green Buffaloes	2–1	2–4
Stella Club d'Adjamé (Ivory Coast)	1–2	(Morocco) Wydad AC	0–0	1–2
Etoile Guinee (Guinea)	1–2	(Nigeria) Enugu Rangers	0–0	1–2
FAR Rabat (Morocco)	1–1 (a)	(Tunisia) Club Africain	0–0	1–1

=== Play-off round ===
In this round, the 8 winners of the round of 16 play the losers of the round of 16 of the Champions League for 8 places in the group stage.

Team 1	Agg.	Team 2	1st leg	2nd leg
Asante Kotoko (Ghana)	3–1	(Morocco) Wydad AC	2–0	1–1
Orlando Pirates (South Africa)	4-5	(Cameroon) Sable FC	4–2	0-3
APR FC (Rwanda)	1–3	(Nigeria) Enugu Rangers	1–0	0–3
Coton Sport FC (Cameroon)	4–1	(Zambia) Green Buffaloes	3–0	1–1
Petro de Luanda (Angola)	1–0	(Morocco) FAR Rabat	0–0	1–0
Hearts of Oak (Ghana)	1–0	(Senegal) AS Douanes	1–0	0–0
Al-Hilal (Sudan)	1–1 (3–0 p)	(Ghana) Liberty Professionals	1–0	0–1
Canon Yaoundé (Cameroon)	1–3	(South Africa) Santos	1–1	0–2

Notes

1. The match was abandoned at 50' with the score at 0-0 due to torrential rain. The replay was postponed twice due to torrential rain, being rescheduled for 15 August, but Orlando Pirates FC failed to appear as the team had returned to South Africa. Sable were awarded a 3-0 victory - which advanced them to the next round - while Orlando were disqualified and fined $5000.

== Group stage ==
Key to colours in group tables
Group winners advance to the final

=== Group A ===
Team	Pts	Pld	W	D	L	GF	GA	GD
(Ghana) Asante Kotoko	10	6	3	1	2	10	7	+3
(Nigeria) Enugu Rangers	10	6	3	1	2	12	6	+6
(Sudan) Al-Hilal	9	6	3	0	3	6	11	+5
(Angola) Petro de Luanda	5	6	1	2	3	5	9	-4

=== Group B ===
Team	Pts	Pld	W	D	L	GF	GA	GD
(Ghana) Hearts of Oak	13	6	4	1	1	10	5	+5
(Cameroon) Coton Sport FC	11	6	3	2	1	9	3	+6
(Cameroon) Sable FC	7	6	2	1	3	6	9	-3
(South Africa) Santos FC	3	6	1	0	5	3	11	-8

== Knockout stage ==
=== Final ===
2 January 2005
--:-- UTC+0

Hearts of Oak (Ghana)	1–1	(Ghana) Asante Kotoko
Agyemang 90'		M. Osei 61'

Accra Sports Stadium, Accra
9 January 2005
--:-- UTC+0

Asante Kotoko (Ghana)	1–1	(Ghana) Hearts of Oak
Taylor 53'		Adjah-Tetteh 81'
Penalties
Ansah (penalty missed); Ahmed (penalty scored); F. Osei (penalty scored); Chibsah (penalty scored); Asante (penalty scored); G. Yeboah (penalty scored); D. Yeboah (penalty scored); Appiah (penalty scored); Hendricks (penalty missed)	7–8	(penalty missed) Mireku; (penalty scored) Quaye; (penalty scored) Kuffour; (penalty scored) Bossman; (penalty scored) Harrison; (penalty scored) Adjei; (penalty scored) Morgan; (penalty scored) Adjah-Tetteh; (penalty scored) Donkor

Kumasi Sports Stadium, Kumasi

== Top goal scorers ==
The top scorers from the 2004 CAF Confederation Cup are as follows:

Rank	Name	Team	Goals
1	(Nigeria) Ugochukwu Okeke	(Nigeria) Enugu Rangers	5
1	(Zambia) Christopher Katongo	(Zambia) Green Buffaloes	5
2	(Angola) Flávio	(Angola) Petro de Luanda	4
2	(Cameroon) Herman Dzumafo	(Cameroon) Sable FC	4
2	(Cameroon) Bernard Ngom	(Cameroon) Sable FC	4
2	(Ghana) Eric Gawu	(Ghana) King Faisal Babes	4
2	(Libya) Ahmed Saad	(Libya) Al-Nasr	4
2	(Madagascar) Francky Randrianasoliana	(Madagascar) Léopards de Transfoot	4
2	(Zambia) Jimmy Mumba	(Zambia) Green Buffaloes	4
