= Ahmed Sidibé =

Ahmed Sidibé may refer to:

- Ahmed Sidibé (footballer, born 1974), Mauritanian football manager and former striker
- Ahmed Sidibé (footballer, born 2002), French football centre-back for Venezia
