= Teshome =

Teshome is an Ethiopian name that may refer to:

- Teshome Toga (born 1968), Ethiopian politician
- Teshome Soromessa (born 1970), Author and Professor
- Teshome Dirirsa (born 1994), Ethiopian middle-distance runner
- Teshome Gabriel (1939–2010), Ethiopian-born American cinema scholar and professor
- Teshome Getu (born 1983), Ethiopian footballer
- Meron Teshome (born 1992), Eritrean cyclist
- Minyahil Teshome (born 1985), Ethiopian footballer
- Mulatu Teshome (born 1955), President of Ethiopia
- Theodros Teshome (born 1970), Ethiopian film actor and director
