= Jean-Jacques Radonamahafalison =

Malagasy footballer

Personal information
- Date of birth: 20 August 1978 (age 48)
- Position: Midfielder

Senior career*
Years	Team	Apps	(Gls)
1996–1997	Sirama		
1998–2000	AS Fortior		
2001	AS Port		
2002	Léopards de Transfoot		
2002	AS Marsouins		
2003—2006	Saint-Pauloise FC		
2007–2010	AS Marsouins		

International career
1998–2003	Madagascar	19	(2)
- * Club domestic league appearances and goals

Jean-Jacques Radonamahafalison (born 20 August 1978) is a Malagasy former footballer who played as a midfielder.

== Career statistics ==
=== International ===
Appearances and goals by national team and year
National team	Year	Apps	Goals
Madagascar	1998	1	0
Madagascar	1999	–	
Madagascar	2000	4	0
Madagascar	2001	5	0
Madagascar	2002	4	0
Madagascar	2003	5	2
Total		19	2

Scores and results list Madagascar's goal tally first, score column indicates score after each Radonamahafalison goal.

List of international goals scored by Jean-Jacques Radonamahafalison
No.	Date	Venue	Opponent	Score	Result	Competition
1	22 February 2003	Mahamasina Municipal Stadium, Antananarivo, Madagascar	Mauritius	2–0	2–1	2003 COSAFA Cup
2	16 November 2003	Stade de l'Amitié, Cotonou, Benin	Benin	1–0	2–3	2006 FIFA World Cup qualification
