= Ablade =

Ablade is both a surname and a given name. Notable people with the name include:

- Seth Ablade (born 1983), Ghanaian footballer
- Ablade Glover (born 1934), Ghanaian artist and educator.
- Ablade Kumah (born 1970), Ghanaian footballer
- Ablade Morgan (born 1980), Ghanaian footballer
