= Mumamba Numba =

Zambian footballer (born 1978)

Managerial career
- Years: Team
- 2017-2020: Zanaco F.C.
- 2020-2022: ZESCO United F.C.
- 2022-2025: Kabwe Warriors F.C.
- 2025-: Zanaco F.C.

Mumamba Numba (born 21 March 1978) is a former Zambia International football midfielder who used to play for Zanaco FC. He had joined the team in 2001 from Konkola Blades. As of 2025, he is the head coach Zanaco F.C..

He represented the Zambia national team at the African Cup of Nations in 2000 and 2006.

== Playing career ==
=== International ===
Appearances and goals by national team and year
| National team | Year | Apps | Goals |
|---|---|---|---|
| Zambia | 1998 | 5 | 0 |
| Zambia | 1999 | 7 | 0 |
| Zambia | 2000 | 6 | 0 |
| Zambia | 2001 | 4 | 0 |
| Zambia | 2002 | 6 | 0 |
| Zambia | 2003 | 3 | 1 |
| Zambia | 2004 | 11 | 2 |
| Zambia | 2005 | 6 | 2 |
| Zambia | 2006 | 2 | 0 |
| Total | | 50 | 5 |

Scores and results list Zambia's goal tally first, score column indicates score after each Numba goal.

List of international goals scored by Mumamba Numba
| No. | Date | Venue | Opponent | Score | Result | Competition | Ref. |
|---|---|---|---|---|---|---|---|
| 1 | 11 October 2003 | Stade Linité, Victoria, Seychelles | Seychelles | 4–0 | 4–0 | 2006 FIFA World Cup qualification | |
| 2 | 25 May 2004 | Khartoum, Sudan | Sudan | 1–0 | 2–0 | Friendly | |
| 3 | 31 July 2004 | Independence Stadium, Lusaka, Zambia | Mauritius | 2–0 | 3–1 | 2004 COSAFA Cup | |
| 4 | 1 October 2005 | Samuel Kanyon Doe Sports Complex, Paynesville, Liberia | Liberia | 3–0 | 5–0 | 2006 FIFA World Cup qualification | |
| 5 | 11 December 2005 | Lubumbashi, DR Congo | DR Congo | 1–0 | 1–1 | Friendly | |

== Coaching career ==
Following Numba's departure from Kabwe Warriors to Zanoco at the beginning of 2025, Warriors refused to grant clearance, meaning Numba could not sit on the technical bench at the start of the season.
