= Jimmy Radafison =

Malagasy footballer

Personal information
- Date of birth: March 15, 1980 (age 46)
- Place of birth: Madagascar
- Position: Defender

Team information
- Current team: Saint Louis Suns United

Senior career*
Years	Team	Apps	(Gls)
1998–2000	FC BFV		
2001–2002	Stade Olympique de l'Emyrne		
2003–2004	Leopards Transfoot		
2005	Croix de Savoie Gaillard	4	(0)
2006–2007	Fanilo Japan Actuels		
2007–	Saint Louis Suns United		

International career
2000–	Madagascar	47	(0)
- * Club domestic league appearances and goals

Jimmy Radafison (born March 15, 1980) is a Malagasy footballer currently plays for Saint Louis Suns United.

== Honours ==
=== Club ===
Stade Olympique de l'Emyrne

- THB Champions League (1) : Champion : 2001

Leopards Transfoot Toamasina

- Coupe de Madagascar (1) : 2003

St. Louis Suns United

- Seychelles FA Cup (1) : 2010

St. Michel United

- Seychelles First Division (2) : 2014,2015

Côte d'Or FC

- Seychelles First Division (1) : 2016

=== National team ===
- Football at the Indian Ocean Island Games silver medal:2007
