= Mazinot Valentin =

Malagasy footballer

Valentin Mazinot
Personal information
- Date of birth: February 14, 1982 (age 44)
- Place of birth: Madagascar
- Position: Central defender

Team information
- Current team: USCA Foot

Senior career*
| Years | Team | Apps | (Gls) |
| 2001–2005 | Leopards Transfoot | | |
| 2006– | USCA Foot | | |

International career
| 2001–2007 | Madagascar | 10 | (0) |
- * Club domestic league appearances and goals

Valentin Mazinot (born February 14, 1982) is a Malagasy footballer currently plays for USCA Foot in Analamanga.
