= Brian Brendell =

Namibian footballer

Personal information
- Date of birth: 7 September 1986 (age 40)
- Place of birth: Rehoboth, South West Africa
- Height: 1.79 m (5 ft 10 in)
- Position: Midfielder

Team information
- Current team: Civics
- Number: 20

Senior career*
Years	Team	Apps	(Gls)
2005–2009	Civics		
2010–2011	Ramblers		
2011–	Civics		

International career
2006–2008	Namibia	18	(5)
- * Club domestic league appearances and goals

Brian Brendell (born 7 September 1986, in Rehoboth) is a Namibian football midfielder with FC Civics of the Namibia Premier League. A member of the Namibia national football team, he competed with the team at the 2008 Africa Cup of Nations.
