= Dário Monteiro =

Mozambican footballer

Dário
Personal information
- Full name: Dário Alberto Jesus Monteiro
- Date of birth: 27 February 1977 (age 49)
- Place of birth: Maputo, Mozambique
- Height: 1.80 m (5 ft 11 in)
- Position: Striker

Senior career*
Years	Team	Apps	(Gls)
1995–1996	Desportivo Maputo		
1996–2003	Académica	163	(75)
2003–2004	Al-Jazira		
2004–2005	Académica	26	(6)
2005–2006	Vitória Guimarães	24	(1)
2006–2007	Estrela Amadora	15	(3)
2007–2008	Nea Salamis	24	(2)
2008–2009	Mamelodi Sundowns	14	(4)
2009–2010	Supersport United	19	(5)
2011	Muçulmana Maputo		
2012	Desportivo Maputo		

International career
1996–2011	Mozambique	40	(16)

Managerial career
- 2019–: Desportivo de Maputo
- 2019–: Mozambique U20
- * Club domestic league appearances and goals

Dário Alberto Jesus Monteiro (born 27 February 1977), known simply as Dário, is a Mozambican retired footballer who played as a striker.

He spent most of his professional career in Portugal, amassing Primeira Liga totals of 138 games and 35 goals over the course of seven seasons, mainly at the service of Académica. Towards the end of his career, he played two years in South Africa.

Dário appeared with the Mozambique national team in two Africa Cup of Nations tournaments.

== Playing career ==
=== Club career ===
Born in Maputo, Dário arrived in 1996 to Portugal from local Desportivo de Maputo, signing with Académica de Coimbra. After tentative starts he became one of the club's most important players, scoring goals in the Primeira Liga at an impressive rate – in his last five full seasons in his first spell, he only netted once in single digits and averaged 14 per campaign, always ranking high in the scoring charts.

Late into 2003, Dário earned himself a lucrative contract in the United Arab Emirates, joining Al-Jazira Club. Unsettled, he quickly returned to Portugal and Académica; in his only season in his second stint he only scored six times, but ranked first in his team, which barely avoided top flight relegation.

Dário also played with Vitória S.C. and C.F. Estrela da Amadora in Portugal, with very little impact, after which he left to Cyprus with Nea Salamis Famagusta FC. In the following year he moved countries again, successively representing in South Africa Supersport United F.C. and Mamelodi Sundowns FC.

In the summer of 2010, Dário was released by the Sundowns, stating he had offers from Angola and Greece. After any move failed to materialize he returned to his country and signed for reigning Moçambola champions Liga Muçulmana de Maputo, in late December.

=== International career ===
Dário played for Mozambique at the 1998 Africa Cup of Nations in Burkina Faso as the national team finished bottom of their group (losing every match in the process), and also appeared in the 2010 edition in Angola, helping the nation to the quarter-final stage. He totalled 40 caps and 16 goals, during 15 years.

==== International goals ====
Scores and results list Mozambique's goal tally first.

No	Date	Venue	Opponent	Score	Result	Competition
1.	15 August 1998	Estádio da Machava, Maputo, Mozambique	Botswana	1–1	2–1	2000 Africa Cup of Nations qualification
2.	15 August 1998	Estádio da Machava, Maputo, Mozambique	Botswana	2–1	2–1	2000 Africa Cup of Nations qualification
3.	4 October 1998	Estádio da Machava, Maputo, Mozambique	Eritrea	1–0	3–1	2000 Africa Cup of Nations qualification
4.	28 May 1999	Botswana National Stadium, Gaborone, Botswana	Botswana	1–0	2–0	1999 COSAFA Cup
5.	16 July 2000	Estádio da Machava, Maputo, Mozambique	Lesotho	1–0	1–0	2002 Africa Cup of Nations qualification
6.	30 March 2003	Estádio da Machava, Maputo, Mozambique	Burkina Faso	1–0	1–0	2004 Africa Cup of Nations qualification
7.	16 November 2003	Estádio da Machava, Maputo, Mozambique	Guinea	1–4	3–4	2006 FIFA World Cup qualification
8.	16 November 2003	Estádio da Machava, Maputo, Mozambique	Guinea	2–4	3–4	2006 FIFA World Cup qualification
9.	16 November 2003	Estádio da Machava, Maputo, Mozambique	Guinea	3–4	3–4	2006 FIFA World Cup qualification
10.	3 June 2007	Estádio da Machava, Maputo, Mozambique	Burkina Faso	1–0	3–1	2008 Africa Cup of Nations qualification
11.	15 June 2008	Mahamasina Municipal Stadium, Antananarivo, Madagascar	Madagascar	1–0	1–1	2010 FIFA World Cup qualification
12.	20 August 2010	Estádio da Machava, Maputo, Mozambique	Swaziland	1–0	3–0	Friendly
13.	20 August 2010	Estádio da Machava, Maputo, Mozambique	Swaziland	2–0	3–0	Friendly
14.	11 February 2009	Estádio da Machava, Maputo, Mozambique	Malawi	1–0	2–0	Friendly
15.	14 November 2009	Estádio da Machava, Maputo, Mozambique	Tunisia	1–0	1–0	2010 FIFA World Cup qualification
16.	8 October 2011	Estádio da Machava, Maputo, Mozambique	Comoros	2–0	3–0	2012 Africa Cup of Nations qualification

== Coaching career ==
Dário is manager of Desportivo de Maputo and the Mozambique national under-20 football team.
