= USCA Foot =

Malagasy football club

- Full name: Union Sportive de la Commune; Urbaine d'Antananarivo – Football
- Ground: Mahamasina Stadium; Antananarivo, Madagascar
- Capacity: 24,000
- Chairman: Innocent Rakotodrianantsoro
- Manager: Jules Accorsi
- League: THB Champions League

USCA Foot (Union Sportive de la Commune Urbaine d'Antananarivo) is a football club based in Antananarivo, Madagascar They won the THB Champions League and the Coupe de Madagascar in 2005 and were runners-up in the Coupe in 2004 and 2006. It also competed in the CAF Champions League 2006 beating SS Excelsior of Réunion and Mamelodi Sundowns of South Africa, but failed to qualify for the group stage after losing to Ghanaians Asante Kotoko.

== Achievements ==
- THB Champions League: 1

2005

- Coupe de Madagascar: 1

2005

== Performance in CAF competitions ==
- CAF Champions League: 1 appearance

2006 – second round

- CAF Confederation Cup: 1 appearance

2005 – first round
2006 – intermediate round

== 2024 performance ==
In 2024 USCA Foot reached the 1/4 finals of the Coupe de Madagascar that was lost 1:0 against Inate FC Rouge. The goal was marked by Rina (90+11).

- USCA Foot (Analamanga) - Inate FC Rouge (Vakinankaratra) 0 : 1

== Current squad ==
Note: Flags indicate national team as defined under FIFA eligibility rules; some limited exceptions apply. Players may hold more than one non-FIFA nationality.

No.	Pos.	Nation	Player
1	GK	(Madagascar) MAD	Herve Alda Andriamahenika
2	DF	(Madagascar) MAD	Mazinot Valentin
3	DF	(Madagascar) MAD	Yves Xavier Ranomezanjanahary
4	DF	(Madagascar) MAD	Mamisoa Razafindrakoto
5	DF	(Madagascar) MAD	Jean Tholix

No.	Pos.	Nation	Player
6	MF	(Madagascar) MAD	Williamo Seraphin Randriamanjato
7	MF	(Madagascar) MAD	Alain Rakotondramanana
8	MF	(Madagascar) MAD	Rivomanatsoa Rasolonanahary
9	FW	(Madagascar) MAD	Jean Freddy Rasolofomalala
