= Kaitano Tembo =

Zimbabwean footballer (born 1970)

Personal information
- Date of birth: 22 July 1970 (age 56)
- Height: 1.83 m (6 ft 0 in)
- Position: Defender

Team information
- Current team: Venda

Senior career*
Years	Team	Apps	(Gls)
–1997	Dynamos		
1998–1999	Seven Stars		
1999–2006	SuperSport United		

International career
1997–2004	Zimbabwe	34	(3)

Managerial career
- 2014: SuperSport United
- 2018–2022: SuperSport United
- 2022: Sekhukhune United
- 2022–2023: Dynamos
- 2023: Richards Bay
- 2026: Zimbabwe (interim)
- 2026–: Venda
- * Club domestic league appearances and goals

Kaitano Tembo (born 22 July 1970) is a Zimbabwean retired football defender and a former SuperSport United head coach. A Zimbabwean international, he played at the 1999, 2000 and 2003 COSAFA Cup and the 2004 African Cup of Nations. He has managed clubs in South Africa.

Tembo was appointed interim national manager of Zimbabwe in April 2026, leaving the role in August 2026.

In September 2026, Tembo was appointed head coach of South African National First Division club Venda.

== Career statistics ==
=== International ===
Appearances and goals by national team and year
National team	Year	Apps	Goals
Zimbabwe	1997	9	0
Zimbabwe	1998	5	0
Zimbabwe	1999	3	1
Zimbabwe	2000	3	1
Zimbabwe	2001	2	0
Zimbabwe	2002	2	0
Zimbabwe	2003	7	1
Zimbabwe	2004	3	0
Total		34	3

Scores and results list Zimbabwe's goal tally first, score column indicates score after each Tembo goal.

List of international goals scored by Kaitano Tembo
No.	Date	Venue	Opponent	Score	Result	Competition
1	18 July 1999	Somhlolo National Stadium, Lobamba, Swaziland	Swaziland	1–0	1–1 (3–4 p)	1999 COSAFA Cup
2	29 July 2000	Boet Erasmus Stadium, Port Elizabeth, South Africa	South Africa	1–0	1–0	2000 COSAFA Cup
3	12 October 2003	National Sports Stadium, Harare, Zimbabwe	Mauritania	2–0	3–0	2006 FIFA World Cup qualification
