= Sergio Barila =

Equatoguinean football player and agent

Personal information
- Full name: Sergio Javier Barila Martínez
- Date of birth: 15 March 1973 (age 53)
- Place of birth: Valencia, Spain
- Height: 1.88 m (6 ft 2 in)
- Position: Left-back

Senior career*
Years	Team	Apps	(Gls)
1992–1995	Valencia B		
1992–1993	→ Atlético Saguntino (loan)		
1993–1994	→ Barbastro (loan)		
1994–1995	→ Alcoyano (loan)	31	(7)
1995–1996	Pontevedra	27	(3)
1996–1997	Castellón	16	(5)
1997	Mérida	6	(0)
1997–1998	Levante	12	(1)
1998–2000	Cartagonova	44	(0)
2000–2001	Gimnàstic	26	(1)
2001–2002	Getafe	13	(1)
2002–2004	Benidorm	5	(0)
Total		180	(18)

International career
2003	Equatorial Guinea	3	(1)
- * Club domestic league appearances and goals

Sergio Javier Barila Martínez (born 15 March 1973) is a former professional footballer who played as a left-back.

He amassed Segunda División B totals of 157 matches and 17 goals, during seven seasons.

Born in Spain, Barila represented Equatorial Guinea at international level.

== Club career ==
Born in Valencia, Barila played for Valencia CF Mestalla, Atlético Saguntino, UD Barbastro, CD Alcoyano, Pontevedra CF, CD Castellón, CP Mérida, Levante UD, FC Cartagena, Gimnàstic de Tarragona, Getafe CF and Benidorm CF. He retired at the age of 31 after nearly a year on the sidelines with a knee injury, going on to work with Alcoyano in directorial capacities.

Barila made his debut as a professional on 12 January 1997, featuring the full 90 minutes for Mérida in a 1–1 away against CD Leganés in the Segunda División. He scored his first and only goal in the competition exactly nine months later, helping hosts Levante beat Real Jaén 2–0.

== International career ==
Barila earned three caps for Equatorial Guinea, making his debut on 6 July 2003 against Morocco in the 2004 African Cup of Nations qualifiers and scoring his only goal on 11 October of that year in the 1–0 home win over Togo in the 2006 FIFA World Cup qualifying stage. He was the first Spanish-born player to be called up by the African national team.

== Personal life ==
After retiring, Barila became a FIFA agent, also holding a degree in law.
