= Isaac Boakye =

Ghanaian footballer (born 1981)

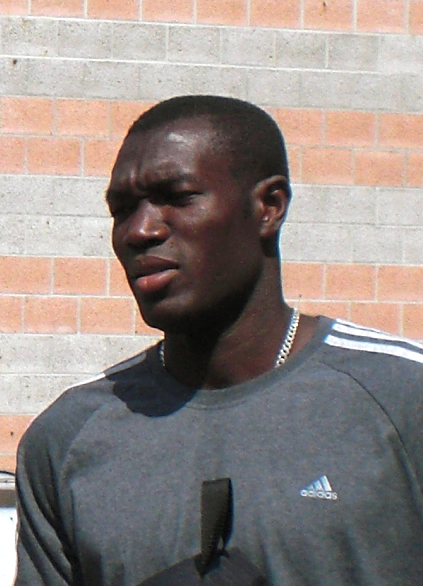
- Boakye on 26 July 2009

Personal information
- Date of birth: 26 November 1981 (age 44)
- Place of birth: Kumasi, Ashanti, Ghana
- Height: 1.80 m (5 ft 11 in)
- Position: Striker

Youth career
- 1999: Ghapoha Readers

Senior career*
Years	Team	Apps	(Gls)
2001–2002	Goldfields Obuasi	–	(10)
2002–2003	Asante Kotoko	–	(–)
2003–2006	Arminia Bielefeld	61	(24)
2006–2008	VfL Wolfsburg	26	(4)
2008	→ Mainz 05 (loan)	13	(1)
2008–2010	1. FC Nürnberg	43	(10)
2011–2013	Vålerenga	7	(1)
2013–2014	Asante Kotoko	5	(0)
Total		158+	(50+)

International career^{‡}
2001–2007	Ghana	17	(6)
- * Club domestic league appearances and goals as of 15 December 2013 ‡ National team caps and goals as of 24 December 2006

Isaac Boakye (born 26 November 1981) is a former professional footballer who played as striker for most of his career in Germany, Arminia Bielefeld, VfL Wolfsburg, 1. FSV Mainz 05 and 1. FC Nürnberg. In his native land, he featured for Goldfields Obuasi now Ashanti Gold and Asante Kotoko. He won the Ghana Premier League twice playing for Asante Kotoko. He won it in his first season in 2003 and his last playing season in 2014, which came about as a result making a return to the club after 10 years of playing abroad.

== Professional career ==
=== Goldfields Obuasi ===
Born in Kumasi, Boakye started his career at Ghapoha Readers, a club based in the Harbor City of Tema in Ghana. He later transferred to Goldfields Obuasi. In his first season with the Obuasi-based club, he scored 10 goals in the 2001–02 season. With that performance he attracted suitors from big clubs in both Ghana and overseas. In December 2001, he went on trials at Swedish Club Norrköping. He is mostly named amongst the talented youngsters to have plied their trade with the Obuasi club.

=== Asante Kotoko ===
After the trials with Norrköping, he joined African Club Asante Kotoko in early 2002, then went on trials at Turkish Club Ankaragücü. He won the Ghana Premier League and the GHALCA Cup in 2003 during his one-year stay with the club. During the GHALCA Cup final, he scored the first goal in the 4th minute to help Kotoko to a 2–0 victory over arch rivals Accra Hearts of Oak to win the cup. Stephen Oduro scored the other goal.

=== Arminia Bielefeld ===
With many of his compatriots scattered throughout Europe's top leagues and clubs, the then 22-year-old elected to sign for Arminia Bielefeld in the 2. Bundesliga and kept his eyes focused on the 2006 FIFA World Cup.

"My first year here in Germany has been nice," Boakye told in April 2004. “I’m very happy to start my career here, and I hope to get the chance to play in the Bundesliga soon. Bielefeld is doing well now, and the football is very competitive. That's good for me.”

The 1.80m tall forward has managed to score 14 times in his 26 clubs matches. His record for his country is slightly off that pace – five goals in his first 20 caps.

In March 2005, Boakye extended his contract with German side Arminia Bielefeld until June 2008. Persistent knee injuries limited Boakye to just four appearances that season but that did not prevent the club from offering him a new deal. Boakye scored 10 goals in his two seasons with Arminia Bielefeld in the Bundesliga. In his three-year stay with the club, he scored played 61 league matches and scored 24 goals.

=== Wolfsburg ===
In the summer of 2006, Isaac Boakye joined the German first division club Wolfsburg. The striker signed a three-year contract. In January 2008 he was loaned to 1. FSV Mainz 05, where he played 13 matches and scored 1 goal. He returned at the end of the season to Wolfsburg, but only for a short time, and transferred in August 2008.

=== 1. FC Nürnberg ===
Boakye secured a move to then 2. Bundesliga club 1. FC Nürnberg in August 2008. In debut season with the club, he played 31 league matches and scored 10 goals to push them into the Bundesliga after winning the play-offs round. He scored a brace in a 3–0 victory over Energie Cottbus in the first play-off game which aided their return to top flight. After two and a half years with Nürnberg with 43 league matches, 10 goals and 7 assists, the contract was terminated at his request in December 2010.

=== Vålerenga ===
On 4 April 2011, Boakye completed a free transfer move to Norwegian first division club Vålerenga Fotball. He signed a one-year contract after being without a club for almost four months. He was assigned the no. 18 jersey for the season. He made his debut on 8 April 2018, after coming on in the 61st minute of a 1–0 loss to Stabæk. His only goal for the club on 17 April 2011, after coming from the bench in the 56th minute to score an equalizer in the 81st minute to help earn a draw against Lillestrøm.

=== Return to Asante Kotoko ===
On 12 September 2013, Boakye signed for Asante Kotoko. In December 2014, he was registered and added to the squad list for their 2014 CAF Champions league campaign. In January 2014, during the club's mid-season break period, he was hailed by then coach, Dramani Mas-Ud Didi for his commitment whilst calling him an exceptionally player with a good character. He made his official debut on 3 February 2014, after starting in a 3–0 victory over lower-tier side First Klass FC in the MTN Ghana FA Cup. In the process, he scored his debut goal in the 63rd minute of the match. The following year, he was released by the club after winning the 2013–14 Ghanaian Premier League and the Ghanaian FA Cup.

== International career ==
When Ghana gave Boakye his first cap on 3 June 2001, he sent Zimbabwe into mourning by scoring an injury time winning goal to knock "the Warriors" out of qualification for 2002 African Cup of Nations in Mali. That late goal sent Zimbabwean sports commentator Charles Mabika crying for a long spell during live commentary on BBC Fast Track programme. This later became a subject of international discussion.

Zimbabweans had barely finished weeping when Boakye put George Weah temporarily into retirement after he scored the winner against Liberia in Monrovia. Boakye's goal in Monrovia gave the Black Stars a 2–1 win to dent Liberia's hopes of reaching the 2002 FIFA World Cup. Stones were thrown at Weah and his teammates after the match and the Liberia star, incensed by the behaviour of the fans, announced his retirement – a decision he rescinded a few days later.

He was part of the Ghanaian 2002 African Nations Cup team, who exited in the quarter-finals after losing to Nigeria, having finished second in Group B. Coming on as a substitute, he will be remembered for bringing his side back from the dead. Boakye came on as a second-half substitute to win the game with two goals in the last 60 seconds of the 2002 African Cup of Nations game against Burkina Faso.

A delighted Boakye, who wears shirt no.13, scored in the 89th and 90th minutes of the match to put Ghana into the quarter-finals. After the game, he declared: "I am happy too much and God has shown his mark today."

Boakye did his part to right Ghana's ship with two brilliant goals in the 5–0 demolition of Somalia in the first round of 2006 FIFA World Cup qualifying in Africa. The "Black Stars" won the tie easily 7–0 in Accra. Both matches were played in Ghana because of the security situation in Somalia.

=== World Cup agony ===
Ghana's World Cup preparations was in danger of falling apart as the countdown to tournament continued, after striker Isaac Boakye re-injured his troublesome right knee. Boakye sat out Arminia Bielefeld's final three games of the German season and as the injury was confirmed as a meniscus tear, he need surgery just before the Ghana World Cup team was announced.

== Injury concerns ==
Boakye was named in Ghana's 2004 Olympic Team but got injured in the Pre-Tournament training Camp in Faro, Portugal. That started a long costly battle with knee troubles that has seen him spend more time under the knife and on the sidelines than on the pitch. He has played only one International game for Ghana in the past three years.

Boakye missed all the major tournaments that Ghana played during that time including the 2004 Olympic Games, 2006 African Cup of Nations and the 2006 FIFA World Cup.

He was down on his luck when he recently joined the Wolves from Bundesliga rivals Arminia Bielefeld during the summer break. First of all, he contracted a virus while on holiday, and then he sustained a knee injury, which meant that he could only partially train at the training camp in Saalfelden, Austria. Boakye is happy at the way he has been welcomed to his new club, and he cannot wait to get started after he regains full fitness. Added Boakye who then said: “The most important thing is that I become healthy and fit, then my chance will come.”

On 28 February 2007, Ghana coach Claude Le Roy announced that Boakye will no longer play for the "Black Stars" for persistently turning down call-ups to the national team. Boakye has not featured in the Black Stars squad since September 2005 after falling out with previous coach Ratomir Dujkovic.

== Career statistics ==
=== Club ===
As of match played on 3 February 2014

Club	Season	Division	League		Cup^{1}		Continental^{2}		Other^{3}		Total		
Club	Season	Division	Apps	Goals	Apps	Goals	Apps	Goals	Apps	Goals	Apps	Goals	Assists
Goldfields Obuasi	2001–2003	Ghana Premier League	–	10	0	0	0	0	0	0	–	10	–
Asante Kotoko	2002–2003	Ghana Premier League	3	0	0	0	0	0	0	0	3	0	0
Arminia Bielefeld	2003–04	2. Bundesliga	26	14	0	0	0	0	0	0	26	14	3
Arminia Bielefeld	2004–05	Bundesliga	10	2	2	1	0	0	0	0	12	3	0
Arminia Bielefeld	2005–06	Bundesliga	25	8	4	1	0	0	0	0	29	9	3
VfL Wolfsburg	2006–07	Bundesliga	24	4	4	0	0	0	0	0	28	4	4
VfL Wolfsburg	2007–08	Bundesliga	2	0	0	0	0	0	0	0	2	0	0
Mainz 05 (loan)	2007–08	2. Bundesliga	13	1	0	0	0	0	0	0	13	1	1
1. FC Nürnberg	2008–09	2. Bundesliga	31	10	0	0	0	0	0	0	31	10	7
1. FC Nürnberg	2009–10	Bundesliga	10	0	0	0	0	0	0	0	10	0	0
1. FC Nürnberg	2010–11	Bundesliga	2	0	0	0	0	0	0	0	2	0	0
Vålerenga	2011–12	Tippeligaen	7	1	2	3	1	0	0	0	10	4	1
Asante Kotoko	2013–14	Ghana Premier League	5	0	1	1	0	0	0	0	6	1	0
Career total			158	50	13	6	1	0	0	0	167	56	19

^{1}Includes the Ghanaian FA Cup, Ghana Super Cup, Norwegian Football Cup, and the DFB-Pokal.
^{2}African competitions include the CAF Champions League, CAF Confederations Cup and the CAF Super Cup.
European competitions include the UEFA Champions League, UEFA Europa League and the UEFA Super Cup.
^{3}Other tournaments include the FIFA Club World Cup.

=== International ===
Appearances and goals by national team and year
National team	Year	Apps	Goals
Ghana	2001	7	2
Ghana	2002	5	2
Ghana	2003	3	2
Ghana	2005	2	0
Total		17	6

List of international goals scored by Isaac Boakye
No.	Date	Venue	Cap	Opponent	Score	Result	Competition	Ref.
1.	3 June 2001	National Sports Stadium, Harare, Zimbabwe	1	Zimbabwe	1–2	1–2	2002 African Cup of Nations - Group 6 qualifiers	
2.	1 July 2001	SKD Stadium, Paynesville, Liberia	3	Liberia	1–2	1–2	2002 World Cup qualifiers - Group B	
3.	30 January 2002	Stade Barema Bocoum, Mopti, Mali	9	Burkina Faso	1–1	1–2	2002 African Cup of Nations	
4.	30 January 2002	Stade Barema Bocoum, Mopti, Mali	9	Burkina Faso	1–2	1–2	2002 African Cup of Nations	
5.	16 November 2003	Accra Sports Stadium, Accra	14	Somalia	3–0	5–0	2006 World Cup qualifiers - Preliminary Round	
6.	16 November 2003	Accra Sports Stadium, Accra	14	Somalia	5–0	5–0	2006 World Cup qualifiers - Preliminary Round	

== Honours ==
Ghapoha Readers

- Ghanaian FA Cup: 1997

Asante Kotoko

- Ghana Premier League: 2003, 2013–14
- Ghanaian FA Cup: 2013–14
- GHALCA top 4: 2003
