= Isaac Tondo =

Liberian footballer

Personal information
- Full name: Isaac Tondo
- Date of birth: May 2, 1981 (age 45)
- Place of birth: Monrovia, Liberia
- Position: Striker

Team information
- Current team: LPRC Oilers

Senior career*
Years	Team	Apps	(Gls)
1999–2000	FC Kochin	-	(8)
2001	Saint Anthony		
2002	Saint Joseph Warriors		
2003–present	LPRC Oilers		

International career
2001–present	Liberia	11	(3)
- * Club domestic league appearances and goals as of 13:42, 18 December 2007 (UTC)

Isaac Tondo (born May 2, 1981 in Monrovia) is a Liberian football striker. He currently plays for LPRC Oilers.

Tondo is also a member of the Liberia national football team.
