= 2008 Africa Cup of Nations =

26th edition of the Africa Cup of Nations

- Africa Cup of Nations 2008 official logo

Tournament details
- Host country: Ghana
- Dates: 20 January – 10 February
- Teams: 16
- Venues: 4 (in 4 host cities)

Final positions
- Champions: Egypt (6th title)
- Runners-up: Cameroon
- Third place: Ghana
- Fourth place: Ivory Coast

Tournament statistics
- Matches played: 32
- Goals scored: 99 (3.09 per match)
- Attendance: 714,000 (22,313 per match)
- Top scorer: (Cameroon) Samuel Eto'o (5 goals)
- Best player: (Egypt) Hosny Abd Rabo
- Best goalkeeper: (Egypt) Essam El Hadary

The 2008 Africa Cup of Nations, also known as the MTN Africa Cup of Nations due to the competition's sponsorship by MTN, was the 26th edition of the Africa Cup of Nations, the biennial football tournament for nations affiliated with the Confederation of African Football (CAF). The tournament was staged at four venues around Ghana between 20 January and 10 February 2008. This was the last Africa Cup of Nations to use the old CAF logo.

Egypt won the tournament, beating Cameroon 1–0 in the final. As winners, they qualified for the 2009 FIFA Confederations Cup as the CAF representatives.

== Host selection ==
Bids:

- Ghana (selected as hosts)
- Libya
- South Africa (withdrew)

The organization of the 2008 Africa Cup of Nations was awarded to Ghana on 8 July 2004 by the CAF Executive Committee members which are 12 in Cairo, Egypt. Voters had a choice between Ghana and Libya which was disadvantaged by the fact that two countries in the North Africa region had already hosted the last two editions (Tunisia in 2004, and Egypt in 2006).

South Africa, also a candidate at the start, eventually withdrew in May 2004 after being nominated for the organization of the 2010 FIFA World Cup.

This was the fourth time that Ghana hosted the African Cup after 1963, 1978 and 2000 (jointly with Nigeria).

Results
Nation	Votes
Ghana	9
Libya	3
South Africa	Withdrew
Total votes	12

== Qualification ==
The entrants were divided into 12 groups. All group winners and the best three runners-up from groups with four teams (groups 2-11) qualified for the finals. Host Ghana qualified automatically. Qualifying took place between 2 September 2006 and 13 October 2007.

=== Teams ===
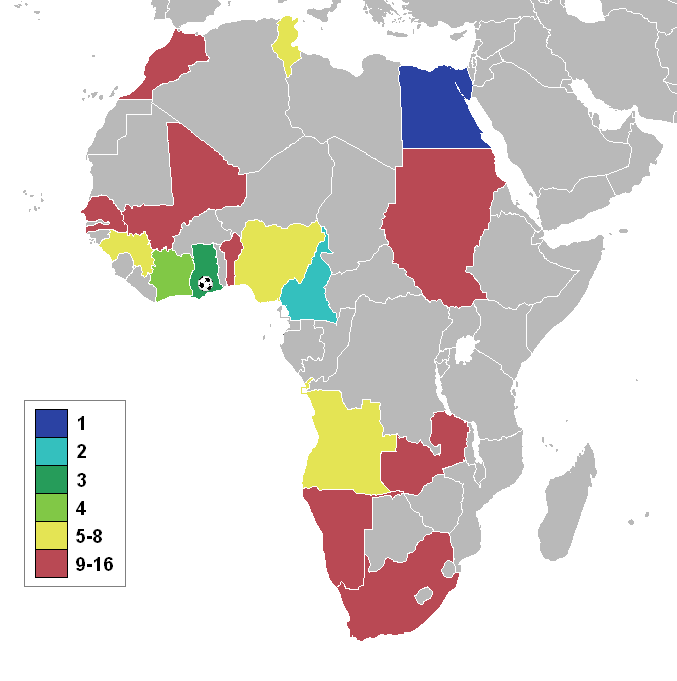
A map of Africa showing the qualified nations, highlighted by stage reached.

- Ghana – Host, 16th appearance (4 titles)
- Ivory Coast – Group 1 winner, 17th appearance (1 title)
- Egypt – Group 2 winner, 21st appearance (5 titles)
- Nigeria – Group 3 winner, 15th appearance (2 titles)
- Sudan – Group 4 winner, 7th appearance (1 title)
- Cameroon – Group 5 winner, 15th appearance (4 titles)
- Angola – Group 6 winner, 4th appearance
- Senegal – Group 7 winner, 11th appearance
- Guinea – Group 8 winner, 9th appearance
- Mali – Group 9 winner, 5th appearance
- Namibia – Group 10 winner, 2nd appearance
- Zambia – Group 11 winner, 13th appearance
- Morocco – Group 12 winner, 14th appearance (1 title)
- Tunisia – Group 4 runner-up, 13th appearance (1 title)
- Benin – Group 9 runner-up, 2nd appearance
- South Africa – Group 11 runner-up, 7th appearance (1 title)

== Venues ==
Accra	2008 Africa Cup of Nations is located in Ghana	Kumasi
Ohene Djan Stadium	2008 Africa Cup of Nations is located in Ghana	Baba Yara Stadium
Capacity: 40,000	2008 Africa Cup of Nations is located in Ghana	Capacity: 40,528
Tamale	2008 Africa Cup of Nations is located in Ghana	Sekondi-Takoradi
Tamale Stadium	2008 Africa Cup of Nations is located in Ghana	Sekondi-Takoradi Stadium
Capacity: 21,017	2008 Africa Cup of Nations is located in Ghana	Capacity: 20,088

== Tournament ball ==
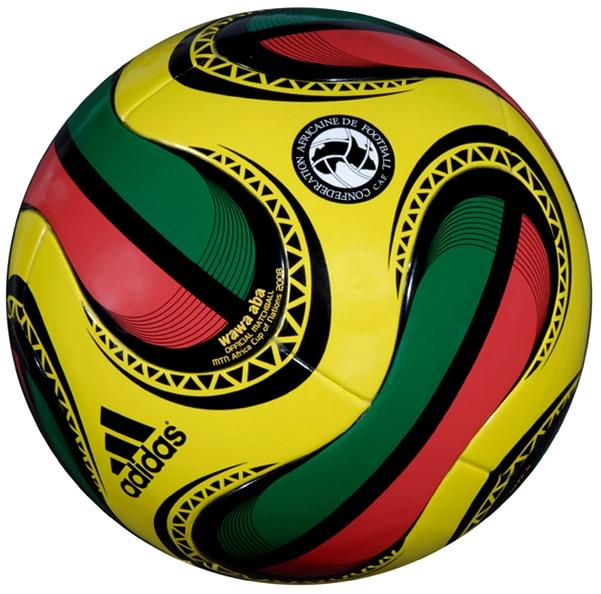
The tournament ball "Wawa Aba"

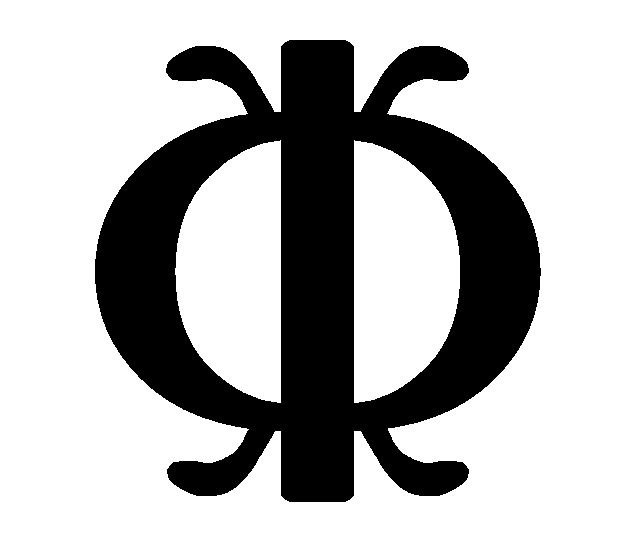
Wawa aba, an Adinkra symbol of hardiness, toughness, and perseverance

During the previous editions of the Africa Cup of Nations, the ball used was not a ball especially made for the tournament. As the tournament was held on even years, the same years big tournaments such as the UEFA European Championships or the FIFA World Cup were held, the official ball for the tournament held this year was used for the African Cup of Nations: the Adidas Roteiro in 2004, or the Adidas Teamgeist in 2006. However, for the 2008 tournament, Adidas made a special ball, clearly different from the Adidas Europass going to be used five months later for UEFA Euro 2008. The ball was named Wawa Aba and was designed to include host nation Ghana's red, yellow and green. The ball was later used for the other African competitions.

For the Akan culture originating from Western Africa, one of the Adinkra symbols named Wawa Aba is a symbol of hardiness, toughness, and perseverance. People there particularly believe in the strength and team spirit of a community. The Wawa Aba literally means "seed(s) of Wawa tree (Triplochiton scleroxylon)”, one of the strongest and most processible woods of Africa and whose seeds are very hard. For the population, the Wawa Aba mainly has mystical significance. These are people who don't let failure discourage them, who seize all opportunities successfully and who are thus just as strong and adaptable as the Wawa Aba.

== Match officials ==
16 referees and 16 assistant referees were selected for the tournament, including two from Japan and one from South Korea.

Referees	Assistant Referees
(Algeria) Mohamed Benouza	(Algeria) Brahim Djezzar
(Cameroon) Divine Evehe	(Cameroon) Evarist Menkouande
(Japan) Yuichi Nishimura	(Japan) Toru Sagara
(Morocco) Abderrahim El Arjoun	(Morocco) Redouane Achik
(South Africa) Jerome Damon	(South Africa) Enock Molefe
(Togo) Kokou Djaoupe	(Togo) Komi Konyoh
(Tunisia) Kacem Bennaceur	(Tunisia) Bechir Hassani
(Algeria) Djamel Haimoudi	(South Korea) Jeong Hae-sang
(Benin) Coffi Codjia	(Rwanda) Celestin Ntagungira
(The Gambia) Modou Sowe	(Eritrea) Angesom Ogbamariam
(Ghana) Alex Kotey	(Burundi) Desire Gahungu
(Mali) Koman Coulibaly	(Burkina Faso) Lassina Paré
(Senegal) Badara Diatta	(Nigeria) Peter Edibe
(Seychelles) Eddy Maillet	(Angola) Inácio Manuel Cândido
(Uganda) Muhmed Ssegonga	(Egypt) Nasser Sadek Abdel Nabi
(Zimbabwe) Kenias Marange	(Zambia) Kenneth Chichenga

== Draw ==
The draw for the tournament took place on 19 October 2007 in Accra. The sixteen teams were divided into four pots according to their performances in past Cup of Nations tournaments. Ghana, as hosts, were automatically seeded as the top team in Group A. Egypt, the defending champions, were seeded as the top team in Group C. Tunisia and Nigeria had the two strongest records and so completed the top seeded Pot 1. Each group consists of four teams, one drawn from each of the pots.

Pot 1	Pot 2	Pot 3	Pot 4
Ghana (hosts); Egypt (title holders); Tunisia; Nigeria	Ivory Coast; Cameroon; Morocco; Senegal	South Africa; Guinea; Mali; Zambia	Angola; Benin; Namibia; Sudan

== Group stage ==
=== Tie-breaking criteria ===
Where two or more teams end the group stage with the same number of points, their ranking is determined by the following criteria:

1. points earned in the matches between the teams concerned;
2. goal difference in the matches between the teams concerned;
3. number of goals scored in the group matches between the teams concerned;
4. goal difference in all group matches;
5. number of goals scored in all group matches;
6. drawing of lots by the organizing committee.

All times given as local time (UTC+0)

=== Group A ===
Pos	Team	Pld	W	D	L	GF	GA	GD	Pts	Qualification
1	Ghana (H)	3	3	0	0	5	1	+4	9	Advance to knockout stage
2	Guinea	3	1	1	1	5	5	0	4	Advance to knockout stage
3	Morocco	3	1	0	2	7	6	+1	3	
4	Namibia	3	0	1	2	2	7	−5	1	

Source: CAF
(H) Hosts
20 January 2008
17:00

Ghana	2–1	Guinea
A. Gyan 55' (pen.); Muntari 90'	Report	Kalabane 65'

Ohene Djan Stadium, Accra
Attendance: 35,000
Referee: Eddy Maillet (Seychelles)
21 January 2008
15:00

Namibia	1–5	Morocco
Brendell 24'	Report	Alloudi 1', 5', 28'; Sektioui 40' (pen.); Zerka 74'

Ohene Djan Stadium, Accra
Attendance: 2,000
Referee: Divine Evehe (Cameroon)

24 January 2008
17:00

Guinea	3–2	Morocco
Feindouno 11', 63' (pen.); Bangoura 59'	Report	Aboucherouane 60'; Ouaddou 90'

Ohene Djan Stadium, Accra
Attendance: 15,000
Referee: Jerome Damon (South Africa)
24 January 2008
19:30

Ghana	1–0	Namibia
Agogo 41'	Report

Ohene Djan Stadium, Accra
Attendance: 40,000
Referee: Kacem Bennaceur (Tunisia)

28 January 2008
17:00

Ghana	2–0	Morocco
Essien 26'; Muntari 45'	Report

Ohene Djan Stadium, Accra
Attendance: 40,000
Referee: Modou Sowe (Gambia)
28 January 2008
17:00

Guinea	1–1	Namibia
Youla 62'	Report	Brendell 80'

Sekondi-Takoradi Stadium, Sekondi-Takoradi
Attendance: 1,000
Referee: Muhmed Ssegonga (Uganda)

=== Group B ===
Pos	Team	Pld	W	D	L	GF	GA	GD	Pts	Qualification
1	Ivory Coast	3	3	0	0	8	1	+7	9	Advance to knockout stage
2	Nigeria	3	1	1	1	2	1	+1	4	Advance to knockout stage
3	Mali	3	1	1	1	1	3	−2	4	
4	Benin	3	0	0	3	1	7	−6	0	

Source: CAF
21 January 2008
17:00

Nigeria	0–1	Ivory Coast
	Report	Kalou 66'

Sekondi Stadium, Sekondi-Takoradi
Attendance: 20,088
Referee: Mohamed Benouza (Algeria)
21 January 2008
19:45

Mali	1–0	Benin
Kanouté 49' (pen.)	Report

Sekondi Stadium, Sekondi-Takoradi
Attendance: 11,000
Referee: Jerome Damon (South Africa)

25 January 2008
17:00

Ivory Coast	4–1	Benin
Drogba 40'; Y. Touré 44'; Keïta 53'; Dindane 63'	Report	Omotoyossi 90'

Sekondi Stadium, Sekondi-Takoradi
Attendance: 13,000
Referee: Kenias Marange (Zimbabwe)
25 January 2008
19:30

Nigeria	0–0	Mali
	Report

Sekondi Stadium, Sekondi-Takoradi
Attendance: 16,000
Referee: Abderrahim El Arjoun (Morocco)

29 January 2008
17:00

Nigeria	2–0	Benin
Mikel 53'; Yakubu 86'	Report

Sekondi Stadium, Sekondi-Takoradi
Attendance: 4,000
Referee: Kacem Bennaceur (Tunisia)
29 January 2008
17:00

Ivory Coast	3–0	Mali
Drogba 9'; Zoro 54'; Sanogo 86'	Report

Ohene Djan Stadium, Accra
Attendance: 20,000
Referee: Eddy Maillet (Seychelles)

=== Group C ===
Pos	Team	Pld	W	D	L	GF	GA	GD	Pts	Qualification
1	Egypt	3	2	1	0	8	3	+5	7	Advance to knockout stage
2	Cameroon	3	2	0	1	10	5	+5	6	Advance to knockout stage
3	Zambia	3	1	1	1	5	6	−1	4	
4	Sudan	3	0	0	3	0	9	−9	0	

Source: CAF
22 January 2008
17:00

Egypt	4–2	Cameroon
Hosny 14' (pen.), 82'; Zidan 17', 45'	Report	Eto'o 51', 90' (pen.)

Baba Yara Stadium, Kumasi
Attendance: 42,000
Referee: Modou Sowe (Gambia)
22 January 2008
19:30

Sudan	0–3	Zambia
	Report	Chamanga 2'; J. Mulenga 50'; F. Katongo 59'

Baba Yara Stadium, Kumasi
Attendance: 35,000
Referee: Badara Diatta (Senegal)

26 January 2008
17:00

Cameroon	5–1	Zambia
Geremi 28'; Job 32', 82'; Emana 44'; Eto'o 66' (pen.)	Report	C. Katongo 90'

Baba Yara Stadium, Kumasi
Attendance: 10,000
Referee: Yuichi Nishimura (Japan)
26 January 2008
19:30

Egypt	3–0	Sudan
Hosny 29' (pen.); Aboutrika 78', 83'	Report

Baba Yara Stadium, Kumasi
Attendance: 15,000
Referee: Coffi Codjia (Benin)

30 January 2008
17:00

Cameroon	3–0	Sudan
Eto'o 27' (pen.), 90'; El Khider 33' (o.g.)	Report

Tamale Stadium, Tamale
Attendance: 10,000
Referee: Kokou Djaoupe (Togo)
30 January 2008
17:00

Egypt	1–1	Zambia
Zaki 15'	Report	C. Katongo 88'

Baba Yara Stadium, Kumasi
Attendance: 2,000
Referee: Koman Coulibaly (Mali)

=== Group D ===
Pos	Team	Pld	W	D	L	GF	GA	GD	Pts	Qualification
1	Tunisia	3	1	2	0	5	3	+2	5	Advance to knockout stage
2	Angola	3	1	2	0	4	2	+2	5	Advance to knockout stage
3	Senegal	3	0	2	1	4	6	−2	2	
4	South Africa	3	0	2	1	3	5	−2	2	

Source: CAF
23 January 2008
17:00

Tunisia	2–2	Senegal
Jemâa 9'; Traoui 82'	Report	Sall 45'; D. Kamara 66'

Tamale Stadium, Tamale
Attendance: 12,000
Referee: Yuichi Nishimura (Japan)
23 January 2008
19:30

South Africa	1–1	Angola
Van Heerden 87'	Report	Manucho 29'

Tamale Stadium, Tamale
Attendance: 15,000
Referee: Koman Coulibaly (Mali)

27 January 2008
17:00

Senegal	1–3	Angola
A. Faye 20'	Report	Manucho 50', 67'; Flávio 78'

Tamale Stadium, Tamale
Attendance: 10,000
Referee: Modou Sowe (Gambia)
27 January 2008
19:30

Tunisia	3–1	South Africa
Santos 8', 34'; Ben Saada 32'	Report	Mphela 87'

Tamale Stadium, Tamale
Attendance: 15,000
Referee: Kokou Djaoupe (Togo)

31 January 2008
17:00

Senegal	1–1	South Africa
H. Camara 36'	Report	Van Heerden 14'

Baba Yara Stadium, Kumasi
Attendance: 15,000
Referee: Alex Kotey (Ghana)
31 January 2008
17:00

Tunisia	0–0	Angola
	Report

Tamale Stadium, Tamale
Attendance: 10,000
Referee: Coffi Codjia (Benin)

== Knockout stage ==
Quarter-finals
3 February – Accra
Ghana	2
Nigeria	1
4 February – Tamale
Tunisia	2
Cameroon (a.e.t.)	3
3 February – Sekondi
Ivory Coast	5
Guinea	0
4 February – Kumasi
Egypt	2
Angola	1

Semi-finals
7 February – Accra
Ghana	0
Cameroon	1
7 February – Kumasi
Ivory Coast	1
Egypt	4

Final
10 February – Accra
Cameroon	0
Egypt	1
Third place
9 February – Kumasi
Ghana	4
Ivory Coast	2

=== Quarter-finals ===
3 February 2008
17:00

Ghana	2–1	Nigeria
Essien 45+2'; Agogo 83'	Report	Yakubu 35' (pen.)

Ohene Djan Stadium, Accra
Attendance: 45,000
Referee: Mohamed Benouza (Algeria)

3 February 2008
20:30

Ivory Coast	5–0	Guinea
Keïta 25'; Drogba 70'; Kalou 72', 81'; B. Koné 85'	Report

Sekondi Stadium, Sekondi
Attendance: 14,000
Referee: Djamel Haimoudi (Algeria)

4 February 2008
17:00

Egypt	2–1	Angola
Hosny 23' (pen.); Zaki 38'	Report	Manucho 27'

Baba Yara Stadium, Kumasi
Attendance: 6,000
Referee: Yuichi Nishimura (Japan)

4 February 2008
20:30

Tunisia	2–3 (a.e.t.)	Cameroon
Ben Saada 34'; Chikhaoui 81'	Report	Mbia 18', 93'; Geremi 27'

Tamale Stadium, Tamale
Attendance: 15,000
Referee: Koman Coulibaly (Mali)

=== Semi-finals ===
7 February 2008
17:00

Ghana	0–1	Cameroon
	Report	N'Kong 72'

Ohene Djan Stadium, Accra
Attendance: 40,000
Referee: Abderahim El Arjoune (Morocco)

7 February 2008
20:30

Ivory Coast	1–4	Egypt
Keita 63'	Report	Fathy 12'; Zaki 61', 67'; Aboutrika 90+1'

Baba Yara Stadium, Kumasi
Attendance: 30,000
Referee: Eddy Maillet (Seychelles)

=== Third place match ===
9 February 2008
17:00

Ghana	4–2	Ivory Coast
Muntari 10'; Owusu-Abeyie 70'; Agogo 80'; Draman 84'	Report	Sanogo 24', 32'

Baba Yara Stadium, Kumasi
Attendance: 40,000
Referee: Jerome Damon (South Africa)

=== Final ===
10 February 2008
17:00

Cameroon	0–1	Egypt
		Aboutrika 76'

Ohene Djan Stadium, Accra
Attendance: 35,500
Referee: Coffi Codjia (Benin)

== Awards ==
=== Player of the tournament ===
- (Egypt) Hosny Abd Rabo

=== Top scorer ===
- (Cameroon) Samuel Eto'o – 5 goals

=== Best Goalkeeper ===
- (Egypt) Essam El Hadary

=== Best XI ===
The following players were selected as the best in their respective positions, based on their performances throughout the tournament. Their performances were analysed by the tournament's Technical Study Group (TSG), who picked the team.

Goalkeepers	Defenders	Midfielders	Forwards
(Egypt) Essam El Hadary	(Cameroon) Geremi (Egypt) Wael Gomaa (Ghana) Michael Essien	(Ghana) Sulley Muntari (Ivory Coast) Yaya Touré (Cameroon) Alex Song (Egypt) Hosny Abd Rabo (Egypt) Mohamed Aboutrika	(Egypt) Amr Zaki (Angola) Manucho

Substitutes

- (Ghana) Richard Kingson
- (Egypt) Hany Said
- (Egypt) Ahmed Fathy
- (Tunisia) Saber Ben Frej
- (Cameroon) Stéphane Mbia
- (Cameroon) Samuel Eto'o
- (Ivory Coast) Didier Drogba
- (Ivory Coast) Kader Keïta

== Goalscorers ==
There were 99 goals scored in 32 matches, for an average of 3.09 goals per match.

5 goals

- (Cameroon) Samuel Eto'o

4 goals

- (Angola) Manucho
- (Egypt) Hosny Abd Rabo
- (Egypt) Mohamed Aboutrika
- (Egypt) Amr Zaki

3 goals

- (Ivory Coast) Didier Drogba
- (Ivory Coast) Salomon Kalou
- (Ivory Coast) Kader Keïta
- (Ivory Coast) Boubacar Sanogo
- (Ghana) Junior Agogo
- (Ghana) Sulley Muntari
- (Morocco) Soufiane Alloudi

2 goals

- (Cameroon) Geremi
- (Cameroon) Joseph-Désiré Job
- (Cameroon) Stéphane Mbia
- (Egypt) Mohamed Zidan
- (Ghana) Michael Essien
- (Guinea) Pascal Feindouno
- (Namibia) Brian Brendell
- (Nigeria) Yakubu
- (South Africa) Elrio van Heerden
- (Tunisia) Chaouki Ben Saada
- (Tunisia) Francileudo dos Santos
- (Zambia) Chris Katongo

1 goal

- (Angola) Flávio
- (Benin) Razak Omotoyossi
- (Cameroon) Achille Emana
- (Cameroon) Alain N'Kong
- (Ivory Coast) Aruna Dindane
- (Ivory Coast) Bakari Koné
- (Ivory Coast) Yaya Touré
- (Ivory Coast) Marco Zoro
- (Egypt) Ahmed Fathy
- (Ghana) Haminu Dramani
- (Ghana) Asamoah Gyan
- (Ghana) Quincy Owusu-Abeyie
- (Guinea) Ismaël Bangoura
- (Guinea) Oumar Kalabane
- (Guinea) Souleymane Youla
- (Mali) Frédéric Kanouté
- (Morocco) Hicham Aboucherouane
- (Morocco) Abdeslam Ouaddou
- (Morocco) Tarik Sektioui
- (Morocco) Monsef Zerka
- (Nigeria) Mikel John Obi
- (Senegal) Moustapha Bayal Sall
- (Senegal) Henri Camara
- (Senegal) Abdoulaye Diagne-Faye
- (Senegal) Diomansy Kamara
- (South Africa) Katlego Mphela
- (Tunisia) Yassine Chikhaoui
- (Tunisia) Issam Jemâa
- (Tunisia) Mejdi Traoui
- (Zambia) James Chamanga
- (Zambia) Felix Katongo
- (Zambia) Jacob Mulenga

1 own goal

- (Sudan) Mohammed Ali El Khider (against Cameroon)

=== Tournament rankings ===
Ranking criteria
For teams eliminated in the same knockout round, the following criteria are applied, in the order given, to determine the final rankings:
1. Goal difference in round eliminated;
2. Goals scored in round eliminated;
3. If teams eliminated in the semi-finals or quarter-finals are tied, the above criteria are reapplied for the previous knockout round, with this process repeated once more should two semi-finalists remain tied;
4. Points in group stage;
5. Goal difference in group stage;
6. Goals scored in group stage;
7. Disciplinary points.

For teams eliminated in the group stage, the following criteria are applied, in the order given, to determine the final rankings:

1. Position in group;
2. Points;
3. Goal difference;
4. Goals scored;
5. Disciplinary points.

Pos.	Team	G	Pld	W	D	L	Pts	GF	GA	GD
1	Egypt	D	6	5	1	0	16	15	5	+10
2	Cameroon	B	6	4	0	2	12	14	8	+6
3	Ghana	A	6	5	0	1	15	11	5	+6
4	Ivory Coast	C	6	4	0	2	12	16	9	+7
Eliminated in the quarter-finals
5	Tunisia	B	4	1	2	1	5	7	6	+1
6	Angola	C	4	1	2	1	5	5	4	+1
7	Nigeria	A	4	1	1	2	4	3	3	0
8	Guinea	D	4	1	1	2	4	5	10	−5
Eliminated in the group stage
9	Zambia	A	3	1	1	1	4	5	6	−1
10	Mali	D	3	1	1	1	4	1	3	−2
11	Morocco	B	3	1	0	2	3	7	6	+1
12	Senegal	C	3	0	2	1	2	4	6	−2
13	South Africa	D	3	0	2	1	2	3	5	−2
14	Namibia	B	3	0	1	2	1	2	7	−5
15	Benin	A	3	0	0	3	0	1	7	−6
16	Sudan	C	3	0	0	3	0	0	9	−9
