= Modou Sowe =

Gambian football referee (born 1963)

Modou Sowe (born November 25, 1963) is a Gambian football referee who currently resides in Gambia. He first became a full international referee for FIFA in 1998.

He was selected as a referee for the 2004 African Cup of Nations in Tunisia, the 2006 African Cup of Nations in Egypt, and the 2008 Africa Cup of Nations in Ghana, and officiated in qualifying matches for the 2002 and 2006 World Cups.

Sowe was named as a candidate referee for the 2006 FIFA World Cup, but was not selected for the tournament.

== See also ==
- List of football referees
