= Cyril Mourgine =

Mauritian footballer (born 1975)

Personal information
- Date of birth: 14 March 1975 (age 51)
- Place of birth: Mauritius
- Position: Defender

Senior career*
Years	Team	Apps	(Gls)
?–2000	Fire Brigade SC	?	(?)
2000–2001	Olympique Moka	?	(?)
2001–2008	AS Port-Louis 2000	?	(?)
2008–2010	Pamplemousses SC	?	(?)

International career
2001–2007	Mauritius	33	(3)
- * Club domestic league appearances and goals

Cyril Mourgine (born 14 March 1975) is a Mauritian former international footballer who played as a defender. He won 33 caps and scored 3 goals for the Mauritius national team between 2001 and 2007.
