= Sekondi-Takoradi Stadium =

Sports venue in Sekondi-Takoradi, Ghana

Coordinates: 4.976898°N 1.681799°W

Sekondi Sports Stadium
- Sekondi-Takoradi Stadium at night
- Interactive map of Sekondi Sports Stadium
- Location: Sekondi-Takoradi, Western Region, Ghana
- Owner: NSC/RCC Western Region, Ghana
- Capacity: 20,000

Construction
- Opened: 2008

Tenant
- Sekondi Hasaacas FC

The Sekondi Sports Stadium (also known as Essipong Stadium) is a multi-purpose stadium in Sekondi-Takoradi, Ghana. It is used mostly for football matches and serves as the home stadium of Sekondi Hasaacas FC. Sekondi-Takoradi Stadium hosted some matches during 2008 African Cup of Nations. The stadium has a capacity of 20,000 people and opened in 2008. The stadium looks similar to the Tamale Sports Stadium also known as the Aliu Mahama Sports Stadium.

== Gallery ==
Aliu Mahama Sports Stadium

Exterior view of the Sekondi-Takoradi Stadium

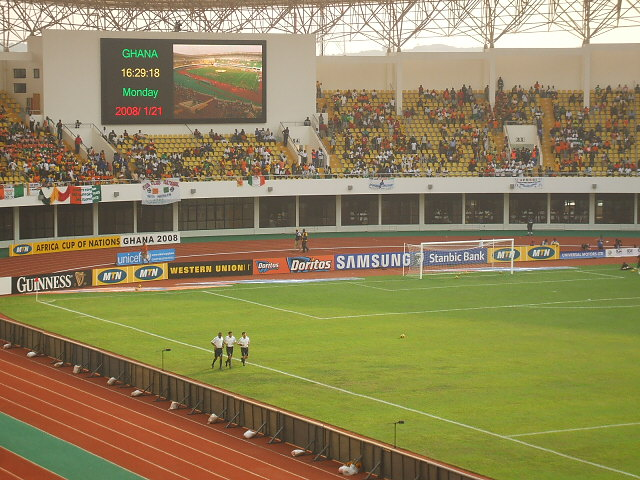
Interior view of the Sekondi-Takoradi Stadium in 2008
