= Mohamed Assani =

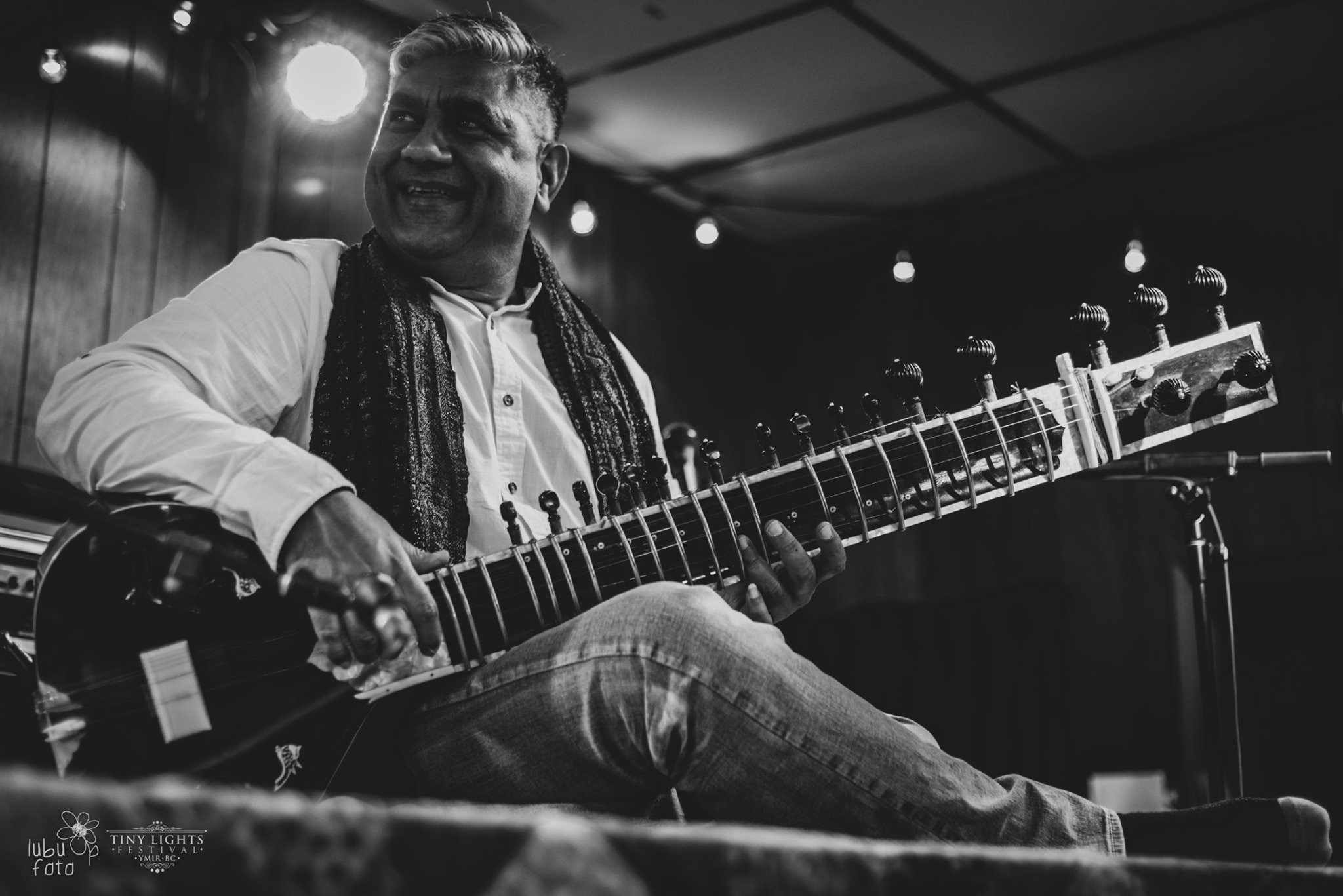
- Mohamed Assani performing live

Background information
- Born: Karachi, Pakistan
- Genres: Raga; Jazz; World Music; Hindustani Classical Music
- Occupations: Musician, Composer, Teacher
- Instrument: Sitar

Mohamed Assani is a Vancouver based sitar player and composer. He has composed for orchestra alongside John Oliver and performed for heads of state and royalty including the Al Maktoum, Aga Khan IV, the Governor General of Canada and Amyn Aga Khan. The Georgia Straight wrote, "Assani is both a musician who’s deeply rooted in the artistic traditions of South Asia and a one-of-a-kind innovator."

== Career ==
Assani studied at Dartington College of Arts (now Falmouth University) in England. He later learned sitar as a senior disciple of Ustad Ashraf Sharif Khan, son of Sharif Khan Poonchwaley of the Poonch Gharana. Mohamed Assani has been noted for his collaborations, seeing fusions of sitar music with hip hop performers and DJ's as well as with jazz and world music ensembles. These collaborations include a range of artists such as: Bramwell Tovey, DJ Drez, Hossein Behroozinia and the Black Dyke Band.

He has performed at festivals including the Coastal Jazz Festival, the Wanderlust Festival and MusicFest Canada both as a solo musician and as a part of a larger ensemble.

In November 2017 he composed a concerto for sitar and orchestra for the Vancouver Symphony Orchestra with composer John Oliver. The composition was called a “spectacular success... a triumph” by Musicworks. This came after similar successes including a collaborative piece written for His Highness Aga Khan IV and a commission to curate the music for Coleman Barks appearance the Indian Summer Festival.

In 2011, Mohamed released a classical sitar album, called Spirit of Tradition, which according to the Georgia Straight newspaper, "is a joy from start to finish." In April 2020, he released a solo album of his own original music called Wayfinder. It was produced by Emmy & Juno-nominated music producer Adham Shaikh. Jazz Views says of this album, "This music is nothing short of bewitching. It surprises, delights and leaves the listener lifted, overwhelmed yet strangely calm." He was interviewed regarding his Wayfinder solo album in Rungh Magazine.

Mohamed Assani is also notable as an educator. He has in the past taught at the University of Huddersfield, Royal Academy of Arts, as well as the BRIT School.

== Solo discography ==
- Spirit Of Tradition (2011)
- Wayfinder (2020)
