= George Mbwando =

Zimbabwean footballer (born 1975)

Personal information
- Full name: George Stanley Mbwando
- Date of birth: 20 October 1975 (age 51)
- Height: 1.88 m (6 ft 2 in)
- Positions: Centre-back; defensive midfielder

Youth career
- –1996: Blackpool FC Harare

Senior career*
Years	Team	Apps	(Gls)
1996–1997	Lech Poznań	10	(0)
1997	Jumbo Giants		
1998	Bonner SC	7	(0)
1998–1999	VfB Oldenburg	38	(7)
2000–2002	VfB Lübeck	68	(15)
2002–2004	Alemannia Aachen	55	(4)
2004–2006	Jahn Regensburg	41	(2)
2006–2008	FC Ingolstadt	8	(0)
2008–2009	TSV Kösching		
2009–2013	VfB Friedrichshofen		
2013–2015	FC Böhmfeld		
2016	FC Fatih Spor Ingolstadt	1	(0)
2017–2018	SpVgg Hofstetten	2	(0)

International career
	Zimbabwe	11	(0)
- * Club domestic league appearances and goals

George Stanley Mbwando (born 20 October 1975) is a Zimbabwean former professional footballer who played as a centre-back or defensive midfielder.

== Career ==
In the 2003–04 season, Mbwando reached the DFB-Pokal final with Alemannia Aachen. He was sent off for a tackle in the 75th minute with opponents Werder Bremen leading 2–1. Werder Bremen went on to win 3–2.

He was a member of the Zimbabwe national team at the 2004 African Cup of Nations, which finished bottom of its group in the first round of competition, thus failing to secure qualification for the quarter-finals. He also participated at the 2006 Africa Cup of Nations, with the same outcome.

== Honours ==
Alemannia Aachen

- DFB-Pokal: runner-up 2003–04
