= Lawrence Adjah-Tetteh =

Ghanaian footballer

Nii Adjah-Tetteh
Personal information
- Full name: Lawrence Nii Adjah-Tetteh
- Place of birth: Accra, Ghana
- Position: Attacking midfielder

Team information
- Current team: Pure Joy FC
- Number: 25

Senior career*
Years	Team	Apps	(Gls)
	Hearts of Oak	67	(0)

International career
2001	Ghana	4	(0)
- * Club domestic league appearances and goals

Lawrence Nii Adjah Tetteh (born 22 September 1979, in Accra) is a Ghanaian footballer.

== Club career ==
Lawrence Adjah Tetteh was born and raised in Accra. He however began his professional football at the Ghana Premier League Club Dawu Youngsters. Adjah-Tetteh was at Dawu for more than 4 years and eventually became captain of the side. At the end of 1999 when Dawu had been relegated from the Ghana Premier League he became available. Accra Hearts of Oak who at that time were Champions of the Ghana Premier League preparing for another attempt at CAF Champions League glory signed him for an undisclosed fee.

At that time during the transfer Window, archrivals of Accra Hearts of Oak, Kumasi Asante Kotoko had embarked on a major spending spree signing several players including Stephen Oduro from Obuasi Goldfileds FC, Michael "Mark Fish" Donkor from Ghapoha, and Michael "Ember" Osei from Cape-Coast Ebusua Dwarfs. The signing of Adjah Tetteh by Accra Hearts of Oak hence did not grab the headlines of the local tabloids until mid season when he solidified his place in the team. Adjah-Tetteh ended up with a lucrative trophy haul eventually, winning the Ghana PL 3 times, the FA cup twice, the CAF Champions League cup and the African Conferderations cup

== International career ==
Tetteh is also a member of the Black Stars and holds five games.
