= Léopards de Transfoot =

Malagasy football club

Leopards Transfoot
- Full name: Léopards de Transfoot
- Ground: Barikadimy Stadium; Toamasina, Madagascar
- Capacity: 20,000
- League: THB Champions League

Léopards de Transfoot is a football club based in Madagascar, playing in the Malagasy Second Division.

In 2003, the team won the Coupe de Madagascar. The team plays at the Barikadimy Stadium.

== Achievements ==
- Coupe de Madagascar: 2003

== Performance in CAF competitions ==
- 2004 CAF Confederation Cup: 1 appearance

== Notable players ==
- Jimmy Radafison
- Mazinot Valentin
