= Andrew Osei-Bonsu =

English footballer

Personal information
- Full name: Andrew Kwadjo Osei-Bonsu
- Date of birth: 4 January 1999 (age 27)
- Place of birth: Milton Keynes, England
- Height: 1.83 m (6 ft 0 in)
- Position: Midfielder

Team information
- Current team: Northwood

Youth career
- 2007–2017: Milton Keynes Dons

Senior career*
Years	Team	Apps	(Gls)
2016–2017	Milton Keynes Dons	0	(0)
2017	→ Corby Town (loan)	1	(0)
2017	Wealdstone	1	(0)
2017–2018	Dunstable Town	38	(5)
2018	Larne	6	(0)
2019	St Ives Town	27	(3)
2019–2020	Billericay Town	3	(0)
2021	East Fife	9	(0)
2022	St Ives Town	9	(0)
2022–2023	Royston Town	2	(0)
2023	Yaxley	2	(0)
2023	Kempston Rovers	4	(0)
2023	Daventry Town		
2023–2024	Dunstable Town	22	(0)
2024–2026	Arlesey Town	61	(0)
2026–	Northwood	13	(0)
- * Club domestic league appearances and goals as of 12:20, 17 May 2026 (UTC)

Andrew Kwadjo Osei-Bonsu (born 4 January 1999) is an English professional footballer who plays as a midfielder for Northwood. He was previously an academy scholar of Milton Keynes Dons, and featured for the club's first team in the EFL Cup and EFL Trophy.

== Club career ==
=== Milton Keynes Dons ===
Osei-Bonsu joined Milton Keynes Dons' academy at a young age, progressing through various age groups and into the club's development squad. On 9 August 2016, Osei-Bonsu made his professional debut for the first team, playing the full 90 minutes in a 2–3 EFL Cup first round away win against Newport County. At the end of the 2016–17 season, he was one of several academy scholars released by the club.

=== Larne ===
Following brief spells with Wealdstone, Dunstable Town, and trials with Derby County and Huddersfield Town, Osei-Bonsu joined Irish NIFL Championship club Larne on 8 June 2018. Following limited first team opportunities due to injury, he left the club by mutual consent in December 2018 having made six appearances.

=== St Ives Town ===
On 15 January 2019, Osei-Bonsu joined St Ives Town. He left the club on 13 September 2019 due to limited playing time in the 2019-20 after the arrival of a new forward.

=== Billericay Town ===
On 14 November 2019, Billericay Town announced the arrival of Osei-Bonsu.

=== East Fife ===
In August 2021, Osei-Bonsu signed for Scottish League One side East Fife. In December 2021, Osei-Bonsu was released from his contract.

=== St Ives Town (second spell) ===
On 4 March 2022, Osei-Bonsu once again signed for Southern League side St Ives Town.

=== Royston Town ===
In October 2022, Osei-Bonsu signed for Royston Town.

=== Yaxley ===
By January 2023 he was playing for Yaxley, scoring on his debut for the club.

=== Daventry Town ===
In June 2023, Osei-Bonsu joins Daventry Town.

=== Other moves ===
Since then Osei-Bonsu has had spells with Dunstable Town and Arlesey Town. Then, in February 2026, Osei-Bonsu followed Arlesey manager Tommy Cooney to Southern League Division One Central side Northwood, and was installed as captain.

== Personal life ==
Osei-Bonsu is of Ghanaian descent.

== Career statistics ==
As of 23 January 2019

Club	Season	League			FA Cup		League Cup		Other		Total	
Club	Season	Division	Apps	Goals	Apps	Goals	Apps	Goals	Apps	Goals	Apps	Goals
Milton Keynes Dons	2016–17	League One	0	0	0	0	1	0	1 (Note: Appearance in 2016–17 EFL Trophy.)	0	2	0
Wealdstone	2017–18	National League North	1	0	0	0	—		—		1	0
Dunstable Town	2017–18	Southern Premier	36	5	0	0	—		2	0	38	5
Larne	2018–19	NIFL Championship	6	0	0	0	—		—		6	0
St Ives Town	2018–19	Southern Premier Central	2	1	—		—		—		2	1
Career total			14	5	0	0	1	0	1	0	16	5
