= Alain Rakotondramanana =

Malagasy footballer

Personal information
- Date of birth: 16 April 1970 (age 56)
- Place of birth: Madagascar
- Position: Defender

Team information
- Current team: USCA Foot

Senior career*
Years	Team	Apps	(Gls)
2003–2004	FC CEM		
2005–	USCA Foot		

International career
1999–	Madagascar		
- * Club domestic league appearances and goals

Alain Rakotondramanana (born 16 April 1970) is a Malagasy footballer for USCA Foot.
