= Assani Bajope =

Ugandan footballer (born 1982)

Personal information
- Date of birth: April 14, 1982 (age 44)
- Place of birth: Uganda
- Height: 1.80 m (5 ft 11 in)
- Position: Midfielder

Senior career*
Years	Team	Apps	(Gls)
2004–2006	Kampala City Council FC		
2006–2009	Saint-George SA		

International career
2003–2008	Uganda	20	(3)
- * Club domestic league appearances and goals as of August 31, 2007

Assani Bajope (born April 14, 1982) is a Former Ugandan footballer.

== Trivia ==
Operating as a defensive midfielder, Bajope played for Kampala City Council FC before a transfer to Ethiopian Premier League club Saint-George SA in July 2006.

== International ==
He was also a member of Uganda national football team with more than 20 caps, playing from 2003–2008.

=== International goals ===
Scores and results list Uganda's goal tally first.

No	Date	Venue	Opponent	Score	Result	Competition
1.	22 June 2003	Kumasi Sports Stadium, Kumasi, Ghana	Ghana	1–0	1–1	2004 Africa Cup of Nations qualification
2.	11 October 2003	Mandela National Stadium, Kampala, Uganda	Mauritius	1–0	3–0	2006 FIFA World Cup qualification
3.	11 December 2007	National Stadium, Dar es Salaam, Tanzania	Rwanda	2–0	2–0	2007 CECAFA Cup
