= Nana Arhin Duah =

Ghanaian football striker

Nana Duah
Personal information
- Full name: Nana Arhin Duah
- Date of birth: September 14, 1980 (age 46)
- Place of birth: Ghana
- Position: Forward

Senior career*
Years	Team	Apps	(Gls)
1997–1999	Ashanti Gold SC		
2000–2008	Asante Kotoko		
2008–2009	Ashanti Gold SC		

International career^{‡}
2000–2005	Ghana	8	(4)
- * Club domestic league appearances and goals ‡ National team caps and goals as of June 28, 2008

Nana Arhin Duah (born September 14, 1980) is a Ghanaian football striker, who last played for Ashanti Gold SC.

== Career ==
Duah began his career in Ashanti Gold SC. In 1997 the team won the CAF Champions League. He moved after 3 years, in January 2000, to Asante Kotoko.

In the season 2007/08, he became champion with Asante Kotoko, and he won the President's Cup with his team. He scored for Kotoko in their second MTN CAF Champions League Group A match against CS Sfaxien a goal.

After eight years with Asante Kotoko, he turned back to his youth club and signed a three years contract with Ashanti Gold SC on 24 October 2008. He left the team on 26 April 2009.

== International ==
He played in Ghana's 2006 World Cup preliminary qualifier against Somalia, scoring two goals, but did not feature much for Ghana subsequently.

== Honors ==
- Runner up 1997: CAF Champions League
