= Ahmed Sidibé (footballer, born 1974) =

Mauritanian football manager and former player

Personal information
- Full name: Ahmed Moussa Sidibé
- Date of birth: 2 May 1974 (age 52) (Note: Some sources claim Sidibé's date of birth is 25 December 1974.)
- Place of birth: Nouakchott, Mauritania
- Height: 1.82 m (6 ft 0 in)
- Position: Striker

Team information
- Current team: US La Gacilly (manager)

Senior career*
Years	Team	Apps	(Gls)
1993–1999	ACS Ksar		
1999–2000	Angers B		
2000–2002	La Vitréenne		
2002–2003	Pontivy	29	(19)
2003–2004	Nîmes	21	(1)
2004–2005	Luçon		
2005	Avranches		
2005–2006	Gazélec Ajaccio	23	(4)
2006–2007	Clermont	3	(0)
2007	FU Narbonne		
2007–2008	Saint-Malo		
2008	Mesaimeer		
2008–2011	Châteaubriant		
2012–2015	FCAV Redon		

International career
1994–2008	Mauritania	19	(5)

Managerial career
- 2012–2019: FCAV Redon
- 2019–: US La Gacilly
- * Club domestic league appearances and goals

Ahmed Moussa Sidibé (Arabic: احمد موسى سيديبي; born 2 May 1974) is a Mauritanian professional football manager and former player who played as a striker. As of 2021, he is the head coach of Régional 2 club US La Gacilly. During his playing career, he scored five goals in nineteen games for the Mauritania national team.
