= Ablade Morgan =

Ghanaian footballer

Personal information
- Full name: Abladey Morgan
- Date of birth: 13 September 1980 (age 46)
- Place of birth: Ashaiman, Ghana
- Position: Midfielder

Youth career
- Afienya United Tema
- Liberty Professionals F.C.

Senior career*
Years	Team	Apps	(Gls)
2004–2007	Accra Hearts of Oak SC		

International career^{‡}
2004	Ghana	3	(1)
- * Club domestic league appearances and goals as of 7 August 2008 ‡ National team caps and goals as of 7 August 2008

Abladey Morgan (born September 13, 1980) is a Ghanaian football (soccer) player last playing at the position of midfielder for Accra Hearts of Oak SC.

== Career ==
He began his career by Accra Hearts of Oak SC, he is also one of Accra Hearts of Oak's most experienced strikers. In 2005, he had an unsuccessful trial with Al Nasr club of Saudi Arabia.

== International ==
In 2004 played his one and only game for the Ghana national football team. He was one of the 2004 golden generation of Accra hearts of oak under the late Sir Jones Atuquayfio who won the prestigious trophy in Kumasi after playing a 1–1 draw.
