= Teshome Getu =

Ethiopian footballer

Personal information
- Full name: Teshome Adamu Getu
- Date of birth: 7 February 1983 (age 43)
- Place of birth: Ethiopia
- Height: 1.75 m (5 ft 9 in)
- Position: Midfielder

Team information
- Current team: EEPCO
- Number: 7

Senior career*
Years	Team	Apps	(Gls)
2001–2002	Banks SC	98	(59)
2002–2006	Saint-George SA	147	(79)
2006–present	EEPCO	65	(58)

International career
2002–present	Ethiopia	84	(34)
- * Club domestic league appearances and goals as of 1 February 2007

Teshome Getu (Amharic: ጠስሆመ ጘቱ, born 7 February 1983 in Ethiopia) is an Ethiopian football midfielder. He currently plays for EEPCO.

== International career ==
Getu is a member of the Ethiopia national football team and he was a member of the Ethiopia squad at the 2001 FIFA World Youth Cup.

== Honors ==
- Ethiopian Premier League: 3

2003–04, 2004–05, 2005–06

- Ethiopian Super Cup: 2

2005, 2006
