= 2006 FIFA World Cup qualification (CAF) =

Association football qualification rounds

Tournament details
- Dates: 10 October 2003 – 9 October 2005
- Teams: 51 (from 1 confederation)

Tournament statistics
- Matches played: 190
- Goals scored: 506 (2.66 per match)
- Attendance: 5,616,922 (29,563 per match)
- Top scorer(s): (Togo) Emmanuel Adebayor (11 goals)

Listed below are the dates and results for the 2006 FIFA World Cup qualification rounds for Africa. 51 teams took part (only Comoros and Djibouti did not enter), competing for 5 World Cup places.

== Format ==
The qualification composed of two rounds.

- First round: Nine teams entered the competition directly in the second round: the five teams that qualified for the 2002 World Cup Finals (Cameroon, Nigeria, Senegal, South Africa, and Tunisia) and the four highest-ranking teams in the 25 June 2003 FIFA world rankings (Congo DR, Côte d'Ivoire, Egypt, and Morocco). The other 42 teams were paired to play knock-out matches home and away. The 21 winners would advance to the second round.
- Second round: In the second round, the 30 teams were divided into five groups of six teams each. Teams in each group would play home and away against each other. The team with most points in each group would qualify to the World Cup.

The competition also constituted the qualification competition for the 2006 African Nations Cup with the top three nations of each group qualifying (except for Egypt, which qualifies as the host nation, the fourth nation in Egypt's group qualifying in Egypt's place, which is Libya).

The African qualifying zone saw four out of five finals places going to World Cup debutants (Angola, Togo, Côte d'Ivoire and Ghana). Nigeria missed out on a fourth consecutive finals appearance while Cameroon did not reach their fifth consecutive finals.

The African zone also featured a group of death — Group 3, which brought together Africa's most frequent World Cup qualifier Cameroon with the two eventual finalists of the 2006 Africa Cup of Nations: Egypt and the Ivory Coast.

== First round ==
Team 1	Agg.	Team 2	1st leg	2nd leg
Guinea-Bissau	1–4	Mali	1–2	0–2
Madagascar	3–4	Benin	1–1	2–3
Seychelles	1–5	Zambia	0–4	1–1
Botswana	4–1	Lesotho	4–1	0–0
Equatorial Guinea	1–2	Togo	1–0	0–2
São Tomé and Príncipe	0–9	Libya	0–1	0–8
Tanzania	0–3	Kenya	0–0	0–3
Niger	0–7	Algeria	0–1	0–6
Uganda	4–3	Mauritius	3–0	1–3 (a.e.t.)
Sudan	3–0	Eritrea	3–0	0–0
Zimbabwe	4–2	Mauritania	3–0	1–2
Swaziland	1–4	Cape Verde	1–1	0–3
Burundi	1–4	Gabon	0–0	1–4
Chad	3–3(a)	Angola	3–1	0–2
Congo	2–1	Sierra Leone	1–0	1–1
Ethiopia	1–3	Malawi	1–3	0–0
Rwanda	4–1	Namibia	3–0	1–1
Guinea	5–3	Mozambique	1–0	4–3
Gambia	2–3	Liberia	2–0	0–3
Somalia	0–7	Ghana	0–5	0–2
Burkina Faso	w/o	Central African Republic		

== Second round ==
=== Group 1 ===
Pos	Team	Pld	W	D	L	GF	GA	GD	Pts	Qualification	(Togo)	(Senegal)	(Zambia)	(Republic of the Congo)	(Mali)	(Liberia)
1	Togo	10	7	2	1	20	8	+12	23	2006 FIFA World Cup and 2006 Africa Cup of Nations	—	3–1	4–1	2–0	1–0	3–0
2	Senegal	10	6	3	1	21	8	+13	21	2006 Africa Cup of Nations	2–2	—	1–0	2–0	3–0	6–1
3	Zambia	10	6	1	3	16	10	+6	19	2006 Africa Cup of Nations	1–0	0–1	—	2–0	2–1	1–0
4	Congo	10	3	1	6	10	14	−4	10		2–3	0–0	2–3	—	1–0	3–0
5	Mali	10	2	2	6	11	14	−3	8		1–2	2–2	1–1	2–0	—	4–1
6	Liberia	10	1	1	8	3	27	−24	4		0–0	0–3	0–5	0–2	1–0	—

Rules for classification: Tiebreakers

=== Group 2 ===
Pos	Team	Pld	W	D	L	GF	GA	GD	Pts	Qualification	(Ghana)	(Democratic Republic of the Congo)	(South Africa)	(Burkina Faso)	(Cape Verde)	(Uganda)
1	Ghana	10	6	3	1	17	4	+13	21	2006 FIFA World Cup and 2006 Africa Cup of Nations	—	0–0	3–0	2–1	2–0	2–0
2	DR Congo	10	4	4	2	14	10	+4	16 (Note: Head-to-head points: Congo DR 4, South Africa 1.)	2006 Africa Cup of Nations	1–1	—	1–0	3–2	2–1	4–0
3	South Africa	10	5	1	4	12	14	−2	16	2006 Africa Cup of Nations	0–2	2–2	—	2–0	2–1	2–1
4	Burkina Faso	10	4	1	5	14	13	+1	13		1–0	2–0	3–1	—	1–2	2–0
5	Cape Verde	10	3	1	6	8	15	−7	10		0–4	1–1	1–2	1–0	—	1–0
6	Uganda	10	2	2	6	6	15	−9	8		1–1	1–0	0–1	2–2	1–0	—

Rules for classification: Tiebreakers

=== Group 3 ===
Pos	Team	Pld	W	D	L	GF	GA	GD	Pts	Qualification	(Ivory Coast)	(Cameroon)	(Egypt)	(Libya)	(Sudan)	(Benin)
1	Ivory Coast	10	7	1	2	20	7	+13	22	2006 FIFA World Cup and 2006 Africa Cup of Nations	—	2–3	2–0	2–0	5–0	3–0
2	Cameroon	10	6	3	1	18	10	+8	21	2006 Africa Cup of Nations	2–0	—	1–1	1–0	2–1	2–1
3	Egypt (Note: Egypt had already qualified directly to the Africa Cup of Nations as hosts, leaving Libya, the fourth-placed team, to qualify to the Africa Cup of Nations.)	10	5	2	3	26	15	+11	17	2006 Africa Cup of Nations	1–2	3–2	—	4–1	6–1	4–1
4	Libya	10	3	3	4	8	10	−2	12	2006 Africa Cup of Nations	0–0	0–0	2–1	—	0–0	4–1
5	Sudan	10	1	3	6	6	22	−16	6		1–3	1–1	0–3	0–1	—	1–0
6	Benin	10	1	2	7	9	23	−14	5		0–1	1–4	3–3	1–0	1–1	—

Rules for classification: Tiebreakers

=== Group 4 ===
Pos	Team	Pld	W	D	L	GF	GA	GD	Pts	Qualification	(Angola)	(Nigeria)	(Zimbabwe)	(Gabon)	(Algeria)	(Rwanda)
1	Angola	10	6	3	1	12	6	+6	21 (Note: Head-to-head points: Angola 4, Nigeria 1.)	2006 FIFA World Cup and 2006 Africa Cup of Nations	—	1–0	1–0	3–0	2–1	1–0
2	Nigeria	10	6	3	1	21	7	+14	21	2006 Africa Cup of Nations	1–1	—	5–1	2–0	1–0	2–0
3	Zimbabwe	10	4	3	3	13	14	−1	15	2006 Africa Cup of Nations	2–0	0–3	—	1–0	1–1	3–1
4	Gabon	10	2	4	4	11	13	−2	10		2–2	1–1	1–1	—	0–0	3–0
5	Algeria	10	1	5	4	8	15	−7	8		0–0	2–5	2–2	0–3	—	1–0
6	Rwanda	10	1	2	7	6	16	−10	5		0–1	1–1	0–2	3–1	1–1	—

Rules for classification: Tiebreakers

=== Group 5 ===
Pos	Team	Pld	W	D	L	GF	GA	GD	Pts	Qualification	(Tunisia)	(Morocco)	(Guinea)	(Kenya)	(Botswana)	(Malawi)
1	Tunisia	10	6	3	1	25	9	+16	21	2006 FIFA World Cup and 2006 Africa Cup of Nations	—	2–2	2–0	1–0	4–1	7–0
2	Morocco	10	5	5	0	17	7	+10	20	2006 Africa Cup of Nations	1–1	—	1–0	5–1	1–0	4–1
3	Guinea	10	5	2	3	15	10	+5	17	2006 Africa Cup of Nations	2–1	1–1	—	1–0	4–0	3–1
4	Kenya	10	3	1	6	8	17	−9	10		0–2	0–0	2–1	—	1–0	3–2
5	Botswana	10	3	0	7	10	18	−8	9		1–3	0–1	1–2	2–1	—	2–0
6	Malawi	10	1	3	6	12	26	−14	6		2–2	1–1	1–1	3–0	1–3	—

Rules for classification: Tiebreakers

== Qualified teams ==
The following five teams from CAF qualified for the final tournament.

Team	Qualified as	Qualified on	Previous appearances in FIFA World Cup^{1}
Togo	Second Round Group 1 winners	8 October 2005	0 (debut)
Ghana	Second Round Group 2 winners	8 October 2005	0 (debut)
Ivory Coast	Second Round Group 3 winners	8 October 2005	0 (debut)
Angola	Second Round Group 4 winners	8 October 2005	0 (debut)
Tunisia	Second Round Group 5 winners	8 October 2005	3 (1978, 1998, 2002)

^{1} Bold indicates champions for that year. Italic indicates hosts for that year.

== Top goalscorers ==
There were 506 goals scored in 190 matches, for an average of 2.66 goals per match.

11 goals

- (Togo) Emmanuel Adebayor

9 goals

- (Ivory Coast) Didier Drogba

8 goals

- (Nigeria) Obafemi Martins

7 goals

- (Ivory Coast) Aruna Dindane
- (Senegal) Henri Camara

6 goals

- (Cameroon) Pierre Webó
- (Egypt) Amr Zaki
- (Guinea) Sambégou Bangoura
- (Kenya) Dennis Oliech
- (Tunisia) Francileudo Santos

Below are full goalscorer lists for the each round:

- First round
- Second round
