= The Contemporary African Art Collection =

Museum in Switzerland

The Contemporary African Art Collection (CAAC) is a private collection created in 1989 by Jean Pigozzi, an Italian businessman, after his encounter with French independent curator, André Magnin. Magnin specializes in art from non-Western cultures, and especially sub-Saharan art. The CAAC came into being at a time when non-Western contemporary art was largely ignored on the international scene. It was founded shortly after the seminal exhibition The Magicians of the Earth at the Pompidou Center in Paris, curated by Jean-Huber Martin. It was the first truly international exhibition where contemporary works from all over the world were shown on an equal footing. As of May 2022, the collection was based in Geneva, Switzerland, but it "does not have a permanent exhibition venue".

The CAAC includes several thousand artworks, featuring sculptures, drawings, photographs, installations and videos, by more than 80 artists, living and working in sub-Saharan African countries. Some of its artists live in large cities and attended art schools. Others were "self-taught" and some are from remote areas and work within local traditions that they extend and enrich.

The CAAC regularly organizes exhibitions and artwork loans in major museums and art foundations around the world, such as Tate Modern (London), Pompidou Center (Paris), Guggenheim Bilbao, Metropolitan Museum (NY), Museum of Fine Arts, Houston (Texas), National Museum of African Art (Washington), Cartier Foundation (Paris) and the Saatchi Gallery (London). The CAAC also has published several catalogues and monographies.

== Artists in the collection ==
- Georges Adéagbo
- Philip Kwame Apagya
- Willie Bester
- Pierre Bodo (painter)
- Amani Bodo
- Bodo Fils
- Frédéric Bruly Bouabré
- Seni Awa Camara
- Demba Camara
- Chéri Chérin
- Kudzanai Chiurai
- Calixte Dakpogan
- Jean Depara
- Jean-Jacques Efiaimbelo
- John Fundi
- Gedewon
- John Goba
- Emile Guebehi & Nicolas Damas
- Gugulective
- Daniel Halter
- Romuald Hazoumé
- Kane Kwei
- Seydou Keïta
- Bodys Isek Kingelez
- David Koloane
- Agbagli Kossi
- Koffi Kouakou
- Cheik Ledy
- George Lilanga
- Maître Syms
- Titos Mabota
- Esther Mahlangu
- Abu Bakarr Mansaray
- Adelino Vasco Mendonça
- Papa Mfumu’eto 1er
- Moké
- Baudouin Mouanda
- Ambroise Ngaimoko (Studio 3Z)
- Jean-Baptiste Ngetchopa
- Rigobert Nimi
- J.D. ‘Okhai Ojeikere
- Joshua Okoromodeke
- Richard Onyango
- Paramount Photographers
- Chéri Samba
- Johannes Segogela
- Kura Shomali
- Shula
- Malick Sidibé
- Pascale Marthine Tayou
- François Thango
- Barthelemy Toguo
- Cyprien Tokoudagba
- Pathy Tshindele
- Zephania Tshuma
- Zinsou
