= Bodo (painter) =

Congolese artist (1953 – 2015)

- Born: Camille-Pierre Pambu Bodo; 1953; Mandu, Democratic Republic of the Congo, Nord-Ubangi
- Died: March 5, 2015 (aged 61–62)
- Occupation(s): Painter, pastor

Camille-Pierre Pambu Bodo, known as Bodo (1953 – March 5, 2015), was a painter and pastor from the Democratic Republic of Congo. He lived in Kinshasa. Bodo was one of the founders and key proponents of the Zaïre School of Popular Painting. His works, along with those of other artists, vigorously exemplify their belief in their capacity to create art that could change history.

== Early life ==
Bodo was born in 1953 and raised in Mandu. He finished his secondary schooling in Mandu in 1970, and moved to Kinshasa the same year in order to partake in the landmark exhibition Art Partout. In 1980, Bodo converted to Christianity and became the pastor of world evangelism within the Pentecostal Church and was convinced that it would change his life.

== Influences and impact ==
Bodo finds inspiration from his several trips around both Europe and the United States of America. He is also inspired by the reality of both the city he resides in and the citizens within his community. Bodo stated, “I express everything that happens to me, so that I am no longer focused on specifically African topics and can address myself to the entire world.” The majority of his scenes encounter partially or fully human figures in a landscape. He incorporates flora and faune, and underwater life to display his perceptions the places he has experienced. He paints from sight or experience. Bodo's style of art takes after the work of Hieronymous Bosch. Bodo's resemblance to Bosch's work can be seen specifically through his piece titled, "Le fleuve de délice" (The River of Delight) both in title and stylistic approach. In the 1990s his style of art changed to fantasy and incorporated symbolism in order to share his dreams of a better world. Le fleuve de délice (The River of Delight), Je suis unique dans mon genre (I Am One of a Kind), Ignorance, or Love, the Source of Life, perfectly echo his beliefs. These paintings are significant in displaying the transformation of style that Bodo developed from the 1990s, and onward. They display the way Bodo alters human figures into creating a figure of hybridity between nature and humans.

== Themes and styles ==
In the 1990s Bodo's style of art changed to be of fantasy and symbolic nature. Most of his work that is showcased was created following the 1990s. The majority of Bodo's work is considered to be somewhat surreal. In the bulk of his artwork he is putting together pieces of the human figure, and combining it with a part of nature. Bodo creates creatures that are seen as half human and half animal that come from fantasy worlds. An example of such is a piece titled, Bodostar; It features a creature that is half man – half bird. The aims of a portion of his artwork were created in the purpose of discouraging sorcery as a practice; this theme is known as “Ndoki Zoba”.

== Career highlights ==
Bodo is one of the founders and key proponents along with Moké and Chéri Samba of what has come to be known as the Zaïre School of Popular Painting. Their works state vigorously and candidly their belief in their capacity to create art that could change the course of history.

== Exhibitions ==
Bodo partook in the landmark exhibition Art Partout. His work has been displayed expansively in Europe. Bodo's work can be seen at Tate Modern, the Guggenheim Bilbao, and in the Contemporary African Art Collection (CAAC) of Jean Pigozzi.

=== Solo ===
- 2000 Bodo, peintre congolais, Hôtel Sponeck, Montbéliard, France

=== Group ===
- 2011 JapanCongo, Magasin Grenoble, France
- 2010 African Stories, Marrakech Art Fair, Marrakech
- 2007/2008 Why Africa? Pinacoteca Giovanni e Marella Agnelli, Turin, Italy
- 2007/2008 "Popular Painting" from Kinshasa, Tate Modern, London, UK
- 2006/2007 100% Africa, Guggenheim Museum, Bilbao, Spain
- 2005 Arts of Africa, Grimaldi Forum, Monaco, France
- 2005 African Art Now: Masterpieces from the Jean Pigozzi Collection, Museum of Fine Art Houston, USA
- 2004 Les Afriques, Tri Postal, Lille, France
- 2003 Kin Moto na Bruxelles, Hôtel de Ville, Brussels, Belgium
- 2002 Galerie Marc Dengis, Brussels, Belgium
- 2001 La Cité dans la Peinture Populaire, Wallonie-Bruxelles Center, Belgium
- 1996 Bomoi Mobimba -Toute la Vie, Fine Art Palace, Charleroi, France
