= J'en rêve =

2005 contemporary art exhibition in Paris

J'en Rêve (lit. 'I Dream About It'), was a large international exhibition of contemporary art which took place in the Summer of 2005 at the Fondation Cartier pour l'Art Contemporain in Paris, France. The purpose of the exhibition was to introduce a wide variety of practices and perspectives from young artists around the world.

== Reviews ==
The exhibition was reviewed favorably in several major international art publications, covered by news outlets, and regarded as an important showcase for emerging international art talents. Writing in l'Humanite, Anne Charlotte Hinet said, "The real originality of 'I Dream About It' is to enable the gathering of all these cultures and these experiences. You would think this might create a cacophony, but it does not. The exhibition is a breath of a fresh air. The designer Mathieu Lehanneur has used the space in a clever and sophisticated fashion, bringing these artists to work together in respect for their world." Vincent Vella remarked, "Their exhibition is a reflection of our modern-day world, in which the boundaries between disciplines are breaking down. 'J'en Reve' embraces contemporary art in all forms, in all styles. Here it means everything, including painting, video, installations, photography and fashion, proposing a vision that is global, nonexclusive, unprejudiced. The work selected shows the vitality, talent and spirit of youth. It shows how an artist living in Buenos Aires, New-York, Tokyo, or Paris perceives the world by our times."

Serena Davies, writing for The Daily Telegraph, remarked: "The fascinating thing is that the 58 artists in the show aren't producing the work you might expect. In contrast to, say, the Beck's Futures exhibition held recently at London's ICA, a show of older artists considered by some to be exemplary, the work is accessible, surprisingly conservative, and frequently beautiful," and "It isn't particularly interested in politics, or sex, or even that favourite of the Chapman Brothers and Damien Hirst, death. It is primarily inward-looking, exploring the age-old archetype of the self, but also the very process of making art. And this process, according to the new generation, is something to be executed with exquisite skill."

Not all critics looked favorably on the exhibition, however. Critic Therry Laurent noted the commercialism of art today, remarking, "In fact, the question arises: can we have fifty artists across media, without choking their proposals?...The aim of such an approach would be to present the Museum, the institution, rather than the works. Contemporary artists continue to multiply as anonymous pawns in favor of global capital." In contrast, Renaud Baronian, writing for French Daily, wrote in Le Parisien, "The results of the exhibition reflect the exuberance of youth. In short, the works are funny, original, and appropriate for all ages."

From the exhibition catalogue: "Representing the state of budding international creation and depicting a self-portrait of young artists today, the exhibition J’en Rêve explores a privileged and fleeting moment: that of becoming an artist, when one must differentiate oneself from what is acquired at school, construct one’s own universe, go above and beyond one’s influences to use them as references for a personal language. For the first time in their lives, these young talents are presenting their work in an international institution. At this stage of their lives, most are not yet represented by galleries or recognized by the art establishment."

== Participating artists ==
Artists were chosen for inclusion in the exhibition by Gary Hill, Jack Pierson, Takashi Murakami, Giuseppe Penone, Guillermo Kutica, Barry McGee, Nan Goldin, Nancy Rubins, among others. In addition to recommendations, news of the show spread among young artists by word of mouth, and over 1200 unsolicited applications arrived at the Fondation.

Artists who participated in the exhibition included:

- Alek O.
- Chiara Banfi
- Rita Barbosa and Paulo Pimenta
- Jonas Bendiksen
- Natalia Benedetti
- Mana Bernardes
- Jan Henri Booyens
- Roxane Borujerdi
- Simon Boudvin
- Thomas Brauer
- Yaima Carrazana Ciudad
- Carolina Caycedo
- Christian Curiel
- Flavia Da Rin
- Paul Gabrielli
- Ronald Gerber
- Xenia Gnilitskaya
- Victoire Gounod
- Ham Jin
- Peter Harkawik
- Camille Henrot
- Anastasia Yümeko Hill
- Gaëlle Hippolyte
- Sarah Anne Johnson
- Sako Kojima
- Mahomi Kunikata
- Thomas Lélu
- Catalina León
- Élodie Lesourd
- Liang Yue
- Martinha Maia
- Justin Manor
- Augusto Marban
- Angelika Markul
- Erina Matsui
- Zoë Mendelson
- Blanca Nieto
- Jaime Alberto Ortiz Lozano
- Thunska Pansittivorakul
- Ted Partin
- Clémence Périgon
- Liliane Phung
- Charlotte Planche
- Nicolas Pol
- Wendy Red Star
- Thiago Rocha Pitta
- Clare Rojas and Andrew Jeffrey Wright
- Yusuke Sakamoto
- Setareh Shahbazi
- Ranjani Shettar
- Mariko Shindo
- Daniel Silvo
- Kouichi Tabata
- Yuko Takeyama
- Jennifer Taylor
- Charwei Tsai
