= Gedewon =

Ethiopian artist

Gedewon Makonnen
- Born: 1939; Begemder, Ethiopia
- Died: 1995 (aged 55–56); Därtähal, Ethiopia
- Education: Trained as a cleric in the Ethiopian Orthodox Church
- Known for: Talismanic drawings sought after by Western collectors
- Notable work: Works in The Contemporary African Art Collection (CAAC) of Jean Pigozzi
- Style: Drawing; Talismanic art
- Movement: Outsider art Ethiopian talismanic tradition

Gedewon Makonnen, called Gedewon (1939–1995), was an Ethiopian artist.

Born in Begemder, Gedewon trained as a cleric in the Ethiopian Orthodox Church. As part of his training, he learned to draw talismans, which soon became much sought-after among Western collectors. Some of his drawings are now in The Contemporary African Art Collection (CAAC) of Jean Pigozzi. He died in Därtähal in 1995.

== Exhibitions ==
- 2005 Arts of Africa, Grimaldi Forum, Monaco, France
- 2005 African Art Now : Masterpieces from the Jean Pigozzi Collection, Museum of Fine Art Houston, USA
- 2003 – 2004 Vernacular Visionaries: International Outsider Art in Context, Museum of International Folk Art, Santa Fe, New Mexico, USA
- 2002 Art that Heals, Apex Art, New York, USA
- 2001 Dessins Choisis, Forum Culturel de Blanc-Mesnil, Le Blanc-Mesnil, France
- 2001 Working in the Spirit : Gedewon and Vyakul, Cavin-Morris Gallery, New York, USA
- 2000 Partage d’Exotismes, La Halle Tony Garnier, Lyon, France
- 1998 Africa, Africa: A vibrant Art from a Dynamic Continent, Tobu Museum of Art, Tokyo, Japan
