= Chéri Chérin =

Congolese painter (1955–2025)

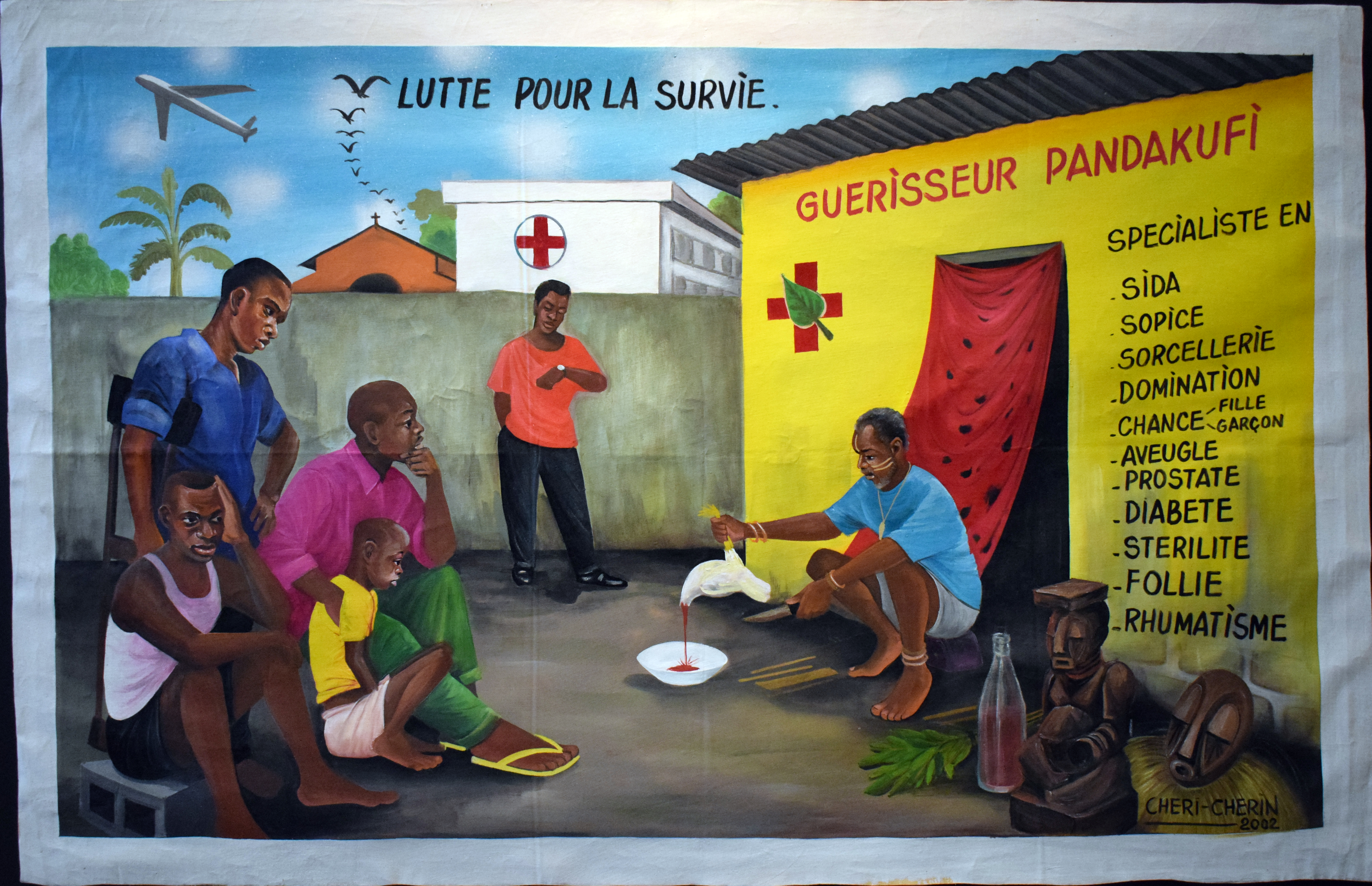
- Lutte pour la survie (2002)
- Born: Joseph Kinkonda; 16 February 1955; Léopoldville, Belgian Congo
- Died: 19 October 2025 (aged 70)
- Education: Académie des Beaux-Arts, Kinshasa
- Occupation: Painter

Joseph Kinkonda (16 February 1955 – 19 October 2025), better known by his nom de plume Chéri Chérin, was a Congolese painter.

Chérin was one of the most popular contemporary artists in the Democratic Republic of the Congo, alongside Chéri Samba and Moké, and expressed Congolese daily life in his paintings. His taste for political satire caused him legal trouble during the regime of President Mobutu Sese Seko.

Chérin died on 19 October 2025, at the age of 70.
