= Philip Kwame Apagya =

Ghanaian photographer (born 1958)

Philip Kwame Apagya (born 1958) is a Ghanaian photographer who specialises in colour studio portraits against painted backdrops. He lives and works in Shama, Ghana.

== Life and career ==
Philip Kwame Apagya was born in Sekondi, Ghana, in 1958, and as the son of a photographer was apprenticed in his father's studio as a boy. Apagya studied photojournalism at the Accra School of Journalism, before opening his own studio in Shama, on Ghana's west coast, in 1982. He is known today for his studio portraits made using brightly coloured backdrops.

Apagya's work is in The Contemporary African Art Collection (CAAC) of Jean Pigozzi.

Apagya's works have been exhibited at the Museum of Contemporary Photography in Chicago, the Sheldon Art Galleries in Nebraska, and the Philadelphia Museum of Art, among other venues. His photographs are in many collections, including the Metropolitan Museum of Art, New York City, NY, and the Studio Museum in Harlem, New York, NY.

Apagya is represented by Fifty One Fine Art Photography in Antwerp, Belgium.

== Art work ==
Apagya challenged the traditional methodology in his executions of studio portrait art and introduced new concepts into the form of photography. Born into the first generation of an independent Ghana, he brought modern qualities of consumerism into his art through his backgrounds. Apagya paints shelves with televisions and speakers with enlarged main brand names, such as Sony, and refrigerators stocked full of food in his backdrops of interior locations, and for exterior locations he paints the famous and wealthy streets of Ghana as well as the Accra International Airport.

Apagya combines classic elements of traditional African culture with the modern world of western consumerism by filling his backgrounds with material goods consistent with depictions of western middle-class lifestyle, and having his subjects remain in traditional clothing.

== Exhibitions ==
=== Solo exhibitions ===
- 2005: Rena Branston Gallery, San Francisco
- 2004: Recent Photographs, Jack Shainman Gallery, New York
- 2003: Philip Kwame Apagya, Galerie Stähli, Zürich, Germany
- 2002: Philip Kwame Apagya, Galerie Schuebbe, Düsseldorf, Germany
- 2002: Apagya Portraits, Iwalewa-Haus, Bayreuth
- 2002: Berlin Portraits by Philip Kwame Apagya, Goethe-Institut, Accra and Ghana National Museum, Accra
- 2002: Philip Kwame Apagya, Alliance Francaise, Bahia
- 2000: Philip Kwame Apagya Portraits, Galerie Forma Libera, Turin, Italy
- 2000: Philip Kwame Apagya, Disegni Animati, Galerie Louisa delle Piane, Mailand
