= Zoe Mendelson =

Glasgow-based British artist

- Born: 17 April 1976 (age 50)
- Occupation: Artist

Zoë Mendelson (born 17 April 1976) is a Glasgow-based British artist.

== Biography ==
Mendelson studied Fine Art, Painting at Chelsea College of Art and Design from 1995 to 1998 and at the Royal College of Art from 1998 to 2000. She has a practice-based PhD from Central Saint Martins (2015) and currently practices in Glasgow.

From 2015 to 2021 Zoë Mendelson was Head of BA Painting at Wimbledon College of Art (UAL), London. She is now Head of Painting and Printmaking at Glasgow School of Art. She is a co-editor of The Edit - an online, interactive and inclusive bibliography for Fine Art students.

Mendelson has exhibited widely showing works, performing and publishing, nationally and internationally - largely in public spaces, including Science Museum, London (2018), Fondation Cartier pour l'Art Contemporain in Paris (2005) and Chapter Centre for Contemporary Arts in Cardiff (2006). Her work is also installed permanently (visibly and covertly) in public buildings, such as at Town Hall Hotel, London.

== Work ==
Zoë Mendelson is an artist and writer with a collagist practice, using collation as a methodological framework for creating networks between psychoanalytic theory, psychotherapeutic practice, spatial theory, fine art and critical practice. Her work includes various forms of writing (fiction and non-fiction), collage, drawing, performance, animation and installation. Zoë's research engages disorder as a culturally produced phenomenon, in parallel to its clinical counterpart, suggesting its value to knowledge production within Fine Art and critical theory.

Her PhD, at Central Saint Martins, was titled ‘Psychologies and Spaces of Accumulation: The hoard as collagist methodology (and other stories)’. This research locates and spatialises systematised archiving alongside seemingly pathological object relations, and includes relationships drawn between urban space and wellness.

Mendelson has recently worked on a project entitled ‘This Mess is a Place’, which is supported by Wellcome Trust and produced by Artsadmin. The project focuses on psychopathology of hoarding at its intersection with rationalised collection. It was timed to coincide with the publication of the fifth edition of the Diagnostic and Statistical Manual of Mental Disorders and its inclusion of Hoarding Disorder.

In 2010 four of Mendelson's works were selected by Artsadmin and Iwona Blazwick to be permanently installed at Town Hall Hotel, London.

As part of a solo show on 26 November 2008 Mendelson performed with a sugarcrafter at Galerie Édouard Manet, Gennevilliers. For four hours they constructed drawn and sugared sandcastles, which were then eaten and erased.

In 2007 Mendelson made an online work commissioned by Cartier. Titled The Envelope Machine which referenced advances in postal technologies at the time of the 1851 Great Exhibition in London and operated as a hand drawn, and ultimately unrequited, version of Outlook Express.

Also in 2007, Mendelson received an Arts Council England Grant for the Arts to create a work called Scheherezade's Sideboard which has since been shown at Transition Gallery, London and Galerie Édouard Manet, Gennevilliers.

Mendelson co-convenes the network paintingresearch with artist, Geraint Evans.

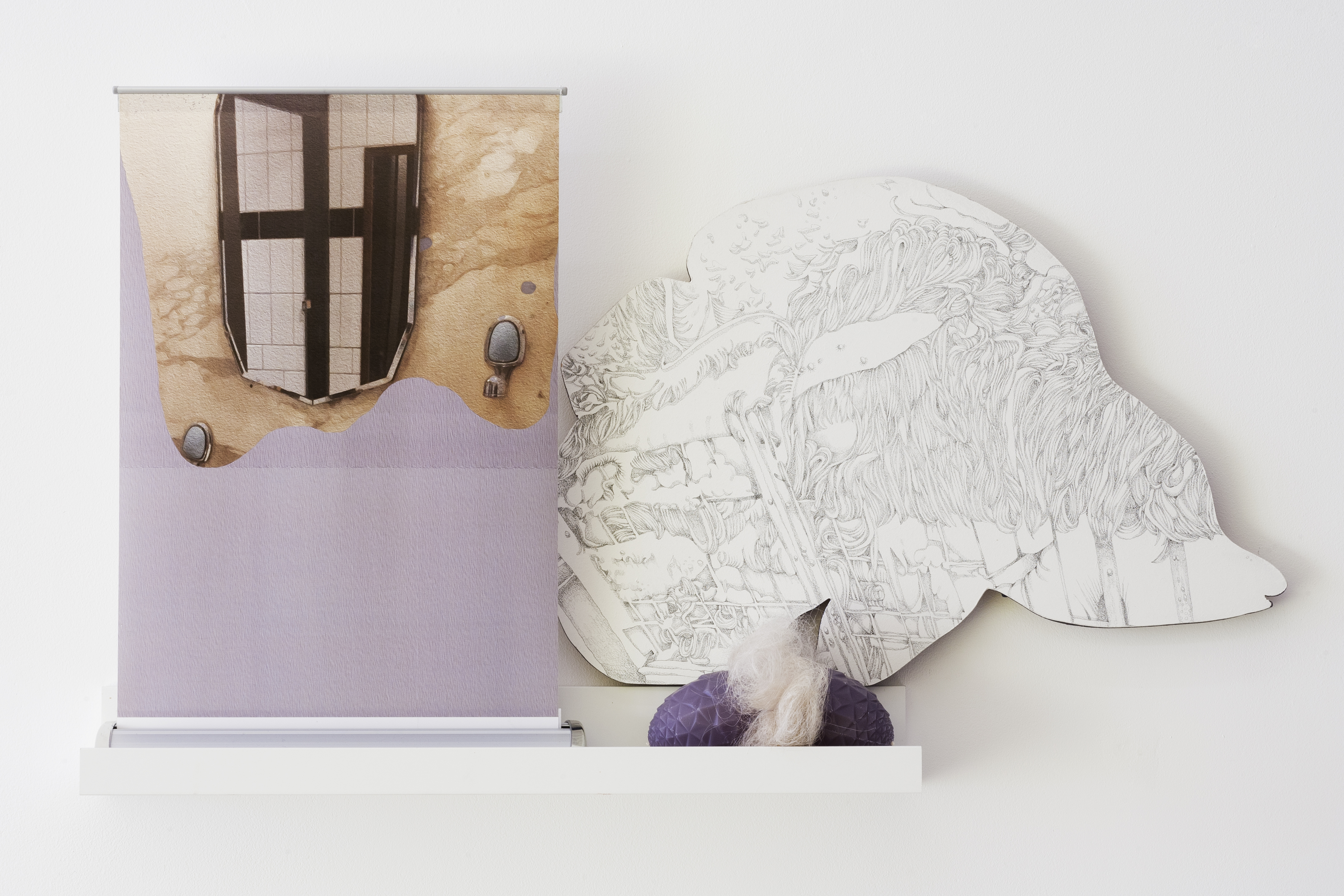

== Bibliography ==
- 30 May 2018: Hoard as Home: Clutter as Comfort, Performance/lecture, Science Museum, London
- March 2017: Spectacular Evidence: Theatres of the Observed Mind, one-day event in the theatre at Artsadmin, Toynbee Studios curated by Zoë Mendelson
- May 2016: Wayfaring, &Model, Leeds
- Oct 2015: Museum of the Unwanted, pub. Kunstmuseum Olten, 66 pages, colour.
- Oct. 2013: This Mess is a Place: A Collapsible Anthology of Collections and Clutter, 205 pages. Edited, Compiled and misfiled by Zoë Mendelson, funded Wellcome Trust, pub. And Publishing.
- Sept. 2011: Inconscients! (Les artistes et la psychanalyse), 170 pages, colour, Galerie Alfa, Paris
- March 2010: The Journal of Performance Research, Transplantations issue, 4 artists’ pages, (ed. Phillip Warnell), pub. Routledge.
- Fable, Exhibition Catalogue, Angela Kingston and Gordon Dalton, Chapter Publications, ISBN 1-900029-22-7
- J'en rêve, Exhibition Catalogue, Fondation Cartier pour l'Art Contemporain, ISBN 978-2-7427-5776-3
- The Artist's Yearbook, Ed. Ossian Ward, essay by Zoe Mendelson, pub. Thames & Hudson, editions 2007 and 2008/09, ISBN 978-0-500-28613-5; ISBN 978-0-500-28692-0
