= Cheik Ledy =

Congolese artist

Cheik Ndoluvualu
- Born: 1962 (age 63–64); Kinto M’Vuila, Democratic Republic of Congo
- Died: 1997; Kinshasa
- Occupation: Artist

Cheik Ndoluvualu, called Cheik Ledy (1962–1997), was a Congolese artist. He was born in Kinto M’Vuila, Democratic Republic of Congo.

== Life and career ==
Cheik Ledy was apprenticed to his elder brother, sign painter Chéri Samba, after leaving school in 1977, and worked as Samba's assistant for 10 years in his Kinshasa studio. Like Samba, Ledy’s paintings comment on social and political issues of his day. His more controversial work included sign paintings on condom use and labour. He died of AIDS-related complications in 1997 in Kinshasa.

== Style and themes ==
Ledy's paintings often depict caricatures using bright colors. He worked in the style of sign painting and used French and Lingala texts. Notable works include "Non comprendre" (I Do Not Understand) (1995), "Arrosage" (Watering) (1995), "Absence de morale" (Moral Absence) (1990).

== Exhibitions ==
- JAPANCONGO
- Garage Center of Contemporary Culture, Moscow, Russia
- Musée International de la Croix-Rouge et du Croissant-Rouge
- MAMCO- Musée d’art modern et contemporain, Geneva, Switzerland
- Contemporary African Art Collection- 1990, Jean Pigozzi

== Bibliography ==
- Jean-Pierre Ibio. "Ledy, Cheik" Grove Art Online. Oxford Art Online. Oxford University Press. Web. 7 November 2014. Pigozzi, Jean.
- The Contemporary African Art Collection
- “African Art Now: Masterpieces from the Jean Pigozzi Collection”
- Cheik Ledy, 6 November 2014.
- "Ledy, Cheik (born 1962), painter", Oxford Art Online.
