= Ivry-sur-Seine station =

Railway station in Ivry-sur-Seine, France

Coordinates: 48°48′52″N 2°23′28″E

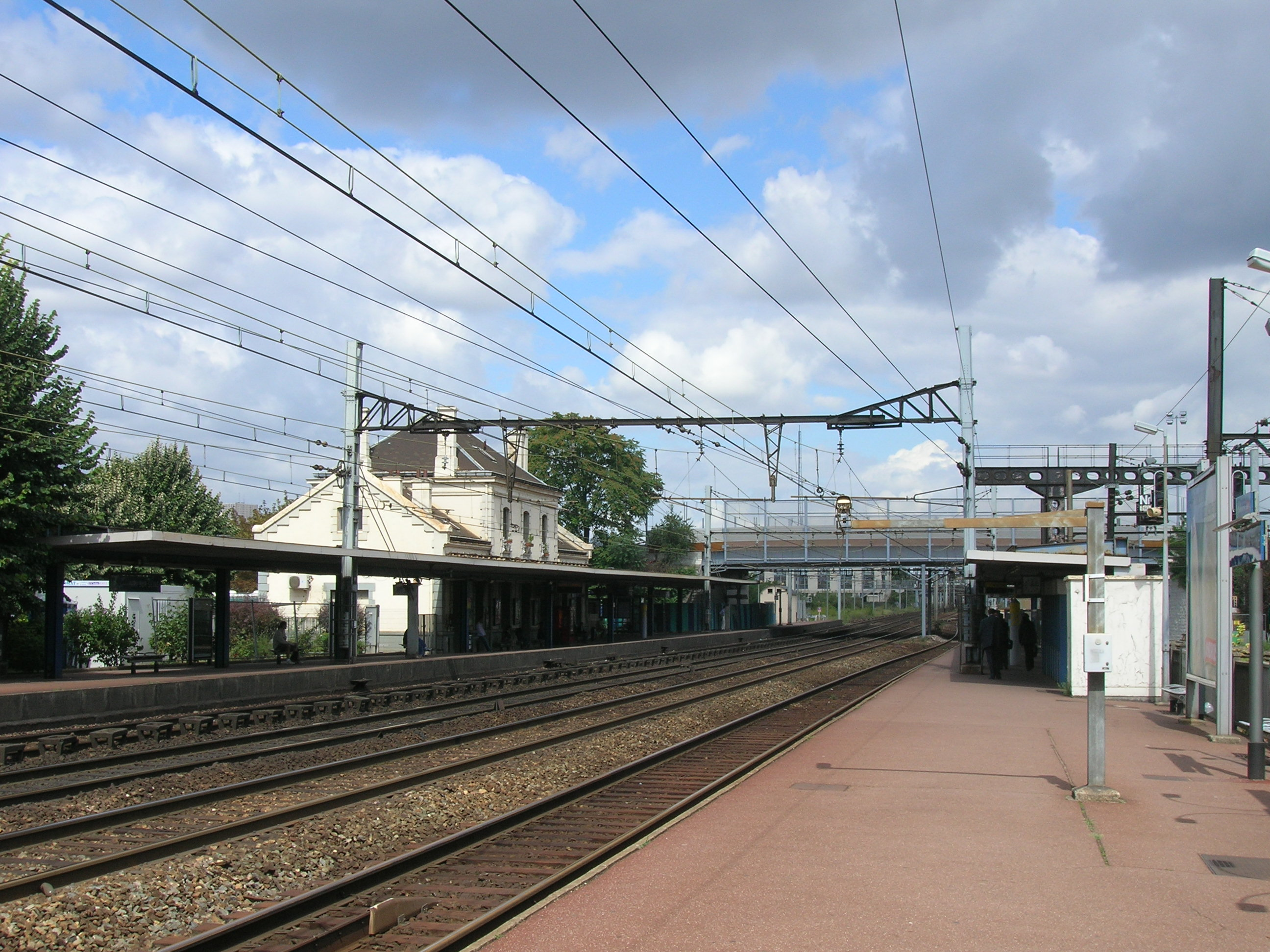
Platforms

Ivry-sur-Seine is a station in Paris' express suburban rail system, the RER. It is situated on the Paris–Bordeaux railway. The station is situated in the eastern side of Ivry-sur-Seine, in Val-de-Marne. Travelers can take RATP bus 125 and 323 to connect between this station and Mairie d'Ivry on Paris Métro Line 7.

== See also ==
- List of stations of the Paris RER

Preceding station	RER	Following station
Bibliothèque François Mitterrand towards Pontoise, Versailles Château Rive Gauche or Saint-Quentin-en-Yvelines	RER C	Vitry-sur-Seine towards Massy-Palaiseau, Dourdan-la-Forêt or Saint-Martin-d'Étampes
