= Peter Harkawik =

American sculptor

- Born: September 23, 1982 (age 44); New York City, NY
- Occupations: Artist, Gallerist

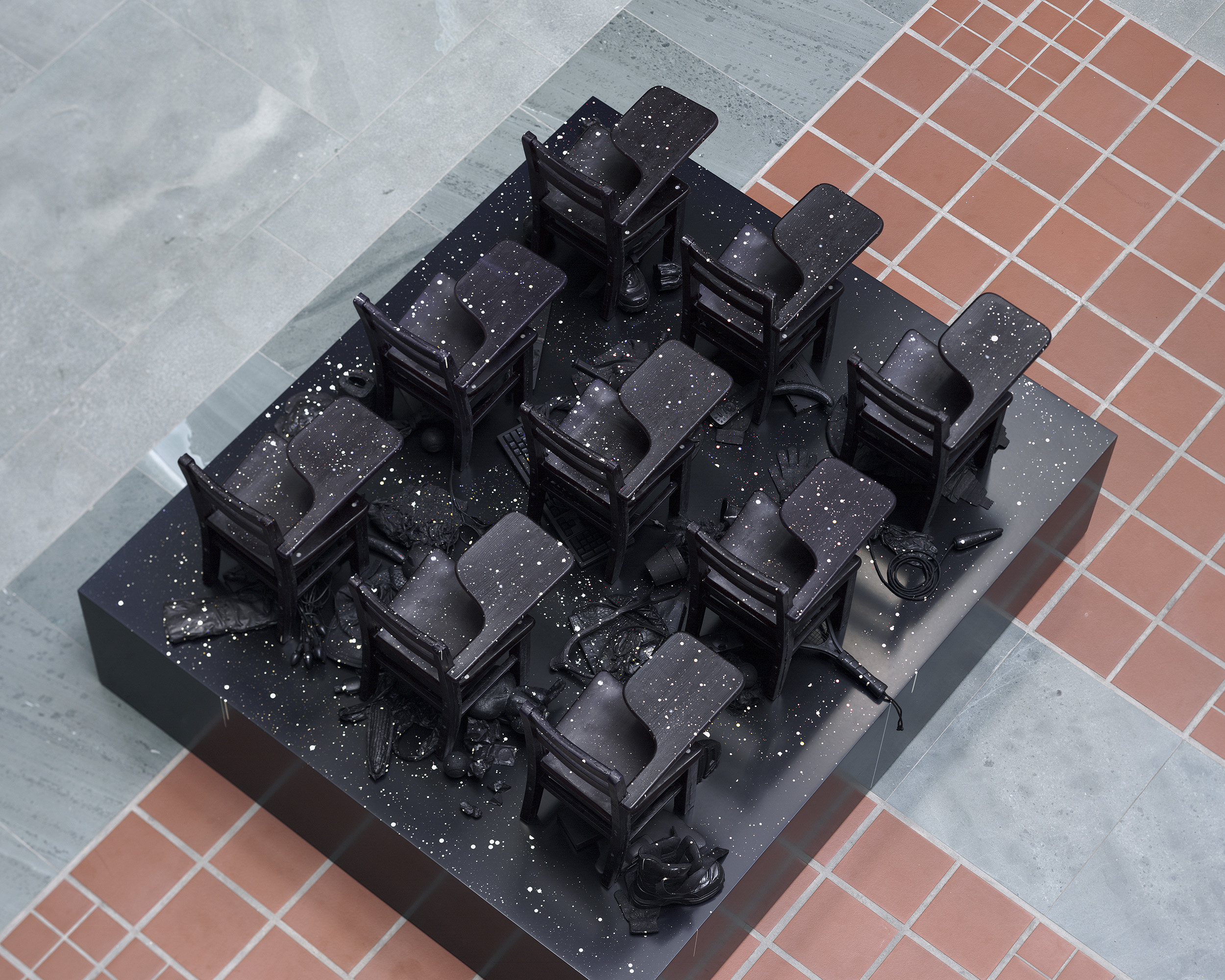
Peter Harkawik, Foundered Planetarium, 2012

Peter Harkawik (born 1982, in New York) is an art dealer, known for directing the gallery Harkawik out of Los Angeles and New York. He is also an artist working in sculpture and photography. His work has been shown in Los Angeles, New York and Paris and is held in several private and public collections. He frequently explores themes of visual perception and intersubjective communication, often drawing from the fields of industrial design and architecture. Writing in the New York Times, Roberta Smith described him as "a younger sort-of painter who favors decals on clear vinyl." He studied at Hampshire College, University of California, San Diego, Skowhegan School of Painting and Sculpture and Yale University. He lives and works in Los Angeles, where he is represented by Thomas Solomon Gallery.

Harkawik's work often contains an unacknowledged temporal component: "For instance, in Harkawik's installation Flesh & Flash (retrofitted) (all works 2010)--a single photograph of the artist's hand gripping a bulbous daikon, the index finger mangled (having once been injured by a belt sander), appeared for weeks to be the work's only component. However, on the final night of the show, Harkawik, adding paint to the photo's surface, introduced a latticelike wooden construction to the wall and a chair to the space, thoughtfully positioned for ideal viewing."

In addition to his studio practice, he has also curated several exhibitions including, in 2011, Touchy Feely, a show exploring connections between visual art and architectural discourse around Critical Regionalism. Critic Geoff Tuck remarked, "Harkawik’s exhibition is subtle and deft, and that the works he has chosen to explore his problematizing of Frampton’s 1983 thesis are beautiful and challenging." In 2010, he moderated a panel discussion on the legacy of typisierung since the Deutscher Werkbund. In 2013, he co-curated exhibitions with Laura Owens at Night Gallery in Los Angeles and at Gavin Brown's enterprise and Venus Over Manhattan in New York.

In October, 2012, Harkawik installed a large-scale wax and plaster sculpture in the downtown Los Angeles Public Library.

== Exhibitions ==
Recent group and solo exhibitions:

2005
J'en rêve, Fondation Cartier pour l'Art Contemporain, Paris, France
2006
Smash and Tickle, 16:1 Gallery, Los Angeles, CA
2007
Origin is the Goal, LACE (curated by Darin Klein), Los Angeles, CA
2008
From Panic to Power, Angstrom Gallery, Los Angeles, CA
Reality Testing, LACE (curated by Victoria Fu), Los Angeles, CA
2009
Whitney's Biennial, curated by Elise Rasmussen, New York, NY
Sculpture/Sabbath, Peter Cooper Park (curated by Jory Rabinowitz), New York, NY
2010
The Way Morning Broke..., Annie Wharton LA, Los Angeles, CA
Three Tall Men, Space 1520 (curated by Ben Lord), Los Angeles, CA
Seven Card Stud, Cherry and Martin, Los Angeles, CA
Stille Post, Kinkead Contemporary, Los Angeles, CA
Hearts of Palm, Night Gallery, Los Angeles, CA
2011
Festival of Lights, Knowmoregames (curated by Jacques Vidal), Brooklyn, NY
Word Salad, Yale University of Art, New Haven, CT
Invagination, Kara Walker Studio, New York, NY
Night Gallery at the Chateau Marmont, Chateau Marmont, Hollywood, CA
2012
Your History is Our History, Praz-Delavallade, Paris, France
Cite Internationale Universitaire de Paris, Paris, France
Summer Selections, Thomas Solomon Gallery, Los Angeles, CA
Foundered Planetarium, Works Cited (curated by Olivian Cha), Los Angeles, CA
2013
NPR Bar, Knowmoregames, Miami, FL
Rose, Cleopatras (curated by Jory Rabinovitz), Brooklyn, NY
Panic Room, Knowmoregames, Brooklyn, NY
Made in Space, Gavin Brown's Enterprise/Venus Over Manhattan, New York, NY
Works Sited, Reprised, Cleopatras (curated by Olivian Cha), Brooklyn, NY
Made in Space, Night Gallery, Los Angeles, CA
