= Charwei Tsai =

Taiwanese artist (born 1980)

- 蔡佳葳
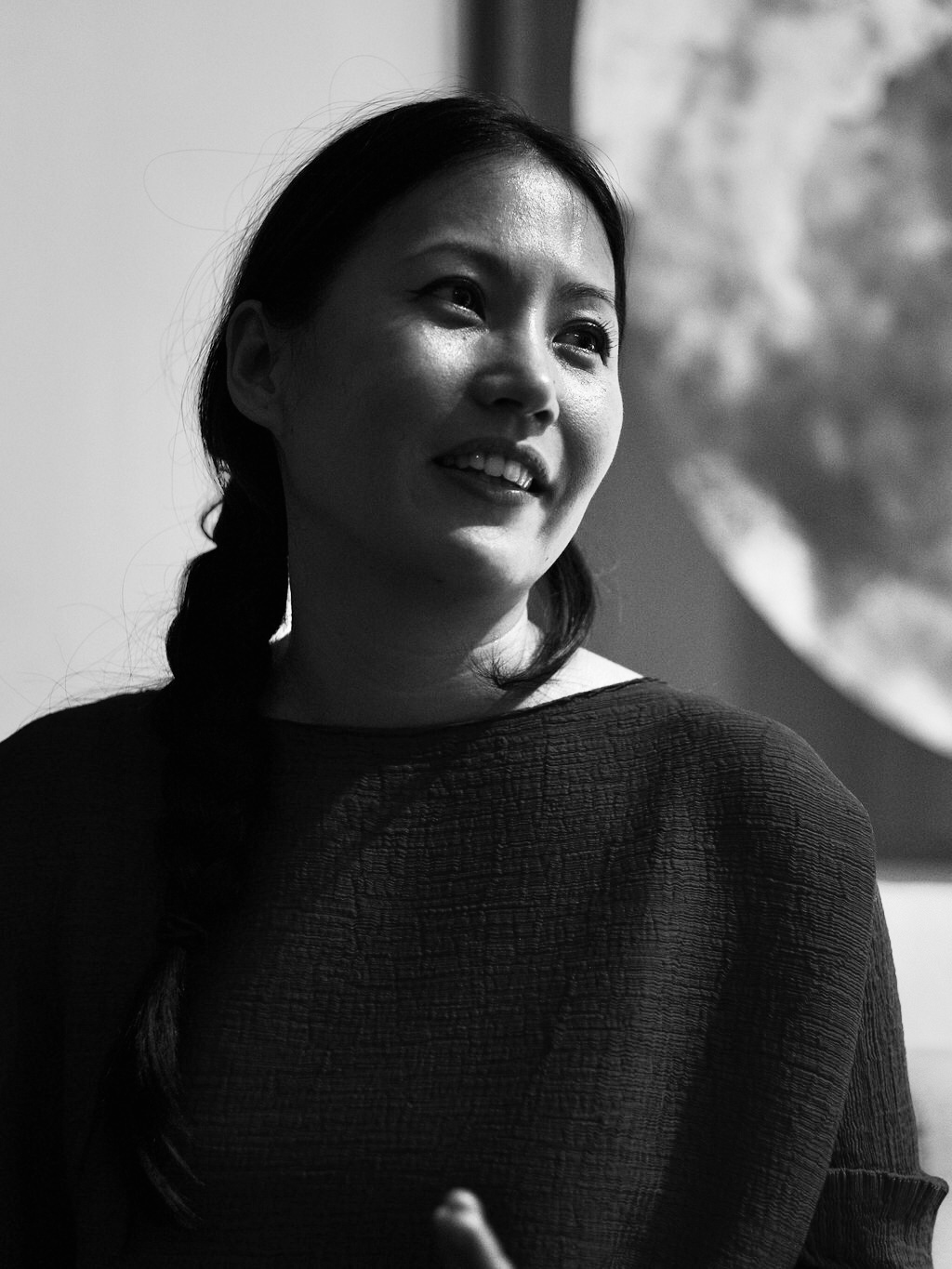
- Charwei Tsai, Taipei, 2018
- Born: October 1, 1980 (age 46); Taipei, Taiwan
- Education: Rhode Island School of Design; École nationale supérieure des Beaux-Arts
- Website: charwei.com

Charwei Tsai (/ˈʃɑːrweɪ ˈtsaɪ/; Chinese: 蔡佳葳; pinyin: Cài Jiāwēi; born 1 October 1980) is a Taiwanese multidisciplinary artist who lives and works in Taipei, Taiwan.

== Biography ==
Tsai was born in 1980 in Taipei, Taiwan. She attended Taipei American School in Taipei, and Stevenson School in Pebble Beach, California. Tsai graduated from Rhode Island School of Design in 2002 with a degree in Industrial Design, and completed a postgraduate research program at the École nationale supérieure des Beaux-Arts in Paris in 2010.

Tsai moved to New York City in 2002. She took a part-time job at Printed Matter, and volunteered at Tibet House, where she grew her interest in Buddhist philosophy. Tsai worked as an assistant in Chinese artist Cai Guo-Qiang's studio in New York from 2004 to 2006. She was also influenced by the earthworks series of artist Robert Smithson.

Tsai has worked as an artist in Taipei, Paris, and Ho Chi Minh City. In 2005, she founded the art journal Lovely Daze. Her work has been widely exhibited in international museums, galleries, biennials, and art fairs.

== Career ==
Tsai's artistic practice has two major themes: an "introspective" method centered on Buddhist philosophy that combines calligraphy, painting, photography, performance and video art; and "social" action documenting indigenous peoples and traditions, marginalized individuals and communities, and environmental and cultural issues.

=== Visual and performance art ===
Tsai does not identify as a religious artist. However, she memorized Buddhist writings in her youth, such as the Heart Sutra, a text often used to practice calligraphy. After moving to New York in 2002, Tsai experimented with writing the sutra on organic materials, starting with flowers. The artist Cai Guo-Qiang encouraged her work, and recommended her for a young artists' exhibition titled J'en rêve (2005) at the Fondation Cartier pour l'Art Contemporain in Paris, where she presented the works Mushroom Mantra, Tofu Mantra, and Iris Mantra.

By writing on ephemeral materials and letting them decay, Tsai sought to express the Buddhist concepts of emptiness and the transient nature of existence. She diversified the writing surfaces in her artwork to include mirrors, photographs, plants, trees, and shells. Tsai wrote the sutra on the seeds, roots, and flowers of a lotus plant and placed them on-site in a temple for the 2006 Singapore Biennial. That same year she created a site-specific work for the Bratsera Hotel in Hydra, Greece, writing on the trunk and branches of an olive tree. In 2009, she wrote the sutra on mushrooms in collaboration with Buddhist monks and nuns for the Asia Pacific Triennial in Brisbane, Australia; and inscribed a text by literary critic Elaine Scarry on flower petals for an installation at the Church of Saint-Séverin in Paris.

In 2011, Tsai created the video installation Ah! in an underground passageway in Singapore, which featured a choir repeating a meditative chant, and a video of the artist writing with ink in water. Her exhibition Meeting Point (Edouard Malingue Gallery, Hong Kong, 2014), alongside Taiwanese artist Wu Chi-Tsung, showed photographs and video of incense burning and becoming ashes. For Plane Tree Mantra (National Museum of Natural History, France, 2014), the artist inscribed the sutra on the bark of a large tree in the Jardin des plantes in Paris.

Tsai participated in the 2016 Biennale of Sydney with an installation in the city's Mortuary Station, which included large incense coils bearing the Hundred Syllable Mantra, and a video work titled Bardo based on the Tibetan Book of the Dead. Bardo was shown at Tsai's solo exhibition Universe of Possibilities (TKG+, Taipei, 2016), which also featured planet-like macro photographs of sea shells discarded from Vietnamese fishing boats.

Tsai's first solo exhibition in the U.K., Bulaubulau (Centre for Chinese Contemporary Art, Manchester, 2018) displayed large pieces of driftwood from Taiwan inscribed with the sutra, and watercolor paintings with the Buddhist text inked on rice paper. Her solo show Root of Desire (TKG+, Taipei, 2018) worked the Vimalakirti Sutra into a series of videos and drawings, and featured a multimedia installation Water Moon (2017).

For the group exhibition The Power of Intention: Reinventing the (Prayer) Wheel (Rubin Museum of Art, New York, 2019), Tsai contributed an ink painting and an installation of spiral incense coils. Tsai joined a multi-generational group exhibition PLUS X (2019) at TKG+, a celebration of the Taipei-based gallery's tenth anniversary.

Tsai's video work Numbers (2020) was commissioned by a human rights art festival on Green Island, Taiwan. In the video, the artist writes numbers in ink on an ice cube which melt away, with a voice-over by the granddaughter of Yang Kui, who was a political prisoner on the island.

Tsai was an online guest lecturer for the "Studio Language" course at Harvard University during the Fall 2020 semester.

In 2021, newly commissioned works by the artist were presented at Live Forever Foundation's Vital Space and the National Taichung Theatre in Taichung City, Taiwan, demonstrating a collaborative approach to making artworks.

=== Filmography ===
Tsai created a series of short films titled Lanyu—Three Stories (2012) about the Tao people native to Orchid Island off the southeastern coast of Taiwan. Lanyu Seascapes describes the externalities of a nuclear waste storage facility on the island, while Shi Na Paradna depicts an elderly man reciting a prayer ritual by the sea, and Hair Dance documents a ceremonial performance by the women of the tribe.

Following the 2015 Nepal Earthquake, Tsai visited the makeshift camps in Kathmandu to reflect on the conditions of the victims in the intervening years, and explored their plight in the short film Songs of Chuchepati Camp (2017), recording the songs and stories of the individuals living there.

Tsai created the video work Hear Her Singing (2017) concerning the refugee situation in the UK, which was commissioned by the Hayward Gallery. Tsai recorded the songs of detainees and asylum seekers at Yarl's Wood Immigration Removal Centre, and held singing workshops with the charity Women for Refugee Women. The final work was shown at the Southbank Centre in London. The film was exhibited in the Taiwan Pavilion curated by Alia Swastika for Biennale Jogja XV.

Tsai filmed songs by foreign boat workers in Taiwan for Songs of Migrant Workers of Kaohsiung Harbor (2018). The three "singing" films from Nepal, the UK, and Taiwan, created with filmmaker Tsering Tashi Gyalthang, are collected in a single work titled Songs We Carry.

Bulaubulau (2018) documents the efforts of an indigenous village in Yilan County, Taiwan to sustainably maintain both tradition and modern life in the face of natural disasters, industrialization, and economic upheaval.

=== Lovely Daze ===
Tsai founded the art journal Lovely Daze, which has published more than ten issues and special editions since 2005. Each issue is dedicated to a single theme related to her work or interests, and presents artwork and writing by other artists rather than reviews or art criticism. Lovely Daze is in the library collections of museums such as MoMA, Tate Modern, the Centre Pompidou, and the Queensland Art Gallery.

== Exhibition ==
=== Selected solo exhibitions ===
- 2018: Root of Desire, TKG+, Taipei, Taiwan
- 2018: Charwei Tsai: Bulaubulau, Centre for Chinese Contemporary Art, Manchester, UK
- 2017: Water Moon, Contemporary Art Institute, Villeurbanne, France
- 2017: Hear Her Singing, Southbank Centre, London, U.K.
- 2017: As It Is, Galerie Mor Charpentier, Paris, France
- 2016: Universe of Possibilities, TKG+, Taipei, Taiwan
- 2014: We Came Whirling Out of Nothingness, TKG+, Taipei, Taiwan
- 2013: Meeting Point: Dual Solo Show of Charwei Tsai and Chi-Tsung Wu, Edouard Malingue Gallery, Hong Kong
- 2012: A Dedication to the Sea, Espace Culturel Louis Vuitton, Singapore
- 2012: A Pilgrimage Through Light & Spells, Galerie Mor Charpentier, Paris, France
- 2011: Elemental Light, TKG+, Taipei, Taiwan
- 2011: My Nature, Deyrolle, Paris, France
- 2011: Ah!, The Esplanade, Singapore
- 2009: Charwei Tsai: Water, Earth and Air, Sherman Contemporary Art Foundation, Sydney, Australia
- 2009: A Dedication to Saint Ursula, Church of Saint Severin, Paris, France
- 2009: Baptism, Church of Saint Severin, Paris, France
- 2009: Charwei Tsai: Transience, Osage Gallery, Hong Kong
- 2008: 7 Ideas in 7 Days, Gallery Sora, Tokyo, Japan

=== Selected group exhibitions ===
- 2019: PLUS X, TKG+, Taipei, Taiwan
- 2019: Biennale Jogja XV, Taiwan Pavilion, Jogjakarta, Indonesia
- 2019: The Power of Intention: Reinventing the (Prayer) Wheel, Rubin Museum of Art, New York, USA
- 2018: Sacred Spaces, Rubin Museum of Art, New York, USA
- 2016: PLUS II, TKG+, Taipei, Taiwan
- 2016: Biennale of Sydney, Mortuary Station, Sydney, Australia
- 2014: Formes Simples, Centre Pompidou-Metz, Metz, France
- 2013: Sharjah Biennial, Sharjah, United Arab Emirates
- 2012: Now Ink II, SH Contemporary, Shanghai, China
- 2012: Phantoms of Asia, Asian Art Museum of San Francisco, USA
- 2012: Trading Futures, Taipei Contemporary Art Center, Taipei, Taiwan
- 2012: Millennium Magazines, Museum of Modern Art, New York, USA
- 2011: Thinking Cool, TKG+, Taipei, Taiwan
- 2011: Yokohama Triennale, Yokohama, Japan
- 2011: Window, TKG+, Taipei, Taiwan
- 2009: 6th Asia Pacific Triennial, Brisbane, Australia
- 2008: Nature Fragile, Museum of Hunting and Nature, Paris, France
- 2008: Traces of the Sacred, Pompidou Center, Paris, France
- 2006: Singapore Biennial, Singapore
- 2005: J'en rêve, Fondation Cartier pour l'Art Contemporain, Paris, France

Tsai is represented by TKG+, Taipei and Mor Charpentier, Paris.
