= Hôtel de Ville, Vitry-sur-Seine =

Town hall in Vitry-sur-Seine, France

Hôtel de Ville
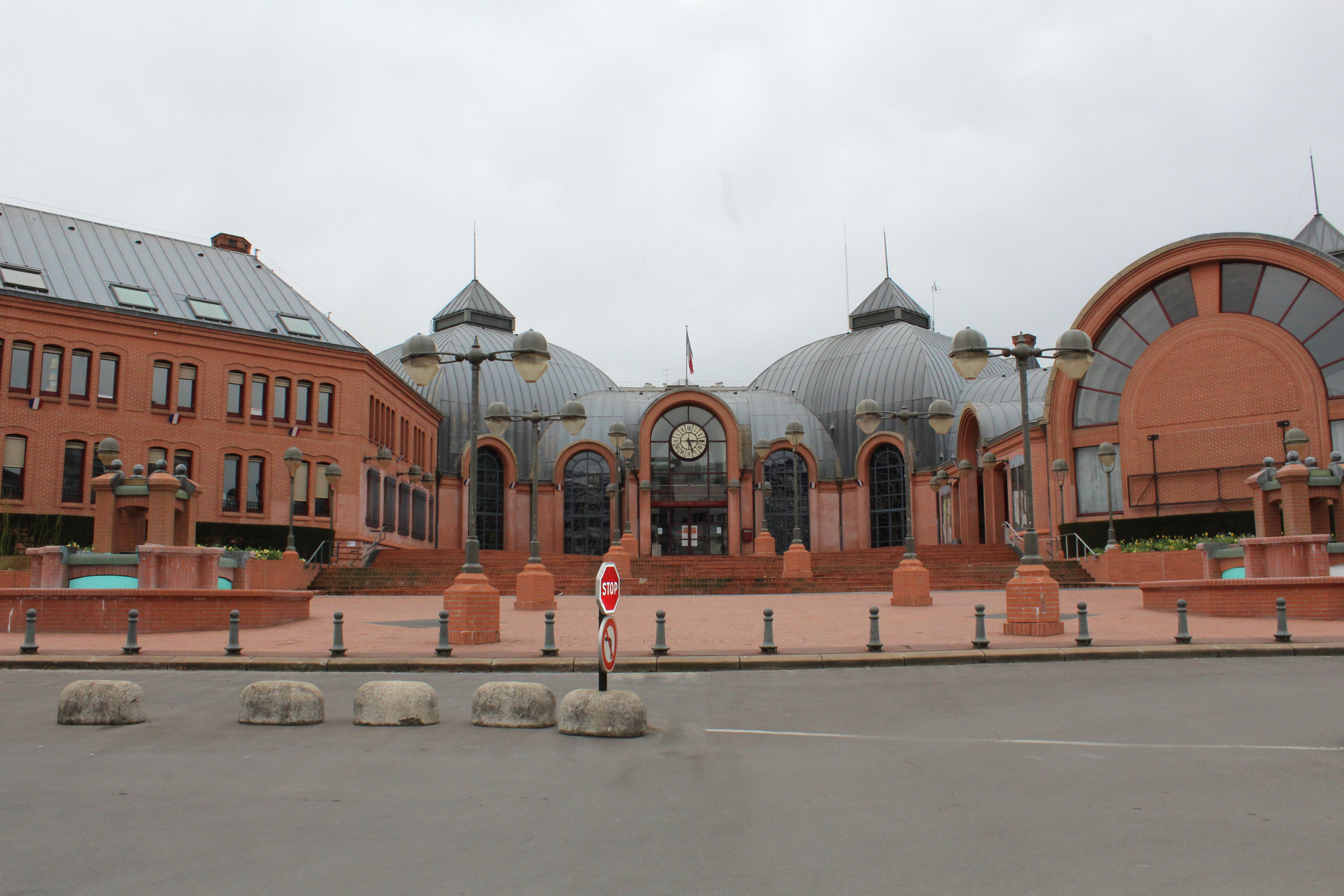
- The main frontage of the Hôtel de Ville in April 2018
- Interactive map of the Hôtel de Ville area

General information
- Type: City hall
- Architectural style: Modern style
- Location: Vitry-sur-Seine, France
- Coordinates: 48.7885°N 2.3884°E
- Completed: 1985

Design and construction
- Architect: François Girard

The Hôtel de Ville (French pronunciation: [otɛl də vil], City Hall) is a municipal building in Vitry-sur-Seine, Val-de-Marne, in the southern suburbs of Paris, France, standing on Avenue Youri Gagarine.

== History ==
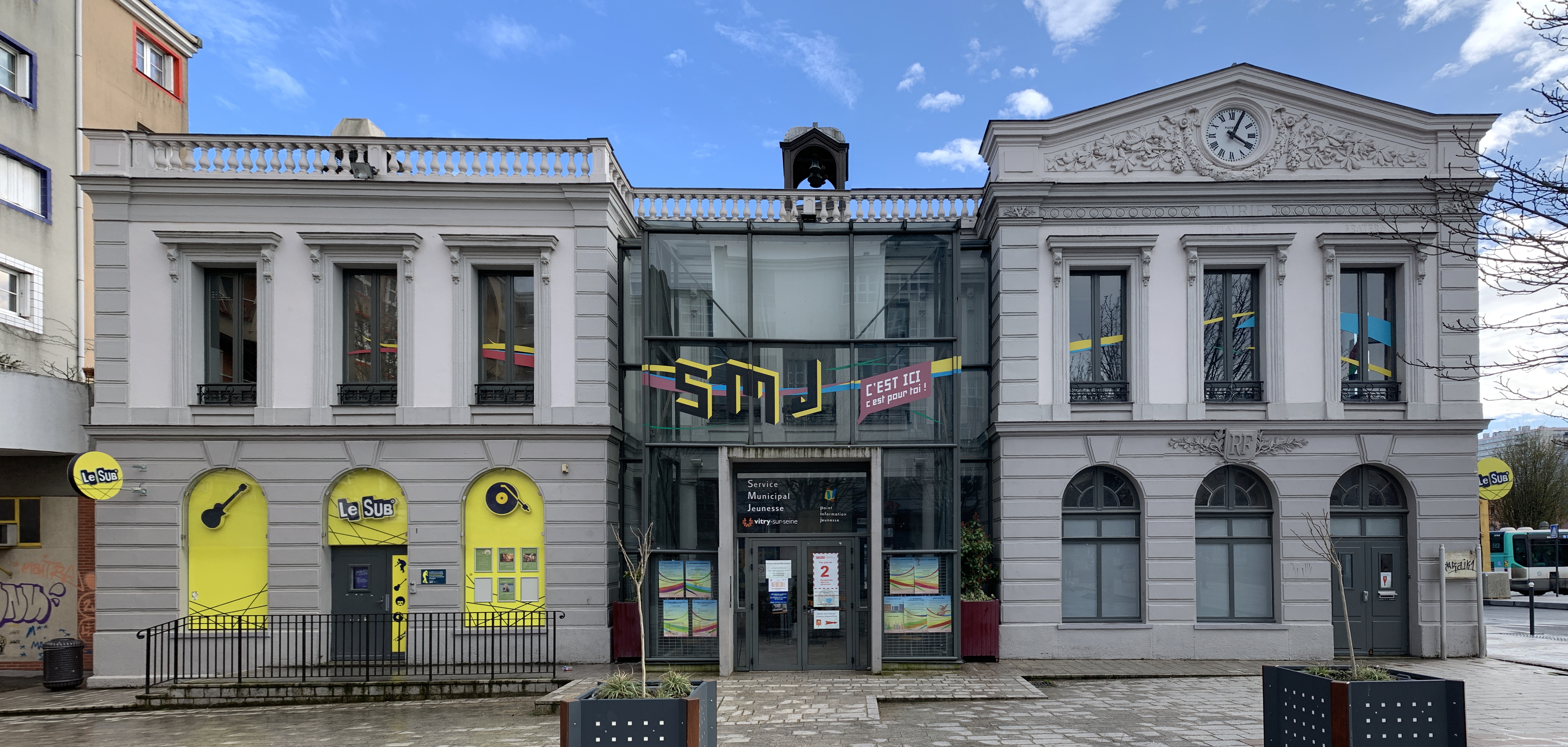
The old town hall

In the mid-19th century, the town council led by the mayor, Pierre Lamouroux, sought a suitable building for use as its town hall. It decided to acquire a private mansion at the corner of Avenue Maximilien-Robespierre and the Avenue de l'Abbé Roger Derry. The mansion was designed in the Louis XIV style, built in ashlar stone and was completed in the 17th century. The building had been owned by Isidore Félicité Lottin de la Gérie, Countess Walsh and the council completed the purchase on 12 March 1853. The design originally involved an asymmetrical main frontage, consisting of two pavilions and a connecting section, facing onto Place Saint-Just. The frontage was improved in 1886, when the two-storey left-hand pavilion was given a balustraded parapet and the single-storey right-hand pavilion was given an extra storey and a pediment with a clock in the tympanum. Then in the 1920s, the connecting section was set back, and given a porch formed by Doric order columns.

During the Paris insurrection on 19 August 1944, part the Second World War, members of the French Resistance, led by Paul Armangot, seized the town hall. German troops briefly regained control and Armangot was shot, but the town was liberated on 25 August 1944.

In the 1960s, following a significant increase in population, the town council decided to commission a modern building. However, slow progress was made over the next twenty years, and several designs were rejected for financial reasons. The site they selected was on the corner of Avenue Lucien-Français and Avenue Youri-Gagarine. The foundation stone for the new building was laid on 28 May 1983. It was designed by François Girard in the modern style, built in red brick and was officially opened by the mayor, Paul Mercieca, on 30 November 1985.

The complex was laid out in the shape of four octagons connected by a central block. The design involved an asymmetrical main frontage, arranged around a small courtyard, facing onto Avenue Youri-Gagarine. The left hand forward octagon featured a canted front fenestrated by a series of small segmented windows on two floors, while the right hand forward octagon featured a huge arch containing a semi-circular brick panel surrounded by glass voussoirs. The central section featured five round headed openings: the middle opening, which was larger than the others, contained a glass door with a clock above, while the other openings contained leaded glass. The four octagons were surmounted by zinc domes. Internally, the principal rooms included a long entrance hall, which connected the four octagons and featured eight stained glass murals, created by the painter, Valerio Adami, and manufactured by the glassmaker, Jacques Loire. They also included the Salle du Conseil (council chamber), which featured a mural by Jean-Pierre Yvaral depicting Marianne, and the Salle des Mariages (wedding hall), which featured a mural by Ernest Pignon-Ernest depicting two hands clasped together.

Meanwhile the old town hall was placed on rafts and dragged 19 metres (62 ft) to the northeast, to facilitate the construction of the Route Nationale 305 along Avenue Maximilien-Robespierre, in June 1986. It reopened as La Maison de la Jeunesse, providing support for young people, on 10 June 1989.
