= Vitry-sur-Seine station =

Railway station in Vitry-sur-Seine, France

Coordinates: 48°48′2″N 2°24′8″E

Vitry-sur-Seine is a station in Paris's express suburban rail system, the RER. It is on the Paris–Bordeaux railway. It serves the commune of Vitry-sur-Seine, in the Val-de-Marne department.

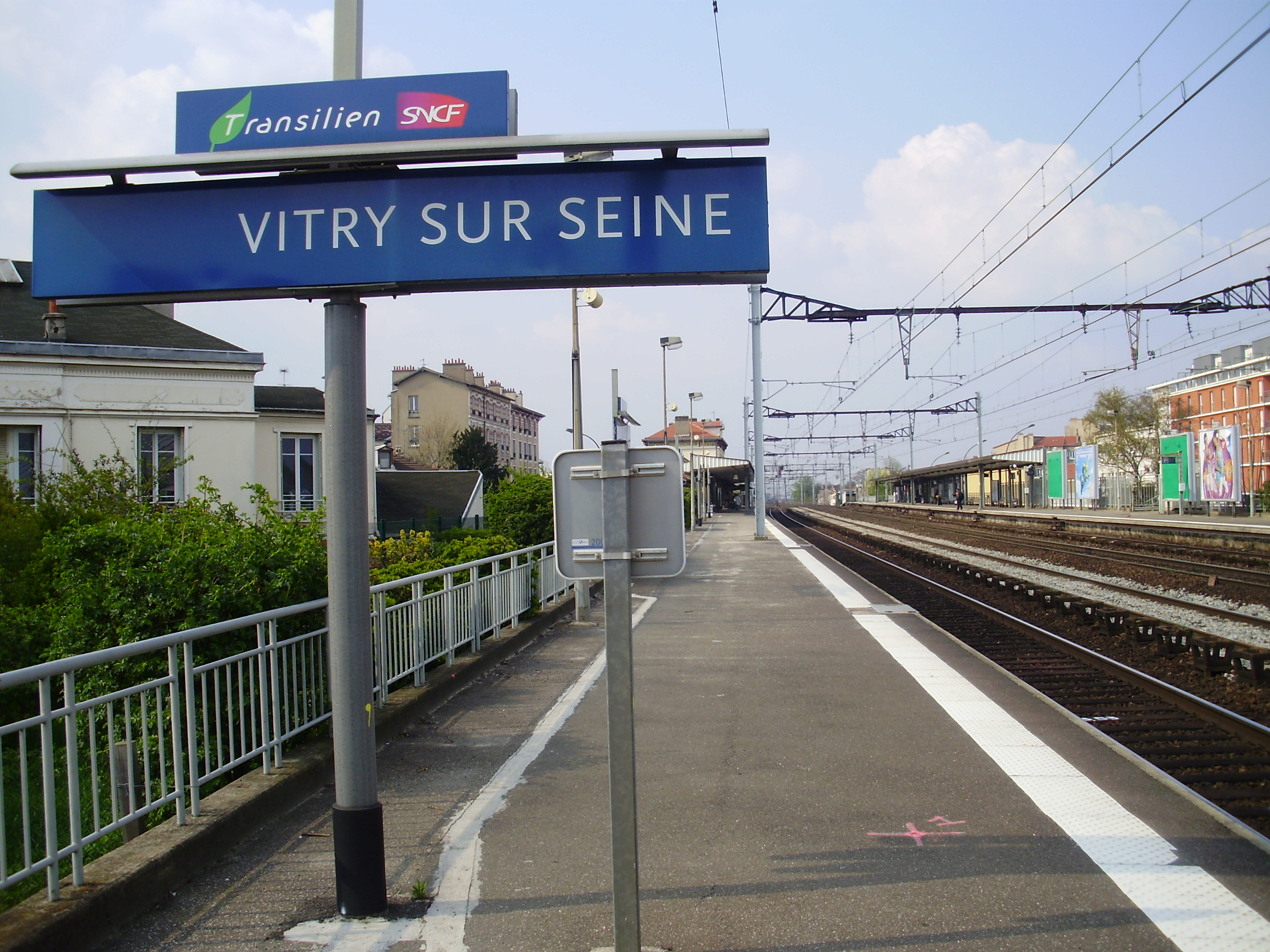

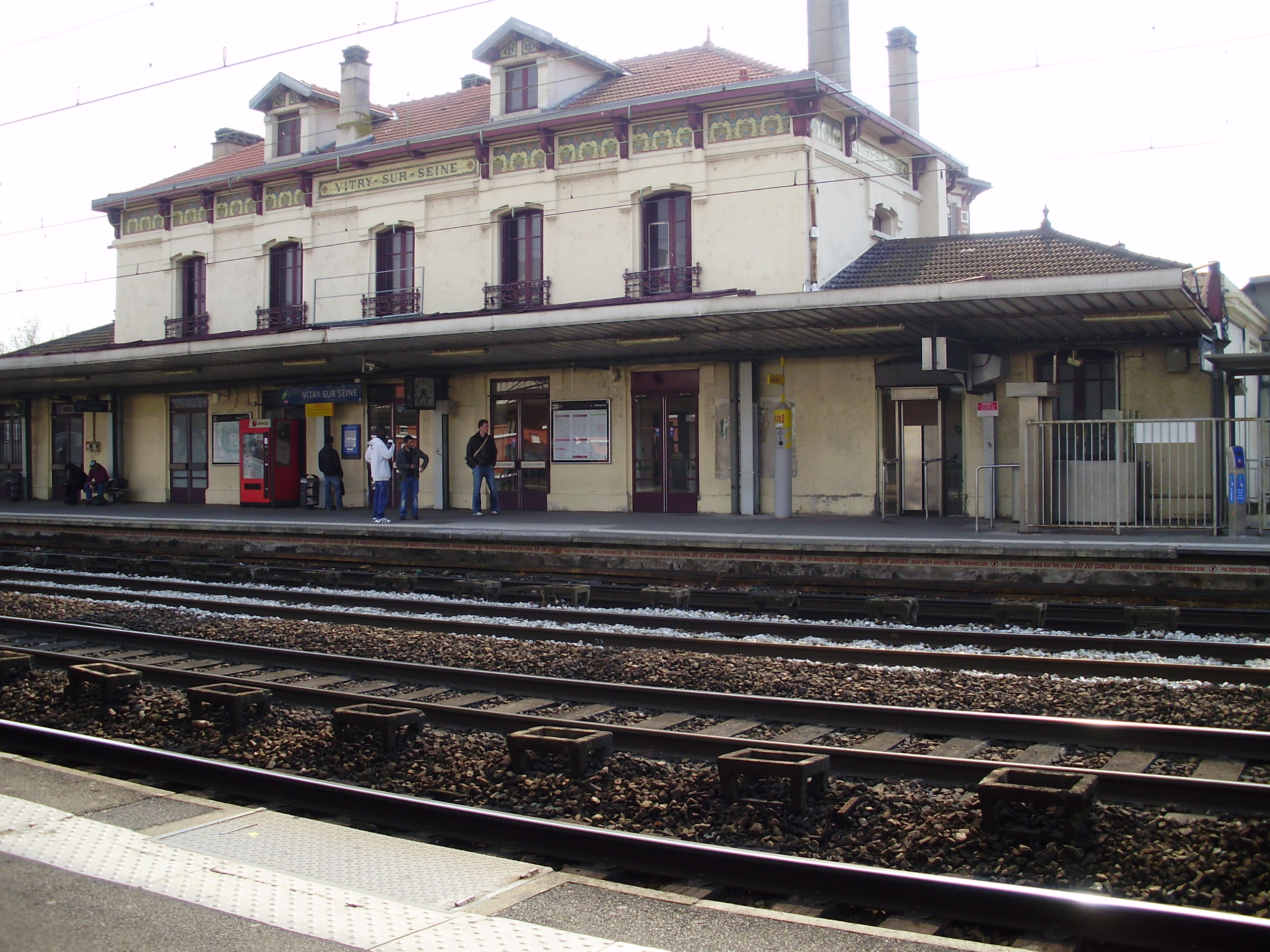

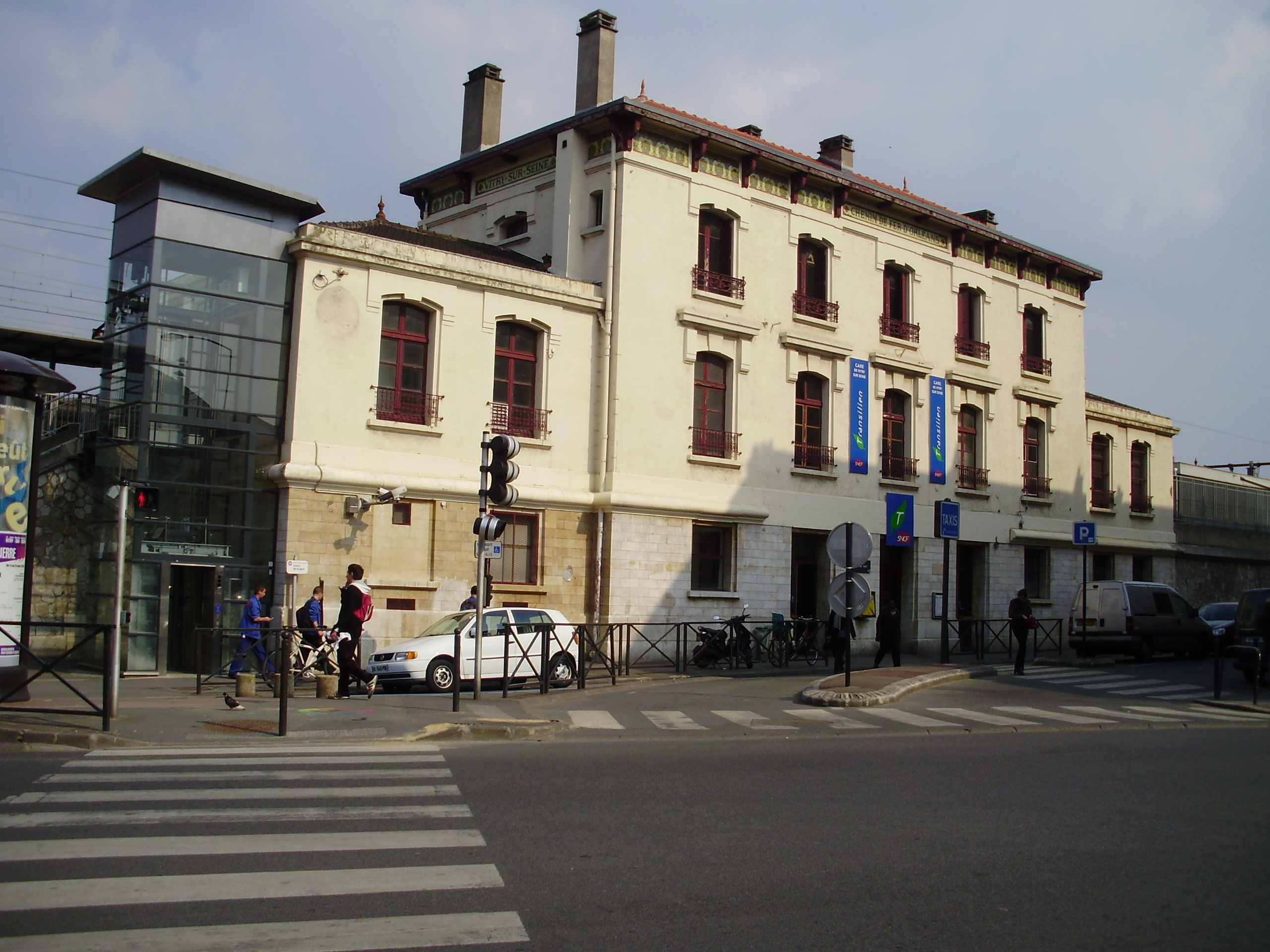

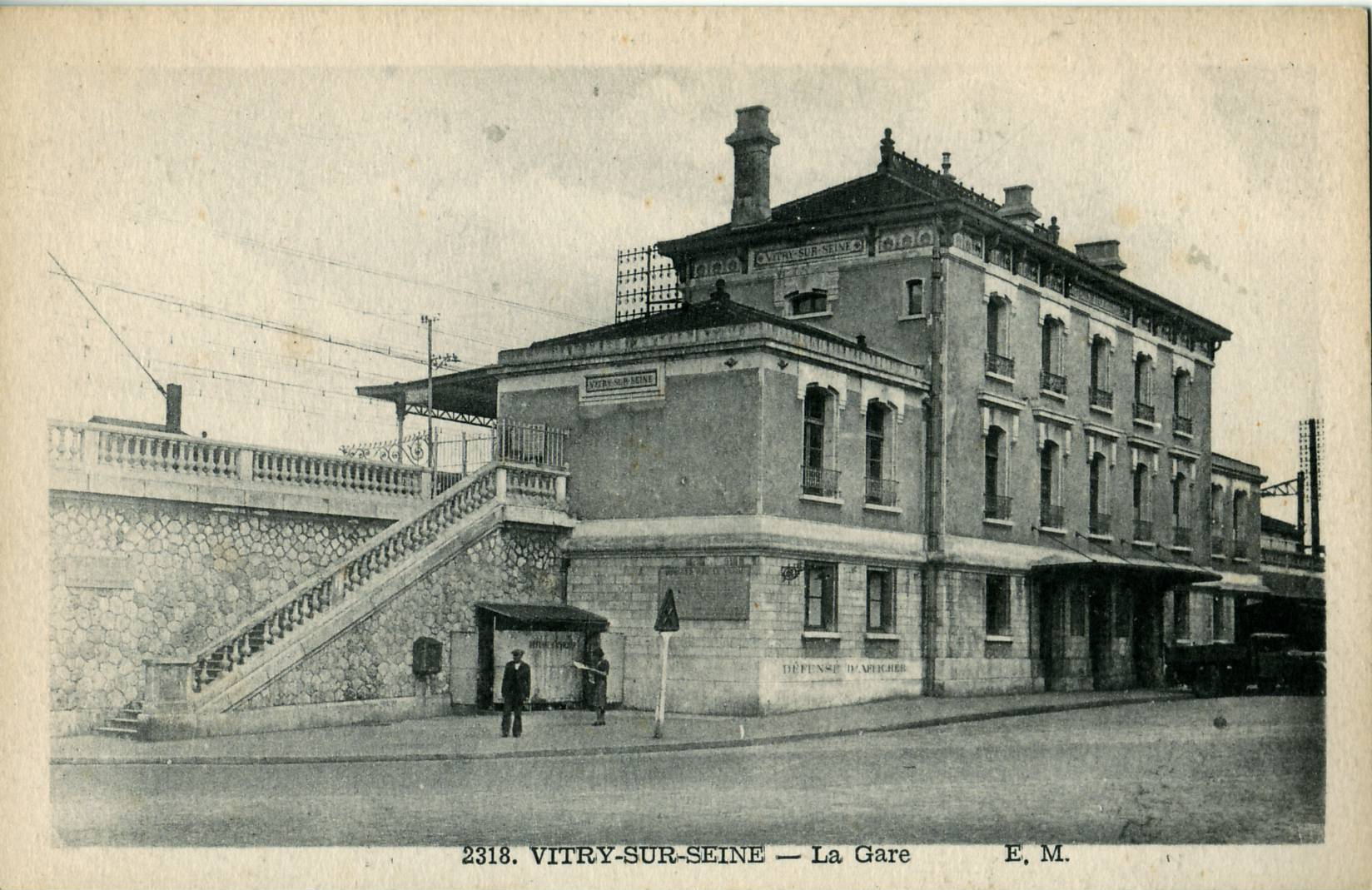

== See also ==
- List of stations of the Paris RER

Preceding station	RER	Following station
Ivry-sur-Seine towards Pontoise, Versailles Château Rive Gauche or Saint-Quentin-en-Yvelines	RER C	Les Ardoines towards Massy-Palaiseau, Dourdan-la-Forêt or Saint-Martin-d'Étampes
