= Vitry-sur-Seine =

Commune in Île-de-France, France

- Commune
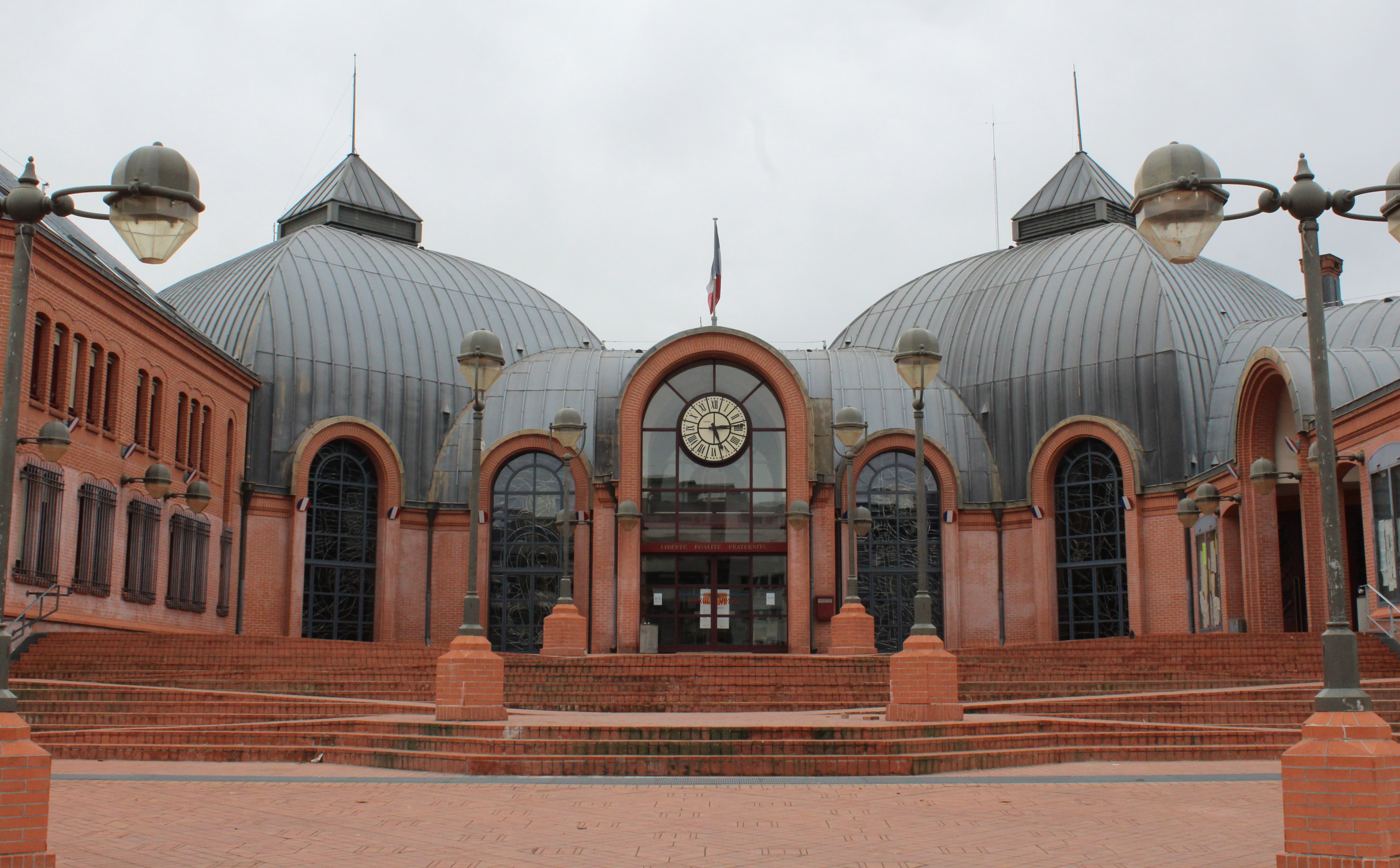
- The Hôtel de Ville

- Coat of arms

- Location (in red) within Paris inner suburbs
- Location of Vitry-sur-Seine
- Location within France Location within Île-de-France (region)
- Coordinates: 48°47′15″N 2°23′34″E
- Country: France
- Region: Île-de-France
- Department: Val-de-Marne
- Arrondissement: L'Haÿ-les-Roses
- Canton: Vitry-sur-Seine-1 and 2
- Intercommunality: Grand Paris

Government
  - Mayor (2026–32): Pierre Bell-Lloch (PCF)
- Area^{1}: 11.67 km^{2} (4.51 sq mi)
- Population (2023): 93,963
  - Density: 8,052/km^{2} (20,850/sq mi)
- Demonym: Vitriots
- Time zone: UTC+01:00 (CET)
  - Summer (DST): UTC+02:00 (CEST)
- INSEE/Postal code: 94081 /94400
- Website: www.vitry94.fr
- ^{1} French Land Register data, which excludes lakes, ponds, glaciers > 1 km^{2} (0.386 sq mi or 247 acres) and river estuaries.

Vitry-sur-Seine (French pronunciation: [vitʁi syʁ sɛn]; lit. 'Vitry-on-Seine') or simply Vitry is a commune in the southeastern suburbs of Paris, France, 7.5 km (4.7 mi) from the centre of Paris.

== Name ==
Vitry-sur-Seine was originally called simply Vitry. The name Vitry comes from Medieval Latin Vitriacum, and before that Victoriacum, meaning "estate of Victorius", a Gallo-Roman landowner. In 1897 the name of the commune officially became Vitry-sur-Seine (meaning "Vitry upon Seine"), in order to distinguish it from other communes of France also called Vitry.

== Main sights ==
The Hôtel de Ville, which opened in 1985, is on Avenue Youri Gagarine, and the Musée d'Art Contemporain du Val-de-Marne, which opened in 2005, is on Place de la Libération.

== Culture ==
For some years, Vitry-sur-Seine operated a cultural policy of bringing art to all. For this reason, the commune contains over 100 contemporary sculptures, notably in establishments of public education (schools, secondary schools and High Schools).

Vitry hosts the Musée d'Art Contemporain du Val-de-Marne (Val-de-Marne's Museum of Contemporary Art). Opened on 18 November 2005, this museum offers in addition to the workshops of plastic arts, an auditorium and a cinema for art and experimental film.

Vitry is one of the cities that contributed to the development of the Hip hop movement in France. Consequentially, urban art has a very important place in the city

== Transport ==
Vitry-sur-Seine is served by two stations on Paris RER line C: Vitry-sur-Seine and Les Ardoines.

Orly Airport is located near Vitry-sur-Seine.

== Demographics ==
The city can be separated into three distinct parts: the center containing numerous cités HLM (Housing projects), peripheral neighborhoods belonging to the middle class, and a large industrial area along the Seine river.

The bordering towns are Ivry-sur-Seine, Villejuif, Chevilly-Larue, Thiais, Choisy-le-Roi, Alfortville.

With about 94,000 inhabitants. Vitry-sur-Seine is the seventh most populated city of Île-de-France. The rate of unemployment is 26.5%, while national average is under 10%.

Historical population

Year	Pop.	±% p.a.
1793	3,025	—
1800	2,018	−5.62%
1806	2,100	+0.67%
1821	1,956	−0.47%
1831	2,188	+1.13%
1836	2,079	−1.02%
1841	2,506	+3.81%
1846	2,831	+2.47%
1851	2,559	−2.00%
1856	2,600	+0.32%
1861	3,095	+3.55%
1866	3,745	+3.89%
1872	3,758	+0.06%
1876	4,155	+2.54%
1881	5,284	+4.92%
1886	6,122	+2.99%
1891	7,161	+3.18%
1896	8,010	+2.27%
1901	9,894	+4.32%

Year	Pop.	±% p.a.
1906	11,497	+3.05%
1911	14,969	+5.42%
1921	21,492	+3.68%
1926	31,355	+7.85%
1931	41,919	+5.98%
1936	46,945	+2.29%
1946	44,058	−0.63%
1954	52,540	+2.23%
1962	64,409	+2.58%
1968	77,846	+3.21%
1975	87,316	+1.65%
1982	85,263	−0.34%
1990	82,400	−0.43%
1999	78,908	−0.48%
2007	83,650	+0.73%
2012	88,102	+1.04%
2017	93,557	+1.21%
2023	93,963	+0.07%

Source: EHESS and INSEE (1968-2023)

=== Immigration ===
Place of birth of residents of Vitry-sur-Seine in 1999
Born in metropolitan France	Born outside metropolitan France			
72.9%	27.1%			
72.9%	Born in overseas France	Born in foreign countries with French citizenship at birth^{1}	EU-15 immigrants^{2}	Non-EU-15 immigrants
72.9%	2.7%	2.7%	5.9%	15.8%
^{1} This group is made up largely of former French settlers, such as pieds-noirs in Northwest Africa, followed by former colonial citizens who had French citizenship at birth (such as was often the case for the native elite in French colonies), as well as to a lesser extent foreign-born children of French expatriates. A foreign country is understood as a country not part of France in 1999, so a person born for example in 1950 in Algeria, when Algeria was an integral part of France, is nonetheless listed as a person born in a foreign country in French statistics.^{2} An immigrant is a person born in a foreign country not having French citizenship at birth. An immigrant may have acquired French citizenship since moving to France, but is still considered an immigrant in French statistics. On the other hand, persons born in France with foreign citizenship (the children of immigrants) are not listed as immigrants.

As of circa 1998 Ivry-sur-Seine and Vitry had a combined Asian population of 3,600. That year about 250 Asians from those communes worked in the 13th arrondissement of Paris, and the overall demographics of Ivry and Vitry Asians were similar to those in the 13th arrondissement.

== Administration ==
Vitry is divided into two cantons (districts):

- Vitry-sur-Seine-1 counts 46,849 inhabitants (as of 2014)
- Vitry-sur-Seine-2 counts 44,339 inhabitants (as of 2014)

== Cités (Housing projects) ==
- Cité Balzac
- Cité Du Colonel Fabien
- Lucien Français
- Les Marronniers
- La Sablière 200
- La Commune de Paris
- Mario Capra
- Les Montagnards
- Les Montagnes (La Vanoise, Pelvoux, Annapurna)
- La Tourraine
- Le Mail
- Le Moulin Vert
- Les Toits et Joie
- Gabriel Peri
- Cité Robespierre
- Cité Barbusse
- Le Square de l'Horloge
- Cité Camille Groult
- Les Malassis
- Rouget de l'isle
- La Glacière
- Cité Bourgogne
- Cité Verte
- Cité Bleu (Camille Blanc)
- Cité des Combattants
- Roger Derry
- Rosenberg
- Cité des Peupliers-Manouchians
- La Semise
- Couzy

== Education ==
As of 2016 the commune has 23 preschools (maternelles), and 21 elementary schools, with a combined total of 9,000 students.

- Public junior high schools (collèges): Danielle-Casanova, Adolphe-Chérioux, Lakanal, Gustave-Monod, and Collège Jules-Valles
  - In addition Collège Romain-Rolland in Ivry-sur-Seine serves a portion of Vitry-sur-Seine
- Senior high schools: Lycée Adolphe-Chérioux, Lycée Camille-Claudel, and Lycée Jean-Macé
  - Lycée Romain-Rolland is in adjacent Ivry-sur-Seine
- Private junior-senior high school: Collège-lycée privé Epin

Paris 12 Val de Marne University is the area university.

== Twin towns – sister cities ==
Vitry-sur-Seine is twinned with:

- Burnley, England, United Kingdom (1958)
- Kladno, Czech Republic (1966)
- Meissen, Germany (1973)

== Notable people ==
- 113, rap group
- Jimmy Briand, footballer
- Cédric Bakambu, footballer
- Sohane Benziane, murder victim
- Cerrone, musician
- Raymond Cordy, actor
- Damien Dovy, karateka
- Jean Dréville, film director
- Daniel Duval, film actor, director, writer
- Squeezie, youtuber
- David Fleurival, footballer
- Dorian Godon, professional cyclist
- Mickaël Hanany, athlete
- Marc Johnson, artist
- Jimmy Kébé, footballer
- Ritchie Makuma Mpasa, footballer
- Richard Massolin, footballer
- Doudou Masta, rapper
- Maé-Bérénice Méité, figure skater
- Jérémy Menez, footballer
- Maguy Nestoret, athlete
- Rohff, rapper
- Arsène Tchakarian, French-Armenian historian and resistance fighter
- Lassana Touré, basketball player

== See also ==
- Communes of the Val-de-Marne department
- Ary Bitter
