= Bodys Isek Kingelez =

Congolese sculptor and artist (1948 – 2015)

Bodys Kingelez
- Born: Jean-Baptiste; 1948; Kimbembele-Ihunga, Belgian Congo
- Died: 14 March 2015 (aged 66); Kinshasa, Democratic Republic of Congo
- Education: Self-taught
- Known for: Sculpture
- Patrons: Jean Marc Patras

Bodys Isek Kingelez or Jean Baptiste (1948 – 14 March 2015) was a Congolese sculptor and artist known for his models of fantastic cities, made of cardboard, paper, tape and other commonplace materials. His work has been presented in numerous exhibitions around the globe, including exhibitions at the Centre Georges Pompidou in Paris and the Museum of Modern Art in New York and at the documenta XI in Kassel.

== Biography ==
Kingelez was born the oldest of nine siblings in Kimbembele-Ihunga, Democratic Republic of Congo (what was then the Belgian Congo.) After graduating from secondary school he moved to Kinshasa in 1970. Until 1977 he studied part-time and supported himself by teaching at a school. He was hired by the National Museum in Kinshasa as an art restorer, particularly in the restoration of African masks, until 1985 where he began to pursue the sculpture-centric practice he would later be known for full time.

During his lifetime he did not have a commercial art dealer to represent his work. He died in 2015 as a result of cancer.

== Work ==
Kinshasa la Belle (1991)[63 × 55 × 80 cm]

Kingelez is known primarily for his models of fantastic and utopian cities made of scrap materials like cardboard, paper and plastic; these models depict an idealistic vision of society that contrasts our harsh reality and dually a statement against the widespread construction funded by The World Bank in collaboration with corrupt African regimes. He sought to establish a fairy-tale world in his work that reflected his inner fantasies and ideals he had envisioned for reality that would be open for all to explore; as Sarah Suzuki, curator at the Museum of Modern Art New York, has said: Kingelez's work creates "a place of optimism, a place of beauty... That feels very welcome."

Kimbembele Ihunga (1994)[130 × 185 × 320 cm]

Kingelez has called his art extrêmes maquettes (English: extreme models), and has said about his artistic approach: “I make this most deeply imaginary, meticulous and well considered work with the aim of having more influence over life. As a black artist I must set a good example by receiving the light which pure art, this vital human instrument, kindles for the sake of all. Thanks to my deep hope for a happy tomorrow, I strive to better my quality, and the better becomes the wonderful. I exhibit a mode of expression which fits me like a glove, and I point out that I am another artist.”

Kingelez created more than 300 models, starting with individual architectural structures. In 1992 he began to assemble entire cities with numerous buildings, avenues, parks, stadiums and monuments. His first model of a city was called Kimbembele-Ihunga after the village where he was born. He described his process as firstly devising a name for each new project which helped to cultivate ideas and from there he would dive straight into fabrication.

Notable works of Kingelez include Ville Fantôme ("Phantom City," 1996) Kin 3ème millénaire ("Kinshasa: Project for the Third Millennium," 1997) and La Ville du Futur ("City of the Future," 2000).

== Exhibitions ==
Ville Fantôme (1996)[120 × 570 × 240 cm]

In 1989 he was invited to Paris to present his work at the Centre Georges Pompidou in the exhibition Les Magiciens de la Terre curated by Jean-Hubert Martin and supported by The Contemporary African Art Collection (CAAC) of Jean Pigozzi.

In 2010 he showed his project Ville Fantôme at the Centre Pompidou, Paris in a solo exhibition titled Dreamlands.

His work was presented in the retrospective exhibition Bodys Isek Kingelez: City Dreams in 2018 at the Museum of Modern Art, New York. alongside a VR recreation of the Ville Fantôme project created in collaboration with German artist Carsten Höller

== Collections ==
Kingelez's work is in the Jean Pigozzi collection, the Musée International des Arts Modestes (MIAM) collection in Sète, France, the Cartier Foundation in Paris and the Ludwig Foundation in Cologne.

== Bibliography ==
- Kingelez, Bodys Isek; Yilmaz Dziewior (September 2001). Bodys Isek Kingelez. Hatje Cantz. ISBN 3-7757-1054-X.
- Serageldin, Ismail; Bodys Isek Kingelez (November 1993). Home and the World. Museum for African Art. ISBN 3-7913-1326-6.
- Subiros, Pep (2001). Africas: The Artist and the City. Centre de Cultura Contemporània de Barcelona. ISBN 84-95273-86-1.
- Kingelez, Bodys Isek; Haus der Kulturen der Welt GmbH (1992). Bodys Isek Kingelez Künstler der Welt. Haus der Kulturen der Welt GmbH and Edition Cantz, Stuttgart. ISBN 3-89322-307-X.
