= Marc Johnson (artist) =

French–Beninese visual artist, filmmaker, and architect

- Born: 1986 (age 39–40); Vitry-sur-Seine, France
- Education: École nationale supérieure des Beaux-Arts
- Website: marcjohnson.fr

Marc Johnson is a French–Beninese visual artist, filmmaker, and architect.

== Early life and education ==
Johnson was born in Vitry-sur-Seine, France, in 1986. From 2006 to 2011, he studied at the École nationale supérieure des Beaux-Arts (ENSBA) in Paris. During this period, he completed exchange programs at Hunter College in New York City (2009–2010) and at the Hangzhou Academy of Art in China. From 2011 to 2013, Johnson studied architecture at the École Nationale Supérieure d’Architecture Paris-Malaquais.

== Career ==
Johnson began exhibiting his work in the early 2010s. His 2014 short film, YúYú, was selected for the Berlin International Film Festival in 2015 and was part of The Yvonne Rainer Project at Galerie Nationale du Jeu de Paume in Paris, an exhibition curated by Chantal Pontbriand. In 2016, the film won the Best Short Film Award at the Las Palmas International Film Festival. In 2017, the Jan Shrem and Maria Manetti Shrem Museum of Art at UC Davis presented YúYú as a solo exhibition in collaboration with the Kramlich Collection. Also in 2017, Johnson exhibited Rite of Spring at the 3CHA art center in Châteaugiron and the installation fecund lacuna: art, archaeology, genetics at La Maréchalerie in Versailles. In 2020, Johnson presented YúYú at the Centre Pompidou as part of the Fast Forward section of China Africa: Crossing the World Color Line.

The book associated with the fecund lacuna project, titled fecund lacuna / lacune féconde (2017), won the Cornish Family Prize for Art and Design Publishing. His 2017 short film, Ultraviolet, premiered at the Sundance Film Festival in 2018 and received the Honorable mention for Best Experimental Short at the Milwaukee Film Festival the same year. Johnson's work was also shown at the Moscow International Biennale for Young Art in 2017 and 2018 and at venues including the Centre National Édition Art Image (CNEAI) and Ginza Maison Hermès. In 2024, Galerie Mitterrand in Paris held a solo exhibition of his series The Sea is History (After Derek Walcott).

== Selected exhibitions ==
=== Solo ===
- 2024: Galerie Mitterand, The Sea is History (After Derek Walcott), Paris, France
- 2017: YuYu, Manetti-Shrem Museum of Art, UC Davis, in collaboration with the Kramlich Collection, United States
- 2017: Rite of Spring, 3 CHA Centre for Contemporary Art, Châteaugiron, France
- 2016: fecund lacuna: art, archaeology, genetics, La Maréchalerie Centre for Contemporary Art, Versailles, France
- 2016: Videorama, Werkleitz Gesellschaft e.V. – Zentrum für Medienkunst, Germany

=== Group ===
- 2025: Kulturnatt Stockholm 2025, Bromska palatset, La Résidence de France, le Palais Broms, Sweden
- 2024: Liljevalchs Konsthall, The Stockholm Cosmology, Stockholm, Sweden
- 2024: Art Paris Art Fair, Fragile Utopias: A Focus on the French Scene, Galerie Mitterrand, Grand Palais Éphémère – Champ-de-Mars, Paris, France
- 2022: Ghosts of the Machine, screening program, The Polygon Gallery, Vancouver, Canada
- 2020: Manifesta 13, Les Parallèles du Sud, Marseille, France
- 2018: Abracadabra!, 6th Moscow International Biennale for Young Art, Curator: Moscow, Russia
- 2018: OLHO, Museo de Arte Moderna, Curator: Vanina Saracino, Rio de Janeiro, RJ, Brazil
- 2017: ATM tempo I/II/III, Ginza Maison Hermès Le Forum, Tokyo, Japan
- 2016: constellation•s, new ways of living in the world, arc en rêve centre d’architecture, Bordeaux, France
- 2016: Deep Inside, 5th Moscow International Biennale for Young Art, Moscow, Russia
- 2015: trans(¿)duction, CNEAI= Centre National Edition Art Image, Chatou, France
- 2014: The Yvonne Rainer Project, Jeu de Paume, Paris, France
- 2010: Ligne of chance, Fondation d'entreprise Ricard, France

== Books ==
- Johnson, Marc, Dana Claxton, Stan Douglas, Ian Wallace, Peter Morin, Anthony Shelton and al., Parley: How would you feel about being denied the opportunity to speak your ancestral language? Edited by Marc Johnson, Vancouver Biennale and Stockholm University of the Arts, 2024.
- Marc Johnson, Eric Crubezy, and al. Fecund lacuna: Art, Archaeology, Genetics, Analogues & La Maréchalerie, 2016.
