= Lassana Touré =

French basketball player

Lassana Touré (born July 30, 1980 in Vitry-sur-Seine, France) is a French basketball player who played 21 games for French Pro A league club Roanne during the 2004–05 season.
