= Ritchie Makuma Mpasa =

French footballer (born 1985)

Ritchie Makuma
Personal information
- Full name: Ritchie Makuma Mpasa
- Date of birth: 6 May 1985 (age 41)
- Place of birth: Vitry-sur-Seine, France
- Height: 1.85 m (6 ft 1 in)
- Position: Defender

Team information
- Current team: AC Amiens

Senior career*
Years	Team	Apps	(Gls)
2004–2006	Amiens	23	(0)
2006–2008	Angers	28	(2)
2008	Vannes	9	(0)
2009–2012	AS Beauvais	84	(3)
2013–	AC Amiens	43	(0)
- * Club domestic league appearances and goals as of 08:03, 21 November 2015 (UTC)

Ritchie Makuma Mpasa (born 6 May 1985) is a French footballer currently playing for AC Amiens as a defender. He previously played in Ligue 2 with Amiens SC.
