= Zinsou =

Zinsou is a surname. Notable people with the surname include:

- Émile Derlin Zinsou (1918–2016), Beninese political figure and physician
- Lionel Zinsou (born 1954), French economist and investment banker
- Marie-Cécile Zinsou (born 1982), French-Beninese art historian and entrepreneur
- Sénouvo Agbota Zinsou (born 1946), Togolese playwright and theater director
