= Mandu, Democratic Republic of the Congo =

Mandu
- Village
- Interactive map of Mandu
- Coordinates: 3.89695°N 22.42508°E
- Country: Democratic Republic of the Congo
- Province: Nord-Ubangi

Mandu is a small village in the Democratic Republic of Congo.
