= Guillermo Kuitca =

Argentine artist (born 1961)

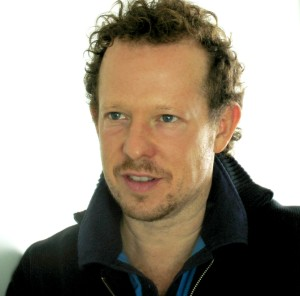
- Born: January 22, 1961 (age 64); Buenos Aires, Argentina
- Known for: Painting

Guillermo Kuitca (born 1961) is an Argentine artist, who continues to work and live in Buenos Aires. Kuitca's work has been shown extensively around the globe, and is included in many important public collections, including The Tate Gallery, England; The Metropolitan Museum of Art, New York, NY; Hirshhorn Museum and Sculpture Garden, Washington, DC; the North Carolina Museum of Art, Raleigh; Albright-Knox Art Gallery, Buffalo, NY and The Daros Collection, Zürich, Switzerland, and at the Walker Art Center in Minneapolis. Kuitca represented Argentina at the 2007 Venice Biennale. Recurrent themes of travel, maps, memory, and migration can be found in Kuitca’s work. He won the Konex Award from Argentina in 1992 and 2002.

== Early and mid-1980s ==
In the early and mid-1980s, Kuitca made works which incorporate theater imagery. Many paintings from this period feature figures on a stage-like platform, with titles often inspired by plays, literature and music.

== Late 1980s and early 1990s ==
In the late 1980s and early 1990s, Kuitca began to integrate the subjects of architecture and topography in his work, often exploring the confluence of communal and private spaces. The floor plans of public institutions, such as those found in the “Tablada Suite” series, geographical maps, and genealogical charts begin to serve as important references during this period". In 1992, Kuitca created his first works which incorporated the image of a painted bed, “often small and forlorn on the canvas.” Afterwards, the artist used the motif of an apartment floor plan, middle-class and compact, with only one bathroom. This floor plan would eventually lead to maps, theater plans and baggage carousels.

== 1990s and early 2000s ==
Kuitca continued to explore organizational systems, in his “Neufert Suite” (1998) and “Encyclopédie” (2002) series. In his “Global Order” (2002) works, Kuitca combines a world map with architectural plans for interior spaces, “identifying borders and notions of ‘place’ as the changing products of human invention.”

== Maps ==
Kuitca is well known “for his use of maps – particularly his transcriptions of topography onto mattresses”. Kuitca says he uses the image of a map “to get lost… not to get oriented.” Stemming from his experimentation with aerial views of floor plans, Kuitca moved to maps because “he liked the way they occupy a space somewhere between the abstract and the representational.”

== Exhibitions ==
- Projects 30: Guillermo Kuitca, The Museum of Modern Art, New York, 1991
