= Depara =

Angolan Congolese photographer (1928–1997)

- Born: Lemvo Jean Abou Bakar Depara; 1928; Kboklolo, Angola
- Died: 1997 (aged 68–69); Kinshasa, DR Congo
- Other names: Jean Depara
- Occupation: Photographer

Lemvo Jean Abou Bakar Depara, commonly known as Depara (1928–1997), was an Angolan-born photographer, who worked in the Democratic Republic of Congo.

== Career ==
Depara purchased his first video camera to record his wedding in 1950; four years later, he was made official photographer to the Zairian singer Franco. In 1975 he became official photographer to the National Assembly of Democratic Republic of Congo, and also took many photographs of the social scene of Kinshasa during the period.

At the time of his death in 1997, he left a large archive of untitled negatives; many of these have been reprinted and titled for sale since his death. Some of Depara's work is in the collection of Jean Pigozzi.
