= Fondation Cartier pour l'Art Contemporain =

Contemporary art museum in Paris, France

Coordinates: 48°51′47″N 2°20′13″E

Exterior view of Fondation Cartier pour l'Art Contemporain, February 2007

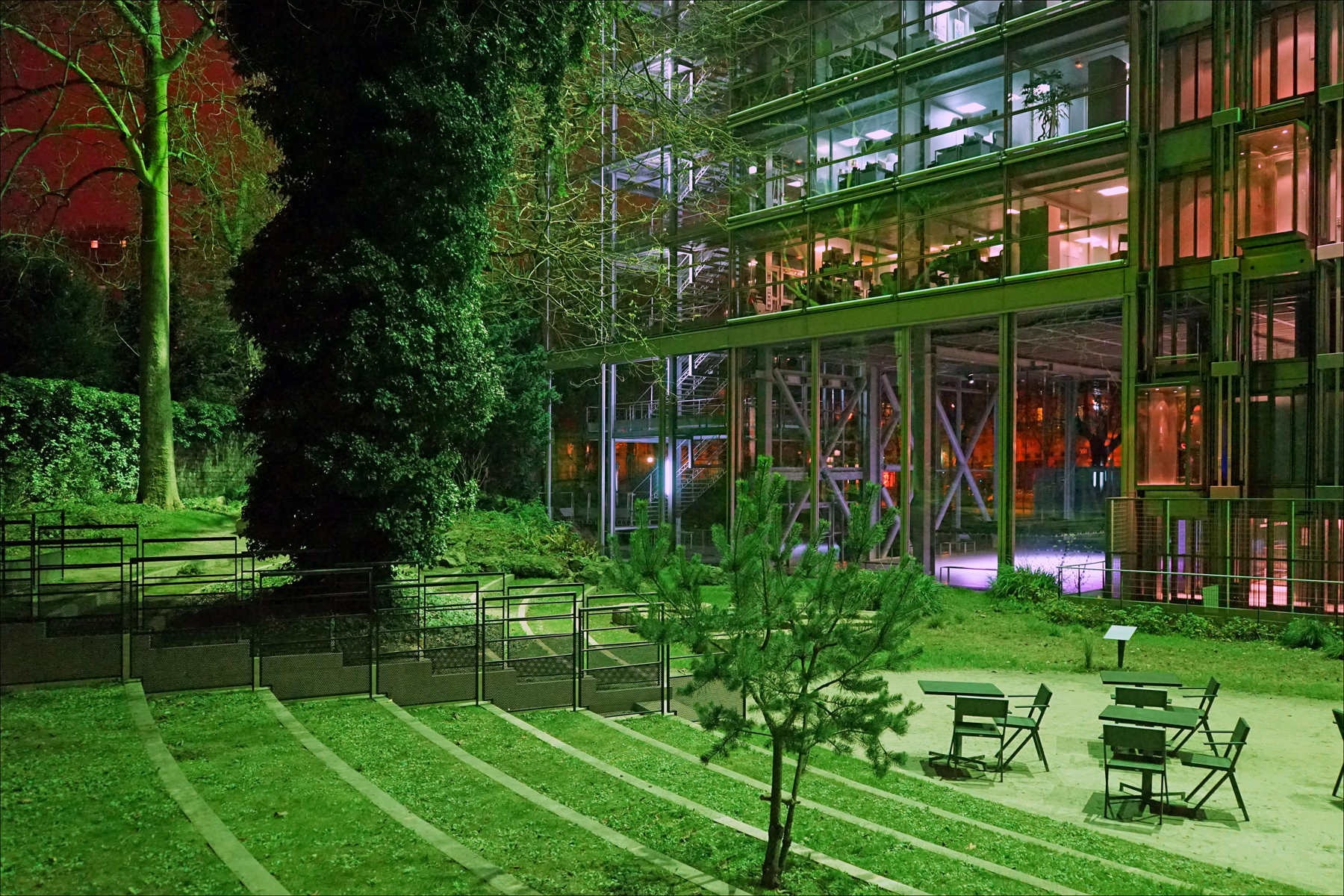
Fondation Cartier pour l'Art Contemporain, December 2014

The Fondation Cartier pour l'Art Contemporain (French: [fɔ̃dasjɔ̃ kaʁtje puʁ laʁ kɔ̃tɑ̃pɔʁɛ̃]), known simply as the Fondation Cartier, is a contemporary art museum at 2 place du Palais-Royal in the 1st arrondissement of Paris, France. It was located at 261 Boulevard Raspail in the 14th arrondissement of Paris until 2025, when it relocated to the Palais-Royal area, reopening to the public on 25 October 2025.

== History ==
The Fondation Cartier was created in 1984 by the Cartier SA firm as a center for contemporary art that presents exhibits by established artists, offers young artists a chance to debut, and incorporates works into its collection. The founding director was Marie-Claude Beaud.

In 1994, it moved to a glass building at 261 Boulevard Raspail designed by Pritzker Prize architect Jean Nouvel on the site of the former American Center for Students and Artists, surrounded by a modern woodland garden landscaped by Lothar Baumgarten. The ground floor of the building is eight meters (26 feet) high and glassed in on all sides.

In 2011, the president and founder of the Fondation Cartier, Alain Dominique Perrin, asked Nouvel to draw up preliminary plans for a new base on Île Seguin. By 2014, the foundation abandoned plans to relocate to the island and instead commissioned Nouvel to work on the expansion of the Boulevard Raspail premises. By 2024, Fondation Cartier presented Nouvel's designs for a new site opposite the Louvre, occupying more than 8,400 m^{2} (90,000 sq ft) on the ground floor and lower levels of a listed building.

== Collection ==
The museum displays exhibits of contemporary and international artists, and currently contains over 1500 works by more than 350 artists. Its collections include monumental works such as The Monument to Language by James Lee Byars, Caterpillar by Wim Delvoye, Backyard by Liza Lou, La Volière (The Aviary) by Jean-Pierre Raynaud, and Everything that Rises Must Converge by Sarah Sze; works by contemporary French artists including Vincent Beaurin, Gérard Garouste, Raymond Hains, Jean-Michel Othoniel, Alain Séchas, Pierrick Sorin, Jean Giraud; and works by foreign artists including James Coleman (Ireland), Thomas Demand (Germany), Alair Gomes (Brazil), William Kentridge (South Africa), Bodys Isek Kingelez (the Congo), Guillermo Kuitca (Argentina), Yukio Nakagawa (Japan), Huang Yong Ping (China), and Damian Pettigrew (Canada).

== Exhibitions ==
The museum opens daily except Monday, with an admission fee. Nearby Paris Métro stations include Palais Royal–Musée du Louvre and Pyramides on Line 1 and Line 7.

- 1986 : Les Années 1960, la décade triomphante
- 1987 : Hommage à Ferrari
- 1988 : MDF des créateurs pour un matériau
- 1988 : Vraiment faux
- 1991 : La Vitesse
- 1992 : À visage découvert – Machines d'architecture
- 1993 : Azur
- 1994 : Nobuyoshi Araki – Jean-Michel Alberola
- 1995 : Vija Celmins – Thierry Kuntzel – James Lee Byars – Bodys Isek Kingelez – Défilés et Vestiaires de Macha Makeieff et Jérôme Deschamps – Malick Sidibé –
- 1996 : Double vie, Double vue – Comme un oiseau – Tatsuo Miyajima – Marc Couturier – By Night
- 1997 : Amours – Coïncidences – Alain Séchas – Patrick Vilaire
- 1997 : Histoire de voir – la collection de la Fondation Cartier dans l'art contemporain dans les chateaux du Bordelais – Marina Faust – Seydou Keita – Gabriel Orozco – Jean-Michel Othoniel
- 1998 : Issey Miyake – Être nature – Francesca Woodman – Panamarenko – Gérard Deschamps
- 1999 : Sarah Sze – Herb Ritts – 1 monde réel – Radi Designers – Gottfried Honneger
- 2000 : Bernard Piffaretti – Thomas Demand – Le Désert – Okhai Ojeikere – Guillermo Kuitca – Cai Guo-Qiang
- 2001 : Gérard Garouste – William Eggleston – Un art populaire – Pierrick Sorin – Alair Gomes
- 2002 : Ce qui arrive – Takashi Murakami – Fragilisme
- 2003 : Daido Moriyama – Jean-Michel Othoniel – les Yanomami –
- 2004 : Hiroshi Sugimoto – Raymond Depardon – Pain couture par Jean-Paul Gaultier – Chéri Samba – Marc Newson
- 2005 : Juergen Teller – Ron Mueck – John Maeda – J'en rêve – Adriana Varejão – Rinko Kawauchi
- 2006 : Tabaimo – Gary Hill – Agnès Varda – Tadanori Yokoo
- 2007 : Lee Bul – Robert Adams – Rock'n'roll 39–59 – David Lynch
- 2008 : Patti Smith – Andrea Branzi – César – Terre Natale, Ailleurs commence ici (Raymond Depardon / Paul Virilio)
- 2009 : Beatriz Milhazes – William Eggleston – Né dans la rue
- 2010 : Jean Giraud – Moebius-Transe-Forme – Metamoebius by Damian Pettigrew
- 2011 : Les Trésors du Vaudou – Mathématiques, un dépaysement soudain
- 2012 : Histoires de voir, Show and Tell – Yue Minjun : L'Ombre du sourire
- 2013 : Ron Mueck – America Latina 1960
- 2014 : Mémoires Vives, Vivid Memories – Diller & Scofidio + Renfro Musings on a Glass Box – Guillermo Kuitca Les Habitants
- 2015 : Bruce Nauman – Beauté Congo 1926–2015 Congo Kitoko
- 2021–2022: Damien Hirst – Cherry Blossoms

== See also ==
- List of museums in Paris
- World Architecture Survey

== Sources ==
- Fondation Cartier pour l'Art Contemporain
- Paris.fr entry
- Paris, Petit Futé, 2007, page 129. ISBN 2-7469-1701-7.
