= Chéri Samba =

Congolese painter (born 1956)

- Born: David Samba; 30 December 1956 (age 69); Kinto M’Vuila, Madimba, Bas-Congo District, Belgian Congo
- Known for: Painting

Chéri Samba or Samba wa Mbimba N’zingo Nuni Masi Ndo Mbasi (born 30 December 1956) is a Congolese painter from the Democratic Republic of Congo. He is one of the best known contemporary African artists, with his works being included in the collections of the Centre Georges Pompidou in Paris and the Museum of Modern Art in New York. A large number of his paintings are also found in The Contemporary African Art Collection (CAAC) of Jean Pigozzi. He has been invited to participate in the 2007 Venice Biennale. His paintings almost always include text in French and Lingala, commenting on life in Africa and the modern world. Samba lives in Kinshasa and Paris.

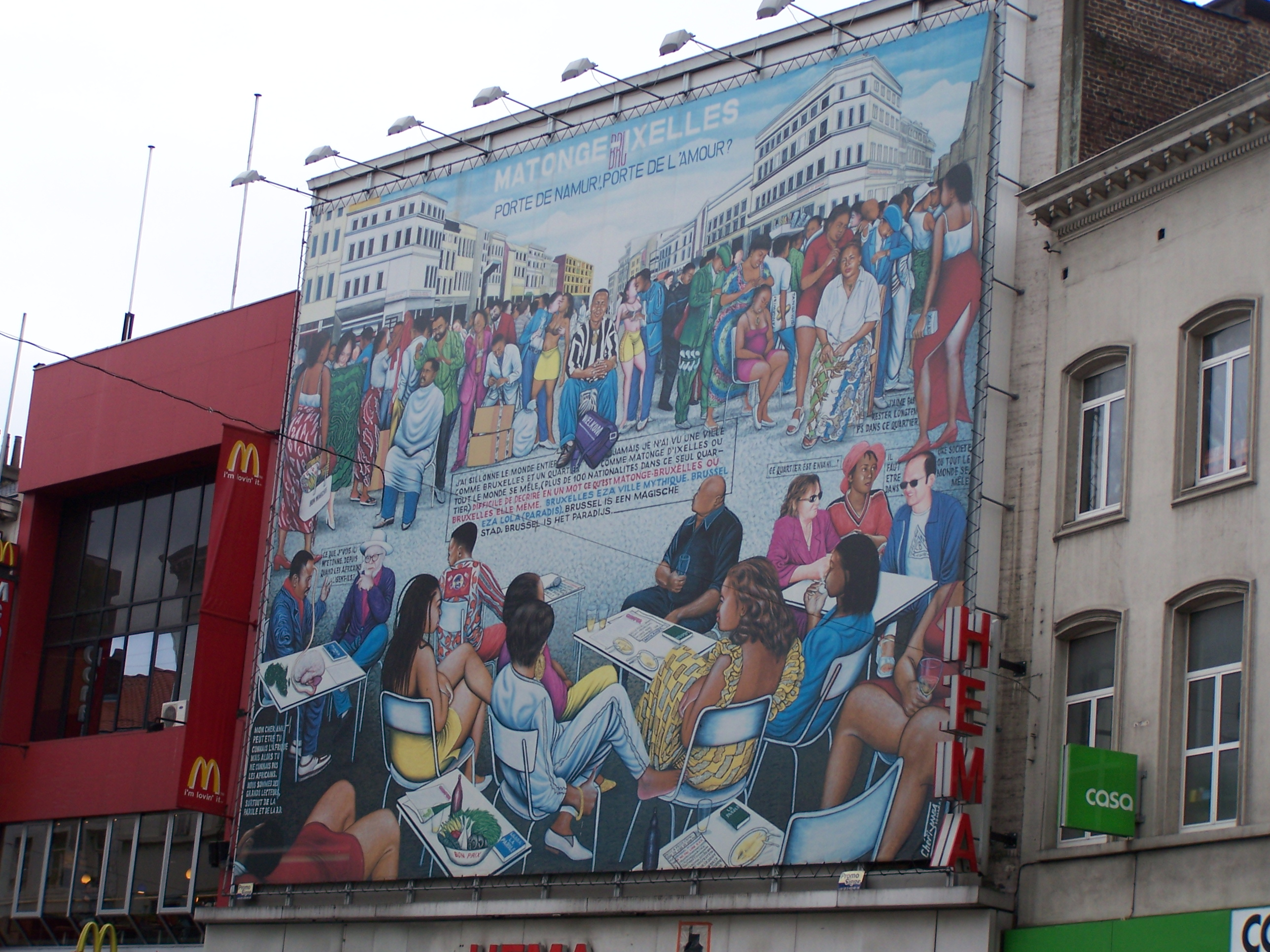
Painting representing the African community near the Naamse Poort - Chéri Samba Porte de Namur, porte de l'amour

== Early life ==
Originally, Samba's name was David Samba, but in his country there was a ban on keeping/giving people a Christian first name, so he decided to change it to Samba wa Mbimba N’zingo Nuni Masi Ndo Mbasi. Later on, Samba adopted the name Chéri Samba, which he originally wanted to change to Dessinateur Samba, but didn't because of his relationship with the public. His last name, Samba, has two meanings in the Kikongo language, referring to the act of prayer or the act of being judged.

Samba's parents were associated with the Kongo culture, but Samba chooses to identify himself with the Kinshasa culture, which is the capital of his country. Samba claims that he was turned into a Catholic, while he attended school. He doesn't reject or deny Christianity, which is the religion he grew up on, but he says he tries to resist any attempt to affix a confession label to his religion. After graduating from primary Catholic school, Samba went to high school. Samba maintained second in class, except for one year where he was first. In his third year, Samba quit. While in school, Samba was always drawing and remembered that his father did not like seeing him draw. Cherí Samba's religion is Catholic with a Zairian twist, which influenced many of his paintings like Cherí Samba Beseeches the Cosmos.

== Biography ==
Chéri Samba was born in Kinto M’Vuila, Democratic Republic of Congo,as the elder son of a family of 10 children. His father was a blacksmith and his mother a farmer. In 1972, at the age of 16 Samba left the village to find work as a sign painter in the capital of Kinshasa, where he encountered such artists as Moké and Bodo. This group of artists, including Samba's younger brother Cheik Ledy, came to constitute one of the country's most vibrant schools of popular painting.

In 1975, Samba opened his own studio. At the same time he also became an illustrator for the entertainment magazine Bilenge Info. Working both as a billboard painter and a comic-strip artist, he used the styles of both genres when he began making his paintings on sacking cloth. He borrowed the use of "word bubbles" from comic-strip art, which allowed him to add not only narrative but also commentary to his compositions, thus giving him his signature style of combining painting with text. His work earned him some local fame. In 1979 Samba participated in the exhibition Moderne Kunst aus Afrika, organized in West Berlin. The exhibition was part of the program of the first festival Horizonte - Festival der Weltkulturen.

He is the central figure in the 1982 documentary film Kin Kiesse, offering his thoughts on life in Kinshasa. According to the film's director, Mwezé Ngangura, Samba was instrumental in the making of the film, convincing the French Ministry of Co-operation, France 2 and Congolese television that Ngangura could make a film on Kinshasa.

Samba's breakthrough was the exhibition Les Magiciens de la Terre at the Centre Georges Pompidou in Paris in 1989, which made him known internationally. He then benefited from an artist residency at Cité internationale des arts in Paris, in 1990, which helped grounding him in Paris.

In 2007, curator Robert Storr invited Samba to participate in the 52nd International Art Exhibition at the Venice Biennale, entitled "Think with the Senses—Feel with the Mind. Art in the Present Tense", and described by The Huffington Post as "certainly 'the exhibition' of this new Century".

== Philosophy ==
Samba's pieces aims to emphasize poverty, stupidity about his culture, corruption, and chaos in his work. Samba says, “I appeal to people’s consciences…I paint reality even if it’s shocking, I put humor and color into it to attract people. In his piece, J'aime la couleur piece goes into race and self identity". It explains how Samba believes that experience and process of sustaining and recreating a common identity across the African diaspora will show how to strengthen a community. He usually paints himself at the center of his visual social commentaries.

== Similar artists ==
- Hieronymus Bosch
- William Kentridge
- Camille-Pierre Pambu Bodo, Bodo
- Moké
- Abdoulaye Konaté
