= Moké =

Congolese painter (1950–2001)

Moké (1950 – 2001; or Moke, né Monsengwo Kejwamfi), was a Congolese painter.

He was born in Ibe, Bandundu Province, Democratic Republic of the Congo in 1950. He died on September 26, 2001, in Kinshasa, a city from which he drew inspiration. Together with Chéri Samba, Chéri Chérin and other painters of the Kinshasa school like Cheik Ledy, Tshibumba Kanda-Matulu and Sim Simaro, Moké was one of the foremost depicters of Congolese popular life. He is considered a naivist, while he described himself as a "painter-journalist".

== Exhibitions ==
- 2018 - E-mois, Museum of Contemporary Art Al Maaden, Marrakech, Morocco
- 2016 - " Songeries et réjouissances ", Collection Philippe Pellering & Boris Vanhoutte, Musée Africain de Namur, Musée du Masque de Binche, Belgium
- 2014 - Moké, une collection particulière 1991-1992, galerie Espace Lorraine, Bruxelles, Belgium
- 2011 - Japancongo, Le Magasin, Grenoble, France.
- 2010 - African Stories, Marrakech Art Fair, Marrakech, Morocco.
- 2008 - Popular Painting from Kinshasa, Tate Modern, Londres, GB.
- 2006 - 100% Africa, Guggenheim Museum (Bilbao), Spain.
- 2005 - Arts of Africa, Grimaldi Forum, Monaco, France.
- 2005 - African Art Now : Masterpieces from the Jean Pigozzi Collection, Museum of Fine Arts Houston, Houston, United States.
- 2004 - Peinture populaire congolaise, ADEIAO, Centre d’Études Africaines, Maison des sciences de l’homme, Paris, France.
- 2003 - Kin Moto na Bruxelles, Hôtel de ville de Bruxelles, Belgium.
- 2003 - Regards Croisés, La Galerie d’Art de Creteil, Créteil, France.
- 2003 - Der Rest der Welt, Neuffer am Park, Pirmasens, Germany.
- 2002 - Monsenguro Kejwamfi dit Peintre Moke « Grand maître de la peinture zaïroise », Musée d'Art moderne et contemporain (Genève), Switzerland, (solo).
- 2002 - Kinshasa, Congo, Moke, Cheri Samba, Rigobert; Espace Croisé, Centre d'art contemporain de Roubaix, France.
- 2002 - Afrique dans les murs, Les Naufragés du Temps, Saint-Malo, France (solo).
- 2001 - Un Art Populaire, Fondation Cartier pour l'art contemporain, Paris, France.
- 1997 - "Ecole de Kinshasa", Galerie Peter Herrmann, Stuttgart, Germany
- 1996 - Bomoi Mobimba Toute la vie, 7 artistes zaïrois, Collection Lucien Bilinelli, Centre d'art contemporain, Palais des Beaux-Arts de Charleroi, Belgium.
- 1995-1996 - An Inside Story : African Art of our Time Beyong Art, Setagaya Art Museum, Tokyo; The Tokushima Modern Art Museum; Himeji City Museum of Art; Koriyama City Museum of Art; Marugame Inokuma-Genichiro Museum of Contemporary Art; The Museum of Fine Art, Gifu, Japan.
- 1993-1994 - Skizzen eines Projektes, Afrika Im Ludwig Forum für Internationale Kunst, Ludwig, Germany.
- 1992 - Out of Africa, Galerie Saatchi, London, G.B.
- 1991-1992 - Africa Hoy/Africa Now, Centro Atlantico de Arte Moderno, Las Palmas de Gran Canaria; Cultural Center and Contemporary Art, Mexico City; Groningen Museum, Groningen, the Netherlands.
- 1991 - Ny Afrikansk Billedkunst Rundetarn, Copenhagen, Denmark.
- 1985 - Peintre Populaires du Zaire; L'art vivant d'Afrique Centrale, Université de Montréal, Marius-Barbeau Museum, Gallery Trompe-l'œil, Media Center, Québec.
- 1983 - Goethe-Institut, Kinshasa, DRC.
- 1979 - Centre culturel français, Kinshasa, DRC, (solo),
- 1979 - Moderne Kunst aus Afrika, Festival de Berlin Horizante'79, Stautliche Kunsthalle Berlin, Germany.
- 1978 - Art Partout, Académie des beaux-arts, CIAF, Kinshasa, DRC.
- 1969 - Première Foire internationale de Kinshasa, DRC.
- 1968 - Exposition artistique et artisanale de Kinshasa, Ministère de la Culture et du Tourisme, Parc de la Révolution, Kinshasa, DRC.
