= Jean Pigozzi =

Italian businessman (born 1952)

Jean Christophe "Johnny" Pigozzi (born 1952), is a French-born socialite, venture capitalist, and art collector with the world's largest private African art collection, The Contemporary African Art Collection. Pigozzi is known as a photographer for his large collection of selfies taken with celebrities since the mid 1970s. He is the son and heir of Henri Pigozzi, founder of the Simca automotive company.

== Early life and education ==
In 1952, Pigozzi was born in Paris into a wealthy family from Turin, Italy. He is the son of Henri Pigozzi, who founded and led the Simca automobile company, and grew up between the family's estates in Paris and Antibes, France. At age 11, Pigozzi learned that he had been born to one of his father's mistresses, not the woman he had believed to be mother. He was soon sent to a Jesuit boarding school. When he returned home at age 12, he learned his father had died of a sudden heart attack that day.

Pigozzi later said he was relieved by his death and had been "terrified" of his father: "He was really tough on me, and what drove him crazy is that I was a bad student because I was dyslexic." Pigozzi stated in 2025, at age 73, "My childhood was not good. And so I am reliving it now".

Pigozzi studied at Harvard College from 1970 to 1974, where he developed his interest in contemporary art. He was influenced by his professor Douglas Huebler, who introduced him to the photo book The Americans by Robert Frank, which captured ordinary subjects.

== Career ==
After graduating in 1974, Pigozzi moved back to Paris to work as a salesman for Technifil, a shopping cart manufacturing company owned by his uncle. A Harvard friend later introduced him to the president of the French film studio Gaumont, which sent Pigozzi to Los Angeles for about six months to explore a potential merger with 20th Century Fox. Pigozzi said, "They sent me for two reasons: One, I could speak English. Nobody at Gaumont really spoke English. And number two, they didn't really pay me, so it was not expensive for them."

Pigozzi returned to Paris, and began to spend three to four months of the year in New York City, where he stayed either at the Carlyle Hotel or with Jann Wenner of Rolling Stone (whom he met through Max Palevsky) and amassed a large social circle of rich and famous figures.

=== Photography ===
Pigozzi is known for taking selfies with celebrities since the 1970s, before selfie was a word. His first was with Faye Dunaway when she visited Harvard to accept the Hasty Pudding Club's "Woman of the Year" award in February 1974. He continued to photograph himself with famous figures on weekend trips to New York City, including Hunter S. Thompson and Andy Warhol, typically on a Leica camera with flash. Over the decades, he has captured himself with figures like Dolly Parton, Pelé, Sarah Jessica Parker, and David Hockney.

In a 1983 he made a shot of Steve Jobs giving the finger to an IBM office.

=== Investments ===
Pigozzi began investing after he received his inheritance at age 21. Pigozzi has been an early investor in many technology companies, including Facebook and OpenAI. In 2025, his net worth was estimated at $350 million. In 1991, Spy magazine sold a majority interest to several European investors including Pigozzi and Charles Saatchi, amounting to $4 million in total investment.

=== Other ===
In 2007, Pigozzi founded LimoLand, a clothing and accessories line featuring bright colors and prints intended for those who "live to create". As creative director of the brand, Pigozzi draws sketches of his line, and outsources the technical aspects of design and production. In 2010, LimoLine had a storefront in New York City and appeared in upscale department stores such as Bloomingdale's, Bergdorf Goodman, and Nordstrom.

His interview program "My Friends call Me Johnny" debuted September 3, 2014 on Esquire Network.

== Lifestyle ==
Pigozzi has been described as a "consummate playboy" in The New York Times. His lifestyle involves extensive luxury and travel; he attends what he refers to as "a circuit" of prestigious events, including the Wimbledon Championships, Art Basel, the TED conference (where he attended a "billionaires' dinner), and exclusive gatherings of superyachts in the Mediterranean. He owns a villa in Antibes, France.

Pigozzi is known for his famous friends, including Bono, Mick Jagger, and Jack Dorsey. For many years he hosted an annual pool party at Cannes Film Festival with high-profile guests including Woody Allen, Uma Thurman, and Paul Allen. In 2010, Vanity Fair published a feature on Pigozzi that included a map of his connections to powerful figures and a quote from Elton John calling Pigozzi "one of the world's greatest characters. I don't really know what he does, though, apart from always taking those pictures."

He owns a villa in Cap d’Antibes in the South of France as well an acropolis in Panama and apartments in New York, Paris, London, and Geneva. Pigozzi has never married ("because I'm a bad negotiator", he stated) and has no children. He has dated extensively throughout his life, and six former girlfriends attended his 60th birthday party. Pigozzi describes himself as dyslexic. He says that he does not drink, smoke, or use drugs. Twice a day, he practices transcendental meditation.

== Collection of African art ==
Pigozzi started collecting contemporary African art in 1989 after visiting the show "Magiciens de la Terre" at the Centre Pompidou and Grande Halle de la Villette in Paris. He has assembled the world's largest private collection of contemporary African art, which now comprises The Contemporary African Art Collection in Geneva. It includes about 10,000 items that he selected along with the French curator André Magnin.

Though the collection is not on permanent display to the public, it has been exhibited at more than 60 museums and events around the world, including the National Museum of African Art, Guggenheim Museum Bilbao, Tate Modern, Grand Palais, Venice Biennale, and others. In July 2019, Pigozzi donated 45 works of contemporary African art to the Museum of Modern Art, including pieces by Frédéric Bruly Bouabré, Jean Depara, Romuald Hazoumè, Seydou Keïta, Bodys Isek Kingelez, Abu Bakarr Mansaray, Moké, Ambroise Ngaimoko, and Chéri Samba.

In 2006, Pigozzi also started the JaPigozzi Collection of Contemporary Japanese Art (japigozzi.com) by young Japanese artists.

=== Collecting philosophy ===
Pigozzi seeks out highly original works by self-taught artists. He wrote in 2005, "I have never been interested in the politics that surround art. That just seems pointless to me – I hate it. I am interested in good, new, strong, innovative art; not talking about it for hours and hours." Referring to his interest in collecting art, he compared himself to "a sick addict, wanting more and more of what I love."

== Bibliography ==
=== Books by Pigozzi ===
- A Short Visit to Planet Earth: Photographs. New York: Aperture, 1991. ISBN 0-89381-479-2.
- Pigozzi's Journal of the Seventies. Doubleday, 1979. With an introduction by Jann Wenner. ISBN 978-0-385-15104-7.
- Catalogue Deraisonne. Steidldangin, 2010. ISBN 978-3-86930-034-4.
- Pool Party. Rizzoli, 2016. ISBN 978-0847849161.
- Me+Co, 2017, Damiani, ISBN 9788862085502
- Charles and Saatchi: The Dogs, 2018, Damiani, ISBN 9788862085922
- The 223 Most Important Men in My Life, 2019, Damiani, ISBN 9788862086714

=== Books about Pigozzi by others ===
- Arts of Africa: The Contemporary Collection of Jean Pigozzi. 2005. André Magnin. ISBN 88-7624-296-1.
- African Art Now: Masterpieces from the Jean Pigozzi Collection. 2005. André Magnin; Alison De Lima Greene; Alvia Wardlaw; Thomas McEvilley. ISBN 1-85894-289-6.
- Jean Pigozzi, dans la peau d'un collectionneur, Catherine Grenier, 2017, Flammarion, ISBN 2081413191
- Les Initiés, Un choix d'oeuvres dans la collection d'art contemporain africain de Jean Pigozzi, 2017, Dilecta, Fondation Louis Vuitton, ISBN 2373720353

== Photography exhibitions ==
=== Exhibitions ===
- 1974: Musée d’Art Moderne, Paris
- 1980: Light Gallery, New York
- 1991: A Short Visit to Planet Earth, Gagosian Gallery, New York
- 2008: Pigozzi and the Paparazzi, Helmut Newton Foundation, Berlin
- 2010: Rencontres d'Arles festival, France
- 2010: Johnny Stop!, Gagosian Gallery, New York, 2010; Colette, Paris, 2010; SEM-ART Gallery, Monaco, 2012.
- 2010: Clic Gallery, St. Barths
- 2011: Pigozzi, STOP! You're too close, Multimedia Art Museum, Moscow
- 2012: Unseen International Art Fair, Galerie Alex Daniels-REFLEX, Amsterdam
- 2013: Johnny's Diary - Photographies de Jean Pigozzi, Galerie du Jour, Agnesb, Paris
- 2013: Photographs featured in a film short directed by Brett Ratner for Vanity Fair's 100th Anniversary.
- 2014: My World, Jean Pigozzi, Ullens Center for Contemporary Art, Beijing
- 2016: Johnny's Pool, Jean Pigozzi, Gagosian Gallery, New York City, 2016; The Baker Museum, Naples, Florida, 2016: Galerie Gmurzynska, St. Moritz, Switzerland, 2017; Helmut Newton Foundation, Berlin, Germany,
- 2017: Galerie Gmurzynska, St. Moritz (2017), and the Helmut Newton Foundation in Berlin.
- 2018: Scai The Bathhouse, Tokyo (2018), Immagis Fine Art Photography, Munich, and Pilevneli Gallery, Istanbul
