= 2006 FIFA World Cup qualification – CAF second round =

Football tournament

The CAF second round of 2006 FIFA World Cup qualification began on 5 June 2004 and finished on 8 October 2005.

The highest-ranked country in each group at the end of the stage qualified for the 2006 FIFA World Cup. This round also doubled as qualification for the 2006 African Cup of Nations, for which the top three teams from each group qualified.

== Format ==
The 30 teams (9 teams given a bye directly to the second round and 21 winners from the first round) were split into five groups of six teams each – with all teams playing home and away against each of the other five teams in the group.

The highest-ranked team in each group qualified for the 2006 FIFA World Cup, while the top three teams qualified for the 2006 Africa Cup of Nations (except in Egypt's case; since Egypt qualified for the tournament directly as hosts, fourth-placed Libya qualified in its place.)

== Seeding ==
The draw was held on 5 December 2003 in Frankfurt, Germany. The thirty eligible teams were divided into six groups of five teams. Pot A contained the five teams that had participated in the 2002 FIFA World Cup, while the teams in pots B–F were ranked based on the most recent FIFA world ranking.

Pot A	Pot B	Pot C	Pot D	Pot E	Pot F
Senegal; South Africa; Cameroon; Nigeria; Tunisia	Egypt; Morocco; Zimbabwe; DR Congo; Mali	Algeria; Ivory Coast; Zambia; Kenya; Burkina Faso	Ghana; Angola; Libya; Togo; Guinea	Malawi; Uganda; Gabon; Sudan; Liberia	Rwanda; Congo; Botswana; Benin; Cape Verde

== Group 1 ==
Pos	Team	Pld	W	D	L	GF	GA	GD	Pts	Qualification	(Togo)	(Senegal)	(Zambia)	(Republic of the Congo)	(Mali)	(Liberia)
1	Togo	10	7	2	1	20	8	+12	23	2006 FIFA World Cup and 2006 Africa Cup of Nations	—	3–1	4–1	2–0	1–0	3–0
2	Senegal	10	6	3	1	21	8	+13	21	2006 Africa Cup of Nations	2–2	—	1–0	2–0	3–0	6–1
3	Zambia	10	6	1	3	16	10	+6	19	2006 Africa Cup of Nations	1–0	0–1	—	2–0	2–1	1–0
4	Congo	10	3	1	6	10	14	−4	10		2–3	0–0	2–3	—	1–0	3–0
5	Mali	10	2	2	6	11	14	−3	8		1–2	2–2	1–1	2–0	—	4–1
6	Liberia	10	1	1	8	3	27	−24	4		0–0	0–3	0–5	0–2	1–0	—

Rules for classification: Tiebreakers
5 June 2004
15:00

Zambia	1–0	Togo
Mulenga 11'	Report

Independence Stadium, Lusaka
Attendance: 40,000
Referee: Jerome Damon (South Africa)
5 June 2004
16:30

Senegal	2–0	Congo
Diatta 59'; M. N'Diaye 77'	Report

Stade Leopold Senghor, Dakar
Attendance: 18,000
Referee: Mohamed Benouza (Algeria)
6 June 2004
16:00

Liberia	1–0	Mali
Kieh 85'	Report

National Complex, Paynesville
Attendance: 30,000
Referee: Coffi Codjia (Benin)

19 June 2004
19:00

Mali	1–1	Zambia
Kanouté 80'	Report	Milanzi 25'

Stade 26 mars, Bamako
Attendance: 19,000
Referee: Modou Sowe (Gambia)
20 June 2004
15:30

Congo	3–0	Liberia
Bouanga 52'; Disney 55'; Batota 66'	Report

Stade Alphonse Massemba-Débat, Brazzaville
Attendance: 25,000
Referee: Mohamed Ould Lemghambodj (Mauritania)
20 June 2004
16:00

Togo	3–1	Senegal
Adebayor 30'; Sènaya 76' 85'	Report	P.B. Diop 81'

Stade de Kégué, Lomé
Attendance: 25,000
Referee: Abderrahim El Arjoun (Morocco)

3 July 2004
16:30

Senegal	1–0	Zambia
Gueye 21'	Report

Stade Leopold Senghor, Dakar
Attendance: 50,000
Referee: Manuel Monteiro Duarte (Cape Verde)
4 July 2004
15:30

Congo	1–0	Mali
Disney 30'	Report

Stade Alphonse Massemba-Débat, Brazzaville
Attendance: 20,000
Referee: Divine Evehe (Cameroon)
4 July 2004
16:00

Liberia	0–0	Togo
	Report

National Complex, Paynesville
Attendance: 30,000
Referee: Mohamed Soumah (Guinea)

4 September 2004
15:00

Zambia	1–0	Liberia
Bwalya 90+1'	Report

Independence Stadium, Lusaka
Attendance: 30,000
Referee: Kuedza Nchengwa (Botswana)
5 September 2004
16:00

Togo	2–0	Congo
Adebayor 37' 80'	Report

Stade de Kégué, Lomé
Attendance: 20,000
Referee: Jean-Olivier Mbera (Gabon)
5 September 2004
17:00

Mali	2–2	Senegal
Diallo 4'; Kanouté 54'	Report	H. Camara 45'; Dia 84'

Stade 26 mars, Bamako
Attendance: 45,000
Referee: Mohamed Guezzaz (Morocco)

10 October 2004
15:30

Congo	2–3	Zambia
Bouanga 75'; Disney 81'	Report	Mbesuma 2' 37' 65'

Stade Alphonse Massemba-Débat, Brazzaville
Attendance: 20,000
Referee: Atef Yacoubi (Tunisia)
10 October 2004
16:00

Togo	1–0	Mali
Adebayor 23'	Report

Stade de Kégué, Lomé
Attendance: 45,000
Referee: Gilbert Njike (Cameroon)
10 October 2004
16:00

Liberia	0–3	Senegal
	Report	P.B. Diop 41'; H. Camara 50' 73'

National Complex, Paynesville
Attendance: 26,000
Referee: Sharaf Aboubacar (Ivory Coast)

26 March 2005
15:00

Zambia	2–0	Congo
Tana 1'; Mbesuma 44'	Report

Konkola Stadium, Chililabombwe
Attendance: 20,000
Referee: Eddy Maillet (Seychelles)
26 March 2005
16:30

Senegal	6–1	Liberia
Fadiga 19'; E.H. Diouf 45' (pen.) 84'; A. Faye 56'; H. Camara 72'; M. N'Diaye 75'	Report	Tondo 86'

Stade Leopold Senghor, Dakar
Attendance: 50,000
Referee: Abdullhakim Shelmani (Libya)
27 March 2005
18:00

Mali	1–2	Togo
S. Coulibaly 12'	Report	Salifou 78'; Chérif Touré 90+1'

Stade 26 mars, Bamako
Attendance: 45,000
Referee: Justus Agbenyega (Ghana)

5 June 2005
15:30

Togo	4–1	Zambia
Adebayor 14' 94'; Chérif Touré 45+2'; Kader 61'	Report	Kampamba 15'

Stade de Kégué, Lomé
Attendance: 15,000
Referee: Mohamed Guezzaz (Morocco)
5 June 2005
15:30

Congo	0–0	Senegal
	Report

Stade Alphonse Massemba-Débat, Brazzaville
Attendance: 40,000
Referee: Jerome Damon (South Africa)
5 June 2005
17:00

Mali	4–1	Liberia
D. Coulibaly 7' (pen.) 34'; Diamoutene 48' (pen.); Diarra 75'	Report	Toe 54'

Stade Amari Daou, Ségou
Attendance: 11,000
Referee: Lassina Paré (Burkina Faso)

18 June 2005
15:00

Zambia	2–1	Mali
Chalwe 26'; Mbesuma 85'	Report	S. Coulibaly 73'

Konkola Stadium, Chililabombwe
Attendance: 29,000
Referee: Eugenio Colembi (Angola)
18 June 2005
17:00

Senegal	2–2	Togo
Niang 15'; H. Camara 30'	Report	Olufadé 11'; Adebayor 71'

Stade Leopold Senghor, Dakar
Attendance: 50,000
Referee: Hichem Guirat (Tunisia)
19 June 2005
16:00

Liberia	0–2	Congo
	Report	Bhebey 3' 73'

National Complex, Paynesville
Attendance: 5,000
Referee: Malick Sillah (Gambia)

3 September 2005
15:00

Zambia	0–1	Senegal
	Report	E.H. Diouf 57'

Konkola Stadium, Chililabombwe
Attendance: 20,000
Referee: Essam Abd El Fatah (Egypt)
3 September 2005
18:00

Mali	2–0	Congo
Demba 48'; Sissoko 51'	Report

Stade 26 mars, Bamako
Attendance: 10,000
Referee: Jean-Olivier Mbera (Gabon)
4 September 2005
15:30

Togo	3–0	Liberia
Adebayor 52', 90+3'; Chérif Touré 69'	Report

Stade de Kégué, Lomé
Attendance: 28,000
Referee: Khalid Abdel Rahman (Sudan)

1 October 2005
16:00

Liberia	0–5	Zambia
	Report	Lwipa 50' 82'; Mweetwa 51' 63'; Numba 61'

Antoinette Tubman Stadium, Monrovia
Attendance: 0 (Note: Due to security concerns related to elections, the match was played behind closed doors.)
Referee: Divine Evehe (Cameroon)
8 October 2005
15:00

Senegal	3–0	Mali
H. Camara 18' 65'; E.H. Diouf 23'	Report

Stade Leopold Senghor, Dakar
Attendance: 30,000
Referee: Eddy Maillet (Seychelles)
8 October 2005
16:00

Congo	2–3	Togo
Bouity 26'; Disney 56'	Report	Adebayor 40'; Kader 60', 70'

Stade Alphonse Massemba-Débat, Brazzaville
Attendance: 20,000
Referee: Abdullhakim Shelmani (Libya)

== Group 2 ==
Pos	Team	Pld	W	D	L	GF	GA	GD	Pts	Qualification	(Ghana)	(Democratic Republic of the Congo)	(South Africa)	(Burkina Faso)	(Cape Verde)	(Uganda)
1	Ghana	10	6	3	1	17	4	+13	21	2006 FIFA World Cup and 2006 Africa Cup of Nations	—	0–0	3–0	2–1	2–0	2–0
2	DR Congo	10	4	4	2	14	10	+4	16 (Note: Head-to-head points: Congo DR 4, South Africa 1.)	2006 Africa Cup of Nations	1–1	—	1–0	3–2	2–1	4–0
3	South Africa	10	5	1	4	12	14	−2	16	2006 Africa Cup of Nations	0–2	2–2	—	2–0	2–1	2–1
4	Burkina Faso	10	4	1	5	14	13	+1	13		1–0	2–0	3–1	—	1–2	2–0
5	Cape Verde	10	3	1	6	8	15	−7	10		0–4	1–1	1–2	1–0	—	1–0
6	Uganda	10	2	2	6	6	15	−9	8		1–1	1–0	0–1	2–2	1–0	—

Rules for classification: Tiebreakers
Notes:
5 June 2004
15:00 UTC+2

South Africa	2–1	Cape Verde
Mabizela 40', 68'	Report	Janício 73'

Free State Stadium, Bloemfontein
Attendance: 30,000
Referee: Hailemelak Tessema (Ethiopia)
5 June 2004
18:00 UTC+0

Burkina Faso	1–0	Ghana
Zongo 79'	Report

Stade du 4 Août, Ouagadougou
Attendance: 25,000
Referee: Chukwudi Chukwujekwu (Nigeria)
6 June 2004
16:00 UTC+3

Uganda	1–0	DR Congo
Sekagya 75'	Report

National Stadium, Kampala
Attendance: 45,000
Referee: Eddy Maillet (Seychelles)

19 June 2004
16:00 UTC−1

Cape Verde	1–0	Uganda
Cafú 42'	Report

Estádio da Várzea, Praia
Attendance: 5,000
Referee: Koman Coulibaly (Mali)
20 June 2004
15:00 UTC+0

Ghana	3–0	South Africa
Muntari 13'; Appiah 55', 78'	Report

Baba Yara Stadium, Kumasi
Attendance: 32,000
Referee: Badara Diatta (Senegal)
20 June 2004
15:30 UTC+1

DR Congo	3–2	Burkina Faso
Mbayo 12'; Biscotte 75'; Bageta 88' (pen.)	Report	Touré 26'; Dagano 85'

Stade des Martyrs, Kinshasa
Attendance: 75,000
Referee: Kokou Djaoupe (Togo)

3 July 2004
15:00 UTC+2

South Africa	2–0	Burkina Faso
Pienaar 14'; Bartlett 42'	Report

FNB Stadium, Johannesburg
Attendance: 25,000
Referee: Lanto Ramanampamonjy (Madagascar)
3 July 2004
16:00 UTC−1

Cape Verde	1–1	DR Congo
Modeste 26'	Report	Kaluyituka 1'

Estádio da Várzea, Praia
Attendance: 3,800
Referee: Monetchet Nahi (Ivory Coast)
3 July 2004
16:30 UTC+3

Uganda	1–1	Ghana
Obua 45+1'	Report	Gyan 88'

National Stadium, Kampala
Attendance: 20,000
Referee: Reda El-Beltagy (Egypt)

4 September 2004
18:00 UTC+0

Burkina Faso	2–0	Uganda
Dagano 34'; Nikiema 79'	Report

Stade du 4 Août, Ouagadougou
Attendance: 30,000
Referee: Mohamed Ould Lemghambodj (Mauritania)
5 September 2004
15:00 UTC+0

Ghana	2–0	Cape Verde
Essien 24' (pen.); Veiga 62' (o.g.)	Report

Baba Yara Stadium, Kumasi
Attendance: 35,000
Referee: Wahid Tamuni (Libya)
5 September 2004
15:30 UTC+1

DR Congo	1–0	South Africa
Musasa 86'	Report

Stade des Martyrs, Kinshasa
Attendance: 85,000
Referee: Jean-Marie Hicuburundi (Burundi)

9 October 2004
16:00 UTC−1

Cape Verde	1–0	Burkina Faso
Cafú 2'	Report

Estádio da Várzea, Praia
Attendance: 6,000
Referee: Kudzo Aziaka (Togo)
10 October 2004
15:00 UTC+0

Ghana	0–0	DR Congo
	Report

Baba Yara Stadium, Kumasi
Attendance: 30,000
Referee: Koman Coulibaly (Mali)
10 October 2004
16:30 UTC+0

Uganda	0–1	South Africa
	Report	McCarthy 68' (pen.)

National Stadium, Kampala
Attendance: 50,000
Referee: Michel Gasingwa (Rwanda)

26 March 2005
15:45 UTC+2

South Africa	2–1	Uganda
Fortune 21' (pen.); Pienaar 71'	Report	Obua 63' (pen.)

FNB Stadium, Johannesburg
Attendance: 20,000
Referee: Chukwudi Chukwujekwu (Nigeria)
26 March 2005
18:00 UTC+0

Burkina Faso	1–2	Cape Verde
Dagano 71'	Report	Caló 48', 87'

Stade du 4 Août, Ouagadougou
Attendance: 27,500
Referee: Divine Evehe (Cameroon)
27 March 2005
15:30 UTC+1

DR Congo	1–1	Ghana
Nonda 50'	Report	Gyan 30'

Stade des Martyrs, Kinshasa
Attendance: 80,000
Referee: Modou Sowe (Gambia)

4 June 2005
16:00 UTC−1

Cape Verde	1–2	South Africa
Cafú 77'	Report	McCarthy 10'; Buckley 12'

Estádio da Várzea, Praia
Attendance: 6,000
Referee: Mohamed Benouza (Algeria)
5 June 2005
15:00 UTC+0

Ghana	2–1	Burkina Faso
Appiah 66'; Amoah 83'	Report	Dagano 30'

Baba Yara Stadium, Kumasi
Attendance: 11,920
Referee: Essam Abdel-Fatah (Egypt)
5 June 2005
15:30 UTC+1

DR Congo	4–0	Uganda
Nonda 2', 69' (pen.); Ilongo 58'; Matumona 78'	Report

Stade des Martyrs, Kinshasa
Attendance: 80,000
Referee: Mourad Daami (Tunisia)

18 June 2005
15:30 UTC+2

South Africa	0–2	Ghana
	Report	Amoah 59'; Essien 91'

FNB Stadium, Johannesburg
Attendance: 50,000
Referee: Mohamed Guezzaz (Morocco)
18 June 2005
16:30 UTC+3

Uganda	1–0	Cape Verde
Sserunkuma 36'	Report

National Stadium, Kampala
Attendance: 5,000
Referee: Kubrom Kidane (Eritrea)
18 June 2005
18:00 UTC+0

Burkina Faso	2–0	DR Congo
Panandétiguiri 3'; Dagano 68'	Report

Stade du 4 Août, Ouagadougou
Attendance: 25,000
Referee: Abdullhakim Shelmani (Libya)

3 September 2005
18:00 UTC+0

Burkina Faso	3–1	South Africa
Cissé 32', 47'; Kébé 39'	Report	Zuma 75'

Stade du 4 Août, Ouagadougou
Attendance: 25,000
Referee: Coffi Codjia (Benin)
4 September 2005
15:30 UTC+1

DR Congo	2–1	Cape Verde
Kitambala 21'; Mputu 49'	Report	Caló 24'

Stade des Martyrs, Kinshasa
Attendance: 75,000
Referee: Mohamed Guezzaz (Morocco)
4 September 2005
16:30 UTC+0

Ghana	2–0	Uganda
Essien 10'; Amoah 15'	Report

Baba Yara Stadium, Kumasi
Attendance: 45,000
Referee: Jean-Marie Hicuburundi (Burundi)

8 October 2005
14:00 UTC−1

Cape Verde	0–4	Ghana
	Report	Frimpong 5'; Muntari 35'; Gyan 75'; Attram 87'

Estádio da Várzea, Praia
Attendance: 6,500
Referee: Mourad Daami (Tunisia)
8 October 2005
17:00 UTC+2

South Africa	2–2	DR Congo
Zuma 5', 52'	Report	Mputu 11'; Nonda 44'

Kings Park Stadium, Durban
Attendance: 35,000
Referee: Jean-Olivier Mbera (Gabon)
8 October 2005
18:00 UTC+3

Uganda	2–2	Burkina Faso
Masaba 30' (pen.); Sserunkuma 71'	Report	Kébé 15'; Rouamba 75'

National Stadium, Kampala
Attendance: 1,433
Referee: Mohamed Benouza (Algeria)

== Group 3 ==
Pos	Team	Pld	W	D	L	GF	GA	GD	Pts	Qualification	(Ivory Coast)	(Cameroon)	(Egypt)	(Libya)	(Sudan)	(Benin)
1	Ivory Coast	10	7	1	2	20	7	+13	22	2006 FIFA World Cup and 2006 Africa Cup of Nations	—	2–3	2–0	2–0	5–0	3–0
2	Cameroon	10	6	3	1	18	10	+8	21	2006 Africa Cup of Nations	2–0	—	1–1	1–0	2–1	2–1
3	Egypt (Note: Egypt had already qualified directly to the Africa Cup of Nations as hosts, leaving Libya, the fourth-placed team, to qualify to the Africa Cup of Nations.)	10	5	2	3	26	15	+11	17	2006 Africa Cup of Nations	1–2	3–2	—	4–1	6–1	4–1
4	Libya	10	3	3	4	8	10	−2	12	2006 Africa Cup of Nations	0–0	0–0	2–1	—	0–0	4–1
5	Sudan	10	1	3	6	6	22	−16	6		1–3	1–1	0–3	0–1	—	1–0
6	Benin	10	1	2	7	9	23	−14	5		0–1	1–4	3–3	1–0	1–1	—

Rules for classification: Tiebreakers
Notes:
6 June 2004
15:30

Cameroon	2–1	Benin
Eto'o 42'; Song 45'	Report	S. Tchomogo 11'

Ahmadou Ahidjo Stadium, Yaoundé
Attendance: 40,000
Referee: Jean-Olivier Mbera (Gabon)
6 June 2004
16:00

Ivory Coast	2–0	Libya
Dindane 35'; Drogba 63' (pen.)	Report

Stade Félix Houphouët-Boigny, Abidjan
Attendance: 40,827
Referee: Eugenio Colembi (Angola)
6 June 2004
20:00

Sudan	0–3	Egypt
	Report	Ali 6'; Aboutrika 53'; Abdelwahab 88'

Khartoum Stadium, Khartoum
Attendance: 10,000
Referee: Kubrom Kidane (Eritrea)

18 June 2004
19:30

Libya	0–0	Cameroon
	Report

9 July Stadium, Misrata
Attendance: 7,000
Referee: Lim Kee Chong (Mauritius)
20 June 2004
16:00

Benin	1–1	Sudan
Ogunbiyi 30'	Report	Abdel Aziz 45+2'

Stade de l'Amitié, Cotonou
Attendance: 20,000
Referee: Mohamed Guezzaz (Morocco)
20 June 2004
20:00

Egypt	1–2	Ivory Coast
Aboutrika 55'	Report	Dindane 22'; Drogba 75'

Alexandria Stadium, Alexandria
Attendance: 13,000
Referee: Hichem Guirat (Tunisia)

3 July 2004
20:00

Sudan	0–1	Libya
	Report	Kara 90+3'

Khartoum Stadium, Khartoum
Attendance: 10,000
Referee: Daniel Bennett (South Africa)
4 July 2004
15:30

Cameroon	2–0	Ivory Coast
Eto'o 80'; Feutchine 82'	Report

Ahmadou Ahidjo Stadium, Yaoundé
Attendance: 40,000
Referee: Mohamed Guezzaz (Morocco)
4 July 2004
16:00

Benin	3–3	Egypt
O. Tchomogo 8' (pen.); Ahouéya 46'; Ogunbiyi 68'	Report	Hassan 66'; Aboutrika 75'; Mostafa 80'

Stade de l'Amitié, Cotonou
Attendance: 15,000
Referee: Chukwudi Chukwujekwu (Nigeria)

3 September 2004
19:00

Libya	4–1	Benin
Al Shibani 9'; Kara 47'; A. Osman 51'; Al Ramly 70'	Report	Osseni 12'

June 11 Stadium, Tripoli
Attendance: 30,000
Referee: Kubrom Kidane (Eritrea)
5 September 2004
16:00

Ivory Coast	5–0	Sudan
Drogba 12' (pen.); Dindane 15', 64'; Yapi Yapo 25'; Koné 56'	Report

Stade Félix Houphouët-Boigny, Abidjan
Attendance: 20,000
Referee: Sule Mana (Nigeria)
5 September 2004
20:00

Egypt	3–2	Cameroon
Shawky 45'; Hassan 74'; T. El-Said 86'	Report	Tchato 88'; Eto'o 89'

Osman Ahmed Osman Stadium, Cairo
Attendance: 25,000
Referee: Lim Kee Chong (Mauritius)

8 October 2004
19:00

Libya	2–1	Egypt
Kara 31'; A. Osman 85'	Report	Zaki 57'

June 11 Stadium, Tripoli
Attendance: 80,000
Referee: Djamel Haimoudi (Algeria)
9 October 2004
20:30

Sudan	1–1	Cameroon
Agab 17'	Report	Job 90+2'

Al-Merrikh Stadium, Omdurman
Attendance: 30,000
Referee: Buenkadila Wabelo Bisingu (Congo DR)
10 October 2004
16:00

Benin	0–1	Ivory Coast
	Report	Dindane 48'

Stade de l'Amitié, Cotonou
Attendance: 25,000
Referee: Modou Sowe (Gambia)

27 March 2005
15:30

Cameroon	2–1	Sudan
Geremi 34'; Webó 90'	Report	Tambal 41'

Ahmadou Ahidjo Stadium, Yaoundé
Attendance: 30,000
Referee: Badara Diatta (Senegal)
27 March 2005
16:00

Ivory Coast	3–0	Benin
Kalou 7'; Drogba 19', 59'	Report

Stade Félix Houphouët-Boigny, Abidjan
Attendance: 35,000
Referee: Hichem Guirat (Tunisia)
27 March 2005
20:00

Egypt	4–1	Libya
Mido 55'; Moteab 56', 81'; Hassan 76'	Report	Ferjani 50'

Osman Ahmed Osman Stadium, Cairo
Attendance: 30,000
Referee: Éric Poulat (France)

3 June 2005
19:00

Libya	0–0	Ivory Coast
	Report

June 11 Stadium, Tripoli
Attendance: 45,000
Referee: Lim Kee Chong (Mauritius)
4 June 2005
16:00

Benin	1–4	Cameroon
Agbessi 81'	Report	Song 19'; Webó 51'; Geremi 64'; Eto'o 69'

Stade de l'Amitié, Cotonou
Attendance: 20,000
Referee: Abderrahim El Arjoun (Morocco)
5 June 2005
21:00

Egypt	6–1	Sudan
Ali 8', 31'; Zaki 28', 50'; T. El-Said 86'; Abdel Malek 71'	Report	Tambal 83'

Osman Ahmed Osman Stadium, Cairo
Attendance: 20,000
Referee: Joseph Mususa (Zimbabwe)

19 June 2005
15:30

Cameroon	1–0	Libya
Webó 37'	Report

Ahmadou Ahidjo Stadium, Yaoundé
Attendance: 36,000
Referee: Koman Coulibaly (Mali)
19 June 2005
16:00

Ivory Coast	2–0	Egypt
Drogba 41', 49'	Report

Stade Félix Houphouët-Boigny, Abidjan
Attendance: 30,000
Referee: Jerome Damon (South Africa)
17 August 2005
20:30

Sudan	1–0	Benin
Tambal 20'	Report

Al-Merrikh Stadium, Omdurman
Attendance: 12,000
Referee: Eddy Maillet (Seychelles)

2 September 2005
19:00

Libya	0–0	Sudan
	Report

June 11 Stadium, Tripoli
Attendance: 20,000
Referee: Lassina Paré (Burkina Faso)
4 September 2005
16:00

Ivory Coast	2–3	Cameroon
Drogba 38', 47'	Report	Webó 30', 45+2', 85'

Stade Félix Houphouët-Boigny, Abidjan
Attendance: 34,500
Referee: Mourad Daami (Tunisia)
4 September 2005
20:30

Egypt	4–1	Benin
Zaki 12', 15', 84'; Mido 71'	Report	Sessègnon 60'

Osman Ahmed Osman Stadium, Cairo
Attendance: 5,000
Referee: Buenkadila Wabelo Bisingu (Congo DR)

8 October 2005
16:00

Cameroon	1–1	Egypt
Douala 20'	Report	Shawky 79'

Ahmadou Ahidjo Stadium, Yaoundé
Attendance: 38,750
Referee: Koman Coulibaly (Mali)
8 October 2005
18:00

Sudan	1–3	Ivory Coast
Tambal 89' (pen.)	Report	Akalé 22'; Dindane 51', 73'

Al-Merrikh Stadium, Omdurman
Attendance: 20,000
Referee: Jerome Damon (South Africa)
9 October 2005
16:00

Benin	1–0	Libya
R. Chitou 60'	Report

Stade René Pleven d'Akpakpa, Cotonou
Attendance: 1,880
Referee: Joseph Mususa (Zimbabwe)

== Group 4 ==
Pos	Team	Pld	W	D	L	GF	GA	GD	Pts	Qualification	(Angola)	(Nigeria)	(Zimbabwe)	(Gabon)	(Algeria)	(Rwanda)
1	Angola	10	6	3	1	12	6	+6	21 (Note: Head-to-head points: Angola 4, Nigeria 1.)	2006 FIFA World Cup and 2006 Africa Cup of Nations	—	1–0	1–0	3–0	2–1	1–0
2	Nigeria	10	6	3	1	21	7	+14	21	2006 Africa Cup of Nations	1–1	—	5–1	2–0	1–0	2–0
3	Zimbabwe	10	4	3	3	13	14	−1	15	2006 Africa Cup of Nations	2–0	0–3	—	1–0	1–1	3–1
4	Gabon	10	2	4	4	11	13	−2	10		2–2	1–1	1–1	—	0–0	3–0
5	Algeria	10	1	5	4	8	15	−7	8		0–0	2–5	2–2	0–3	—	1–0
6	Rwanda	10	1	2	7	6	16	−10	5		0–1	1–1	0–2	3–1	1–1	—

Rules for classification: Tiebreakers
Notes:
5 June 2004
16:00

Gabon	1–1	Zimbabwe
T. Nguema 52'	Report	Kaondera 82'

Stade Omar Bongo, Libreville
Attendance: 25,000
Referee: Alex Quartey (Ghana)
5 June 2004
16:00

Nigeria	2–0	Rwanda
Martins 55', 88'	Report

Abuja Stadium, Abuja
Attendance: 35,000
Referee: Lassina Paré (Burkina Faso)
5 June 2004
19:00

Algeria	0–0	Angola
	Report

Stade 19 Mai 1956, Annaba
Attendance: 55,000
Referee: Mourad Daami (Tunisia)

19 June 2004
16:00

Rwanda	3–1	Gabon
Saïd 4', 64'; Mulisa 27'	Report	T. Nguema 20'

Stade Amahoro, Kigali
Attendance: 16,325
Referee: Isaack Abdulkadir (Tanzania)
20 June 2004
15:00

Zimbabwe	1–1	Algeria
Raho 60' (o.g.)	Report	Cherrad 3'

National Sports Stadium, Harare
Attendance: 65,000
Referee: Wa Ntambidila (Congo DR)
20 June 2004
15:30

Angola	1–0	Nigeria
Akwá 84'	Report

Estádio da Cidadela, Luanda
Attendance: 40,000
Referee: Aaron Nkole (Zambia)

3 July 2004
16:00

Nigeria	1–0	Algeria
Yobo 84'	Report

Abuja Stadium, Abuja
Attendance: 35,000
Referee: Ladoual Hisseine (Chad)
3 July 2004
16:00

Rwanda	0–2	Zimbabwe
	Report	P. Ndlovu 41'; Nengomasha 79'

Stade Amahoro, Kigali
Attendance: 13,000
Referee: Youngson Chilinda (Malawi)
3 July 2004
16:00

Gabon	2–2	Angola
Issiémou 44'; T. Nguema 49'	Report	Akwá 19'; Marco Paulo 81'

Stade Omar Bongo, Libreville
Attendance: 20,000
Referee: René Louzaya (Congo)

5 September 2004
15:00

Zimbabwe	0–3	Nigeria
	Report	Aghahowa 3'; Enakarhire 28'; Yakubu 48' (pen.)

National Sports Stadium, Harare
Attendance: 60,000
Referee: Joseph Mandzioukouta (Congo)
5 September 2004
15:30

Angola	1–0	Rwanda
Freddy 52'	Report

Estádio da Cidadela, Luanda
Attendance: 30,000
Referee: Jerome Damon (South Africa)
5 September 2004
20:15

Algeria	0–3	Gabon
	Report	Aubameyang 56'; Akieremy 73'; Bito'o 84'

Stade 19 Mai 1956, Annaba
Attendance: 51,000
Referee: Falla N'Doye (Senegal)

9 October 2004
16:00

Rwanda	1–1	Algeria
Saïd 9'	Report	Bourahli 14'

Stade Amahoro, Kigali
Attendance: 20,000
Referee: Khalid Abdel Rahman (Sudan)
9 October 2004
16:30

Gabon	1–1	Nigeria
Issiémou 29'	Report	Yakubu 50'

Stade Omar Bongo, Libreville
Attendance: 26,000
Referee: Koudougou Yameogo (Burkina Faso)
10 October 2004
15:30

Angola	1–0	Zimbabwe
Flávio 53'	Report

Estádio da Cidadela, Luanda
Attendance: 17,000
Referee: Verson Lwanja (Malawi)

26 March 2005
19:00

Nigeria	2–0	Gabon
Aghahowa 79'; Kanu 81'	Report

Liberation Stadium, Port Harcourt
Attendance: 16,489
Referee: Jean-Marie Hicuburundi (Burundi)
27 March 2005
15:00

Zimbabwe	2–0	Angola
Kaondera 59'; Benjani 73'	Report

National Sports Stadium, Harare
Attendance: 40,894
Referee: Coffi Codjia (Benin)
27 March 2005
19:00

Algeria	1–0	Rwanda
Boutabout 48'	Report

Stade Ahmed Zabana, Oran
Attendance: 45,000
Referee: Essam Abdel-Fatah (Egypt)

5 June 2005
15:00

Zimbabwe	1–0	Gabon
P. Ndlovu 52'	Report

National Sports Stadium, Harare
Attendance: 55,000
Referee: Muhmed Ssegonga (Uganda)
5 June 2005
15:30

Angola	2–1	Algeria
Flávio 50'; Akwá 58'	Report	Boutabout 63'

Estádio da Cidadela, Luanda
Attendance: 27,000
Referee: Jean-Marie Hicuburundi (Burundi)
5 June 2005
16:00

Rwanda	1–1	Nigeria
Gatete 53'	Report	Martins 78'

Stade Amahoro, Kigali
Attendance: 30,000
Referee: Kubrom Kidane (Eritrea)

18 June 2005
16:00

Gabon	3–0	Rwanda
Djissikadie 10'; Londo 55'; T. Nguema 60'	Report

Stade Omar Bongo, Libreville
Attendance: 10,000
Referee: Abderrahim El Arjoun (Morocco)
18 June 2005
16:00

Nigeria	1–1	Angola
Okocha 5'	Report	Figueiredo 60'

Sani Abacha Stadium, Kano
Attendance: 17,000
Referee: Essam Abdel-Fatah (Egypt)
19 June 2005
20:30

Algeria	2–2	Zimbabwe
Yahia 17'; Daoud 48'	Report	Kaondera 33'; P. Ndlovu 87'

Stade Ahmed Zabana, Oran
Attendance: 15,000
Referee: Lassina Paré (Burkina Faso)

4 September 2005
15:00

Angola	3–0	Gabon
Nsi-Akoue 25' (o.g.); Mantorras 44'; Zé Kalanga 89'	Report

Estádio da Cidadela, Luanda
Attendance: 35,000
Referee: Koman Coulibaly (Mali)
4 September 2005
15:00

Zimbabwe	3–1	Rwanda
Kaondera 4'; Benjani 43'; Rambanapasi 78'	Report	Makonese 30' (o.g.)

National Sports Stadium, Harare
Attendance: 55,000
Referee: Muhmed Ssegonga (Uganda)
4 September 2005
20:30

Algeria	2–5	Nigeria
Yacef 48'; Boutabout 58'	Report	Martins 20' (pen.), 88', 90'; Utaka 42'; Obodo 81'

Stade Ahmed Zabana, Oran
Attendance: 11,000
Referee: Abdul-Hakim Al-Shalmani (Libya)

8 October 2005
15:00

Nigeria	5–1	Zimbabwe
Martins 35', 75' (pen.); Yussuf 62'; Kanu 80' (pen.); Odemwingie 89'	Report	Benjani 70'

Abuja Stadium, Abuja
Attendance: 45,000
Referee: Lassina Paré (Burkina Faso)
8 October 2005
15:30

Gabon	0–0	Algeria
	Report

Stade Pierre Claver Divounguy, Port-Gentil
Attendance: 37,000
Referee: Ousmane Diouf (Senegal)
8 October 2005
16:00

Rwanda	0–1	Angola
	Report	Akwá 79'

Stade Amahoro, Kigali
Attendance: 25,000
Referee: Mohamed Guezzaz (Morocco)

== Group 5 ==
Pos	Team	Pld	W	D	L	GF	GA	GD	Pts	Qualification	(Tunisia)	(Morocco)	(Guinea)	(Kenya)	(Botswana)	(Malawi)
1	Tunisia	10	6	3	1	25	9	+16	21	2006 FIFA World Cup and 2006 Africa Cup of Nations	—	2–2	2–0	1–0	4–1	7–0
2	Morocco	10	5	5	0	17	7	+10	20	2006 Africa Cup of Nations	1–1	—	1–0	5–1	1–0	4–1
3	Guinea	10	5	2	3	15	10	+5	17	2006 Africa Cup of Nations	2–1	1–1	—	1–0	4–0	3–1
4	Kenya	10	3	1	6	8	17	−9	10		0–2	0–0	2–1	—	1–0	3–2
5	Botswana	10	3	0	7	10	18	−8	9		1–3	0–1	1–2	2–1	—	2–0
6	Malawi	10	1	3	6	12	26	−14	6		2–2	1–1	1–1	3–0	1–3	—

Rules for classification: Tiebreakers
5 June 2004
15:00

Malawi	1–1	Morocco
Munthali 35'	Report	Safri 25'

Kamuzu Stadium, Blantyre
Attendance: 30,040
Referee: Joseph Mususa (Zimbabwe)
5 June 2004
19:15

Tunisia	4–1	Botswana
Clayton 9'; Haggui 35', 79'; Zitouni 74'	Report	Selolwane 65'

Stade 7 November, Tunis
Attendance: 2,844
Referee: Khalid Abdel Rahman (Sudan)
17 November 2004 (Note: Many of Kenya's matches were delayed.)
16:00

Kenya	2–1	Guinea
Oliech 10'; Mukenya 61'	Report	Feindouno 19' (pen.)

Nyayo National Stadium, Nairobi
Attendance: 16,000
Referee: Essam Abdel-Fatah (Egypt)

19 June 2004
15:00

Botswana	2–0	Malawi
Selolwane 7'; Gabolwelwe 25'	Report

Botswana National Stadium, Gaborone
Attendance: 15,000
Referee: Yusuf Awuye (Uganda)
20 June 2004
16:30

Guinea	2–1	Tunisia
Diawara 12', 46'	Report	Braham 67'

Stade 28 Septembre, Conakry
Attendance: 15,300
Referee: Coffi Codjia (Benin)
9 February 2005
19:30

Morocco	5–1	Kenya
Zairi 12', 39', 90'; Diane 46'; Hadji 81'	Report	Otieno 90+3'

Prince Moulay Abdellah Stadium, Rabat
Attendance: 40,000
Referee: Wahid Tamuni (Libya)

3 July 2004
15:00

Malawi	1–1	Guinea
Mpinganjira 71'	Report	Diawara 80'

Kamuzu Stadium, Blantyre
Attendance: 11,383
Referee: Isaack Abdulkadir (Tanzania)
3 July 2004
15:00

Botswana	0–1	Morocco
	Report	Mokhtari 30'

Botswana National Stadium, Gaborone
Attendance: 22,000
Referee: Gilbert Dlamini (Swaziland)
17 August 2005
20:45

Tunisia	1–0	Kenya
Guemamdia 2'	Report

Stade 7 November, Tunis
Attendance: 60,000
Referee: Divine Evehe (Cameroon)

4 September 2004
16:00

Kenya	3–2	Malawi
Barasa 21', 29'; Oliech 25'	Report	Munthali 41'; Mabedi 90' (pen.)

Moi International Sports Centre, Nairobi
Attendance: 13,000
Referee: Cornelius Mwanza (Zambia)
4 September 2004
19:30

Morocco	1–1	Tunisia
El Karkouri 74'	Report	Santos 11'

Prince Moulay Abdellah Stadium, Rabat
Attendance: 45,000
Referee: Ahmed Auda (Egypt)
5 September 2004
16:30

Guinea	4–0	Botswana
Feindouno 44'; Youla 54'; Diawara 60'; Mansaré 82'	Report

Stade 28 Septembre, Conakry
Attendance: 25,000
Referee: Justus Agbenyega (Ghana)

9 October 2004
15:00

Malawi	2–2	Tunisia
Mwafulirwa 19'; Chipatala 37'	Report	Jaziri 82'; Ghodhbane 89'

Kamuzu Stadium, Blantyre
Attendance: 20,000
Referee: Yusuf Awuye (Uganda)
9 October 2004
16:00

Botswana	2–1	Kenya
Molwantwa 51'; Selolwane 58'	Report	Oliech 5'

Botswana National Stadium, Gaborone
Attendance: 16,500
Referee: Eugenio Colembi (Angola)
10 October 2004
16:30

Guinea	1–1	Morocco
Mansaré 50'	Report	Chamakh 5'

Stade 28 Septembre, Conakry
Attendance: 25,000
Referee: Manuel Monteiro Duarte (Cape Verde)

26 March 2005
16:00

Kenya	1–0	Botswana
Oliech 44'	Report

Moi International Sports Centre, Nairobi
Attendance: 15,000
Referee: Buenkadila Wabelo Bisingu (Congo DR)
26 March 2005
19:15

Tunisia	7–0	Malawi
Guemamdia 3'; Santos 12', 52', 75', 77'; Clayton 60' (pen.); Ghodhbane 80'	Report

Stade 7 November, Tunis
Attendance: 30,000
Referee: Khalid Abdel Rahman (Sudan)
26 March 2005
19:30

Morocco	1–0	Guinea
Hadji 62'	Report

Prince Moulay Abdellah Stadium, Rabat
Attendance: 70,000
Referee: Koman Coulibaly (Mali)

4 June 2005
15:00

Botswana	1–3	Tunisia
Gabonamong 12'	Report	Nafti 27'; Santos 43'; Abdy 78'

Botswana National Stadium, Gaborone
Attendance: 20,000
Referee: Sule Mana (Nigeria)
4 June 2005
20:00

Morocco	4–1	Malawi
Safri 16' (pen.); Hadji 21', 75'; Kharja 72'	Report	Chipatala 10'

Prince Moulay Abdellah Stadium, Rabat
Attendance: 48,000
Referee: Buenkadila Wabelo Bisingu (Congo DR)
5 June 2005
16:30

Guinea	1–0	Kenya
S. Bangoura 68'	Report

Stade 28 Septembre, Conakry
Attendance: 21,000
Referee: Jean-Olivier Mbera (Gabon)

11 June 2005
19:15

Tunisia	2–0	Guinea
Clayton 36' (pen.); Chedli 78'	Report

Stade 7 November, Tunis
Attendance: 30,000
Referee: Lim Kee Chong (Mauritius)
18 June 2005
15:00

Malawi	1–3	Botswana
Mwafulirwa 48'	Report	Molwantwa 8'; Selolwane 40'; Motlhabankwe 88'

Kamuzu Stadium, Blantyre
Attendance: 20,000
Referee: Divine Evehe (Cameroon)
18 June 2005
16:00

Kenya	0–0	Morocco
	Report

Nyayo National Stadium, Nairobi
Attendance: 50,000
Referee: Badara Diatta (Senegal)

3 September 2005
16:00

Kenya	0–2	Tunisia
	Report	Guemamdia 2'; Jemâa 85'

Moi International Sports Centre, Nairobi
Attendance: 0 (Note: Due to unruly behaviour and a stampede killing one person in the match against Morocco, this match was played behind closed doors.)
Referee: Modou Sowe (Gambia)
3 September 2005
20:00

Morocco	1–0	Botswana
El Karkouri 56'	Report

Prince Moulay Abdellah Stadium, Rabat
Attendance: 25,000
Referee: Mohamed Benouza (Algeria)
4 September 2005
16:30

Guinea	3–1	Malawi
Feindouno 12'; Diawara 36'; S. Bangoura 67'	Report	Mkandawire 37'

Stade 28 Septembre, Conakry
Attendance: 2,518
Referee: Sule Mana (Nigeria)

8 October 2005
15:00

Malawi	3–0	Kenya
Zakazaka 6'; Mkandawire 49', 61'	Report

Kamuzu Stadium, Blantyre
Attendance: 12,000
Referee: Coffi Codjia (Benin)
8 October 2005
16:00

Botswana	1–2	Guinea
Molwantwa 35'	Report	O. Bangoura 73', 76'

Botswana National Stadium, Gaborone
Attendance: 16,800
Referee: Modou Sowe (Gambia)
8 October 2005
20:45

Tunisia	2–2	Morocco
Clayton 18' (pen.); Chedli 69'	Report	Chamakh 3'; El Karkouri 42'

Stade 7 November, Tunis
Attendance: 60,000
Referee: Essam Abdel-Fatah (Egypt)

== Goalscorers ==
There were 397 goals scored in 150 matches, for an average of 2.65 goals per match.

10 goals

- (Togo) Emmanuel Adebayor

9 goals

- (Ivory Coast) Didier Drogba

8 goals

- (Nigeria) Obafemi Martins

7 goals

- (Ivory Coast) Aruna Dindane
- (Senegal) Henri Camara

6 goals

- (Cameroon) Pierre Webó
- (Egypt) Amr Zaki
- (Tunisia) Francileudo Santos

5 goals

- (Burkina Faso) Moumouni Dagano
- (Guinea) Kaba Diawara
- (Zambia) Collins Mbesuma

4 goals

- (Angola) Akwá
- (Botswana) Tshepiso Molwantwa
- (Cameroon) Samuel Eto'o
- (Republic of the Congo) Armel Disney
- (Democratic Republic of the Congo) Shabani Nonda
- (Gabon) Théodore Nzue Nguema
- (Kenya) Dennis Oliech
- (Morocco) Youssouf Hadji
- (Senegal) El Hadji Diouf
- (Sudan) Haytham Tambal
- (Tunisia) José Clayton
- (Zimbabwe) Shingayi Kaondera

3 goals

- (Algeria) Mansour Boutabout
- (Botswana) Dipsy Selolwane
- (Cape Verde) Cafú
- (Cape Verde) Carlos Caló
- (Egypt) Mohamed Aboutrika
- (Egypt) Abdel Halim Ali
- (Egypt) Ahmed Hassan
- (Ghana) Matthew Amoah
- (Ghana) Stephen Appiah
- (Ghana) Michael Essien
- (Ghana) Asamoah Gyan
- (Guinea) Pascal Feindouno
- (Libya) Nader Kara
- (Malawi) Noel Mkandawire
- (Morocco) Marouane Chamakh
- (Morocco) Talal El Karkouri
- (Morocco) Jaouad Zairi
- (Rwanda) Abedi Saïd
- (South Africa) Sibusiso Zuma
- (Togo) Mohamed Kader
- (Togo) Chérif Touré
- (Tunisia) Haykel Guemamdia
- (Zimbabwe) Benjani Mwaruwari
- (Zimbabwe) Peter Ndlovu

2 goals

- (Angola) Flávio
- (Benin) Mouritala Ogunbiyi
- (Burkina Faso) Abdoulaye Cissé
- (Burkina Faso) Yahia Kébé
- (Cameroon) Geremi
- (Cameroon) Rigobert Song
- (Republic of the Congo) Rudy Bhebey
- (Republic of the Congo) Michel Bouanga
- (Democratic Republic of the Congo) Trésor Mputu
- (Egypt) Tarek El-Said
- (Egypt) Mido
- (Egypt) Emad Moteab
- (Egypt) Mohamed Shawky
- (Gabon) Thierry Issiémou
- (Ghana) Sulley Muntari
- (Guinea) Ousmane Bangoura
- (Guinea) Sambégou Bangoura
- (Guinea) Fodé Mansaré
- (Kenya) John Barasa
- (Libya) Ahmed Saad Osman
- (Malawi) Emmanuel Chipatala
- (Malawi) Heston Munthali
- (Malawi) Russel Mwafulirwa
- (Mali) Dramane Coulibaly
- (Mali) Soumaila Coulibaly
- (Mali) Frédéric Kanouté
- (Nigeria) Julius Aghahowa
- (Nigeria) Nwankwo Kanu
- (Nigeria) Yakubu
- (Senegal) Papa Bouba Diop
- (Senegal) Moussa N'Diaye
- (South Africa) Mbulelo Mabizela
- (South Africa) Benni McCarthy
- (South Africa) Steven Pienaar
- (Togo) Yao Junior Sènaya
- (Tunisia) Adel Chedli
- (Tunisia) Kaies Ghodhbane
- (Tunisia) Karim Haggui
- (Uganda) David Obua
- (Uganda) Geoffrey Sserunkuma
- (Zambia) Ignatius Lwipa
- (Zambia) Nchimunya Mweetwa

1 goal

- (Algeria) Isâad Bourahli
- (Algeria) Abdelmalek Cherrad
- (Algeria) Sofiane Daoud
- (Algeria) Hamza Yacef
- (Algeria) Antar Yahia
- (Angola) Paulo Figueiredo
- (Angola) Freddy
- (Angola) Mantorras
- (Angola) Rebelo Lopes
- (Angola) Zé Kalanga
- (Benin) Coffi Agbessi
- (Benin) Jocelyn Ahouéya
- (Benin) Rachad Chitou
- (Benin) Bachirou Osseni
- (Benin) Stéphane Sessègnon
- (Benin) Oumar Tchomogo
- (Benin) Séïdath Tchomogo
- (Botswana) Nelson Gabolwelwe
- (Botswana) Mogogi Gabonamong
- (Botswana) Tshepo Motlhabankwe
- (Burkina Faso) Abdoul-Aziz Nikiema
- (Burkina Faso) Saïdou Panandétiguiri
- (Burkina Faso) Florent Rouamba
- (Burkina Faso) Amadou Touré
- (Burkina Faso) Mamadou Zongo
- (Cameroon) Roudolphe Douala
- (Cameroon) Guy Feutchine
- (Cameroon) Joseph-Désiré Job
- (Cameroon) Bill Tchato
- (Cape Verde) Janício Martins
- (Cape Verde) Jimmy Modeste
- (Republic of the Congo) Gervais Batota
- (Republic of the Congo) Bertrand Bouity
- (Democratic Republic of the Congo) Dikilu Bageta
- (Democratic Republic of the Congo) Mbala Mbuta Biscotte
- (Democratic Republic of the Congo) Ngasanya Ilongo
- (Democratic Republic of the Congo) Djoko Kaluyituka
- (Democratic Republic of the Congo) Cyrille Kitambala
- (Democratic Republic of the Congo) Zola Matumona
- (Democratic Republic of the Congo) Marcel Kimemba Mbayo
- (Democratic Republic of the Congo) Kabamba Musasa
- (Egypt) Ahmed Eid Abdel Malek
- (Egypt) Mohamed Abdelwahab
- (Egypt) Hassan Mostafa
- (Gabon) Georges Akieremy
- (Gabon) Catilina Aubameyang
- (Gabon) Etienne Bito'o
- (Gabon) Etienne Alain Djissikadie
- (Gabon) Dieudonné Londo
- (Ghana) Godwin Attram
- (Ghana) Joetex Frimpong
- (Guinea) Souleymane Youla
- (Ivory Coast) Kanga Akalé
- (Ivory Coast) Bonaventure Kalou
- (Ivory Coast) Bakari Koné
- (Ivory Coast) Gilles Yapi Yapo
- (Kenya) Edwin Mukenya
- (Kenya) Musa Otieno
- (Liberia) Alvin Kieh
- (Liberia) Arcadia Toe
- (Liberia) Isaac Tondo
- (Libya) Marei Al Ramly
- (Libya) Younes Al Shibani
- (Libya) Othman Ferjani
- (Malawi) Patrick Mabedi
- (Malawi) Albert Mpinganjira
- (Malawi) Jimmy Zakazaka
- (Mali) Abdoulaye Demba
- (Mali) Mamadou Diallo
- (Mali) Souleymane Diamoutene
- (Mali) Mahamadou Diarra
- (Mali) Mohamed Sissoko
- (Morocco) Mounir Diane
- (Morocco) Houssine Kharja
- (Morocco) Youssef Mokhtari
- (Morocco) Youssef Safri
- (Nigeria) Joseph Enakarhire
- (Nigeria) Christian Obodo
- (Nigeria) Peter Odemwingie
- (Nigeria) Jay-Jay Okocha
- (Nigeria) John Utaka
- (Nigeria) Joseph Yobo
- (Nigeria) Ayila Yussuf
- (Rwanda) Jimmy Gatete
- (Rwanda) Jimmy Mulisa
- (Senegal) Papa Dia
- (Senegal) Abdoulaye Faye
- (Senegal) Lamine Diatta
- (Senegal) Khalilou Fadiga
- (Senegal) Babacar Gueye
- (Senegal) Mamadou Niang
- (South Africa) Shaun Bartlett
- (South Africa) Delron Buckley
- (South Africa) Quinton Fortune
- (Sudan) Amar Ramadan
- (Sudan) Faisal Agab
- (Togo) Adékambi Olufadé
- (Togo) Moustapha Salifou
- (Tunisia) Najeh Braham
- (Tunisia) Wisam El Abdy
- (Tunisia) Ziad Jaziri
- (Tunisia) Issam Jemâa
- (Tunisia) Mehdi Nafti
- (Tunisia) Ali Zitouni
- (Uganda) Simon Masaba
- (Uganda) Ibrahim Sekagya
- (Zambia) Kalusha Bwalya
- (Zambia) Linos Chalwe
- (Zambia) Gift Kampamba
- (Zambia) Harry Milanzi
- (Zambia) Jacob Mulenga
- (Zambia) Mumamba Numba
- (Zambia) Elijah Tana
- (Zimbabwe) Tinashe Nengomasha
- (Zimbabwe) Ashley Rambanapasi

1 own goal

- (Algeria) Slimane Raho (against Zimbabwe)
- (Cape Verde) Nélson Veiga (against Ghana)
- (Gabon) René Nsi-Akoue (against Angola)
- (Zimbabwe) Zvenyika Makonese (against Rwanda)
