= 2007 Men's Youth World Handball Championship =

Handball tournament in Bahrain

2007 Youth World Championship

Tournament details
- Host country: Bahrain
- Venues: 2 (in 1 host city)
- Dates: July 26 – August 3
- Teams: 16 (from 5 confederations)

Final positions
- Champions: Denmark (1st title)
- Runners-up: Croatia
- Third place: Sweden
- Fourth place: Argentina

Tournament statistics
- Matches played: 50
- Goals scored: 3,006 (60.12 per match)
- Top scorer: (South Korea) Shin Seung-Il (57)

The 2007 Men's Youth World Handball Championship (2nd tournament) took place in Bahrain from 26 July–3 August.

== Preliminary round ==
=== Group A ===
Team	Pld	W	D	L	GF	GA	GD	Pts
Poland	3	3	0	0	104	76	+28	6
Spain	3	2	0	1	90	74	+16	4
Qatar	3	1	0	2	77	89	−12	2
Morocco	3	0	0	3	62	94	−32	0

July 26; 13:30	Poland	35 – 21	Morocco	Sports Complex Hall II, Manama; Referees: Al-Watani, Qamber (BHR)
July 26; 13:30	Kopyciński 8	(17–11)	Bourgibe, Rougchi 6	Sports Complex Hall II, Manama; Referees: Al-Watani, Qamber (BHR)
July 26; 13:30	2× (yellow card) 6× (suspension) 1× (red card)	Report	3× (yellow card) 3× (suspension)	Sports Complex Hall II, Manama; Referees: Al-Watani, Qamber (BHR)

July 26; 15:30	Qatar	23 – 30	Spain	Sports Complex Hall II, Manama; Referees: Hizaki, Ikebuchi (JPN)
July 26; 15:30	Madadi 7	(10–13)	Félez 6	Sports Complex Hall II, Manama; Referees: Hizaki, Ikebuchi (JPN)
July 26; 15:30	3× (yellow card) 7× (suspension)	Report	3× (yellow card) 3× (suspension)	Sports Complex Hall II, Manama; Referees: Hizaki, Ikebuchi (JPN)

July 27; 14:00	Morocco	19 – 26	Qatar	Sports Complex Hall II, Manama; Referees: Paz, Souza (BRA)
July 27; 14:00	Bourgibe 5	(11–11)	Al-Hajri 7	Sports Complex Hall II, Manama; Referees: Paz, Souza (BRA)
July 27; 14:00	3× (yellow card) 6× (suspension) 1× (red card)	Report	2× (yellow card) 8× (suspension) 1× (red card)	Sports Complex Hall II, Manama; Referees: Paz, Souza (BRA)

July 27; 16:00	Spain	27 – 29	Poland	Sports Complex Hall II, Manama; Referees: Anderson, Sødal (NOR)
July 27; 16:00	Mindegia 8	(10–14)	Chrapkowski 10	Sports Complex Hall II, Manama; Referees: Anderson, Sødal (NOR)
July 27; 16:00	2× (yellow card) 2× (suspension)	Report	3× (yellow card) 6× (suspension)	Sports Complex Hall II, Manama; Referees: Anderson, Sødal (NOR)

July 28; 14:00	Morocco	22 – 33	Spain	Sports Complex Hall II, Manama; Referees: Liu, Liu (CHN)
July 28; 14:00	Nassir, Imouzaz 5	(9–18)	Maqueda, Moya 6	Sports Complex Hall II, Manama; Referees: Liu, Liu (CHN)
July 28; 14:00	2× (yellow card) 2× (suspension)	Report	2× (yellow card) 2× (suspension)	Sports Complex Hall II, Manama; Referees: Liu, Liu (CHN)

July 28; 16:00	Poland	40 – 28	Qatar	Sports Complex Hall II, Manama; Referees: Al-Maamly, Shaban (EGY)
July 28; 16:00	Orzechowski 8	(18–10)	Al-Ali 8	Sports Complex Hall II, Manama; Referees: Al-Maamly, Shaban (EGY)
July 28; 16:00	3× (yellow card) 8× (suspension) 1× (red card)	Report	3× (yellow card) 5× (suspension)	Sports Complex Hall II, Manama; Referees: Al-Maamly, Shaban (EGY)

=== Group B ===
Team	Pld	W	D	L	GF	GA	GD	Pts
Croatia	3	2	1	0	104	68	+36	5 (Note: Tiebreaker: 1 PT / 0 GD)
Argentina	3	2	1	0	88	78	+10	5
Iran	3	1	0	2	79	90	−11	2
Algeria	3	0	0	3	74	109	−35	0

Notes:

July 26; 18:30	Croatia	45 – 19	Algeria	Sports Complex Hall II, Manama; Referees: Paz, Souza (BRA)
July 26; 18:30	Štrlek 8	(18–12)	Berkous 6	Sports Complex Hall II, Manama; Referees: Paz, Souza (BRA)
July 26; 18:30	3× (yellow card) 1× (suspension)	Report	3× (yellow card) 7× (suspension)	Sports Complex Hall II, Manama; Referees: Paz, Souza (BRA)

July 26; 20:30	Iran	25 – 29	Argentina	Sports Complex Hall II, Manama; Referees: Válek, Opava (CZE)
July 26; 20:30	A. Esteki 6	(19–15)	Vázquez 8	Sports Complex Hall II, Manama; Referees: Válek, Opava (CZE)
July 26; 20:30	3× (yellow card) 9× (suspension)	Report	3× (yellow card) 5× (suspension)	Sports Complex Hall II, Manama; Referees: Válek, Opava (CZE)

July 27; 18:00	Argentina	26 – 26	Croatia	Sports Complex Hall II, Manama; Referees: Al-Maamly, Shaban (EGY)
July 27; 18:00	F. Fernández 7	(12–14)	Štrlek 6	Sports Complex Hall II, Manama; Referees: Al-Maamly, Shaban (EGY)
July 27; 18:00	4× (yellow card) 4× (suspension)	Report	3× (yellow card) 4× (suspension)	Sports Complex Hall II, Manama; Referees: Al-Maamly, Shaban (EGY)

July 27; 20:00	Algeria	28 – 31	Iran	Sports Complex Hall II, Manama; Referees: Al-Watani, Qamber (BHR)
July 27; 20:00	Berkous, Souici 6	(11–13)	S. Esteki 12	Sports Complex Hall II, Manama; Referees: Al-Watani, Qamber (BHR)
July 27; 20:00	4× (yellow card) 4× (suspension) 1× (red card)	Report	3× (yellow card) 6× (suspension)	Sports Complex Hall II, Manama; Referees: Al-Watani, Qamber (BHR)

July 28; 18:00	Algeria	27 – 33	Argentina	Sports Complex Hall II, Manama; Referees: Gatelis, Mazelka (LTU)
July 28; 18:00	Berriah 9	(13–17)	Vieyra 9	Sports Complex Hall II, Manama; Referees: Gatelis, Mazelka (LTU)
July 28; 18:00	3× (yellow card) 8× (suspension) 1× (red card)	Report	3× (yellow card) 4× (suspension)	Sports Complex Hall II, Manama; Referees: Gatelis, Mazelka (LTU)

July 28; 20:00	Croatia	33 – 23	Iran	Sports Complex Hall II, Manama; Referees: Achifon, Nyoth (CMR)
July 28; 20:00	Tojčić 10	(18–12)	Masaeli 6	Sports Complex Hall II, Manama; Referees: Achifon, Nyoth (CMR)
July 28; 20:00	3× (yellow card) 1× (suspension)	Report	3× (yellow card) 1× (suspension)	Sports Complex Hall II, Manama; Referees: Achifon, Nyoth (CMR)

=== Group C ===
Team	Pld	W	D	L	GF	GA	GD	Pts
Bahrain	3	3	0	0	89	80	+9	6
Denmark	3	2	0	1	82	63	+19	4
Brazil	3	1	0	2	72	75	−3	2
Tunisia	3	0	0	3	65	90	−25	0

July 26; 18:30	Bahrain	29 – 28	Brazil	Sports Complex Hall I, Manama; Referees: Gatelis, Mazelka (LTU)
July 26; 18:30	A. Ali 6	(12–18)	Da Silva 6	Sports Complex Hall I, Manama; Referees: Gatelis, Mazelka (LTU)
July 26; 18:30	2× (yellow card) 2× (suspension) 1× (red card)	Report	3× (yellow card) 6× (suspension)	Sports Complex Hall I, Manama; Referees: Gatelis, Mazelka (LTU)

July 26; 20:30	Denmark	35 – 14	Tunisia	Sports Complex Hall I, Manama; Referees: Marina, Minore (ARG)
July 26; 20:30	Rasmussen 8	(18–7)	Hidri 4	Sports Complex Hall I, Manama; Referees: Marina, Minore (ARG)
July 26; 20:30	3× (yellow card) 1× (suspension)	Report	4× (yellow card) 6× (suspension)	Sports Complex Hall I, Manama; Referees: Marina, Minore (ARG)

July 27; 18:00	Tunisia	30 – 33	Bahrain	Sports Complex Hall I, Manama; Referees: Ossipov, Porol (KAZ)
July 27; 18:00	Ghribi 8	(13–17)	Al-Sayyad, Husein 7	Sports Complex Hall I, Manama; Referees: Ossipov, Porol (KAZ)
July 27; 18:00	3× (yellow card) 3× (suspension)	Report	3× (yellow card) 6× (suspension)	Sports Complex Hall I, Manama; Referees: Ossipov, Porol (KAZ)

July 27; 20:00	Brazil	22 – 25	Denmark	Sports Complex Hall I, Manama; Referees: Hizaki, Ikebuchi (JPN)
July 27; 20:00	Selicani 6	(9–14)	Bisbo 6	Sports Complex Hall I, Manama; Referees: Hizaki, Ikebuchi (JPN)
July 27; 20:00	3× (yellow card) 3× (suspension)	Report	3× (yellow card) 3× (suspension)	Sports Complex Hall I, Manama; Referees: Hizaki, Ikebuchi (JPN)

July 28; 18:00	Denmark	22 – 27	Bahrain	Sports Complex Hall I, Manama; Referees: Caçador, Nicolau (POR)
July 28; 18:00	Mortensen 9	(12–7)	Al-Fardan 6	Sports Complex Hall I, Manama; Referees: Caçador, Nicolau (POR)
July 28; 18:00	3× (yellow card) 3× (suspension)	Report	3× (yellow card) 10× (suspension)	Sports Complex Hall I, Manama; Referees: Caçador, Nicolau (POR)

July 28; 20:00	Tunisia	21 – 22	Brazil	Sports Complex Hall I, Manama; Referees: Anderson, Sødal (NOR)
July 28; 20:00	Alouini 8	(13–9)	Rocha 5	Sports Complex Hall I, Manama; Referees: Anderson, Sødal (NOR)
July 28; 20:00	2× (yellow card) 8× (suspension)	Report	2× (yellow card) 5× (suspension)	Sports Complex Hall I, Manama; Referees: Anderson, Sødal (NOR)

=== Group D ===
Team	Pld	W	D	L	GF	GA	GD	Pts
Sweden	3	3	0	0	126	67	+59	6
Egypt	3	2	0	1	113	78	+35	4
South Korea	3	1	0	2	114	97	+17	2
Australia	3	0	0	3	62	173	−111	0

July 26; 18:30	South Korea	59 – 23	Australia	Sports Complex Hall I, Manama; Referees: Achifon, Nyoth (CMR)
July 26; 18:30	Kim T.J., Shin S.I., Kim D.S. 10	(26–7)	Ridley, Matić 4	Sports Complex Hall I, Manama; Referees: Achifon, Nyoth (CMR)
July 26; 18:30	3× (yellow card) 7× (suspension)	Report	2× (yellow card) 7× (suspension)	Sports Complex Hall I, Manama; Referees: Achifon, Nyoth (CMR)

July 26; 20:30	Sweden	29 – 22	Egypt	Sports Complex Hall I, Manama; Referees: Caçador, Nicolau (POR)
July 26; 20:30	Carlen 7	(15–12)	Shehata, Omar, Kamel, El-Wakil, Hashem 3	Sports Complex Hall I, Manama; Referees: Caçador, Nicolau (POR)
July 26; 20:30	3× (yellow card) 5× (suspension)	Report	1× (yellow card) 3× (suspension)	Sports Complex Hall I, Manama; Referees: Caçador, Nicolau (POR)

July 27; 18:00	Australia	19 – 56	Sweden	Sports Complex Hall I, Manama; Referees: Liu, Liu (CHN)
July 27; 18:00	Marinković 6	(8–29)	Ekberg 13	Sports Complex Hall I, Manama; Referees: Liu, Liu (CHN)
July 27; 18:00	2× (yellow card) 5× (suspension)	Report	3× (yellow card) 2× (suspension)	Sports Complex Hall I, Manama; Referees: Liu, Liu (CHN)

July 27; 20:00	Egypt	33 – 29	South Korea	Sports Complex Hall I, Manama; Referees: Válek, Opava (CZE)
July 27; 20:00	Mahmoud 11	(15–13)	Shin S.I. 10	Sports Complex Hall I, Manama; Referees: Válek, Opava (CZE)
July 27; 20:00	2× (yellow card) 11× (suspension) 1× (red card)	Report	3× (yellow card) 5× (suspension)	Sports Complex Hall I, Manama; Referees: Válek, Opava (CZE)

July 28; 18:00	Egypt	58 – 20	Australia	Sports Complex Hall I, Manama; Referees: Al-Watani, Qamber (BHR)
July 28; 18:00	El-Wakil 12	(26–6)	Marinković 9	Sports Complex Hall I, Manama; Referees: Al-Watani, Qamber (BHR)
July 28; 18:00	3× (yellow card) 4× (suspension)	Report	3× (yellow card) 6× (suspension)	Sports Complex Hall I, Manama; Referees: Al-Watani, Qamber (BHR)

July 28; 20:00	Sweden	41 – 26	South Korea	Sports Complex Hall I, Manama; Referees: Marina, Minore (ARG)
July 28; 20:00	Ekdahl 7	(18–7)	Kim D.C. 10	Sports Complex Hall I, Manama; Referees: Marina, Minore (ARG)
July 28; 20:00	3× (yellow card) 7× (suspension) 1× (red card)	Report	3× (yellow card) 7× (suspension) 2× (red card)	Sports Complex Hall I, Manama; Referees: Marina, Minore (ARG)

== Placement round ==
=== Group P I ===
Team	Pld	W	D	L	GF	GA	GD	Pts
Qatar	3	2	0	1	83	74	+9	4 (Note: Tiebreaker: 2 PTS)
Iran	3	2	0	1	92	82	+10	4 (Note: Tiebreaker: 0 PTS)
Algeria	3	1	1	1	94	96	−2	3
Morocco	3	0	1	2	81	98	−17	1

Notes:

July 30; 20:00	Qatar	33 – 34	Algeria	Sports Complex Hall I, Manama; Referees: Shaban (EGY), Ossipov (KAZ)
July 30; 20:00	Madadi 12	(17–14)	Berkous 16	Sports Complex Hall I, Manama; Referees: Shaban (EGY), Ossipov (KAZ)
July 30; 20:00	3× (yellow card) 2× (suspension)	Report	3× (yellow card) 5× (suspension) 2× (red card)	Sports Complex Hall I, Manama; Referees: Shaban (EGY), Ossipov (KAZ)

July 30; 20:00	Iran	40 – 30	Morocco	Sports Complex Hall II, Manama; Referees: Al-Maamly (EGY), Achifon (CMR)
July 30; 20:00	Masaeli 11	(20–15)	Bajray 9	Sports Complex Hall II, Manama; Referees: Al-Maamly (EGY), Achifon (CMR)
July 30; 20:00	3× (yellow card) 10× (suspension) 2× (red card)	Report	3× (yellow card) 1× (suspension)	Sports Complex Hall II, Manama; Referees: Al-Maamly (EGY), Achifon (CMR)

July 31; 20:00	Morocco	32 – 32	Algeria	Sports Complex Hall II, Manama; Referees: Ossipov, Porol (KAZ)
July 31; 20:00	Nassir 7	(12–15)	Berkous 10	Sports Complex Hall II, Manama; Referees: Ossipov, Porol (KAZ)
July 31; 20:00	3× (yellow card) 6× (suspension) 1× (red card)	Report	3× (yellow card) 6× (suspension) 1× (red card)	Sports Complex Hall II, Manama; Referees: Ossipov, Porol (KAZ)

July 31; 20:00	Qatar	24 – 21	Iran	Sports Complex Hall I, Manama; Referees: Caçador (POR), Souza (BRA)
July 31; 20:00	Al-Hajri 10	(11–10)	Kiani 5	Sports Complex Hall I, Manama; Referees: Caçador (POR), Souza (BRA)
July 31; 20:00	3× (yellow card) 6× (suspension)	Report	3× (yellow card) 1× (suspension)	Sports Complex Hall I, Manama; Referees: Caçador (POR), Souza (BRA)

=== Group P II ===
Team	Pld	W	D	L	GF	GA	GD	Pts
Brazil	3	3	0	0	110	68	+42	6
South Korea	3	2	0	1	132	88	+44	4
Tunisia	3	1	0	2	102	76	+26	2
Australia	3	0	0	3	51	163	−112	0

July 30; 14:00	Brazil	51 – 13	Australia	Sports Complex Hall II, Manama; Referees: Liu, Liu (CHN)
July 30; 14:00	Maboni 8	(29–5)	Marinković, Edmonds, Abiera 3	Sports Complex Hall II, Manama; Referees: Liu, Liu (CHN)
July 30; 14:00	3× (yellow card) 1× (suspension)	Report	2× (yellow card) 7× (suspension) 1× (red card)	Sports Complex Hall II, Manama; Referees: Liu, Liu (CHN)

July 30; 14:00	South Korea	39 – 28	Tunisia	Sports Complex Hall I, Manama; Referees: Minore (ARG), Porol (KAZ)
July 30; 14:00	Shin S.I. 14	(16–12)	Hidri 7	Sports Complex Hall I, Manama; Referees: Minore (ARG), Porol (KAZ)
July 30; 14:00	3× (yellow card) 3× (suspension)	Report	3× (yellow card) 3× (suspension)	Sports Complex Hall I, Manama; Referees: Minore (ARG), Porol (KAZ)

July 31; 14:00	Tunisia	53 – 15	Australia	Sports Complex Hall I, Manama; Referees: Nicolau (POR), Qamber (BHR)
July 31; 14:00	Bhar 7	(25–4)	Karagiozis 6	Sports Complex Hall I, Manama; Referees: Nicolau (POR), Qamber (BHR)
July 31; 14:00	3× (yellow card)	Report	3× (yellow card) 6× (suspension)	Sports Complex Hall I, Manama; Referees: Nicolau (POR), Qamber (BHR)

July 31; 14:00	Brazil	37 – 34	South Korea	Sports Complex Hall II, Manama; Referees: Nyoth (CMR), Al-Watani (BHR)
July 31; 14:00	Selicani 8	(17–16)	Shin S.I. 9	Sports Complex Hall II, Manama; Referees: Nyoth (CMR), Al-Watani (BHR)
July 31; 14:00	3× (yellow card) 5× (suspension)	Report	2× (yellow card) 2× (suspension)	Sports Complex Hall II, Manama; Referees: Nyoth (CMR), Al-Watani (BHR)

== Main round ==
=== Group M I ===
Team	Pld	W	D	L	GF	GA	GD	Pts
Croatia	3	2	1	0	80	77	+3	5
Argentina	3	1	2	0	87	82	+5	4
Poland	3	1	1	1	83	83	0	3
Spain	3	0	0	3	80	88	−8	0

July 30; 16:00	Poland	29 – 29	Argentina	Sports Complex Hall II, Manama; Referees: Gatelis, Mazelka (LTU)
July 30; 16:00	Orzechowski 7	(12–17)	Mingorance 7	Sports Complex Hall II, Manama; Referees: Gatelis, Mazelka (LTU)
July 30; 16:00	2× (yellow card) 3× (suspension)	Report	2× (yellow card) 3× (suspension)	Sports Complex Hall II, Manama; Referees: Gatelis, Mazelka (LTU)

July 30; 16:00	Croatia	27 – 26	Spain	Sports Complex Hall I, Manama; Referees: Válek (CZE), Paz (BRA)
July 30; 16:00	Štrlek 7	(12–11)	Maqueda 11	Sports Complex Hall I, Manama; Referees: Válek (CZE), Paz (BRA)
July 30; 16:00	4× (yellow card) 5× (suspension)	Report	2× (yellow card) 4× (suspension)	Sports Complex Hall I, Manama; Referees: Válek (CZE), Paz (BRA)

July 31; 16:00	Spain	27 – 32	Argentina	Sports Complex Hall I, Manama; Referees: Al-Maamly, Shaban (EGY)
July 31; 16:00	Mindegia 8	(15–14)	J. Fernández 7	Sports Complex Hall I, Manama; Referees: Al-Maamly, Shaban (EGY)
July 31; 16:00	3× (yellow card) 6× (suspension)	Report	3× (yellow card) 6× (suspension)	Sports Complex Hall I, Manama; Referees: Al-Maamly, Shaban (EGY)

July 31; 16:00	Poland	25 – 27	Croatia	Sports Complex Hall II, Manama; Referees: Anderson, Sødal (NOR)
July 31; 16:00	Adamczak 7	(10–13)	Tojčić 8	Sports Complex Hall II, Manama; Referees: Anderson, Sødal (NOR)
July 31; 16:00	2× (yellow card) 4× (suspension)	Report	2× (yellow card) 2× (suspension)	Sports Complex Hall II, Manama; Referees: Anderson, Sødal (NOR)

=== Group M II ===
Team	Pld	W	D	L	GF	GA	GD	Pts
Denmark	3	2	0	1	81	80	+1	4 (Note: Tiebreaker: 2 PTS)
Sweden	3	2	0	1	88	69	+19	4 (Note: Tiebreaker: 0 PTS)
Egypt	3	1	0	2	88	90	−2	2
Bahrain	3	1	0	2	76	94	−18	2

Notes:

July 30; 18:00	Bahrain	28 – 35	Egypt	Sports Complex Hall I, Manama; Referees: Anderson, Sødal (NOR)
July 30; 18:00	Al-Maqabi 6	(9–11)	Abdel Aziz 8	Sports Complex Hall I, Manama; Referees: Anderson, Sødal (NOR)
July 30; 18:00	2× (yellow card) 7× (suspension)	Report	1× (yellow card) 9× (suspension)	Sports Complex Hall I, Manama; Referees: Anderson, Sødal (NOR)

July 30; 18:00	Sweden	22 – 26	Denmark	Sports Complex Hall II, Manama; Referees: Caçador, Nicolau (POR)
July 30; 18:00	Barud, Stenbäcken 4	(12–16)	Markussen 10	Sports Complex Hall II, Manama; Referees: Caçador, Nicolau (POR)
July 30; 18:00	3× (yellow card) 6× (suspension) 1× (red card)	Report	3× (yellow card) 6× (suspension)	Sports Complex Hall II, Manama; Referees: Caçador, Nicolau (POR)

July 31; 18:00	Denmark	33 – 31	Egypt	Sports Complex Hall II, Manama; Referees: Válek (CZE), Marina (ARG)
July 31; 18:00	Mortensen 8	(17–15)	Abdel Aziz 12	Sports Complex Hall II, Manama; Referees: Válek (CZE), Marina (ARG)
July 31; 18:00	2× (yellow card) 7× (suspension)	Report	2× (yellow card) 6× (suspension)	Sports Complex Hall II, Manama; Referees: Válek (CZE), Marina (ARG)

July 31; 18:00	Bahrain	21 – 37	Sweden	Sports Complex Hall I, Manama; Referees: Gatelis, Mazelka (LTU)
July 31; 18:00	Al-Salatna, A. Ali, Al-Maqabi, Husein 3	(12–16)	Carlen 8	Sports Complex Hall I, Manama; Referees: Gatelis, Mazelka (LTU)
July 31; 18:00	3× (yellow card) 5× (suspension)	Report	3× (yellow card) 7× (suspension)	Sports Complex Hall I, Manama; Referees: Gatelis, Mazelka (LTU)

== Placement matches ==
=== 15th/16th ===
August 2; 11:00	Morocco	38 – 24	Australia	Sports Complex Hall II, Manama; Referees: Ossipov, Porol (KAZ)
August 2; 11:00	Rougchi 8	(18–10)	Marinković 7	Sports Complex Hall II, Manama; Referees: Ossipov, Porol (KAZ)
August 2; 11:00	3× (yellow card) 2× (suspension)	Report	3× (yellow card) 8× (suspension) 1× (red card)	Sports Complex Hall II, Manama; Referees: Ossipov, Porol (KAZ)

=== 13th/14th ===
August 2; 11:00	Algeria	26 – 42	Tunisia	Sports Complex Hall I, Manama; Referees: Hizaki, Ikebuchi (JPN)
August 2; 11:00	Berriah 9	(11–25)	Alouini 13	Sports Complex Hall I, Manama; Referees: Hizaki, Ikebuchi (JPN)
August 2; 11:00	2× (yellow card) 4× (suspension)	Report	3× (yellow card) 4× (suspension)	Sports Complex Hall I, Manama; Referees: Hizaki, Ikebuchi (JPN)

=== 11th/12th ===
August 2; 13:30	Iran	39 – 41	South Korea	Sports Complex Hall II, Manama; Referees: Al-Watani, Qamber (BHR)
August 2; 13:30	A. Esteki 13	(20–20)	Shin S.I. 11	Sports Complex Hall II, Manama; Referees: Al-Watani, Qamber (BHR)
August 2; 13:30	3× (yellow card) 5× (suspension)	Report	3× (yellow card) 4× (suspension)	Sports Complex Hall II, Manama; Referees: Al-Watani, Qamber (BHR)

=== 9th/10th ===
August 2; 13:30	Qatar	27 – 36	Brazil	Sports Complex Hall I, Manama; Referees: Liu, Liu (CHN)
August 2; 13:30	Al-Ali 7	(11–17)	Selicani 9	Sports Complex Hall I, Manama; Referees: Liu, Liu (CHN)
August 2; 13:30	2× (yellow card) 3× (suspension) 1× (red card)	Report	3× (yellow card) 2× (suspension) 1× (red card)	Sports Complex Hall I, Manama; Referees: Liu, Liu (CHN)

=== 7th/8th ===
August 2; 18:30	Spain	37 – 28	Bahrain	Sports Complex Hall I, Manama; Referees: Marina, Minore (ARG)
August 2; 18:30	Félez 9	(17–10)	Madan 9	Sports Complex Hall I, Manama; Referees: Marina, Minore (ARG)
August 2; 18:30	2× (yellow card) 1× (suspension)	Report	3× (yellow card) 5× (suspension)	Sports Complex Hall I, Manama; Referees: Marina, Minore (ARG)

=== 5th/6th ===
August 2; 18:30	Poland	32 – 34	Egypt	Sports Complex Hall II, Manama; Referees: Paz, Souza (BRA)
August 2; 18:30	Szyba, Orzechowski 5	(12–17)	Abdel Aziz 9	Sports Complex Hall II, Manama; Referees: Paz, Souza (BRA)
August 2; 18:30	3× (yellow card) 4× (suspension)	Report	3× (yellow card) 4× (suspension)	Sports Complex Hall II, Manama; Referees: Paz, Souza (BRA)

== Final round ==
Semifinal
August 2 – Manama
Croatia	31
Sweden	28
August 2 – Manama
Denmark	36
Argentina	21

Final
August 3 – Manama
Croatia	26
Denmark	27
Third place
August 3 – Manama
Sweden	34
Argentina	27

=== Semifinals ===
August 2; 16:00	Croatia	31 – 28	Sweden	Sports Complex Hall I, Manama; Referees: Al-Maamly, Shaban (EGY)
August 2; 16:00	Duvnjak 10	(18–12)	Stenbäcken 8	Sports Complex Hall I, Manama; Referees: Al-Maamly, Shaban (EGY)
August 2; 16:00	2× (yellow card) 8× (suspension) 1× (red card)	Report	3× (yellow card) 4× (suspension)	Sports Complex Hall I, Manama; Referees: Al-Maamly, Shaban (EGY)

August 2; 16:00	Denmark	36 – 21	Argentina	Sports Complex Hall II, Manama; Referees: Caçador, Nicolau (POR)
August 2; 16:00	Jepsen, Mortensen 6	(19–11)	Simonet, Vázquez, J. Fernández 4	Sports Complex Hall II, Manama; Referees: Caçador, Nicolau (POR)
August 2; 16:00	3× (yellow card) 3× (suspension)	Report	3× (yellow card) 5× (suspension)	Sports Complex Hall II, Manama; Referees: Caçador, Nicolau (POR)

=== Bronze medal match ===
August 3; 16:00	Sweden	34 – 27	Argentina	Sports Complex Hall I, Manama; Referees: Anderson, Sødal (NOR)
August 3; 16:00	Carlen 12	(15–11)	Vieyra 6	Sports Complex Hall I, Manama; Referees: Anderson, Sødal (NOR)
August 3; 16:00	3× (yellow card) 6× (suspension)	Report	3× (yellow card) 3× (suspension) 1× (red card)	Sports Complex Hall I, Manama; Referees: Anderson, Sødal (NOR)

=== Gold medal match ===
August 3; 18:30	Croatia	26 – 27	Denmark	Sports Complex Hall I, Manama; Referees: Gatelis, Mazelka (LTU)
August 3; 18:30	Štrlek, Tojčić 7	(13–13)	Mortensen 9	Sports Complex Hall I, Manama; Referees: Gatelis, Mazelka (LTU)
August 3; 18:30	2× (yellow card) 4× (suspension)	Report	3× (yellow card)	Sports Complex Hall I, Manama; Referees: Gatelis, Mazelka (LTU)

== Final standings ==
Rank	Team
Gold medal	Denmark
Silver medal	Croatia
Bronze medal	Sweden
4	Argentina
5	Egypt
6	Poland
7	Spain
8	Bahrain
9	Brazil
10	Qatar
11	South Korea
12	Iran
13	Tunisia
14	Algeria
15	Morocco
16	Australia

== All-star team ==
- Niklas Landin Jacobsen (DEN)
- Manuel Štrlek (CRO)
- Rasmus Jensen (DEN)
- Ahmed Zeidan (EGY)
- Shin Seung-Il (KOR)
- Domagoj Duvnjak (CRO)
- Federico Vieyra (ARG)

== Medallists ==
Gold	Silver	Bronze
Denmark	Croatia	Sweden
Niklas Landin Jacobsen; Rasmus Søgaard Porup; Lars Gildbjerg; Matias Helt Jepsen; Kenneth Dahl Jørgensen; Nicolaj Andersson; Søren Bisbo; Nikolaj Markussen; Casper Ulrich Mortensen; Jannick Green; Rene Rasmussen; Mikkel Dons Schriver; Rasmus Jensen; Brian Sørensen; Morten Thrane; Jeppe Johann Jonasson; Coach: ?	Ivan Pešić; Stipe Borovac; Domagoj Duvnjak; Manuel Štrlek; Marko Tarabochia; Igor Karačić; Marko Matić; Ivan Sever; Josip Crnić; Mario Gagulić; Goran Bogunović; Ante Granić; Hrvoje Tojčić; Jopsip Ilić; Dinko Vuleta; Luka Raković; Coach: Slavko Goluža	Linus Persson; Niclas Barud; Joakim Bååk; Anton Månson; Johan Fagerlund; Oscar Carlén; Sebastian Lindell; Robin Andersson; Nacor Medina; Kim Ekdal du Rietz; Tobias Albrechtsson; Erik Hörberg; Henrik Ahnbrink; Fredrik Salmin du Guet; Jonathan Stenbäcken; Niclas Ekberg; Coach: ?
