= Jocelyn Ahouéya =

Beninese footballer (born 1985)

Personal information
- Date of birth: 19 December 1985 (age 40)
- Place of birth: Abomey, Benin
- Height: 1.75 m (5 ft 9 in)
- Position: Defensive midfielder

Senior career*
Years	Team	Apps	(Gls)
2002–2004	Mogas 90 FC		
2004–2009	FC Sion	100	(2)
2009–2010	FC Sion B	7	(0)
2010–2011	Strasbourg	24	(1)
2011–2012	AS Beauvais	9	(0)
2012–2013	SC Schiltigheim	7	(0)

International career
2003–2013	Benin	55	(3)
- * Club domestic league appearances and goals

Jocelyn Ahouéya (born 19 December 1985) is a Beninese former professional footballer who played as a defensive midfielder.

== Club career ==
Ahouéya began his career in the youth side for Mogas 90 FC and signed in summer 2004 for FC Sion.

== International career ==
Ahouéya was part of the Benin national team at the 2004 African Nations Cup, which finished bottom of its group in the first round of competition, thus failing to secure qualification for the quarter-finals. He also played at the 2005 FIFA World Youth Championship in the Netherlands. He made 55 appearances scoring three goals.

== Career statistics ==
Scores and results list Benin's goal tally first, score column indicates score after each Ahouéya goal.

List of international goals scored by Jocelyn Ahouéya
No.	Date	Venue	Opponent	Score	Result	Competition
1	7 January 2004	Stade Taïeb Mhiri, Sfax, Tunisia	Tunisia	1–1	1–2	Friendly
2	4 July 2004	Stade de l'Amitié, Cotonou, Benin	Egypt	2–0	3–3	2006 FIFA World Cup qualification
3	22 July 2008	Stade de l'Amitié, Cotonou, Benin	Niger	1–0	2–0	2010 FIFA World Cup qualification

== Honours ==
Sion

- Swiss Cup: 2008–09
