= Dramane Coulibaly =

Malian footballer (born 1979)

Personal information
- Full name: Dramane Coulibaly
- Date of birth: 18 March 1979 (age 47)
- Place of birth: Bamako, Mali
- Height: 1.80 m (5 ft 11 in)
- Position: Striker

Youth career
- Centre Salif Keita
- Marseille

Senior career*
Years	Team	Apps	(Gls)
1999–2001	Marseille	5	(0)
2001–2004	Laval	81	(19)
2004–2005	Brussels	0	(0)
2005–2006	Nîmes	13	(5)
2005–2007	Gueugnon	33	(5)
2007–2009	Tours	13	(1)
2010–2011	Pelita Jaya	10	(1)

International career
1998–2006	Mali	21	(8)
- * Club domestic league appearances and goals

Dramane Coulibaly (born 18 March 1979) is a Malian retired professional footballer who played as a striker. He spent his entire professional career in France except for a stint in Indonesia. He holds Malian and French nationalities.

== International goals ==
Scores and results list Mali's goal tally first, score column indicates score after each Coulibaly goal.

List of international goals scored by Dramane Coulibaly
No.	Date	Venue	Opponent	Score	Result	Competition
1	3 February 2002	Stade Abdoulaye Nakoro Cissoko, Kayes, Mali	South Africa	2–0	2–0	2002 African Cup of Nations
2	13 October 2002	Stade 26 mars, Bamako, Mali	Seychelles	3–0	3–0	2004 African Cup of Nations qualifier
3	20 November 2002	Prince Moulay Abdellah Stadium, Rabat, Morocco	Morocco	2–1	3–1	Friendly
4	20 November 2002	Prince Moulay Abdellah Stadium, Rabat, Morocco	Morocco	3–1	3–1	Friendly
5	30 March 2003	Asmara National Stadium, Asmara, Eritrea	Eritrea	2–0	2–0	2004 African Cup of Nations qualifier
6	5 June 2005	Stade Amari Daou, Ségou, Mali	Liberia	1–0	4–1	2006 World Cup qualifier
7	5 June 2005	Stade Amari Daou, Ségou, Mali	Liberia	2–0	4–1	2006 World Cup qualifier
8	12 June 2005	Stade Fernand Fournier, Arles, France	Algeria	1–0	3–0	Friendly
