= Mbulelo Mabizela =

South African footballer (born 1980)

Personal information
- Full name: Mbulelo Oldjohn Mabizela
- Date of birth: 16 September 1980 (age 46)
- Place of birth: Pietermaritzburg, South Africa
- Height: 1.78 m (5 ft 10 in)
- Positions: Centre-back; right-back; defensive midfielder

Youth career
- Edendale All Stars
- Mamelodi Sundowns
- Ashdown Young Buccaneers

Senior career*
Years	Team	Apps	(Gls)
2000–2001	Maritzburg City	37	(6)
2001–2003	Orlando Pirates	51	(4)
2003–2005	Tottenham Hotspur	7	(1)
2005–2006	Vålerenga	6	(0)
2006–2008	Mamelodi Sundowns	16	(0)
2009–2011	Platinum Stars	34	(0)
2011–2012	Bidvest Wits	28	(2)
2013	Chippa United	10	(1)
2013–2014	Mpumalanga Black Aces	14	(1)
2015	AmaZulu	12	(4)
2015–2016	Royal Eagles		

International career
2001–2008	South Africa	45	(2)
- * Club domestic league appearances and goals

Mbulelo Oldjohn Mabizela (born 16 September 1980) is a South African former professional soccer player who played as a defender and sometimes as a midfielder.

== Club career ==
=== Early professional career ===
Mabizela was born in Pietermaritzburg, KwaZulu-Natal. He started his career using his mother's surname Oldjohn, but later preferred to be known as Mabizela, the surname of his father, Dumisani, who also played soccer for AmaZulu. As the youngest player to captain the South Africa national team, his surname Oldjohn was often referred as a nickname.

Mabizela began his senior club career with Maritzburg City in the National First Division, later joining Orlando Pirates.

=== Europe ===
In August 2003, Mabizela joined Tottenham Hotspur after inspiring Pirates to a 2–1 win over Tottenham when the London club made a short tour of South Africa before the start of the 2003–04 season. He scored his only goal for the club on his debut after coming on as a substitute in a league match against Leicester City in October 2003. In October 2004, he had his contract cancelled by Tottenham Hotspur and was released by mutual agreement following several disciplinary infractions, including missing training sessions. He made only nine appearances in total for the club, scoring one goal.

Mabizela was invited to train with London-based club Fulham after his release, but was rejected by the club supposedly after being considered overweight. He joined Norwegian club Vålerenga in March 2005, six months after being without club and spent a season at the Norwegian club where he played infrequently and won the national title.

=== Return to South Africa ===
In August 2006 Mabizela came back to South Africa and signed for Mamelodi Sundowns. On December, he received a six-month ban from the game for drug offences. Following a number of disciplinary problems including a car accident and arrest for drunken driving in late 2008, he was made available for transfer and found a new home in January 2009 when he signed a three-year contract with Platinum Stars. He was later acquitted of the drunk driving charges.

Mabizela had his contract terminated in July 2009 after failing to show up for training, but was given a second chance by the new coach Steve Komphela. He signed new deal in August and, during the process, he refused to play after disagreeing on a clause in his contract.

On 7 June 2010, Mabizela was voted the Platinum Stars man of the match in the Stars' 3–0 defeat to the England international team in their final warm-up game before the 2010 World Cup in South Africa. Before the match he gave an interview in which he said he was looking forward to meeting Ledley King and Jermain Defoe again, two England players he played alongside at Tottenham Hotspur. Also he talked about how he is steadily overcoming his personal problems, "I had a good start at Spurs but it was too short and that's something I'll always look back on with regret", said Mabizela. "I've made a lot of mistakes in my personal life, things I'd rather not elaborate upon, and that was the reason I had to leave Spurs". "When I came back to South Africa I went for help, I got help and I'm still being helped. I wouldn't say I'm okay but I feel I'm going forward now. Platinum Stars have really helped me and at the moment I feel that I've really moved on. I am ready to move on with my career, even possibly back to Europe and I'd like to play for the Bafana Bafana international team again".

In May 2011 Platinum Stars announced a major clear-out of a number of players including Mabizela, who then became a free agent. On 11 August 2011, after being linked with a number of clubs including Orlando Pirates and Golden Arrows, Mabizela signed a two-year deal for Bidvest Wits on a free transfer and was given the squad number 3. In May 2012, Bidvest Wits held their end of season awards evening and Mabizela was named the club's Player of the Year at the function which was held at the Southern Sun in Monte Casino. It was reported that Mabizela had been an influential and outstanding figure at the club since joining at the beginning of that season.

During the 2012–13 season, Mabizela became very much unsettled at the Clever Boys during the first half of the season and requested to be released from his contract after the club made the following statement to the press in December 2012. "We have advised Mbulelo Mabizela and his agent that he is not part of our plans for the remaining duration of his contract with us and that we will consider offers from other clubs for his services during the forthcoming January transfer window period." On 20 January 2013, he joined Chippa United on an 18-month contract until June 2014 and was reported to say he hoped to help save the Cape Town teams young side from relegation by the end of the season. He was released at the end of the 2012–13 season after the team was relegated.

In October 2013 Mabizela began training with Mpumalanga Black Aces. Despite rumours linking him to former club Orlando Pirates, He signed a deal with Black Aces till the end of the 2013–14 season. In June 2014, the Black Aces spokesman Gordon Masondo confirmed that Mabizela's contract had been renewed until 30 June 2016. However, he was frozen out of the squad in October after falling out with manager Clive Barker, including a bust-up with a veteran coach and was released in December based on the recommendations of a disciplinary enquiry following his misbehavior.

On 26 January 2015, Mabizela signed for AmaZulu, which was at the bottom of the table, on a short-term contract. The player claimed that "the relegation challenge appealed to him", but failed to avoid relegation and was subsequently released.

=== National First Division (NFD) ===
Despite his negative experience with Clive Barker at Black Aces, Mabizela was requested to be signed by the former manager in October 2015, then at Maritzburg United. However, according to a former backroom employee at the club, the player would never sign for his hometown side after previous statements regarding the player, alcohol and banned substances. In the same month, he signed for NFD side Royal Eagles. In March 2016 he was dismissed for misconduct by the club.

== International career ==
Mabizela was first called to the South Africa national team by Carlos Queiroz in November 2001 after only 3 months of PSL experience as a late replacement to Nasief Morris for a friendly match against Egypt, against who he made his debut as a right-back. Despite having only one international cap, Mabizela was selected in South Africa's 22-man squad for the 2002 African Cup of Nations in Mali. He struggled in the right-back position during the tournament and came under criticism from the South African press for his unconvincing performances. South Africa were eliminated in the quarter-finals, and Mabizela was subsequently left out of Jomo Sono's squad for the 2002 FIFA World Cup.

After South Africa's World Cup campaign, Mabizela was recalled by new coach Ephraim Mashaba and moved into his preferred position at centre-back. The positional change proved significant, as he became a more consistent and effective performer for South Africa. Usually partnering Aaron Mokoena in central defence, Mabizela established himself as an important member of the national team and was regarded as a potential future captain. He featured in 14 of South Africa's 18 matches during this period, including all four African Cup of Nations qualifying matches.

On 14 June 2003, Mabizela was appointed captain for the first time in a friendly against Trinidad and Tobago at Telkom Park in Port Elizabeth. At the age of 22, he became the youngest player to captain the South African senior national team at the time. South Africa won 2–1, with Mabizela producing an assured performance in his first match as captain. He retained the captaincy for South Africa's remaining 2004 African Cup of Nations qualifying matches and played in every fixture of the campaign. South Africa remained unbeaten and conceded only one goal, securing qualification for the finals in Tunisia. Mabizela was subsequently confirmed as captain ahead of the tournament.

Aged 23, Mabizela became the youngest player to captain South Africa at the Africa Cup of Nations and started all three group-stage matches. South Africa finished third in their group and were eliminated at that stage for the first time in their history. Despite the early elimination, Mabizela was one of the few South African players to receive positive assessments for his performances.

The tournament was followed by controversy over a dispute concerning player payments. Mabizela and Mokoena were criticised in a SAFA report for their involvement in the dispute, but veteran goalkeeper Andre Arendse defended them, stating that the entire squad had supported their position during the negotiations. Several months later, Mabizela was stripped of the captaincy after reporting late for training, with Mokoena subsequently taking over the armband after previously serving as vice-captain.

Mabizela nevertheless remained a regular in the national team during the 2006 FIFA World Cup qualification campaign and scored his first two goals in a 2-1 win against Cape Verde. South Africa ultimately failed to qualify for the 2006 World Cup after finishing third in their qualifying group, although the result secured a place at the 2006 Africa Cup of Nations.

At the 2006 Africa Cup of Nations in Egypt, Mabizela started all three of South Africa's group-stage matches. He captained the team in their final group match against Zambia on 30 January 2006, which South Africa lost 1–0. South Africa were eliminated in the group stage after losing all three matches without scoring a goal.

Following the tournament, Mabizela was absent from the national team for more than two years amid poor club performances and personal problems. He was recalled in September 2008 and returned to international action in a qualifying match against Nigeria for the 2010 Africa Cup of Nations. This proved to be his only appearance after his recall and his final international match. He was dropped from the national squad after going AWOL from the national squad in October 2008 before a match against Malawi.

Mabizela went back to the headlines in January 2010 after claiming to be "better" than other defender that were in the national side, a view that was shared by commentators and fans. However, manager Carlos Alberto Parreira was unmoved by the comments and stressed that the behaviour of the players was part of the decision of the selection. He later wrote a letter of apology requesting to be given another chance but was never called to the national side again.

== Coaching career ==
In 2018 Mabizela obtained his Safa coaching D-licence qualification and was coaching at the Local Football Association in KwaZulu-Natal.

== Career statistics ==
Scores and results list South Africa's goal tally first, score column indicates score after each Mabizela goal.

List of international goals scored by Mbulelo Mabizela
No.	Date	Venue	Opponent	Score	Result	Competition
1	2004-06-05	Bloemfontein, South Africa	Cape Verde	1–0	2–1	2006 FIFA World Cup qualification
2	2004-06-05	Bloemfontein, South Africa	Cape Verde	2–0	2–1	2006 FIFA World Cup qualification

== Honours ==
Orlando Pirates

- South African Premier Division: 2002–03

== See also ==
- List of sportspeople sanctioned for doping offences
