= Shingayi Kaondera =

Zimbabwean footballer (born 1979)

Personal information
- Full name: Shingayi Kaondera
- Date of birth: 31 July 1979 (age 47)
- Place of birth: Seke, Zimbabwe
- Height: 1.74 m (5 ft 8 1/2 in)
- Position: Midfielder

Youth career
- Darryn T

Senior career*
Years	Team	Apps	(Gls)
1997	Darryn T		
1997–1998	Raków Częstochowa	0	(0)
1998–1999	Darryn T		
1999–2002	Górnik Zabrze	52	(4)
2002–2005	AEP Paphos	44	(6)
2005–2006	Gaziantepspor	6	(0)
2006–2007	SuperSport United	14	(3)
2007	AEK Larnaca	10	(1)
2007–2008	Nea Salamina	6	(0)
2009–2010	Digenis Morphou	21	(3)
2010–2011	Chalkanoras Idaliou	18	(4)
2011–2012	AEK Kouklia		

International career
2002–2007	Zimbabwe	22	(6)
- * Club domestic league appearances and goals

Shingayi Kaondera (born 31 July 1979 in Seke) is a Zimbabwean former professional footballer who played as a midfielder.

Kaondera started his career in native Darryn T in 1997. Between 1999 and 2002, he played for Polish Ekstraklasa club Górnik Zabrze before signing for Cypriot First Division outfit AEP Paphos in 2002. From 2005 to 2006 he played for Turkish club Gaziantepspor. For the next season, he moved back to Africa and joined South African Premier Division side SuperSport United. In July 2007, he signed a two-year contract with Cypriot club AEK Larnaca. Shortly after, in January 2008, Kaondera moved to Nea Salamina.

== Career statistics ==
=== International ===
Appearances and goals by national team and year
National team	Year	Apps	Goals
Zimbabwe	2002	2	1
Zimbabwe	2003	1	0
Zimbabwe	2004	3	1
Zimbabwe	2005	7	3
Zimbabwe	2006	6	0
Zimbabwe	2007	3	1
Total		22	6

Scores and results list Zimbabwe's goal tally first, score column indicates score after each Kaondera goal.

List of international goals scored by Shingayi Kaondera
No.	Date	Venue	Opponent	Score	Result	Competition
1	8 January 2002	Khalifa International Stadium, Doha, Qatar	Qatar	?–0	2–0	Friendly
2	5 June 2004	Stade Omar Bongo, Libreville, Gabon	Gabon	1–1	1–1	2006 FIFA World Cup qualification
3	27 March 2005	National Sports Stadium, Harare, Zimbabwe	Angola	1–0	2–0	2006 FIFA World Cup qualification
4	19 June 2005	Ahmed Zabana Stadium, Oran, Algeria	Algeria	1–1	2–2	2006 FIFA World Cup qualification
5	4 September 2005	National Sports Stadium, Harare, Zimbabwe	Rwanda	1–0	3–1	2006 FIFA World Cup qualification
6	29 May 2007	Rufaro Stadium, Harare, Zimbabwe	Burkina Faso	1–0	1–1	Friendly
