= Marei Al Ramly =

Libyan footballer (born 1977)

Personal information
- Full name: Marei Suliman Al Ramly
- Date of birth: December 4, 1977 (age 48)
- Place of birth: Libya
- Position: Midfielder

Team information
- Current team: Alakhdhar S.C.
- Number: 6

Senior career*
Years	Team	Apps	(Gls)
2004–06	Al-Ittihad	57	(12)
2006–present	Alakhdhar S.C.	35	(5)

International career
2001–2006	Libya	14	(2)
- * Club domestic league appearances and goals as of February 1, 2007

Marei Al Ramly (born December 4, 1977, in Libya) is a Libyan football midfielder. He currently plays for Al-Nasr, and is a member of the Libya national football team.
