= Juan Manuel Vázquez (handballer) =

Argentine handball player

Personal information
- Nationality: Argentine
- Born: 23 March 1988 (age 38) Buenos Aires

Sport
- Sport: Handball

Senior clubs
- Years: Team
- 2009-2021: River Plate
National team
Years	Team	Apps	(Gls)
2010-2021	Argentina	34	(50)

Juan Manuel Vazquez (born 23 March 1988) is an Argentine handball player. He was born in Buenos Aires. He represented Argentina at the 2012 London Summer Olympics, where the team finished 10th.
