= Linos Chalwe =

Zambian football striker (born 1980)

Personal information
- Date of birth: 17 September 1980 (age 46)
- Height: 1.82 m (6 ft 0 in)
- Position: Forward

Senior career*
Years	Team	Apps	(Gls)
1999-2000	Lusaka Dynamos	17	(5)
2000-2001	Mochudi Centre Chiefs SC	26	(4)
2001	Nchanga Rangers	12	(2)
2002	Zamsure Lusaka	8	(1)
2002-2004	Green Buffaloes	26	(8)
2003	→ Perlis (loan)	7	(1)
2004-2005	Manning Rangers	22	(5)
2005-2006	Bush Bucks		
2006-2008	Étoile du Sahel		
2008-2009	Bay United	16	(1)
2010-2011	Al-Karamah		
2012	NAPSA Stars		
2013-2015	Green Buffaloes		

International career
2005-2006	Zambia MNT	5	(1)
- * Club domestic league appearances and goals

Linos Chalwe (born 17 September 1980) is a Zambian football (also called soccer) striker.

He was part of the Zambian 2006 African Nations Cup team, who finished third in group C in the first round of competition, thus failing to secure qualification for the quarter-finals.

== Clubs ==
- 1999-2000: (Zambia) Lusaka Dynamos
- 2000-2001: (Botswana) Mochudi Centre Chiefs SC
- 2001: (Zambia) Nchanga Rangers
- 2002: (Zambia) Zamsure Lusaka
- 2002–2004: (Zambia) Green Buffaloes
- 2003: (Malaysia) Perlis (loan)
- 2004–2005: (South Africa) Manning Rangers
- 2005–2006: (South Africa) Bush Bucks
- 2006–2008: (Tunisia) Etoile du Sahel
- 2008–2009: (South Africa) Bay United
- 2010-2011: (Syria) Al-Karamah
- 2012: (Zambia) NAPSA Stars
- 2013-2015: (Zambia) Green Buffaloes
