= Noel Mkandawire =

Malawian footballer

Noel Mkandawire (25 December 1978 - 2017) was a Malawian football player with Super ESCOM of the Malawi Premier Division.

== International career ==
He has also frequently been capped for the Malawi national football team.
