= Armel Disney =

Congolese footballer

Mamouna-Ossila
Personal information
- Full name: Gaston Armel "Disney" Mamouma-Ossila
- Date of birth: 7 January 1980 (age 46)
- Place of birth: Brazzaville, Congo
- Height: 1.76 m (5 ft 9 1/2 in)
- Position: Striker

Senior career*
Years	Team	Apps	(Gls)
1996–2001	Étoile du Congo		
2002–2005	Internațional Pitești	49	(17)
2005–2006	Pandurii Târgu Jiu	28	(5)
2006–2010	Farul Constanța	22	(3)
2007–2008	→ Internațional Curtea de Argeș (loan)		
2008–2009	→ CSM Râmnicu Vâlcea (loan)	7	(1)
2010–2011	Vendée Poiré sur Vie (Note: The statistics for the 2009–10 season are unavailable.)	3	(0)
2011–2013	La Châtaigneraie		
Total		109	(26)

International career
2001–2008	Congo	21	(4)
- * Club domestic league appearances and goals

Gaston Armel "Disney" Mamouma-Ossila (born 7 January 1980) is a retired Congolese football player. FIFA lists his name as Armel Mamouna-Ossila.

== Club career ==
=== Early career ===
Disney was born on 7 January 1980 in Brazzaville, Congo. He began playing football in 1996 at local club Étoile du Congo with whom he won two Congo Premier League titles and a Coupe du Congo.

In 2002, he joined Romanian second league side Internațional Pitești for three seasons, during which the highlight was scoring nine goals in the 2003–04 season.

=== Pandurii Târgu Jiu ===
In 2005, Disney was transferred to first league team Pandurii Târgu Jiu, where on 7 August he made his Divizia A debut under coach Emil Săndoi in a 2–1 home loss to Farul Constanța. He scored his first goal on 24 September in a 2–1 home victory against Gloria Bistrița, one week later scoring again in another 2–1 win over CFR Cluj. Until the end of the season, Disney scored three more goals: the sole goal in a 1–0 win over Argeș Pitești, one in a draw against Oțelul Galați, and his final goal of the season in a loss to Vaslui.

=== Farul Constanța ===
In 2006, Disney was transferred from Pandurii to Farul Constanța. There, he started to play in European competitions, making three appearances in the Intertoto Cup, as they eliminated Lokomotiv Plovdiv in the second round, being defeated in the third round by Auxerre. He made his Divizia A debut for his new club in the first round of the 2006–07 season, playing under coach Momčilo Vukotić in a 1–1 draw against UTA Arad. Disney scored his first goal in the following round, a 3–1 win over Oțelul Galați. Until the end of the season, he scored two more goals in a 1–1 draw against Național București and a 2–0 home victory over his former team, Pandurii. In his only two seasons in the Romanian top-division, Disney amassed 50 appearances and scored eight goals.

=== Late career ===
In 2007, Disney was loaned by Farul to Internațional Curtea de Argeș in the third league, helping the club earn promotion to the second league. In the following season, he was loaned again by Farul, this time to CSM Râmnicu Vâlcea in the second league.

Disney ended his career in 2013 after playing a few seasons in the French lower leagues for Vendée Poiré sur Vie and La Châtaigneraie.

== International career ==
Disney made his debut for Congo under coach Paul Ebondzibato on 28 April 2001 in 2–0 win over Madagascar in the 2002 World Cup qualifiers. His next appearance, also during the same qualifiers, was a 1–1 draw against DR Congo. Subsequently, he played only one game in the 2004 African Cup of Nations qualifiers. However, Disney was an important figure for the team's 2006 World Cup qualifiers campaign, appearing in nine games in which he scored four goals, of which two were in victories over Liberia and Mali, and two in losses to Zambia and Togo. In the following years, he played five games during the 2008 African Cup of Nations qualifiers and three in the 2010 World Cup qualifiers, having a total of 21 appearances with four goals scored for The Red Devils.

=== International goals ===
Scores and results list Congo's goal tally first, score column indicates score after each Armel Disney goal.

List of international goals scored by Armel Disney
No.	Date	Venue	Opponent	Score	Result	Competition
1	20 June 2004	Stade Alphonse Massemba-Débat, Brazzaville, Congo	Liberia	2–0	3–0	2006 World Cup qualifiers
2	4 July 2004	Stade Alphonse Massemba-Débat, Brazzaville, Congo	Mali	1–0	1–0	2006 World Cup qualifiers
3	10 October 2004	Stade Alphonse Massemba-Débat, Brazzaville, Congo	Zambia	2–3	2–3	2006 World Cup qualifiers
4	8 October 2005	Stade Alphonse Massemba-Débat, Brazzaville, Congo	Togo	2–1	2–3	2006 World Cup qualifiers

== Honours ==
Étoile du Congo

- Congo Premier League: 2000, 2001
- Coupe du Congo: 2000

Internațional Curtea de Argeș

- Liga III: 2007–08
