= Arcadia Martin Wesay Toe =

Liberian footballer

Arcadia Toe
Personal information
- Full name: Arcadia Martin Wesay Toe
- Date of birth: August 20, 1982 (age 44)
- Place of birth: Yekepa, Liberia
- Position: Striker

Team information
- Current team: LISCR FC
- Number: 9

Senior career*
Years	Team	Apps	(Gls)
1994–1996	Tabou FC		
1997	Antapa United		
1997	Samatex FC		
1998	Urana FC d'Arlit		
1998–1999	Al-Wahda		
1999–2000	Al-Ittihad		
2000	Guangzhou Songri		
2000	Ton HS Can Tho		
2001–2002	Si Saket Steel Rock		
2002–2003	Abahani Limited Dhaka		
2004	Muktijoddha SKC Dhaka		
2004	Kelantan JPS		
2004–2006	Al-Shabab		
2007–2010	Dubai Club		
2010–	LISCR FC		

International career
2005–2008	Liberia	2	(1)
- * Club domestic league appearances and goals

Arcadia Martin Wesay Toe (born August 20, 1982) is a Liberian footballer who currently plays for LISCR FC.

== International career ==
The striker was also a member of the Liberia national football team.
