= Gervais Batota =

French-Congolese footballer

Personal information
- Date of birth: 10 March 1982 (age 44)
- Place of birth: Brazzaville, Republic of the Congo
- Height: 1.75 m (5 ft 9 in)
- Positions: Striker; midfielder

Team information
- Current team: FUS de Rabat

Senior career*
Years	Team	Apps	(Gls)
1998	Diables Noirs		
1999–2005	AS Mangasport		
2005–2007	AS Lyon-Duchere	27	(3)
2007–2009	FCM Târgoviște		
2009–2010	FC Gonfle Ville		
2010–2011	FUS de Rabat		

International career
2002–2009	Republic of the Congo	40	(15)
- * Club domestic league appearances and goals

Gervais Batota (born 10 March 1982 in Brazzaville) is a former French-Congolese footballer. He previously played for FUS de Rabat.
