= Ilongo Ngasanya =

Congolese footballer (born 1984)

Ilongo "Saddam" Ngasanya
Personal information
- Full name: Patrick Ilongo Ngasanya
- Date of birth: 8 August 1984 (age 42)
- Place of birth: Kinshasa, Zaire
- Height: 1.82 m (6 ft 0 in)
- Position: Forward

Youth career
- 2001: Les Stars Kinshasa

Senior career*
Years	Team	Apps	(Gls)
2003–2004	DC Motema Pembe		
2004–2005	Hapoel Tel Aviv	4	(0)
2005–2006	Wigan Athletic		
2005–2006	DC Motema Pembe		
2006	Spartak Nalchik	2	(1)
2006	Lokomotiv Moscow	0	(0)
2006–2008	FK Mladá Boleslav	2	(0)
2008–2010	Hatta Club		
2010–2011	DC Motema Pembe		
2011–2017	TP Mazembe		
2015–2016	→ Don Bosco		
2017–2020	Forest Rangers		
2020–2022	Power Dynamos		

International career
2004–2011	DR Congo	25	(2)
- * Club domestic league appearances and goals

Patrick Ilongo Ngasanya nicknamed Saddam (born 8 August 1984) is a Congolese former football midfielder, he previously played for Forest Rangers.

He was a member of the DR Congo national team at the 2006 African Nations Cup, which progressed to the quarter finals, where it were eliminated by Egypt, who eventually won the tournament.
