= Omar Ali Omar =

Emirati footballer (born 1981)

Personal information
- Full name: Omar Ali Omar Eisa
- Date of birth: 16 June 1981 (age 45)
- Place of birth: United Arab Emirates
- Height: 1.85 m (6 ft 1 in)
- Position: Defender

Senior career*
Years	Team	Apps	(Gls)
2001–2012	Al-Wahda		
2012–2014	Emirates Club		
2014–2016	Al Fujairah		
2016–2017	Al Dhafra		
2017–2018	Dibba Al Hisn		
- * Club domestic league appearances and goals

Omar Ali Omar (Arabic: عمر علي عمر) (born 16 June 1981) is an Emirati footballer who played as a defender.
