= Joseph Enakarhire =

Nigerian footballer (born 1982)

Personal information
- Date of birth: 6 November 1982 (age 44)
- Place of birth: Warri, Nigeria
- Height: 1.84 m (6 ft 0 in)
- Position: Defender

Youth career
- 1998–1999: Rangers International
- 1999–2001: Standard Liège

Senior career*
Years	Team	Apps	(Gls)
2001–2004	Standard Liège	75	(1)
2004–2005	Sporting CP	19	(0)
2005–2008	Dynamo Moscow	9	(1)
2006–2007	→ Bordeaux (loan)	16	(0)
2007–2008	→ Panathinaikos (loan)	2	(0)
2012	La Fiorita	0	(0)
2013	FC Daugava	2	(0)
Total		123	(1)

International career
2002–2006	Nigeria	22	(2)
- * Club domestic league appearances and goals

Joseph Enakarhire (born 6 November 1982) is a Nigerian former professional footballer. He could play as either a right-back or a central defender.

== Club career ==
Born in Warri, Enakarhire impressed at a young age at Standard Liège before moving to Sporting Clube de Portugal in 2004–05, signing a four-year contract and eventually becoming first-choice. However, after just one season, he was sold to Russia's big spenders Dynamo Moscow.

Unsettled, Enakarhire was loaned, in August 2006, to Ligue 1 side Bordeaux, as another former Sporting defender, Beto, left for Recreativo de Huelva also on loan. He was relatively used during the campaign and after the French decided against signing him permanently, he joined Greece's Panathinaikos on a season-long loan.

In July 2009, Enakarhire had an unsuccessful trial with Metz. In the following year, he met the same fate at Odense Boldklub and Energie Cottbus.

In late June 2012, after four years out of football, Enakarhire was signed by La Fiorita to boost the Sammarinese club's first campaign in the UEFA Europa League. In March of the following year he changed teams and countries again, joining Latvian Higher League champions FC Daugava but being released after only four months.

== International career ==
A Nigeria international since 2003, Enakarhire appeared with the Super Eagles at the 2004 and 2006 Africa Cup of Nations. He was an undisputed starter in the latter tournament as the country finished third, only conceding three goals.
