= Zvenyika Makonese =

Zimbabwean footballer (born 1977)

Personal information
- Full name: Zvenyika Makonese
- Date of birth: 7 July 1977 (age 49)
- Place of birth: Chiredzi, Rhodesia (now Zimbabwe)
- Height: 1.82 m (6 ft 0 in)
- Position: Central defender

Senior career*
Years	Team	Apps	(Gls)
2001–2004	Shabanie Mine	?	(?)
2004–2009	Engen Santos	97	(1)
2009–2011	Orlando Pirates	12	(0)
2011	Shabanie Mine		

International career^{‡}
2003–2010	Zimbabwe	30	(0)
- * Club domestic league appearances and goals as of 19 May 2009 ‡ National team caps and goals as of 19 May 2009

Zvenyika Makonese (born 7 July 1977 in Chiredzi) is a Zimbabwean footballer. He joined Cape Town-based Santos in 2004 from Zimbabwean club Shabanie Mine. He plays as a defender and was selected for the 2006 African Cup of Nations.

It was reported that he was set to join Stoke City at the end of the 2006–07 season after impressing in a trial at the club, despite interest from Wigan Athletic and several French clubs. However, no such move transpired. He also had an unsuccessful trial at Ligue 1 side Stade Rennes.

On 2 August 2011 Makonese marked his return to the domestic Premiership yesterday when he signed a deal to join Shabanie Mine. .

He was signed with Black-Leopards in Petersburg, but was unable to play in the PSL because of a lack of documents December 2011 to March 2012.
