= Ammar Abdel Aziz =

Sudanese footballer (born 1977)

Personal information
- Full name: Ammar Ramadan Abdel Aziz
- Date of birth: 4 September 1976 (age 50)
- Place of birth: Sudan
- Height: 1.83 m (6 ft 0 in)
- Position: Defender

Senior career*
Years	Team	Apps	(Gls)
1995–1998	Al-Mugren SC (Khartoum)		
1999–2002	Al Mirghani ESC		
2003–2009	Al-Hilal Club		
2009–2010	Muscat Club		
2010–2011	Alamal SC Atbara		
2012	Al-Shemali SC (Atbara)		

International career
2002–2008	Sudan	25	(1)
Medal record
Representing Sudan
CECAFA Cup
Third place	2004 Ethiopia
- * Club domestic league appearances and goals as of 1 June 2007

Ammar Ramadan Abdel Aziz Mereg (Arabic: عمار رمضان عبد العزيز مرق; born 5 February 1977) is a Sudanese former footballer who played as a defender. He formerly played for Al-Hilal.

Abdel Aziz was a member of the Sudan national football team. He scored his only international goal in a 1–1 away draw against Benin during the 2006 FIFA World Cup qualification.

== Honours ==
Sudan

- CECAFA Cup: 3rd place 2004
