= List of football clubs in Namibia =

The following is an incomplete list of association football clubs based in Namibia. For a complete list see Category:Football clubs in Namibia

== A ==
- Atlanta Bucks F.C. (Lüderitz)
- African Chiefs F.C. (Kalkfeld)
- African Motto FC (Oshakati)
- African Stars F.C. (Windhoek)

== B ==
- Bee Bob Brothers F.C. (Mariental)
- Benfica F.C. (Namibia) (Tsumeb)
- Black Africa S.C. (Windhoek)
- Black Hawk F.C. (Katima Mulilo)
- Black Morocco Chiefs (Mariental)
- Blue Birds F.C. (Walvis Bay)
- Blue Boys F.C. (Swakopmund)
- Blue Waters F.C. (Walvis Bay)

== C ==
- Celtic F.C. (Namibia) (Swakopmund)
- Chelsea F.C. (Namibia) (Grootfontein)
- Chief Santos (Tsumeb)
- Citizens F.C. (since 2023: "Davos F.C.") (Windhoek)
- Civics F.C. (since 2025: "Bucks Buccaneers F.C.") (Windhoek)
- Cuca Tops F.C. (Rundu)

== D ==
- Dates Eleven F.C. (Naute Dam)
- DTS Windhoek F.C. (Windhoek)

== E ==
- Eastern Chiefs (Bagani)
- Eastern Jumpers (Epukiro)
- Eeshoke Chula Chula FC (Helao Nafidi)
- Eleven Arrows F.C. (Walvis Bay)
- Eleven Warriors F.C. (Grootfontein)
- Epupa Eleven Stars F.C. (Ruacana)
- Epupa Zebra Stars F.C. (Opuwo)
- Etosha United F.C. (Kamanjab)

== F ==
- Fedics United F.C. (Keetmanshoop)
- Flying Eagles S.C. (Mariental)
- Fontein City F.C. (Omuthiya)
- Friends F.C. (Rehoboth)
- Further Fighters F.C. (Helao Nafidi)

== G ==
- Green Dangers F.C. (Kamanjab)
- Golden Bees F.C. (Outjo)
- Golden Bigs F.C. (Ondangwa)
- Ghetto Boyz F.C. (Kalkfeld)

== H ==
- Hotspurs F.C. (Namibia) (Windhoek)

== I ==
- Impala Chiefs F.C. (Windhoek)

== J ==
- Julinho Sporting F.C. (since 2024: "Julinho Athletic F.C.") (Rundu)

== K ==
- Kaltes Wasser Football Academy (Otavi)
- Kangweru Black Tops (Nyangana)
- Keetmanshoop United F.C. (Keetmanshoop)
- Khaibasen F.C. (Otjiwarongo)
- Khomas NAMPOL F.C. (Windhoek)
- Khuse Lions F.C. (Oshakati)
- KK Palace F.C. (Ondangwa)
- KK United F.C. (Nkurenkuru)
- Kalkfeld F.C. (Kalkfeld)

== L ==
- Latinos F.C. (Rehoboth)
- Life Fighters F.C. (Otjiwarongo)
- Liverpool F.C. (Namibia) (Okahandja)

== M ==
- Mariental Sport Club (Mariental)
- Mighty Gunners F.C. (Otjiwarongo)
- Mountain Rangers F.C. (Rosh Pinah)

== N ==
- Namibia Correctional Service F.C. (Mariental)
- Ntunguru F.C. (Shinyungwe)

== O ==
- Okahandja United F.C. (Okahandja)
- Okakarara Young Warriors F.C. (Okakarara)
- Okatana Franco United F.C. (Okatana)
- Omuthiya United F.C. (Omuthiya)
- Onambula United F.C. (Tsandi)
- Once Again F.C. (Sauyemwa, Rundu)
- Ongwediva City F.C. (Ongwediva)
- Oranjemund F.C. (Oranjemund)
- Orlando Pirates S.C. (Windhoek)
- Oshakati City F.C. (Oshakati)
- Oshikango Chiefs (Helao Nafidi)
- Oshikuku Young Stars F.C. (Oshikuku)
- Ondangwa City F.C (Ondangwa)

== P ==
- Pubs F.C. (Outjo)

== R ==
- Ramblers (Windhoek)
- Rebels F.C. (Windhoek)
- Robber Chanties F.C. (Khorixas)
- Rundu Chiefs (Rundu)

== S ==
- Satoka United (Kasote, Rundu)
- Sorento Bucs F.C. (Arandis)
- SK Windhoek (Windhoek)
- Supa Eleven F.C. (Mururani)
- Swakopmund F.C. (Swakopmund)
- Swallows F.C. (Namibia) (Windhoek)

== T ==
- Tigers S.C. (Windhoek)
- Touch and Go F.C. (Otavi)
- Tropical Heat F.C. (Grootfontein)
- Try Again F.C. (Keetmanshoop)
- Tura Magic F.C. (since 2023: "Ongos Sports Club") (Windhoek)

== U ==
- UNAM F.C. (Windhoek)
- UNAM Ogongo F.C. (Ogongo)
- United Stars F.C. (Rundu)

== W ==
- Winter Roses F.C. (Gobabis)

== Y ==
- Young African F.C. (Gobabis)
- Young Beauties F.C. (Keetmanshoop)
- Young Brazilians F.C. (Karasburg)
- Young Chiefs F.C. (Oshakati)
- Young Eagles F.C. (Okaukuejo)
- Young Ones F.C. (Windhoek)
- Young Rangers F.C. (Opuwo) (Opuwo)
- Young Rangers F.C. (Tsumeb) (Tsumeb)
