= 2024–25 Namibia Premiership =

Namibia Premiership
- Season: 2024–25
- Dates: November 2024 – June 2025
- Champions: African Stars

The 2024–25 Namibia Premiership was the third season of the Namibia Premiership, the top-tier football league in Namibia. African Stars were the reigning champions after winning the championship for the second consecutive season, and retained their title.

The new clubs promoted for the season were: KK Palace from the Northwest Division, Cuca Tops FC from the Northeast Division, and Namibia Correctional Service FC from the Southern Division. Cuca Tops FC returned to the nation's top flight for the first time in twenty-two years, last appearing in the Namibia Premier League in the 2002–03 season.

Orlando Pirates did not participate in the top-flight for the first time after being relegated the previous season. Life Fighters and Okakarara Young Warriors were also relegated.

== Club location ==
NPFL teams 2024/25

== League table ==
Pos	Team	Pld	W	D	L	GF	GA	GD	Pts	Qualification or relegation
1	African Stars (C, Q)	30	16	10	4	47	25	+22	58	Champions, Qualification to the 2025–26 CAF Champions League
2	Young African	30	13	15	2	34	19	+15	54	
3	Khomas NAMPOL	30	14	9	7	48	31	+17	51	
4	Ongos	30	13	11	6	36	22	+14	50	
5	Mighty Gunners	30	11	16	3	35	27	+8	49	
6	UNAM	30	11	12	7	32	23	+9	45	
7	Eeshoke Chula Chula	30	10	15	5	26	22	+4	45	
8	KK Palace	30	10	13	7	31	23	+8	43	
9	Blue Waters	30	10	13	7	30	24	+6	43	
10	Bucks Buccaneers	30	8	12	10	31	32	−1	36	
11	United Africa Tigers	30	8	10	12	33	37	−4	34	
12	Okahandja United	30	10	4	16	31	38	−7	34	
13	Julinho Sporting	30	6	14	10	27	31	−4	32	
14	Young Brazilians (R)	30	5	8	17	30	54	−24	23	Relegation to First Division
15	Blue Boys (R)	30	3	13	14	20	40	−20	22	Relegation to First Division
16	Cuca Tops (R)	30	1	7	22	12	55	−43	10	Relegation to First Division

(C) Champions; (Q) Qualified for the phase indicated; (R) Relegated
