= 2014–15 Namibia Premier League =

Namibia Premier League
- Season: 2014–15
- Champions: African Stars
- Relegated: Benfica; Rebels; Touch & Go
- 2016 CAF Champions League: African Stars
- 2016 CAF Confederation Cup: Tigers
- Matches: 240
- Goals: 604 (2.52 per match)
- Biggest home win: Tura Magic 7-0 Julinho Sporting (7 December 2014)
- Biggest away win: UNAM 0-6 Black Africa (10 May 2015)
- Highest scoring: 2 matches: Tura Magic 7-0 Julinho Sporting (7 December 2014); Rebels 3-4 Tura Magic (13 December 2014)
- Longest winning run: Black Africa (8)
- Longest unbeaten run: Black Africa (12)
- Longest winless run: Benfica (19)
- Longest losing run: Benfica (6)

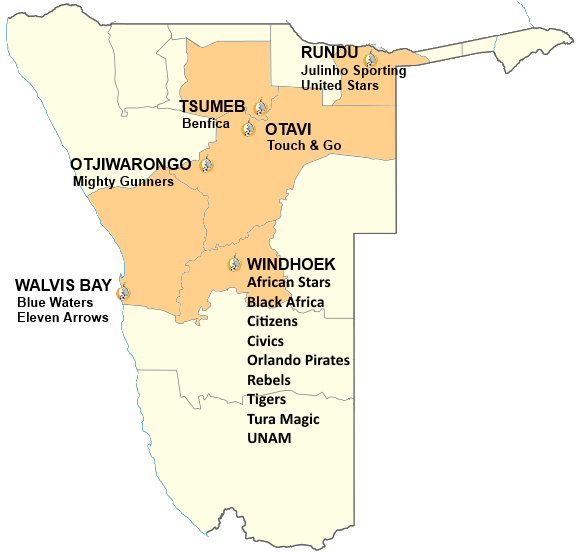
Map of the Namibia Premier League 2014/15 Season

The 2014–15 Namibia Premier League is the 26th season of top-tier football in Namibia. The season started on 11 October 2014. Black Africa S.C. are the defending champions, coming off their fourth consecutive title.

== Teams ==
A total of 16 teams will contest the league, which expanded from 12 clubs in the 2013-14 season. Rundu Chiefs and Blue Boys F.C. were both relegated to First Division after finishing 11th and 12th, respectively, the previous season while Ramblers F.C. also dropped out from the previous year's league. Benfica F.C., Citizens F.C., Julinho Sporting F.C., Mighty Gunners F.C., Rebels F.C., Touch & Go F.C. and University of Namibia are all new additions to the competition this year.

=== Stadiums and locations ===
Locations of the 2014-15 Namibia Premier League teams

Team	Home city	Stadium	Capacity
African Stars F.C.	Windhoek	Khomasdal Stadium	2,000
Benfica F.C.	Tsumeb	Oscar Norich Stadium	1,500
Black Africa S.C.	Windhoek	Sam Nujoma Stadium	12,300
Blue Waters F.C.	Walvis Bay	Narraville Stadium	1,500
Citizens F.C.	Windhoek	Sam Nujoma Stadium	12,300
F.C. Civics Windhoek	Windhoek	Sam Nujoma Stadium	12,300
Eleven Arrows F.C.	Walvis Bay	Narraville Stadium	1,500
Julinho Sporting F.C.	Rundu	Rundu Sports Stadium	500
Mighty Gunners F.C.	Otjiwarongo	Mokati Stadium	1,000
Orlando Pirates S.C.	Windhoek	Sam Nujoma Stadium	12,300
Rebels F.C.	Windhoek	Sam Nujoma Stadium	12,300
United Africa Tigers	Windhoek	Sam Nujoma Stadium	12,300
Touch & Go F.C.	Otavi		
Tura Magic F.C.	Windhoek	Sam Nujoma Stadium	12,300
University of Namibia	Windhoek		
United Stars F.C.	Rundu	Rundu Sports Stadium	500

== League table ==
Pos	Team	Pld	W	D	L	GF	GA	GD	Pts	Qualification or relegation
1	African Stars (C, Q)	30	21	5	4	52	15	+37	68	2016 CAF Champions League
2	Black Africa	30	17	10	3	51	21	+30	61	
3	Tura Magic	30	16	8	6	53	28	+25	56	
4	Tigers (Q)	30	16	7	7	45	24	+21	55	2016 CAF Confederation Cup
5	Blue Waters	30	14	10	6	45	32	+13	52	
6	Orlando Pirates	30	15	5	10	40	35	+5	50	
7	Civics	30	11	11	8	34	25	+9	44	
8	Mighty Gunners	30	11	6	13	40	42	−2	39	
9	Citizens	30	9	10	11	33	35	−2	37	
10	UNAM	30	9	10	11	35	44	−9	37	
11	United Stars	30	10	4	16	31	43	−12	34	
12	Eleven Arrows	30	8	9	13	39	45	−6	33	
13	Julinho Sporting	30	9	5	16	28	54	−26	32	
14	Touch & Go (R)	30	8	7	15	38	50	−12	31	Relegation to First Division
15	Rebels (R)	30	4	6	20	20	54	−34	18	Relegation to First Division
16	Benfica (R)	30	3	5	22	20	57	−37	14	Relegation to First Division

Updated to match(es) played on 10 May 2015. Source: FIFA.com
Rules for classification: 1) points; 2) goal difference; 3) number of goals scored.
(C) Champions; (Q) Qualified for the phase indicated; (R) Relegated
