= 2022–23 Namibia Premier Football League =

Namibia Premiership
- Season: 2022–23
- Dates: 6 November 2022 – 13 May 2023
- Champions: African Stars
- Relegated: Eleven Arrows, Citizens, Black Africa
- Champions League: African Stars
- Matches played: 240
- Goals scored: 608 (2.53 per match)
- Top goalscorer: (Namibia) Willy Stephanus (20 goals)

The 2022–23 Namibia Premier Football League was the first season of the Namibia Premiership, the top-tier football league in Namibia which replaced the Namibia Premier League, and the first full season of top-tier football in the country following the COVID-19 pandemic.

The Namibia Premier League was dissolved after the 2018/19 season and there was no top flight football in the country until Debmarine Namibia sponsored the league for N$13 million. The league started in November 2022 with African Stars playing Unam FC in the first match.

African Stars won the championship with several rounds still to play and qualified for the CAF Champions League.

NPFL teams 2022/23

== League table ==
Pos	Team	Pld	W	D	L	GF	GA	GD	Pts	Qualification or relegation
1	African Stars (C)	30	22	7	1	62	15	+47	73	Champions, Qualification to the 2023–24 CAF Champions League
2	Blue Waters	30	18	7	5	49	29	+20	61	
3	Life Fighters	30	15	6	9	52	37	+15	51	
4	Mighty Gunners	30	14	8	8	45	30	+15	50	
5	UNAM	30	13	8	9	28	24	+4	47	
6	Okahandja United	30	11	10	9	31	30	+1	43	
7	United Africa Tigers	30	10	12	8	40	33	+7	42	
8	Tura Magic	30	12	6	12	43	43	0	42	
9	Young African	30	10	10	10	27	27	0	40	
10	Civics	30	10	7	13	34	33	+1	37	
11	Orlando Pirates	30	10	6	14	40	47	−7	36	
12	Young Brazilians	30	9	7	14	36	58	−22	34	
13	Julinho Sporting	30	8	9	13	42	53	−11	33	
14	Black Africa (R)	30	7	9	14	29	40	−11	30	Relegation
15	Eleven Arrows (R)	30	5	11	14	32	44	−12	26	Relegation
16	Citizens (R)	30	2	5	23	18	65	−47	11	Relegation

Source: RSSSF
Rules for classification: 1) points; 2) goal difference; 3) number of goals scored.
(C) Champions; (R) Relegated

== Controversy ==
On 8th May 2023 Sylvester ‘Lolo’ Goraseb executive member of Black Africa replied to a Facebook post by the Thru Pass Football magazine that “there will be no promotion or relegation” while sitting 3rd from the bottom of the league.
