= 2021–22 Namibia Football Premier League =

1st season of the Namibia Football Premier League

Namibia Football Premier League
- Dates: September 2021 – June 2022

The 2021–22 Namibia Football Premier League will be the inaugural full season of the Namibia Football Premier League which replaces the defunct Namibia Premier League as the sanctioned top-flight league in Namibia. The season will run from September 2021 to June 2022 in alignment with the FIFA calendar.

A transitional tournament was held from 17 April to 31 July 2021 as preparation for the first full season of the league. The twelve Premier League clubs were divided into two groups to begin the competition.

== Teams ==
Twelve clubs from the defunct Namibia Premier League are set to participate.

- Black Africa S.C.
- Blue Waters F.C.
- Citizens F.C.
- Civics F.C.
- Eleven Arrows F.C.
- Julinho Sporting F.C.
- Mighty Gunners F.C.
- Orlando Pirates S.C.
- Tigers F.C.
- Tura Magic F.C.
- Young Brazilians F.C.
- Young Africans S.C.
