= 2018–19 Namibia Premier League =

29th top-flight football season in Namibia

Namibia Premier League
- Season: 2018–19
- Champions: Black Africa

The 2018–19 Namibia Premier League was the 29th season of the Namibia Premier League, the former top-tier football league in Namibia that started on 9 November 2018.

== Standings ==
Pos	Team	Pld	W	D	L	GF	GA	GD	Pts	Promotion, qualification or relegation
1	Black Africa	28	19	7	2	66	22	+44	64	Champions
2	African Stars	28	16	6	6	40	23	+17	54	
3	Tura Magic	28	12	11	5	40	31	+9	47	
4	UNAM	28	11	9	8	42	30	+12	42	
5	Life Fighters	28	12	5	11	45	43	+2	41	
6	Mighty Gunners	28	11	7	10	34	31	+3	40	
7	Citizens	28	9	12	7	36	32	+4	39	
8	Eleven Arrows	28	9	9	10	33	33	0	36	
9	United Africa Tigers	28	9	8	11	37	29	+8	35	
10	Julinho Sporting	28	10	5	13	31	49	−18	35	
11	Blue Waters	28	8	6	14	26	41	−15	30	
12	Okahandja United	28	6	11	11	27	32	−5	29	
13	Young Brazilians	28	7	8	13	41	62	−21	29	
14	Civics	28	7	7	14	27	41	−14	28	Relegation to First Division
15	Orlando Pirates	28	6	5	17	22	48	−26	23	Relegation to First Division
16	Young Africans	0	0	0	0	0	0	0	0 (Note: Young Africans were expelled, with all their results annulled.)	Club expelled

Source: RSSSF
