= 2017–18 Namibia Premier League =

Namibia Premier League
- Season: 2017–18
- Champions: African Stars

The 2017–18 Namibia Premier League is the 28th season of top-tier football in Namibia. It returned after not being played in 2016–17. The season started on 20 October 2017 and finished on 6 May 2018.

== Standings ==
Final table.

Pos	Team	Pld	W	D	L	GF	GA	GD	Pts
1	African Stars (Q)	30	19	7	4	40	14	+26	64
2	Black Africa	30	15	10	5	52	29	+23	55
3	Mighty Gunners	30	17	3	10	48	36	+12	54
4	Unam FC	30	13	9	8	43	32	+11	48
5	Young African	30	12	11	7	35	25	+10	47
6	Tigers FC	30	14	4	12	42	33	+9	46
7	Tura Magic	30	12	7	11	41	36	+5	43
8	Orlando Pirates	30	10	9	11	39	39	0	39
9	Eleven Arrows	30	10	9	11	48	49	−1	39
10	Life Fighters	30	9	10	11	28	39	−11	37
11	Citizens FC	30	10	7	13	36	49	−13	37
12	Civics FC	30	7	14	9	33	27	+6	35
13	Blue Waters	30	8	8	14	33	43	−10	32
14	Young Chiefs FC (R)	30	6	13	11	29	36	−7	31
15	Rundu Chiefs FC (R)	30	6	9	15	34	55	−21	27
16	Chief Santos (R)	30	3	8	19	20	59	−39	17

Updated to match(es) played on unknown. Source:
(Q) Qualified for the phase indicated; (R) Relegated

== See also ==
- 2018 Namibia FA Cup
