= Tugela Tuyeni =

Namibian footballer

Personal information
- Full name: Tugela Tulongeni Tuyeni
- Date of birth: 2 May 1977
- Place of birth: Onekwaya, Namibia
- Date of death: 16 December 2016 (aged 39)
- Place of death: Tsumeb, Oshikoto Region
- Height: 1.85 m (6 ft 1 in)
- Position: Midfielder

Senior career*
Years	Team	Apps	(Gls)
1996–1999	Blue Boys		
1999–2004	Blue Waters		
2004-2011	Civics		
2012	United Africa Tigers		

International career
2008	Namibia	2	(1)
- * Club domestic league appearances and goals

Tugela Tuyeni (2 May 1977 – 16 December 2016) was a Namibian midfield footballer with Civics of the Namibia Premier League and the Namibia national football team.

== Club career ==
Tugela fled into exile for the liberation of Namibia as a little boy tailing his parents to various refugee camps in Angola and Zambia respectively during Namibia’s liberation war against the South African apartheid regime. He then became a resident of Swakopmund where he was placed in the care of his aunt to start his primary education until he completed his secondary education at Namibia’s most revered holiday resort. He then started playing football with local side Blue Boys.

He later won three league titles with Civics and two with Blue Waters. He retired in 2013.

== International career ==
Tuyeni played twice for the Namibia national football team, in March and May 2008. He scored on his debut against Malawi.

== Personal life ==
Tuyeni died in a car accident in December 2016. He was declared dead upon arrival at the Tsumeb State Hospital after the pick-up truck he was in veered of the road and crashed into a traffic sign between Tsumeb and Oshikoto.

== Honours ==
- Namibia Premier Football League: 5

2000, 2004, 2005, 2006, 2007

- NFA Cup: 1

2008
