= Pineas Jacob =

Namibian footballer (born 1985)

Personal information
- Date of birth: 29 October 1985 (age 40)
- Place of birth: Windhoek, South West Africa
- Height: 1.70 m (5 ft 7 in)
- Position: Forward

Team information
- Current team: Mighty Gunners

Senior career*
| Years | Team | Apps | (Gls) |
| 2007–2009 | Ramblers | | |
| 2009–2010 | Civics Windhoek | | |
| 2010–2013 | United Africa Tigers | | |
| 2013–2014 | AmaZulu | 3 | (0) |
| 2014–2015 | Black Africa SC | | |
| 2017– | Mighty Gunners | | |

International career^{‡}
| 2007–2014 | Namibia | 21 | (1) |
- * Club domestic league appearances and goals as of 31 October 2020 ‡ National team caps and goals as of 31 October 2020

Pineas Jacob (born 29 October 1985) is a Namibian footballer) who plays as a defender with Ramblers F.C. and the Namibia national football team.

== International career ==
He has 2 caps for Namibia and was on the squad which appeared at the 2008 Africa Cup of Nations, though he did not appear. He made his debut with Namibia in a friendly against Saudi Arabia.

== Honours ==
=== Individual ===
- Namibia Premier League top scorer: 2007–08
