= Woody Jacobs =

Namibian football manager

Personal information
- Full name: Nicolas Jacobs
- Place of birth: Namibia

Managerial career
- Years: Team
- 2013–2015: Stars
- 2015–2016: Black Africa
- 2016–2017: Pirates
- 2018–2019: Tigers
- 2023–2024: Matebele
- 2024–: TAFIC

Nicolas "Woody" Jacobs is a Namibian football manager who manages TAFIC.

== Life and career ==
Jacobs was born in Namibia. He has been nicknamed "Woody". He is the son of Namibian musician Skwana Louw. He studied education and sports management at Nelson Mandela University. He obtained the A License. He has been regarded as one of the Namibian league's most successful managers. He has been described as "widely rated as a great technician". In 2013, he was appointed manager of Namibian side Stars. He helped the club win the league. He helped them win the Namibia FA Cup.

In 2015, he was appointed manager of Namibian side Black Africa. In 2016, he was appointed manager of Namibian side Pirates. In 2018, he was appointed manager of Namibian side Tigers. In 2023, he was appointed manager of Botswana side Matebele. He became the first Namibian manager to manage a Botswana side. In 2024, he was appointed manager of Botswana side TAFIC.
