= Hartman Toromba =

Namibian footballer (born 1984)

Personal information
- Date of birth: 2 November 1984 (age 41)
- Place of birth: Windhoek, Namibia
- Height: 1.75 m (5 ft 9 in)
- Position: Full-back

Senior career*
| Years | Team | Apps | (Gls) |
| 2003–2006 | Black Africa | | |
| 2006–2008 | Black Leopards | 17 | (0) |
| 2008–2009 | Free State Stars | 3 | (0) |
| 2009–2010 | Vasco da Gama | | |
| 2010–2013 | Black Africa | | |
| 2013–2014 | African Stars | | |

International career
| 2003–2011 | Namibia | 35 | (0) |
- * Club domestic league appearances and goals

Hartman Toromba (born 2 November 1984 in Windhoek) is a Namibian football defender who last played for African Stars F.C. in the Namibia Premier League.

He moved to the South African club Free State Stars, having joined the team in 2008 from Black Leopards, who were relegated. Prior to moving to South Africa, he played for Black Africa.

He was a part of the Namibian squad at the 2008 African Cup of Nations.
