= Life Fighters F.C. =

Namibian football club

- Full name: Life Fighters Football Club
- Nickname: Kahirona
- Founded: 1964; 62 years ago
- Ground: Mokati Stadium, Otjiwarongo
- Capacity: 1,000
- Chairman: Moses Kangumba
- League: Namibia Premiership
- 2025–26: 15th (relegated)
Home colours	Away colours

Life Fighters F.C. is a Namibian professional football team based in Otjiwarongo. Nicknamed Okahirona, it competed in the Namibia Premiership until its relegation at the end of the 2025–26 season. It is one of the oldest teams in the country.

== History ==
The club was founded in 1964, the same year as Black Africa and Eleven Arrows, by a young group led by local grocery store owner Emil Kuhanga. It organized exhibitions in the absence of a league structure and hosted the Ovaherero knockout tournament for the Herero-speaking teams of the region, and developed a fierce rivalry with African Stars. It played its first season in the new Namibia Premier League in 1987 but were relegated after only a few seasons.

After returning to the top tier, the Life Fighters played in the finals of the Namibia FA Cup in 2000 and 2004, losing each time. Still, it was a great achievement for the team managed by former player Eliah Tjazerua. The 2004–05 Premier League season saw them finish 15th out of 16 teams. The league had earlier made the decision to award them a 0–2 loss in Round 20 against United Africa Tigers for a "lack of security personnel," and their appeal for arbitration was dismissed by the Namibia Football Association Appeals Committee. After months of deliberation the league announced that the 12th through 16th placed teams were to play in a qualifying playoff to determine who would play in the actual promotion/relegation playoff. Nevertheless, they refused to participate and were automatically relegated after the games were played without them.

The Life Fighters spent the following decade in the second and third tiers of the national league system, but diehard supporter Anton Kake took over as chairman and invested his own money to save his childhood club. Under his leadership they eventually secured promotion to the top tier at the end of the 2015–16 season with four matches left. There was no season held the next year, although they did play in the 2017 FA Cup. The team made its long-awaited return to the Premier League in 2017–18, finishing in tenth place. At the midway point the following season, they stood in third place with only three losses, and 21-year-old striker Isaskar Gurirab earned a call-up to the Namibia national team by manager Ricardo Mannetti.

=== Domestic history ===
Season	Div.	Pos.	Pl.	W	D	L	GS	GA	P	Domestic Cup
1987	1st									1/8 finals (Note: Mainstay Cup; Namibia FA Cup not played until 1990)
1988	1st	14	30	8	6	16	29	56	23 (Note: Also reported with 21 points; 15th place team Hungry Lions were awarded two 0-5 losses against them and finished with 21 points.)	1/16 finals (Note: Novel Ford Cup; Namibia FA Cup not played until 1990)
1989	1st	11								
1990	1st									1/16 finals
1991/92	?									
1993	2nd	8	18	6	2	10	33	37	14	
1994	2nd									1/16 finals
1995	1st									
1996	1st									
1997–98	1st	8	22	7	7	8	32	35	28	
2000	1st	10	26	10	4	12	40	43	34	Runner-up
2001–02	1st									
2002–03	1st									
2003–04	1st	14	30	8	5	17	50	71	29	Runner-up
2004–05	1st	15 (Note: Life Fighters refused to play in the promotion/relegation playoffs in protest of the league's decision to award them a 0-2 loss in Round 20 against United Africa Tigers for a "lack of security personnel." The playoff was postponed but ultimately continued without them while they appealed the decision. They were eventually relegated.)	30	7	5	18	35	55	26	1/8 finals
2005–06	2nd									1/16 finals
2006–07	2nd									
2007–08	2nd	11	20	4	1	15			13	
2008–09	2nd									1/16 finals
2009–10	3rd									
2010/14	?									
2014–15	2nd	6							29	1/8 finals
2015–16	2nd									
2016–17	1st	not held								1/8 finals
2017–18	1st	10	30	9	10	11	28	39	37	1/16 finals
2018–19	1st	5	28	12	5	11	45	43	41	
2019–20	1st	not held								

== Notable players ==
Below are the notable former players who have represented Life Fighters in the Namibia Premier League and international competition since the club's foundation in 1964. To appear in the section below, a player must have represented his country's national team either while playing for Life Fighters or after departing the club.

- (Namibia) Charlie Aoseb
- (Namibia) Isaskar Gurirab
- (Namibia) Steve Mbemukenga
- (Namibia) Chris Nauseb
- (Namibia) Milton Nauseb
- (Namibia) Oscar Tjikurunda

== Managers ==
- (Namibia) Eliah Tjazerua (early 2000s)
- (Namibia) Christy Guruseb (September 2017–January 2018)
- (Namibia) Turipamue Upi (January 2018–September 2018)
- (Namibia) Agnus Elemu (September 2018–)
