= Marcel Papama =

Namibian footballer

Personal information
- Date of birth: 28 April 1996 (age 30)
- Place of birth: Oshikuku, Namibia
- Height: 1.68 m (5 ft 6 in)
- Position: Midfielder

Team information
- Current team: African Stars

Senior career*
Years	Team	Apps	(Gls)
2013–2015	Young Africans		
2016	KK Palace		
2016–2018	UNAM		
2019–	African Stars		

International career^{‡}
2018–	Namibia	6	(0)
- * Club domestic league appearances and goals ‡ National team caps and goals as of 23 June 2019

Marcel Papama (born 28 April 1996) is a Namibian football player. He plays for African Stars.

== International ==
He made his Namibia national football team debut on 19 April 2018 in a friendly against Eswatini.

He was selected for the 2019 Africa Cup of Nations squad.
