= Edward Maova =

Namibian footballer

Personal information
- Date of birth: September 5, 1994 (age 32)
- Place of birth: Otjiwarongo, Namibia
- Height: 1.92 m (6 ft 3 1/2 in)
- Position: Goalkeeper

Team information
- Current team: Golden Arrows
- Number: 34

Senior career*
Years	Team	Apps	(Gls)
2012–2013	Rundu Chiefs		
2013–2018	Civics		
2018–2019	University of Pretoria	10	(0)
2019–2020	Royal Eagles	6	(0)
2020–2021	Civics		
2021–2022	TS Sporting	6	(0)
2022–2023	Pretoria Callies	18	(0)
2023–2024	University of Pretoria	34	(0)
2024–	Golden Arrows	22	(0)

International career^{‡}
2013	Namibia U20	4	(0)
2017–	Namibia	22	(0)
- * Club domestic league appearances and goals as of 4 January 2026 ‡ National team caps and goals as of 4 January 2026

Edward Maova (born 5 September 1994), is a Namibian professional footballer who plays as a goalkeeper for Golden Arrows and the Namibia national team.

== Career ==
Maova began his senior career in the Namibia Premier League with Rundu Chiefs in 2012. The following season, he moved to Civics where he spent 5 seasons. In 2019, he moved to South Africa to the first time with University of Pretoria, and followed that up with a stint at Royal Eagles. In 2020 he returned to Namibia with Civics, before moving back to South Africa with Sporting on 29 July 2021. In 2022, he had a year-long stint with Pretoria Callies before returning to the University of Pretoria for the 2023–24 season on 24 July 2023.

== International ==
Maova was part of the Namibia U20s at the 2013 COSAFA U-20 Cup, and was named goalkeeper of the tournament. In May 2013, he received his first call-up to the senior Namibia national team. He debuted with Namibia in a 1–0 (4–5) 2020 African Nations Championship qualification penalty shootout win over Zimbabwe on 23 July 2017. He was part of the national team at the 2022 COSAFA Cup, and was named the goalkeeper of the tournament. He was called up to the national team for the 2023 Africa Cup of Nations.

== Career statistics ==
=== International ===
As of match played 19 November 2024

Appearances and goals by national team and year
National team	Year	Apps	Goals
Namibia	2017	3	0
Namibia	2018	1	0
Namibia	2019	2	0
Namibia	2021	1	0
Namibia	2022	3	0
Namibia	2023	3	0
Namibia	2024	5	0
Total		18	0

== Honours ==
Civics

- Namibia FA Cup: 2020–21
