= Namibia First Division =

- Founded: 2006
- Country: Namibia
- Confederation: CAF
- Number of clubs: 26–39
- Level on pyramid: 2
- Promotion to: Namibia Premiership
- Relegation to: Regional Second Division

The First Division is the second-tier association football league in Namibia. It operates under the auspices of the Namibia Football Association.

== Organization ==
The First Division is divided into the Northern Stream (NSFD) and the Southern Stream (SSFD), each consisting of 13 teams from their respective regions. For some seasons the Northern Stream has been divided into separate North East and North West streams.

The Northern Stream includes clubs from the Zambezi, Kavango East, Kavango West, Oshana, Omusati, Kunene, Otjozondjupa, Ohangwena, and Oshikoto regions.

The Southern Stream includes clubs located in Khomas, Omaheke, Erongo, Hardap, and Karas regions.

== Promotion and relegation ==
The winners of both the Northern and Southern Streams are promoted to the Namibia Premier Football League. The three lowest placed teams from each stream are relegated to the Regional Second Division.

== History ==
The league began operating under the now-defunct Namibia Premier League for the 2006/07 season. In 2021 the league returned from a hiatus of over three years caused by troubles at the NFA and the COVID-19 pandemic. For this special transitional tournament, the league was divided into four streams: Southern, Coastal, Inland, and Central.

== Champions ==
Season	Stream		
	Northern	Southern	
2006–07	Windhoek Hotspurs	Fedics United	
2007–08	Chief Santos	Windhoek Hotspurs	
2008–09	United Stars	Blue Waters	
2009–10	Mighty Gunners	Blue Boys	
2010–11	United Stars	Monitronics Success College	
2011–12	Rundu Chiefs	Tura Magic	
2012–13	United Stars	Blue Boys	
	Northwest	Northeast	Southern
2013–14	Benfica	Touch & Go	Citizens
2014–15	Young Chiefs	Rundu Chiefs	Flamingos
2015–16	Life Fighters	Chief Santos	Young African
2016–17	Unknown		
2017–18	Military School Okahandja	Julinho Sporting	Young Brazilians
2018–19	Unknown		
2019–20	Not held		
2020–21	Not held		
2021–22	Not held		
2022–23	Okakarara Young Warriors	Eeshoke Chula Chula	Khomas NAMPOL
2023–24	KK Palace	Cuca Tops	Namibia Correctional Service
