= Nelson Geingob =

Namibian footballer

Personal information
- Date of birth: 6 April 1982 (age 44)
- Place of birth: Tsumeb, South West Africa
- Position: Defender

Senior career*
Years	Team	Apps	(Gls)
2003–2007	Chief Santos		
2007–2008	Black Africa		
2008–2009	Chief Santos		
2009–2010	Civics Windhoek		
2010–2017	Oshakati City		

International career
2003–2010	Namibia	10	(0)
- * Club domestic league appearances and goals

Nelson Geingob (born 6 April 1982) is a Namibian former footballer. He played for Namibian sides Chief Santos, Black Africa, Civics Windhoek and Oshakati City as well as for the Namibia national football team.
