= Isaskar Gurirab =

Namibian footballer

Personal information
- Date of birth: 1 March 1998 (age 28)
- Place of birth: Windhoek, Namibia
- Position: Forward

Team information
- Current team: Blue Waters

Senior career*
Years	Team	Apps	(Gls)
2018–2019	Life Fighters	24	(22)
2020–2022	Orlando Pirates	4	(8)

International career^{‡}
2019–2019	Namibia	12	(2)
- * Club domestic league appearances and goals as of 17 June 2019 ‡ National team caps and goals as of 19:20, 2 February 2022 (UTC)

Isaskar Gurirab (born 1 March 1998) is a Namibian professional footballer who plays as a forward for Blue Waters since August 2023. He scored in his first match since returning to the country from Orapa United in the Botswana Premiere League.

== Club career ==
Born in Uis in the Erongo Region, Gurirab was a fan of Orlando Pirates. After having an unsuccessful trial with the club, he joined Golden Bees FC from Outjo before moving on to Life Fighters. Gurirab was won the MVP and Golden Boot awards for the Namibia Premier League for the 2018–19 season after scoring 22 goals in 24 matches for Life Fighters. His club Life Fighters finished fifth in the league in what was Gurirab's first top-flight season. Following the season, Gurirab went on trial with Difaâ Hassani El Jadidi of the Moroccan Botola. However, it was cut short by injury. The Following year he finally moved to Orlando Pirates for the inaugural season of the Namibia Premier Football League. Gurirab took an early lead in the goal scoring race as he tallied eight goals shortly into the season, including five goals in the first two matches of the season.

== International career ==
Gurirab made his senior international debut on 28 May 2019 in a 2019 COSAFA Cup defeat to Malawi. Two days later he scored his first two senior international goals in a 3–0 victory over the Seychelles.

=== International goals ===
Scores and results list Namibia's goal tally first.

No	Date	Venue	Opponent	Score	Result	Competition
1.	30 May 2019	Princess Magogo Stadium, KwaMashu, South Africa	Seychelles	1–0	3–0	2019 COSAFA Cup
2.	30 May 2019	Princess Magogo Stadium, KwaMashu, South Africa	Seychelles	2–0	3–0	2019 COSAFA Cup
Last updated 2 February 2022

=== International career statistics ===
As of match played 11 July 2021

Namibia national team
Year	Apps	Goals
2019	7	2
2020	1	0
2021	4	0
2022	0	0
Total	12	0

== Honours ==
=== Individual ===
- Namibia Premier League player of the year: 2018–19
- Namibia Premier League top scorer: 2018–19
