= Eeshoke Chula Chula FC =

Namibian football club

- Founded: 1995
- Ground: Oshakati Independence Stadium
- Capacity: 8,000
- Chairman: Tamhila Ambrosius
- Manager: John Sikerete
- League: Namibia Premiership
- 2025–26: 2nd
- Website: https://www.facebook.com/ChulaChulaFc/

Eeshoke Chula Chula FC is a Namibian football club based in Eeshoke village near Oshikango in the Ohangwena Region which currently plays in the Namibia Premiership.

== Name ==
The club's name comes from a Okutyuulwa war cry “To tyuulwa keeshoke” which has been anglicized as "chulachula". The village name Eeshoke derives from a species of tall, sharp grass that is common in the area.

== Stadium ==
Eeshoke Chula Chula FC currently plays its home matches at the 8,000-seat Oshakati Independence Stadium until construction of the Eenhana Stadium in the region's capital of Eenhana is completed.

== History ==
The club formed informally as a small village team in 1995. It entered the Third Division in 1998. By 2001, the club had reached the Ohangwena Second Division. Between 2001 and 2013, the club bounced between the Second and Third Divisions. Chula Chula made a breakthrough in 2013, reaching the final of the Namibia FA Cup, ultimately falling 0–8 to Orlando Pirates. The club returned to the First Division in 2018 following an undefeated campaign in the third tier. However, financial problems and the COVID-19 pandemic caused a long absence of organized football beginning in Namibia prior to the 2019 season.

Chula Chula FC were champions of the North-East First Division when organized football returned to Namibia for the 2022/2023 season, earning promotion to the Namibia Premier Football League for the first time. Because of its popularity as the "people's team", the club signed a three-year sponsorship deal with PstBet worth N$1,8m per year.

In September 2023, the club played its first match in the top flight, securing a 2–1 victory over Mighty Gunners at its home Oshakati Independence Stadium. The club reported to have sold 17,275 tickets at the 8,000-seat stadium, a new league attendance record. The previous record of 7,000 spectators had stood since 2013. The club remained undefeated over the first five matches of the season and sat in fourth place in the league table at that point. During that period, Chula Chula drew 1–1 with reigning champions African Stars in front of a crowd of 38,000. The club continued to draw large crowds throughout the season.

In addition to the club's solid league play that season, Chula Chula went on to win the 9th annual Dr. Hage Geingob Cup, defeating favorites African Stars at Windhoek's Independence Stadium. In the process, Chula Chula became the first club to win the competition during its first participation. Fans voted for the two clubs that participated, choosing Chula Chula and African Stars after the clubs played the exciting 1–1 draw in front of a large crowd earlier that season.

== Recent seasons ==
Season	Pos	Record							
Season	Pos	P	W	D	L	GF	GA	GD	Pts
2023–24	5th	30	12	10	8	36	27	9	46
2024–25	7th	30	10	15	5	26	22	4	45
2025–26	2nd	30	16	9	5	35	20	15	57
