= Laurence Kaapama =

Namibian footballer

Lawrence Kaapama
Personal information
- Full name: Lawrence Bobby Kaapama
- Date of birth: 15 September 1983
- Place of birth: Windhoek, Namibia
- Date of death: 10 August 2013 (aged 29)
- Height: 1.85 m (6 ft 1 in)
- Position: Defender

Senior career*
Years	Team	Apps	(Gls)
2001–2004	Hotflames		
2004–2006	Dynamos		
2006–2007	United Africa Tigers		
2007–2008	SK Windhoek		
2008–2010	Eleven Arrows		
2010–2013	Civics		

International career
2002–2003	Namibia	5	(0)
- * Club domestic league appearances and goals

Laurence Kaapama (15 September 1983 – c. 10 August 2013) was a Namibian football defender. He played in Namibia, for Dynamos FC in South Africa and for the Namibian national team.

He was described as a "hard-as-nails defender" who was a strong header.

Kaapama died about 10 August 2013. No information has been made public but it is suspected to be due to an asthma attack.
