= Willy Stephanus =

Namibian footballer (born 1991)

Personal information
- Full name: Willy Patrick Stephanus
- Date of birth: 26 June 1991 (age 35)
- Place of birth: Mariental, Namibia
- Height: 1.78 m (5 ft 10 in)
- Position: Winger

Team information
- Current team: Hetten
- Number: 8

Senior career*
Years	Team	Apps	(Gls)
2009–2018	Black Africa SC		
- Bloemfontein Celtic
2015	→ Krabi (loan)	17	(3)
2018	→ AC Kajaani	14	(4)
2018	→ AC Kajaani	25	(7)
2019–2021	→ Lusaka Dynamos		
2022–2025	African Stars		
2025–	Hetten		

International career^{‡}
2011–	Namibia	59	(3)
- * Club domestic league appearances and goals as of 19:49, 27 February 2019 (CAT) ‡ National team caps and goals as of 17:22, 19 November 2024 (CAT)

Willy Patrick Stephanus (born 26 June 1991) is a Namibian professional footballer who plays as a winger for Saudi club Hetten and the Namibia national team. He has played for AC Kajaani in Finland.

On 1 September 2025, Stephanus joined Saudi SDL club Hetten.

== Career statistics ==
=== International ===
As of match played 19 November 2024

Appearances and goals by national team and year
National team	Year	Apps	Goals
Namibia	2011	5	0
Namibia	2012	8	0
Namibia	2013	8	1
Namibia	2014	4	0
Namibia	2015	9	2
Namibia	2016	3	0
Namibia	2018	4	0
Namibia	2019	5	0
Namibia	2021	10	0
Namibia	2022	1	0
Namibia	2024	2	0
Total		59	3

Scores and results list Namibia's goal tally first.

No	Date	Venue	Opponent	Score	Result	Competition
1.	13 July 2013	Nkoloma Stadium, Lusaka, Zambia	South Africa	1–2	1–2	2013 COSAFA Cup
2.	21 June 2015	Independence Stadium, Windhoek, Namibia	Zambia	1–1	2–1	2016 African Nations Championship qualification
3.	9 October 2015	Independence Stadium, Bakau, Gambia	Gambia	1–0	1–1	2018 FIFA World Cup qualification
4.	13 October 2015	Sam Nujoma Stadium, Windhoek, Namibia	Gambia	1–1	2–1	2018 FIFA World Cup qualification

== Honours ==
Black Africa SC

- Namibia Premier League: 2010–11, 2011–12, 2012–13, 2013–14

African Stars FC

- Namibia Premier Football League: 2022–23

Individual

- Namibia Premier Football League top scorer 2022–23
