= Rudi Louw =

Namibian footballer

Personal information
- Date of birth: 28 September 1985 (age 41)
- Place of birth: Windhoek, South West Africa
- Height: 1.65 m (5 ft 5 in)
- Position: Midfielder

Team information
- Current team: African Stars

Senior career*
Years	Team	Apps	(Gls)
2001–2002	Ramblers F.C.		
2002–2003	Blue Waters		
2004–2008	FC Civics		
2008	FC AK		
2009–2010	African Warriors		
2010–	Black Africa		

International career^{‡}
2005–2008	Namibia U-23	20	(5)
2008–2010	Namibia	5	(0)
- * Club domestic league appearances and goals as of February 18, 2007 ‡ National team caps and goals as of February 18, 2007

Rudi Louw (born 28 September 1985, in Windhoek) is a Namibian football midfielder currently playing for Black Africa. He is a member of the Namibia national football team.

Rudy Louw signed up for Black Africa, after spending three seasons with the double-league champions.

== Career ==
He holds 300 matches in the Namibia Premier League for different clubs, in which he has scored 88 goals to date.

== International ==
Louw played over 40 matches for the national junior teams in total on all levels and has turned out for the Brave Warriors five times and scored 15 goals.
