= Okahandja United FC =

Namibian football club

Okahandja United
- Full name: Okahandja United Football Club
- Founded: 2015 (as Military School FC)
- Ground: Nau-AIB Stadium, Okahandja
- Chairman: Johannes Hindjou
- Manager: Richard Gariseb
- League: Namibia Premiership
- 2025–26: 11th
- Website: https://www.facebook.com/okunitedfc/
| Home colours | Away colours |

Okahandja United FC is a Namibian association football club based in Okahandja. The club currently competes in the Namibia Premier Football League, the top level of football in Namibia.

== History ==
In 2018, under its original name of Okahandja Military School FC, the club defeated African Motto FC from Oshakati in the playoffs to be promoted to the Namibia Premier League. In mid-September 2018, the club was purchased by former Namibian international Johannes Hindjou and given its current name. Originally, the club was denied promotion to the Premier League because previously the club was owned by the Namibian Defence Force, the same ownership as another NPL club, Mighty Gunners. After the club was sold to Hindjou, it was in compliance with the Namibia Football Association's league statutes and was cleared to participate. Following the change in ownership, veteran Namibia coach Woody Jacobs was named manager.

Further controversy occurred the following month when sixteen players who helped win promotion were released by the club. While the players stated it was because they asked for a bonus they were promised, the club maintained that the new manager Jacobs was bringing in his own players who he felt were capable of competing in the top flight. Just a week later, another bombshell revelation occurred when the Namibian Defense Force sent a letter to the NFA stating that they were still the legal owners of the club because they were not informed and did not consent to the sale. The letter was sent despite the first letter notifying the NFA being signed by the brigadier-general of the military school. Local media believed the NDA tried to go back on the deal after Hindjou stated that the former owners of Military School FC owned the former players bonuses, not him.

After football leagues were cancelled in Namibia for several seasons, mostly because of a dispute between the NFA and the Namibia Premier League, Okahandja United FC was part of the inaugural campaign of the newly-formed Namibia Premier Football League for the 2022–23 season. The club won its first-ever top-flight match 2–1 on matchday one at their home Nau-AIB Stadium against Mighty Gunners. The club was lead in the campaign by head coach Richard Gariseb and captained by Stanley Scheeffers. Following matchday three, Okahandja United sat atop the league table with seven points.

== Performance ==
| Season | League | Place |
|---|---|---|
| 2017/18 | First Division (North-East) | 1st |
| 2018/19 | Namibia Premier League | 12th |
| 2019/20 | No League | |
| 2020/21 | No League | |
| 2021/22 | No League | |
| 2022/23 | Namibia Premier Football League | 6th |

== Honours ==
- First Division (North-East)

Champions: 2018/19
