= Maleagi Ngarizemo =

Namibian footballer

Marley Ngarizemo
Personal information
- Full name: Maleagi Ngarizemo
- Date of birth: 21 June 1979 (age 47)
- Place of birth: Windhoek, South-West Africa
- Height: 1.88 m (6 ft 2 in)
- Position: Defender

Youth career
- 1993–1999: Mydae Chiefs

Senior career*
Years	Team	Apps	(Gls)
2000–2003	Mydatjies	91	(0)
2004	African Stars	9	(0)
2005	Civics	11	(0)
2006–2007	African Stars	24	(0)
2007–2008	F.C. Cape Town	34	(1)
2009	Black Leopards	4	(0)
2010	North York Astros		
2011	WSA Winnipeg		
2012	North York Astros		

International career
2001–2008	Namibia	9	(0)
- * Club domestic league appearances and goals

Maleagi Ngarizemo (born 21 June 1979) is a retired Namibian footballer.

== Club career ==
Nagrizemo has played for Mydatjies, United Africa Tigers, Phungo All Stars and African Stars F.C. in Namibia and South Africa for F.C. Cape Town and Black Leopards.

In 2010, he joined North York Astros in the Canadian Soccer League.

== International career ==
Ngarizemo is a member of the Namibia national football team since 2001 and played with the team at the 2008 Africa Cup of Nations.
