= Panduleni Nekundi =

Namibian footballer

Personal information
- Full name: Halleluya Panduleni Nekundi
- Date of birth: 14 September 1998 (age 28)
- Place of birth: Oranjemund, Namibia
- Height: 1.80 m (5 ft 11 in)
- Position: Forward

Team information
- Current team: African Stars

Senior career*
Years	Team	Apps	(Gls)
2009–2010	UNAM FC		
2010–2012	SK Windhoek		
2012–2015	United Africa Tigers		
2015–2017	UNAM FC		
2017–	African Stars		

International career^{‡}
2014–	Namibia	11	(2)
- * Club domestic league appearances and goals ‡ National team caps and goals as of 14 May 2020

Halleluya Panduleni Nekundi (born 14 September 1998) is a Namibian footballer who plays as a forward for African Stars F.C. and the Namibia national football team.

== Career ==
=== International ===
Nekundi made his senior international debut on 4 January 2014 in a 1-0 friendly defeat to Ghana. In his next appearance, he scored his first senior international goal, equalizing late in a 1-1 friendly draw with Tanzania.

=== International goals ===
Scores and results list Namibia's goal tally first.

Goal	Date	Venue	Opponent	Score	Result	Competition
1.	5 March 2014	Sam Nujoma Stadium, Windhoek, Namibia	Tanzania	1–1	1–1	Friendly
2.	18 January 2018	Stade de Marrakech, Marrakesh, Morocco	Uganda	1–0	1–0	2018 African Nations Championship

== Career statistics ==
=== International ===
As of matches played 19 October 2019.

National team	Year	Apps	Goals
Namibia	2014	3	1
Namibia	2018	6	1
Namibia	2019	2	0
Total		11	2
