= Rundu Sports Stadium =

Sports venue in Rundu, Namibia

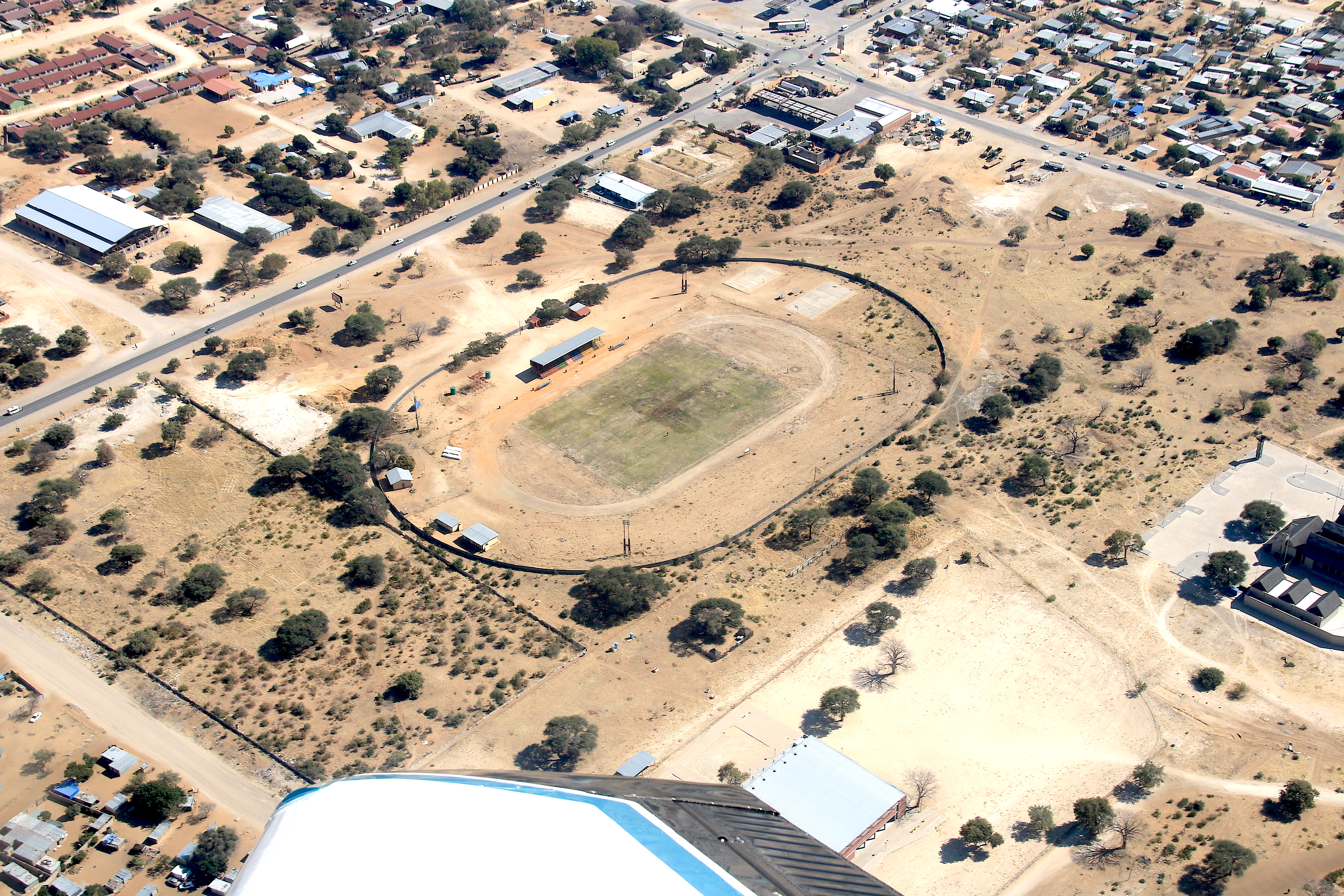
- Stadium from the air, 2019
- Interactive map of Rundu Sports Stadium
- Location: Rundu, Kavango East, Namibia
- Coordinates: 17.9241°S 19.7729°E
- Capacity: 500
- Surface: Grass

Construction
- Built: 1992
- Renovated: 2016

Tenants
- Cuca Tops; Julinho Sporting

The Rundu Sports Stadium is an association football stadium in Rundu, Namibia with seating for 500 spectators. The grass-surface stadium is also capable of hosting athletics, netball, and basketball matches and is the only stadium in the Kavango East and Kavango West regions. The stadium is the home venue of Julinho Sporting and Cuca Tops of the Namibia Premiership and Rundu Chiefs and United Stars of the Namibia First Division.

== History ==
The stadium was constructed in 1992. In 2016 the stadium underwent a renovation, including the installation of its first-ever floodlighting, in preparation to host several high-profile football tournaments. By 2021 the stadium was in need of major restoration and repair. Namibian silver-medal Olympian Christine Mboma decried the state of the running track and called for one of international standard.
