= Aprocius Petrus =

Namibian footballer

Personal information
- Full name: Aprocius Megameno Petrus
- Date of birth: 9 October 1999 (age 27)
- Place of birth: Walvis Bay, Namibia
- Height: 1.82 m (6 ft 0 in)
- Position: Left back

Team information
- Current team: Cape Town City FC
- Number: 4

Senior career*
Years	Team	Apps	(Gls)
2017–2021	Eleven Arrows		
2021–2022	Blue Waters		
2022–2024	Liria Prizren	13	(1)
2024–2025	Cape Town City FC	17	(0)
2025-	Al-Hilal	8	(0)

International career^{‡}
2018–	Namibia	55	(0)
Medal record
Men's football
Representing Namibia
COSAFA Cup
Runner-up	2024 South Africa
- * Club domestic league appearances and goals as of 15 June 2024 ‡ National team caps and goals as of 19 November 2024

Aprocius Megameno Petrus (born 9 October 1999) is a Namibian footballer who plays as a Defensive Midfielder for Al-Hilal and the Namibia national team. He helped Namibia become runners-up in the 2022 COSAFA Cup, losing the final to Zambia.

== Career statistics ==
=== International ===
As of match played 19 November 2024

Appearances and goals by national team and year
National team	Year	Apps	Goals
Namibia	2018	1	0
Namibia	2019	7	0
Namibia	2021	10	0
Namibia	2022	3	0
Namibia	2023	7	0
Namibia	2024	18	0
Total		46	0
