= George Hummel =

Namibian footballer (born 1976)

Personal information
- Date of birth: 9 February 1976 (age 50)
- Place of birth: Mariental, South West Africa
- Height: 1.80 m (5 ft 11 in)
- Position: Defender

Youth career
- Tornado FC

Senior career*
Years	Team	Apps	(Gls)
- Orlando Pirates
- NamPol
1998–1999	Chief Santos		
1999–2003	Hellenic	65	(3)
2003–2004	Moroka Swallows	13	(0)
2004	Luch-Energiya Vladivostok	7	(0)
2005–2008	Moroka Swallows	23	(1)
2008–2009	Jomo Cosmos		
2009–2011	Eleven Arrows		
- Blue Waters

International career
1995–2009	Namibia	41	(2)

Managerial career
- 2013: Blue Boys
- * Club domestic league appearances and goals

George Hummel (born 9 February 1976) is a Namibian retired professional footballer who played as a defender.

== Club career ==
Born in Mariental, Hummel started his career at Orlando Pirates before joining Chief Santos where he impressed to earn him a move to and a career in South Africa. Nicknamed Road Block, the burly defender started as a forward and is the only Namibian footballer to play in Russia.

== International career ==
Hummel made his debut for Namibia in a January 1995 Africa Nations Cup qualification match away against Guinea and earned a total of 41 caps, scoring 2 goals. He retired from the national team in 2007 after being accused to be a disruptive influence in the Brave Warriors ' camp, but returned in 2008.

== Personal life ==
Hummel is married to Shandel and the couple has five children. He worked as a policeman while playing for Santos, but now works mainly in the construction business. He briefly managed Swakopmund outfit Blue Boys, earning promotion to the NPL with them.
