= Namibia Super Cup =

The Namibian Super Cup, commercially known as the Standard Bank Super Cup, is a one-off match between champions of Namibia Premier League and NFA Cup.

Standard Bank was named as title sponsor after agreeing to a three-year deal with the Namibia Football Association for the naming rights.
