= Johnny Doeseb =

Namibian businessman

Johnny Doeseb (born 1975 in Omaruru) is a Namibian businessperson and former owner of Eleven Arrows F.C. in Walvis Bay. He owns a construction business. In 2008, although he was a fan of Black Africa football club, he bought Eleven Arrows F.C of the Namibia Premier League and built a player's village in the Kuisbemond area of Walvis Bay.
