= Jerome Louis =

Namibian footballer (born 1987)

Jerome Louis (born 23 September 1987) is a Namibian footballer who currently plays for Botswana side Township Rollers F.C.

He joined Township Rollers in 2013 from Black Africa S.C., where he became top goalscorer of the Namibia Premier League in 2008–09, 2009–10 and 2011–12. He also won the league title in 2010–11, 2011–12, 2012–13 and the Botswana title in 2013–14. To date he has been capped thirteen times for the Namibia national football team.

== Honours ==
=== Individual ===
- Mascom Top 8 Cup Top Goalscorer: 2014
