= Dynamo Fredericks =

Namibian footballer

Personal information
- Full name: Dynamo Carlos Fredericks
- Date of birth: 4 April 1992 (age 34)
- Place of birth: Windhoek, Namibia
- Height: 1.66 m (5 ft 5 1/2 in)
- Position: Centre-back

Team information
- Current team: Black Africa

Senior career*
Years	Team	Apps	(Gls)
2010–2011	Ramblers		
2011–2013	Civics Windhoek		
2013–	Black Africa		

International career^{‡}
2016–	Namibia	26	(1)
- * Club domestic league appearances and goals as of 20:26, 9 May 2020 (UTC) ‡ National team caps and goals as of 20:26, 9 May 2020 (UTC)

Dynamo Carlos Fredericks (born 4 April 1992) is a Namibian footballer who plays as a centre-back for Black Africa and the Namibia national football team.

== Club career ==
Born in Windhoek, Fredericks started his career at Ramblers in 2010, before signing for Civics Windhoek in 2011. After two years at Civics Windhoek, Fredericks signed for Black Africa in 2013.

== International career ==
Fredericks made his debut for Namibia in 2016 in a 3–1 victory against Burundi. Fredericks was called up to the Namibia squad for the 2019 Africa Cup of Nations but failed to make an appearance as Namibia were knocked out in the group stage.

== Career statistics ==
=== International ===
As of 9 May 2020

Appearances and goals by national team and year
National team	Year	Apps	Goals
Namibia
Namibia	2016	5	0
Namibia	2017	6	0
Namibia	2018	6	0
Namibia	2019	9	1
Total		26	1

=== International goals ===
As of 9 May 2020. Namibia score listed first, score column indicates score after each Fredericks goal.

International goals by date, venue, cap, opponent, score, result and competition
No.	Date	Venue	Cap	Opponent	Score	Result	Competition	Ref.
1	26 July 2019	Stade de Moroni, Moroni, Comoros	4	Comoros	2–0	2–0	Friendly	
