= Ananias Gebhardt =

Namibian footballer

Personal information
- Full name: Ananias Junior Gebhardt
- Date of birth: 8 September 1988 (age 38)
- Place of birth: Okahandja, South West Africa
- Height: 1.78 m (5 ft 10 in)
- Position: Left-back

Team information
- Current team: Baroka
- Number: 3

Senior career*
Years	Team	Apps	(Gls)
2006–2008	Invincible		
2008–2010	Ramblers		
2010–2013	United Africa Tigers		
2013–2016	Black Africa		
2016	Casa de Portugal		
2016–2018	Jomo Cosmos	43	(2)
2018–	Baroka	35	(1)

International career^{‡}
2011–	Namibia	41	(2)
- * Club domestic league appearances and goals as of 18:55, 28 October 2020 (UTC) ‡ National team caps and goals as of 18:55, 28 October 2020 (UTC)

Ananias Junior Gebhardt (born 8 September 1988) is a Namibian professional footballer who plays as a left-back for South African Premier Division side Baroka.
