= Sydney Plaatjies =

Namibian footballer (born 1981)

Personal information
- Full name: Sydney Convinus Plaatjies
- Date of birth: 25 November 1981 (age 44)
- Place of birth: Mariental, South West Africa
- Height: 1.84 m (6 ft 1/2 in)
- Position: Winger

Senior career*
Years	Team	Apps	(Gls)
- Refugees FC
–2006	Blue Waters		
2006–2008	Jomo Cosmos	28	(2)
2008–2009	Mamelodi Sundowns	4	(0)
2009	→ Moroka Swallows (loan)	7	(0)
2010	Kabuscorp		
2010–2011	Mpumalanga Black Aces	5	(0)
2012	Đồng Tháp	13	(0)
2013–2017	Blue Boys		

International career
2000–2011	Namibia	38	(2)
- * Club domestic league appearances and goals

Sydney Convinus Plaatjies (born 25 November 1981) is a Namibian former footballer who played as a midfielder. He played club football for Refugees FC, Blue Waters, Jomo Cosmos, Mamelodi Sundowns, Moroka Swallows, Kabuscorp, Mpumalanga Black Aces, Đồng Tháp and Blue Boys and international football for the Namibia national football team, where he was part of the Namibia squad for the 2008 Africa Cup of Nations.

== Club career ==
Born in Mariental, Plaatjies started his career at Namibian lower league side Refugees FC before later joining Blue Waters. In March 2006, Plaatjies signed for South African Premier Division side Jomo Cosmos on a two-year contract. Over two years at the club, he scored twice in 28 appearances before leaving the club in the summer of 2008 to join fellow South African Premier Division side Mamelodi Sundowns. He made 4 appearances for Sundowns before, in January 2009, he joined Moroka Swallows on loan until the end of the season, with the option to sign him permanently. He made 7 appearances for the club, though his loan spell was not made permanent. He was released by the club in November 2009.

Following his release, he had a trial period with Mpumalanga Black Aces, before a short spell with Angolan side Kabuscorp. Plaatjies signed for South African Premier Division side Mpumalanga Black Aces on a short-term deal in December 2010. However, Plaatjies made just 5 league appearances for the club before being released by the club later that season. He subsequently joined Vietnamese side Đồng Tháp where he made 13 appearances, before returning to Namibia in 2013 to play for Blue Boys.

== International career ==
Having previously played for Namibia at under-19 and under-20 levels, Plaatjies made his debut for Namibia in 2001 against Zambia. He was part of the Namibia squads at the 2005 COSAFA Cup, the 2006 COSAFA Cup, the 2008 Africa Cup of Nations and the 2009 COSAFA Cup. He amassed a total of 24 caps for Namibia, scoring twice.

== Style of play ==
Plaatjies was left footed and played as a winger.
