= Brian Isaacs =

Namibian association footballer

Personal information
- Date of birth: 17 November 1967 (age 58)
- Place of birth: Windhoek, Namibia
- Position: Midfielder

Senior career*
Years	Team	Apps	(Gls)
1986–1988	Civics		
1989–1991	Black Africa		
1992–1995	Civics		

International career
1992	Namibia	2	(0)

Managerial career
- 2010–2011: Namibia
- Black Africa
- * Club domestic league appearances and goals

Brian Isaacs (born 17 November 1967) is a Namibian footballer and manager who manages Black Africa.

== Early life ==
Isaacs was born and raised in Windhoek, Namibia, and was regarded as a Namibian prospect.

== Career ==
Isaacs started his managerial career managing a school team. He became the first Namibian manager to win six league titles with three clubs. He has also worked at the Ministry of Health and Social Services.
