= Armando Pedro =

Angolan footballer and coach

Personal information
- Date of birth: 2 September 1971
- Place of birth: Moçâmedes, Angola
- Position: Forward

Youth career
- Atlético Petróleos do Namibe

Senior career*
Years	Team	Apps	(Gls)
- Atlético Petróleos do Namibe
- African United F.C.
- Liverpool Okahandja
1993–1996	Blue Waters F.C.		
1996-xxxx	Hellenic F.C.		
- African Wanderers F.C.
- Blue Waters F.C.

Managerial career
- Blue Waters F.C.
- Blue Waters F.C. (assistant)
- * Club domestic league appearances and goals

Armando Pedro (born 2 September 1971 in Moçâmedes, Angola) is an Angolan football coach and retired footballer who coaches Blue Waters of the Namibia Premier League.

== Namibia ==
Journeying to Namibia through his friend who was a member of the People's Liberation Army of Namibia, Pedro first competed for the Ongwediva-based African United but had difficulty communicating with the locals. Soon, he was invited to trial for Liverpool Okahandja but African United needed him for a tournament. However, after winning the competition the Angolan decided to go to Blue Waters instead, forming an attack partnership with Striker Muaine and propelling Blue Waters to the 1994 Namibia FA Cup and 1996 Namibia Premier League titles. Spending some years in South Africa, the talismanic forward returned to the club in 2005, leading their front line in the CAF Champions league as well as the domestic championship. Serving as assistant and interim coach for Blue Waters in the wake of his retirement, Pedro severed his 14-year tie with them to concentrate on business in 2016, opening a clothing shop in Walvis Bay.
