= Khomasdal Stadium =

Stadium in Khomasdal, Windhoek, Namibia

Coordinates: 22°32′28″S 17°03′35″E

Khomasdal Stadium is a stadium in Khomasdal, a suburb of Windhoek, Namibia. It was originally constructed school sports, church activities and youth groups but has become the main stadium for a number of Namibia's top professional football clubs, including Orlando Pirates, tigers, Civics, African Stars and Black Africa. It became the home stadium of those clubs when Sam Nujoma Stadium, which is also in Katutura, underwent changes due to FIFA regulations.

== Facilities ==
In February 2009, the Namibian newspaper reported that the stadium had no toilet facilities, no VIP section and very limited parking facilities. The stadium has only two exits, which is considered dangerous.
