= KK Palace FC =

Namibian football club

- Full name: King Kauluma Palace Football Club
- Nickname: The Lions
- Founded: 1993
- Ground: Oshakati Independence Stadium
- Capacity: 8,000
- League: Namibia Premiership
- 2025–26: 5th

KK Palace is an association football team in Ondangwa, Namibia.

They gained fame on January 23, 2004 by winning one of history's longest Penalty Shootouts. Following a 2-2 draw in the first round of the NFA Cup, they defeated F.C. Civics Windhoek 17–16 after a staggering 48 kicks. At that time, Civics were the leader of the Namibian first division, while KK Palace played in second division. A common rumour is that this was the final match of the tournament, but this is verifiably untrue: In fact, KK Palace was knocked out in the second round after losing 0–3 to Black Africa S.C. The tournament was eventually won by Ramblers F.C., who defeated KK Palace-defeaters Black Africa in the final.

The club were champions of the First Division North West for the 2022-2023 season, qualifying for the Namibia Premiership for the first time since 2011.
