= Junior Petrus =

Namibian footballer (born 2000)

Personal information
- Full name: Junior Simaneka John Iyaalo Petrus
- Date of birth: 17 June 2000 (age 26)
- Place of birth: Namibia
- Position: Forward

Team information
- Current team: Liria Prizren
- Number: 23

Senior career*
Years	Team	Apps	(Gls)
2019–2023	Blue Waters		
2023–	Liria Prizren	15	(1)

International career^{‡}
2021–	Namibia	4	(0)
- * Club domestic league appearances and goals as of 1 January 2024 ‡ National team caps and goals as of 22 November 2023 (UTC)

Junior Simaneka John Iyaalo Petrus (born 17 June 2000) is a Namibian professional footballer who plays for Football Superleague of Kosovo club Liria Prizren and the Namibia national team.

== Club career ==
Petrus started his career for the local club Blue Waters.

On 15 July 2023, he signed for Football Superleague of Kosovo club Liria Prizren. On 13 August 2023, he made his club debut in the 1–0 loss to Ballkani.

== International career ==
On 5 May 2023, Petrus made his international debut in the 1–1 draw against South Africa.
