= Diergaardt =

Diergaardt may refer to:

- Floris Diergaardt (born 1980), Namibian football striker
- Hans Diergaardt (1927–1998), Namibian politician
- Johan Diergaardt, Namibian rugby union coach
- Reggie Diergaardt (born 1957), Namibian politician and former member of the National Assembly of Namibia
- Theo Diergaardt (1969/70–2020), Namibian politician and Member of Parliament
- Diergaarde Blijdorp, a zoo in Rotterdam, Netherlands
