= William Chilufya =

Zambian footballer (born 1983)

William Chilufya (born 25 December 1983 in Lusaka) is a Zambian footballer, whose last known club was 1º de Maio, of the Angolan league in 2011.

== Career ==
The striker played previously with FC Civics of the Namibia Premier League, who was in the 2004–2005 season, named as the Namibia Sport Player of the Year. In 2007, Chilufya led the league in scoring with 17 goals. A feat also achieved in the 2001/02 league.

=== Clubs ===
- 1998-2000 Katima Mulimo Wanderers
- 2000-2002 Liverpool
- 2002-2003 Blue Waters
- 2003-2008 FC Civics
- 2008–2009 Estrela Clube Primeiro de Maio
