= 2024–25 Premier League (disambiguation) =

The 2024–25 Premier League was a professional association football league season in England.

2024–25 Premier League may also refer to:

== Association football ==
- 2024–25 Armenian Premier League
- 2024–25 Azerbaijan Premier League
- 2024–25 Bangladesh Premier League
- 2024–25 Premier League of Bosnia and Herzegovina
- 2024–25 Cambodian Premier League
- 2024–25 Egyptian Premier League
- 2024–25 Ghana Premier League
- 2024–25 Hong Kong Premier League
- 2024–25 Israeli Premier League
- 2024–25 Lebanese Premier League
- 2024–25 Maltese Premier League
- 2024–25 Namibia Premier League
- 2024–25 Russian Premier League
- 2024–25 Ukrainian Premier League
- 2024–25 Welsh Premier League

== Basketball ==
- 2024–25 Israeli Basketball Premier League
