= Paulus Shipanga =

Namibian footballer (born 1980)

Personal information
- Full name: Paulus Shipanga
- Date of birth: 19 May 1980 (age 46)
- Place of birth: Namibia
- Height: 1.69 m (5 ft 7 in)
- Position: Forward

Senior career*
Years	Team	Apps	(Gls)
- Blue Waters
- Sabah FA
- Wits University FC
- Eleven Arrows F.C.
- Bay United FC
- Manila Nomads FC

International career^{‡}
- Namibia
- * Club domestic league appearances and goals as of 1 November 2015 ‡ National team caps and goals as of 1 November 2015

Paulus Shipanga (born 19 May 1980) is a retired Namibian footballer. He currently manages Namibia Premier League outfit Black Africa. In his playing days he also featured in the Namibian national team.
