= DTS Windhoek FC =

Namibian football club

- Full name: Deutscher Turn- und Sport Verein Windhoek Fussball Club
- Founded: 2021
- Ground: DTS Sport Field
- Chairman: Axel Dainat
- Manager: Gunnar von Dewitz
- League: First Division
- 2021: TBD
- Website: https://www.dts.org.na/

DTS Windhoek FC (also known as DTS-HOPSOL for sponsorship reasons) is a Namibian football club based in Windhoek which currently plays in the First Division, the second-tier competition in the country.

== History ==
The larger sport club Deutscher Turn- und Sport Verein (DTS) was formed in 1961. In April 2021 it was announced that the club would field a senior football team in the revamped First Division beginning with the 2021 season with the goal of creating a professional pathway and environment for Namibian players. The team would go by the moniker DTS-HOPSOL thanks to a sponsorship by solar power company HOPSOL, with additional sponsorship from Standard Bank.

On 26 March 2021 the team played its first match, a 3–2 friendly victory against Tigers F.C. of the Namibia Premier Football League. On 10 April, the team played a second friendly against a NPFL club, this time Orlando Pirates, earning a 2–1 victory. At the time of the unveiling, Namibia international Oliver Risser was announced as a player-coach.

The club played its first league match on 22 May 2021, resulting in a victory over Western Hotspurs FC. During its inaugural season in the First Division, the club was crowned champions of the league's Southern Stream.

== Honours ==
- First Division Southern Stream: 2021
