= 2025–26 Namibia Premiership =

Namibia Premiership
- Season: 2025–26
- Dates: October 2025 – April 2026
- Champions: African Stars
- Relegated: United Africa Tigers, Life Fighters, Rundu Chiefs

The 2025–26 Namibia Premiership was the fourth season of the Namibia Premiership, the top-tier football league in Namibia. African Stars were the reigning champions, and retained their title, winning the league for the fourth consecutive season, finishing one point ahead of Eeshoke Chula Chula.

Tigers, one of Namibia's oldest clubs, Rundu Chiefs and Life Fighters were relegated.

== League table ==
Pos	Team	Pld	W	D	L	GF	GA	GD	Pts	Qualification or relegation
1	African Stars (C, Q)	30	16	10	4	45	18	+27	58	Champions, Qualification to the 2025–26 CAF Champions League
2	Eeshoke Chula Chula	30	16	9	5	35	20	+15	57	
3	Mighty Gunners	30	14	7	9	43	26	+17	49	
4	Ongos	30	11	15	4	30	17	+13	48	
5	KK Palace	30	11	12	7	39	31	+8	45	
6	Blue Waters	30	11	11	8	42	29	+13	44	
7	UNAM	30	9	16	5	27	21	+6	43	
8	Eleven Arrows	30	10	11	9	34	36	−2	41	
9	Julinho Sporting	30	11	7	12	34	32	+2	40	
10	Bucks Buccaneers	30	9	12	9	31	34	−3	39	
11	Okahandja United	30	10	6	14	30	39	−9	36	
12	Young African	30	8	9	13	30	39	−9	33	
13	Khomas NAMPOL	30	9	6	15	32	42	−10	33	
14	United Africa Tigers (R)	30	6	9	15	28	45	−17	27	Relegation to First Division
15	Life Fighters (R)	30	6	7	17	28	59	−31	25	Relegation to First Division
16	Rundu Chiefs (R)	30	4	11	15	24	44	−20	23	Relegation to First Division

(C) Champions; (Q) Qualified for the phase indicated; (R) Relegated
