= Kuisebmond =

Township of Walvis Bay, Namibia

Coordinates: 22.929450°S 14.531415°E

Kuisebmond is a township of Walvis Bay, Namibia, named after the Kuiseb River. With a population of 40,000, most residents of Walvis Bay live in the area. During the apartheid era, the area was reserved for Black Namibians who worked in Walvis Bay.

In 2008 Kuisebmond had the second highest HIV infection rate in the country. Kuisebmond Stadium, home to Eleven Arrows and Blue Waters football clubs, is located in the suburb.
