= Seth Boois =

Namibian footballer and manager

Seth Boois (died 2020) was a Namibian football manager and footballer.

== Playing career ==
Besides playing football as a youth player, Boois was also a boxer.

== Managerial career ==
After working as manager of the Namibia national football team, Boois worked as technical director of the Namibia national football team.

== Writing career ==
Boois wrote two books about Namibian football.

== Personal life and death ==
Boois was born in Otjiwarongo, Namibia, and grew up supporting Namibian side Black Africa S.C.

Boois was married to Yvonne Boois and had children. He died in 2020 after suffering from COVID-19.
