= J. Stephanus Stadium =

Building in Namibia

Coordinates: 26°35′31″S 18°09′00″E

J. Stephanus Stadium is a sports venue in Keetmanshoop in the ǁKaras Region of southern Namibia. It is the home stadium of Fedics United F.C. of the Namibia Premier League.
