= Cuca Tops FC =

Namibian football club

- Founded: 1974
- Ground: Rundu Sports Stadium
- Capacity: 500
- Chairman: Herculano Mwenyo
- Manager: Gundolf Mukoya
- League: Namibia Premiership
- 2024–25: 16th in Premiership (relegated)

Cuca Tops FC is a Namibian football club based in Rundu which currently plays in the Namibia Premiership.

== History ==
Cuca Tops FC was established in 1974 and is the oldest football club in Rundu and the entire Kavango East region. The club won the First Division North East for the 2023/2024 season and earned promotion to the Namibia Premiership. It would be the club's first season in Namibia's top flight since the 2002/2003 season, a twenty-two year absence.

== Domestic history ==
Key

Champion Runners-up 3rd Place

Season	League										Domestic Cup	Notes
Season	Div.	Pos.	Pl.	W	D	L	GF	GA	GD	P	Domestic Cup	Notes
2002–03	1st	16th	29	3	5	21			-66	15		Relegated to First Division
2024–25	1st											

== Honours ==
- First Division North East Stream

Winners: 2023/2024
