= Namibia Regional Second Division =

Regional Second Division
- Country: Namibia
- Confederation: CAF
- Level on pyramid: 3
- Promotion to: First Division

The Regional Second Division is an association of 14 regional football leagues which together comprise the third-tier of football in Namibia. It operates under the auspices of the Namibia Football Association.

== Organization ==
Each of the 14 regions of Namibia operates its own Regional Second Division league. In 2019 a FIFA Normalisation Committee worked with the regional associations to meet requirements to be in compliance as members of the NFA.

== Promotion ==
The winners of each regional league enters a play-off competition to determine promotion to the First Division.
