= Shepherd Murape =

Zimbabwean footballer and manager (born 1949)

Personal information
- Date of birth: 26 July 1949 (age 77)
- Place of birth: Rhodesia
- Positions: Centre-back; midfielder

Senior career*
Years	Team	Apps	(Gls)
1965–1978	Dynamos		

International career
1969	Rhodesia		

Managerial career
- 1976–1981: Dynamos
- 1981–1983: Zimbabwe
- 1983–1985: Black Rhinos
- 1990–1994: Bloemfontein Celtic
- 1994: Orlando Pirates
- 1994–1995: Namibia
- 1995: Real Rovers
- 1995–1996: QwaQwa Stars
- 1996–1997: Moroka Swallows
- 1997–1998: Black Leopards
- 1998–2000: Amazulu
- 2000–2001: Manning Rangers
- 2004–2007: Blue Waters
- 2008: Black Leopards
- 2011: Batau
- 2013: Dynamos
- 2013-2014: Witbank Spurs
- 2016–2021: Magesi
- 2022–2023: Zimbabwe
- 2022–2023: Zimbabwe U20
- 2022–2023: Zimbabwe U23
- * Club domestic league appearances and goals

Shepherd Murape (born 26 July 1949) is a Zimbabwean football manager and former player manages the Zimbabwe national team.

== Career ==
A centre-back or midfielder, Murape played club football for Harare side Dynamos F.C. and for the Rhodesia national team.

In 1976, he became a player-manager for Dynamos, and helped lead the club to several league titles. He went on to manage newly formed Black Rhinos F.C. in 1983.

Murape has had stints with QwaQwa Stars F.C., Real Rovers F.C., AmaZulu, Moroka Swallows, Black Leopards, Orlando Pirates and Manning Rangers in South Africa. He led Blue Waters to the Namibian league title in 2004.

Murape managed the Zimbabwe national team during 1981. In 1994, he became the first person to manage Namibia national team following its independence.

Murape was appointed manager of South African National First Division club Magesi in October 2016.
