= Floris Diergaardt =

Namibian football striker

Personal information
- Date of birth: 23 December 1980 (age 45)
- Place of birth: Windhoek, South West Africa
- Height: 1.80 m (5 ft 11 in)
- Position: Striker

Team information
- Current team: FC Civics
- Number: 9

Youth career
- 1998–1999: Germania Schnelsen
- 1999–2000: Young Ones FC

Senior career*
Years	Team	Apps	(Gls)
2000–2001	Ajax Cape Town FC		
2001–2002	Avendale Athletico		
2002–present	FC Civics		

International career^{‡}
1999–	Namibia	22	(1)
Medal record
Men's football
Representing Namibia
COSAFA Cup
Runner-up	1999 Southern Africa
- * Club domestic league appearances and goals as of 28 February 2007 ‡ National team caps and goals as of 28 February 2007

Floris Diergaardt (born 23 September 1980 in Windhoek) is a Namibian football striker currently playing for FC Civics. He is a member of the Namibia national football team.

Early in his career, Diergaardt played in the fourth-tier German Oberliga with TuS Germania Schnelsen.

== Club history ==
- 1998/1999 Germania Schnelsen (D)
- 1999/2000 Young Ones FC
- 2000/2001 Ajax Cape Town (SA)
- 2001/2002 Avendale Athletico (SA)

== Honours ==
Namibia

- COSAFA Cup: Runner-up, 1999
