= Kuisebmond Stadium =

Sports venue in Namibia

Coordinates: 22°55′55″S 14°31′43″E

Kuisemund Stadium
- Interactive map of Kuisemund Stadium
- Location: Walvis Bay, Namibia
- Capacity: 4,000
- Surface: Grass

Kuisebmond Stadium is an open-air stadium in Walvis Bay, Namibia. It is home to several teams in the Namibia Premier Football League, including the Eleven Arrows and Blue Waters football clubs. The stadium has capacity for 4,000 spectators.

Kuisebmond Stadium takes its name from the mouth of the Kuiseb River, located south of Walvis Bay. The stadium was renovated in 2009 at a cost of three million Namibian dollars.

On January 13, 2021, Robert Hamukonda, aged 34, hanged himself in the stadium following a domestic argument.
