= Fedics United F.C. =

Namibian football club

Fedics United F.C. is a football (soccer) team in Keetmanshoop, ǁKaras Region, Namibia. They play in the Namibia Premier League at J. Stephanus Stadium.
