= Young African FC =

Namibian football club

- Full name: Young African Football Club
- Founded: 2013
- Ground: Legare Stadium, Gobabis
- Chairman: Maleagi Ngarizemo
- League: Namibia Premiership
- 2025–26: 12th
Home colours	Away colours

Young African FC is a Namibian football club playing in the Namibia Premiership and is based in Gobabis. It was founded in 2013 by former Namibian international Maleagi Ngarizemo.

== History ==
The club was promoted to the Namibia Premier League in 2016, however this season was cancelled due to conflicts between the clubs and the Namibia Premier League.

Young African won the 2017 Namibia Cup, defeating Mighty Gunners 3–2 in the final.

Young African played 8 games of the 2018/19 season before being expelled as they "registered a player with false identification details as well as contravened rule 52.4 of the NPL Football Manual on Rules and Regulation for corrupt, dishonest or unlawful practice" upon appeal to the Namibia Football Association the club was reinstated to the Premier league but had to pay a N$100,000 fine

== League results ==
Season	League	Place
2013–14	Cattle Country Football league	1st
2014–15	Southern First Division league	?
2015–16	Southern First Division league	1st
2016–17	Namibia Premier League	Cancelled
2017–18	Namibia Premier League	5th
2018–19	Namibia Premier League	Expelled
2019–20	No League	
2020–21	No League	
2021–22	No League	
2022–23	Namibia Premier Football League	9th
2023–24	Namibia Premiership	10th
2024–25	Namibia Premiership	2nd

== Achievements ==
- Namibian Cup:
- 2017: Winner
- Standard Bank Cup
- Dr Hage Geingob Cup

== Performance in CAF competitions ==
=== Matches ===
Season	Competition	Round	Opponent	Home	Away	Aggregate
2025-26	CAF Confederation Cup	1	(Eswatini) Royal Leopards	0 – 2	0 – 2	0 – 7
