= Namibia Correctional Service FC =

Namibian football club

- Nickname: NCS FC
- Ground: Mariental Stadium
- Capacity: 500
- League: Namibia Premiership

Namibia Correctional Service FC (NCS FC) is a Namibian football club based in Mariental which currently plays in the Namibia Premiership. It is the football side of the sports club representing the Namibia Correctional Service.

== History ==
Namibia Correctional Service FC won First Division Southern Stream for the 2023/2024 season, earning promotion to the Namibia Premiership for the first time. En route to promote, the club won eighteen of its twenty-two matches that season.

In 2024 their participation in the Premier League was blocked because another club with the same owners (Khomas Nampol) were already in the league. NCS appealed in court but it was unsuccessful.

== Honours ==
- First Division Southern Stream

Winners: 2023/2024
