= Richard Gariseb =

Namibian footballer (born 1980)

Personal information
- Full name: Richard Gariseb
- Date of birth: 3 February 1980 (age 46)
- Place of birth: Okahandja, Namibia
- Height: 1.80 m (5 ft 11 in)
- Position: Central defender

Team information
- Current team: Bidvest Wits
- Number: 5

Senior career*
Years	Team	Apps	(Gls)
1999–2005	Orlando Pirates Windhoek	?	(?)
2005–2007	Bidvest Wits	46	(2)
2007–2012	Orlando Pirates Windhoek	?	(?)
2012–	Bhawanipore F.C.		

International career^{‡}
2001–2011	Namibia	53	(5)
- * Club domestic league appearances and goals as of 13 April 2009 ‡ National team caps and goals as of 1 January 2012

Richard Gariseb (born 3 February 1980 in Okahandja) is a Namibian football defender. He plays for Bhawanipore F.C. and Namibia national football team.

He was a participant at the 2008 African Cup of Nations.
