= Oshakati City F.C. =

Namibian football club

Oshakati City
- Full name: Oshakati City Football Club
- Nickname: Ekondobolo Lanangombe
- Founded: 1966
- Ground: Embandu Stadium, Oshakati, Namibia
- Capacity: 1,000
- Chairman: Benjamen Hauwanga
- Manager: Petrus S Hauwanga
- League: Namibia First Division
Home colours	Away colours

The Oshakati City, also known as FNB Oshakati City due to sponsorship reasons, is a Namibian football (soccer) club from Oshakati. They play in the country's second division, the Namibia First Division. Oshakati is based in Oshakati city in the northern part of the country. It was there for named after the original town, Oshakati, and most of the players are based in that town. The club has a huge sponsorship backing by First National Bank of Namibia and a local business tycoon, Benjamen (Kagau-B.H) Hauwanga, the owner of the BH Group of Companies operating in Namibia and Angola. The club colors are red and white.

The team has been relegated Namibia Premier League in season 2010/2011.
