= Football in Namibia =

- Country: Namibia
- Governing body: Namibia Football Association
- National team: men's national team

National competitions
- NFA Cup

Club competitions
- Namibia Premiership

International competitions
- Champions League; CAF Confederation Cup; Super Cup; FIFA Club World Cup; FIFA World Cup (National Team); African Cup of Nations (National Team)

Football in Namibia is governed by the Namibia Football Association. The Namibia Premier Football League is the main domestic league. The Namibia national football team has never qualified for the FIFA World Cup, but has twice been runner up in the COSAFA Cup. They qualified for two Africa Cups of Nations, in 1998 and 2008, being eliminated in the first round both times. Association football is the most popular sport in Namibia, followed by rugby union.

== 2008 Africa Cup of Nations ==
In September 2007, the national team qualified for just their second ever African Cup of Nations appearance, which took place in Ghana. The Namibian squad was defeated 5–1 by Morocco in their first game, 0–1 by host Ghana in their 2nd and tied Guinea one all and thus did not earn a spot in the quarterfinal round.

== Notable Namibian footballers ==
- Collin Benjamin
- Henrico Botes
- Floris Diergaardt
- Richard Gariseb
- George Hummel
- Laurence Kaapama
- Rudi Louw
- Robert Nauseb
- Jamuovandu Ngatjizeko
- Ryan Nyambe
- Sydney Plaatjies
- Paulus Shipanga
- Razundara Tjikuzu

== Football stadiums in Namibia ==
#	Stadium	Capacity	City	Club	Image
1	Independence Stadium	25,000	Windhoek	Namibia national football team	
2	Sam Nujoma Stadium	10,300	Windhoek		

== Attendances ==
The average attendance per top-flight football league season and the club with the highest average attendance:

Season	League average	Best club	Best club average
2023-24	871	African Stars	4,467

Source: League page on Wikipedia

== See also ==
- Sport in Namibia
- Lists of stadiums
