= Mokati Stadium =

Stadium in Otjiwarongo, Namibia

Coordinates: 20°27′31″S 16°39′31″E

Mokati Stadium is a stadium in Otjiwarongo, Namibia. It is the home stadium of Mighty Gunners and Life Fighters, who play in the Namibia Premier League.

Mokati is situated in the suburb of Orwetoveni.
