= Oshakati Independence Stadium =

Football stadium in Oshakati, Oshana, Namibia

Coordinates: 17°47′15″S 15°41′32″E

Oshakati Independence Stadium is a football stadium in Oshakati, Oshana Region, Namibia. Home to Oshakati City F.C. formerly of the Namibia Premier League, Oshakati Independence Stadium can seat 8,000 spectators. It was built over seven years at a cost of 20 million Namibian dollars, but needed N$55,000 worth of repairs just a year later. In February 2008, two people died at the stadium during intense flooding across northern Namibia.
