= Rundu Chiefs =

Namibian football club

- Full name: Rundu Chiefs Football Club
- Nickname: Epangero (meaning The Government)
- Founded: 1976; 50 years ago
- Ground: Rundu Sports Stadium, Rundu
- Capacity: 500
- Chairman: Agripa Kamho Haindongo
- League: Namibia Premiership
- 2025–26: 16th (relegated)
Home colours

Rundu Chiefs FC is a Namibian football club from Rundu. They played in the country's highest division, the Namibia Premiership until the club's relegation in the 2025–26 season.

The team was founded on 25 June 1976.

== League participations ==
- Namibia Premier League: 2012/2013; 2017/2018
- Namibia First Division: 2010/2011; 2011/2012; 2014–15

== Stadium ==
Currently the team plays at the 500 capacity Rundu Sports Stadium.
