= Young Brazilians FC =

Namibian football club

- Full name: Young African Football Club
- Nickname: Dakaza Boys
- Founded: 2005
- Ground: J. Stephanus Stadium, Keetmanshoop
- Capacity: 1,000
- League: Namibia Premiership
- 2024–25: 14th
Home colours	Away colours

Young Brazilians is a Namibian football club based in Karasburg, Namibia.

== History ==
In the 2017/18, they were promoted from the Namibia First Division with a 3 to 1 win against Blue Boys from Swakopmund.

The club was promoted to the Namibia Premier League, the top division of Namibian football, for the first time in the 2018/19 season. It was the first team from the ǁKaras region to play in Namibia's top flight for eleven years. Home games had to be played at the J. Stephanus Stadium in Keetmanshoop, as the home Karasburg Combined School Stadium is gravel and does not meet the leagues requirements for grass.

== Performance ==
Season	League	Place
2013–14	Southern Stream	Below 3rd
2014–15	Southern Stream	Mid-table
2015–16	?	
2016–17	?	Cancelled
2017–18	Southern Stream First Division	Promoted via playoff
2018–19	Namibia Premier League	13th
2019–20	No League	
2020–21	No League	
2021–22	No League	
2022–23	Namibia Premier Football League	Ongoing

== Achievements ==
- Namibian Cup:
- Standard Bank Cup
- Dr Hage Geingob Cup
