= United Stars F.C. =

Namibian football club

United Stars Football Club
- Founded: 2016
- Ground: 8
- League: Namibia Premier League
- 2014–15: 1st
Home colours	Away colours

United Stars Football Club is an association football team in Rundu, Namibia. They played in the Namibia Premier League from 2009 to 2010.
