= Khomas NAMPOL FC =

Namibian football club

- Ground: UNAM Stadium
- Capacity: 3,000
- Manager: Fortune Eichab
- League: Namibia Premiership
- 2025–26: 13th

Khomas NAMPOL FC is a Namibian football club based in Windhoek which currently plays in the Namibia Premiership. The club is affiliated with the Namibian Police Force (NAMPOL).

== History ==
Khomas NAMPOL FC was founded in 2014. The club won the First Division Southern Stream in 2023 to earn promotion to the Namibia Premiership for the first time. Ahead of their first top-flight campaign, the club won a pre-season tournament which featured four other Premiership clubs and Matebele FC of the Botswana Premier League.

Khomas NAMPOL began their first season in the top flight with five wins in its first five matches to top the league table at that point. The roster included Namibia internationals such as Terdius Uiseb and Absalom Iimbondi. The club continued its strong performances and remained in the title race throughout the season. The club ultimately won the bronze medal that season as NAMPOL players Rewaldo Prins and George Frans finished second and third in the league scoring race, respectively.

== Honours ==
- Namibia Premiership

Bronze: 2023–24

- First Division Southern Stream

Winners: 2023
