= Namibia Premiership =

Top Namibian football division

- Organising body: Namibia Football Association
- Founded: 2020
- First season: 2022–23
- Country: Namibia
- Confederation: CAF
- Number of clubs: 16
- Level on pyramid: 1
- Relegation to: First Division
- Domestic cup: Namibia FA Cup
- International cup(s): CAF Champions League; CAF Confederation Cup
- Current champions: African Stars (3rd title)
- Most championships: African Stars (3)
- Current: 2025–26 Namibia Premiership

The Namibia Premiership, or the NAMPORT Namibia Premiership for sponsorship reasons, is the highest level of domestic association football in Namibia. It operates under the auspices of the Namibia Football Association.

== History ==
After ongoing financial and organizational problems with the Namibia Premier League (NPL), the Namibia Football Association expelled the league and founded a new top-flight league themselves following the 2018–19 season.

Despite a planned debut season in 2021, the league finally played its first season in 2022-23 after securing major sponsorship funding. Originally called the Namibia Premier Football League, the league was renamed the Namibia Premiership with the significant sponsorship of N$13 million provided by Debmarine.

Following the 2023–24 season, the Namibia Football Association addressed the long-time issue of clubs with shared ownership competing in the same league. Beginning with the 2024–25 season, the practice would no longer be allowed. The debate had begun a season earlier with Mighty Gunners and Military School Okahandja, both operated by the Namibian Defence Force, set to compete in the Premiership. The issue was solved with the sale and rebranding of the club to Okahandja United. The issue arose again in summer 2024 when Khomas NAMPOL and Namibia Correctional Service were set to compete in the top-flight. Because of the new policy, Namibian Correctional Service FC were not promoted and were replaced by First Division South runners-up Blue Boys.

== Clubs ==
NPFL teams 2024/25

2024–2025 Namibia Premiership
| Team | Location | Stadium | Capacity |
|---|---|---|---|
| African Stars | Katutura | Sam Nujoma Stadium | 10,300 |
| Blue Boys | Swakopmund | Mondesa Stadium | 2,000 |
| Blue Waters | Walvis Bay | Kuisebmund Stadium | 4,000 |
| Bucks Buccaneers | Khomasdal | Khomasdal Stadium | 2,000 |
| Eeshoke Chula Chula | Oshikango | Oshakati Independence Stadium | 8,000 |
| Cuca Tops | Rundu | Rundu Sports Stadium | 500 |
| Julinho Sporting | Rundu | Rundu Sports Stadium | 500 |
| Khomas NAMPOL | Windhoek | UNAM Stadium | 3,000 |
| KK Palace | Ondangwa | Oshakati Independence Stadium | 8,000 |
| Mighty Gunners | Otjiwarongo | Mokati Stadium | 1,000 |
| Okahandja United | Okahandja | Nau-AIB Stadium | 1,000 |
| Ongos SC | Windhoek | Sam Nujoma Stadium | 10,300 |
| United Africa Tigers | Windhoek | Sam Nujoma Stadium | 10,300 |
| UNAM | Windhoek | UNAM Stadium | 3,000 |
| Young Africans | Gobabis | Legare Stadium | 5,000 |
| Young Brazilians | Karasburg | Karasburg Stadium | 1,000 |

== Champions ==
| Season | Champion | Runners-up | Top Scorer(s) | Club | Goals |
|---|---|---|---|---|---|
| 2022–23 | African Stars | Blue Waters | (Namibia) Willy Stephanus | African Stars | 20 |
| 2023–24 | African Stars | Ongos Valley | (Namibia) Willy Stephanus (Namibia) Rewaldo Prins | African Stars; Khomas NAMPOL | 16 |
| 2024–25 | African Stars | Young African | (Namibia) Mbakondja Tjahikina | African Stars | 15 |
| 2025–26 | African Stars | Eeshoke Chula Chula | (Namibia) Mashiku Muyeka | Mighty Gunners | 18 |

== International competition ==
Below is a list of results in international competitions by clubs from the Namibia Premiership.

=== CAF Champions League ===
| Year | Club | Competition | Round | Opponent | Home | Away | Agg. | Notes |
|---|---|---|---|---|---|---|---|---|
| 2023–24 | African Stars | CAF Champions League | First Qualifying Round | (Zambia) Power Dynamos | 2–1 | 0–1 | 2–2 | lost on away goals |
| 2024–25 | African Stars | CAF Champions League | First Qualifying Round | (Botswana) Jwaneng Galaxy | 1–0 | 0–1 | 1–1 | lost 5–6 on penalties |
| 2025–26 | African Stars | CAF Champions League | First Qualifying Round | (Uganda) Vipers | 0–1 | 0–1 | 0–2 | |
| 2026–27 | African Stars | CAF Champions League | First Qualifying Round | (Gabon) AS Mangasport | 2–0 | 1–3 | 3–3 | advances on away goals |
| 2026–27 | African Stars | CAF Champions League | Second Qualifying Round | (South Africa) Orlando Pirates | 0–1 | 0–4 | 0–5 | |

=== CAF Confederation Cup ===
| Year | Club | Competition | Round | Opponent | Home | Away | Agg. | Notes |
|---|---|---|---|---|---|---|---|---|
| 2025–26 | Young African | CAF Confederation Cup | First Qualifying Round | (Eswatini) Royal Leopards | 0–2 | 0–5 | 0–7 | |
| 2026–27 | UNAM | CAF Confederation Cup | First Qualifying Round | (Angola) Kabuscorp | 0–2 | 1–3 | 1–5 | |
