= Citizens FC =

Templatonian football club

- Full name: Citizens Football Club
- Founded: 2013
- Ground: Sam Nujoma Stadium, Windhoek,
- Capacity: 10,300
- League: Namibia Premiership
Home colours	Away colours

Citizens FC is a football club located in Windhoek, Namibia.

== History ==
The predecessor of Citizens was a football club that was founded in 2012 under the name Monitoring Success College FC.

Citizens Football Club was founded on September 27, 2013, in the capital of Namibia, in the city of Windhoek. In 2014, the club reached the final of the National Cup

== Performance ==
Season	League	Place
2023/24	First Division Southern	
2022/23	Namibia Premier Football League	16th
2021/22	No League	
2020/21	No League	
2019/20	No League	
2018/19	Namibia Premier League	7th
2017/18	Namibia Premier League	11th
2016/17	Namibia Premier League	Cancelled
2015/16	Namibia Premier League	13th
2014/15	Namibia Premier league	9th
2013/14	First Division Southern	1st
2012/13	First Division Southern	7th
