= Namibia Football Association =

Governing body of association football in Namibia

CAF
- Short name: NFA
- Founded: 1990
- FIFA affiliation: 1992
- CAF affiliation: 1990 (Associate member); 1992
- Website: nfa.org.na

The Namibia Football Association (NFA) is the governing body of football in Namibia. The South West Africa Football Association had organized multiracial football since 1976. In 1990, it was reorganized as the Namibia Football Association, which later affiliated with FIFA and CAF in 1992. It organizes the national football league and the national team. Its aim is to create a football culture and industry that provides entertainment and economical benefits for all; to become a dominant national association within the confederation via the professionalism of the game's administration; to promote education and development programmes in all aspects of the sport.

On 22 July 2020, the NFA officially expelled the Namibia Premier League as a member and a 2 year absence of soccer comes from the disputes of these two bodies, and founded the Namibia Premier Football League in 2021.

== The Leagues ==
- Namibia FA Cup
- Namibia Premiership
- Namibia First Division
- Namibia Regional Second Division
- Namibia Women's Super League
