= UNAM F.C. =

Namibian football club

UNAM FC
- Full name: University of Namibia Football Club
- Nickname: Clever Boys
- Founded: 1990s; 35 years ago
- Ground: UNAM Stadium, Windhoek
- League: Namibia Premiership
- 2025–26: 7th
Home colours	Away colours

University of Namibia Football Club, commonly known as UNAM F.C., is a football club founded in the late 1990s by the University of Namibia from Windhoek in Namibia.

The team, as well as the women's football team (UNAM Bokkies), plays home games at the UNAM Stadium (Unam Sports Ground) in the southwest of Windhoek.

== History ==
Players were originally exclusively recruited from the University of Namibia through the Unam home league.

In the 2002–03 season, UNAM FC was promoted from the Namibia Second Division to the Namibia First Division.

In August 2014, the club acquired the right to start in the highest Namibian league, the Namibia Premier League, from Ramblers FC. Thus, in the 2014/15 season, UNAM FC competed in the first division for the first time.

On 2 October 2014, Grand Master Printing owed by former UNAM student and businessman Eliaser Ndimulunde took over the vacant position of shirt sponsor for N$60,000 per season.

In February 2023, the club announced that MUMI would become the main shirt sponsor in a 3-year deal of N$30,000 per year.

== Performance ==
Season	League	Place
2022/23	Namibia Premier Football League	5th
2021/22	No League	
2020/21	No League	
2019/20	No League	
2018/19	Namibia Premier League	4th
2017/18	Namibia Premier League	4th
2016/17	Namibia Premier League	Cancelled
2015/16	Namibia Premier League	10th
2014/15	Franchise place bought from Ramblers FC	
2013/14	Southern Stream	3rd
2012/13	Southern Stream	6th
2011/12	No Information	
2010/11	Southern Stream	8th
2009/10	Southern Stream	2nd
2008/09	Southern Stream First Division - Coastal Stream	4th
2007/08	MTC Khomas Region Division Two	1st
2006/07	No Information	
2005/06	Khomas Football Region	?
2004/05	Central West First Division	2nd
2003/04	Khomas Second Division	1st
2002/03	Khomas Second Division	?

== Achievements ==
- Namibian Cup:

2018 - 2nd

- Standard Bank Cup
- Dr Hage Geingob Cup
