= Blue Boys FC =

Namibian football club

Blue Boys
- Full name: Blue Boys Football Club
- Founded: 1958
- Ground: Mondesa Stadium, Swakopmund
- Capacity: 2,000
- League: Namibia First Division
- 2024-25 Namibia Premiership: Namibia Premiership 15th (relegated)

Blue Boys FC is a Namibian association football club from Swakopmund. Founded in 1958, the team currently plays in the Namibia Premiership.

== Stadium ==
Currently, the team plays at the 2000-seat Mondesa Stadium.
