= Julinho Sporting F.C. =

Namibian football club

- Full name: Julinho Football Club
- Nickname: Rundu Lions
- Founded: 2002
- Ground: Rundu Sports Stadium, Rundu
- Capacity: 500
- Owner(s): Nelson and Norton Luis
- Chairman: Joao Paulo Dos Santos
- Manager: Nelson Luis
- League: Namibia Premiership
- 2025–26: 9th
- Website: https://www.facebook.com/julinnhoSportingFC
Home colours

Julinho Sporting F.C. (also known as the Rundu Lions) is a Namibian football club competing in the Namibia Premier League. The team is based in Rundu in the Kavango East region. The team earned a promotion to the 2014–15 Namibia Premier League after winning the 2013–14 North East First Division title. In their first season in the Premier League, the team placed 13th.

== History ==
Julinho Sporting F.C. was founded in 2002 by brothers Nelson and Norton Luis in Rundu. They named the team after their late father, Julio Luis. The three had previously been involved with a community football club called Cola-Cola Sporting. The club spent nine years in Namibia's Second Division and was originally composed of players from the Maria Mwengere Secondary School. Julinho Sporting won a promotion to the First Division for the 2011–12 season.

Julinho Sporting F.C. won the North East First Division in the 2013–14 season after a 2–0 win against Bingo F.C. The victory earned the club a spot in the 2014–15 Namibia Premier League. In their first season, the club earned 9 wins, 5 draws, and 16 losses for a total of 32 points. They finished in 13th place, avoiding relegation by a single point. In the summer of 2015, the club earned a spot in the Dr. Hage Geingob Cup in Windhoek. The club garnered over 30,000 votes in a public voting competition to become the 4th and final entrant into the tournament. Other clubs in the tournament included Namibia's African Stars F.C., South Africa's Mamelodi Sundowns F.C., and Angola's C.D. Primeiro de Agosto. Julinho Sporting lost to African Stars 5–4 on penalties after a 1–1 draw. They would eventually lose the third-place game 1–0 against Primeiro de Agosto.

The team earned their first victory of the season against Flamingo F.C. 1–0 on 20 September.

== Achievements ==
- Namibia Second Division: 1
  - 2012
- Namibia First Division: 1
  - 2014 (Promotion to Namibia Premier League)
