= Ongos SC =

Association football club in Namibia

- Full name: Ongos Sports Club
- Founded: 2005; 21 years ago
- Ground: Sam Nujoma Stadium, Windhoek
- Capacity: 10,300
- Chairman: Peter Nakarua
- Manager: Paulus Shipanga
- League: Namibia Premiership
- 2025–26: 4th
Home colours	Away colours

Ongos Valley FC is a Namibian football club based in Windhoek. It competes in the Namibia Premier Football League.

== History ==
Ongos SC was founded as Tura Magic Sports Club. In summer 2023 the club was purchased and renamed Ongos FC after the Ongos Valley. At that time, former Brave Warriors coach Ricardo Mannetti was named Sporting Director.
