= Namibia national football team =

National association football team

Namibia
- Nickname: Brave Warriors
- Association: Namibia Football Association (NFA)
- Confederation: CAF (Africa)
- Sub-confederation: COSAFA (Southern Africa)
- Head coach: Collin Benjamin
- Captain: Peter Shalulile
- Most caps: Deon Hotto (90)
- Top scorer: Peter Shalulile (22)
- Home stadium: Independence Stadium
- FIFA code: NAM
First colours	Second colours	Third colours

FIFA ranking
- Current: 123 ▼2 (7 October 2026)
- Highest: 68 (November 1998)
- Lowest: 167 (July 2006)

First international
- (South Africa) South-West Africa 0–1 Angola (Namibia; 16 May 1989)

Biggest win
- Namibia 6–0 Botswana (Windhoek, Namibia; 25 August 1996); Namibia 8–2 Benin (Windhoek, Namibia; 15 July 2000)

Biggest defeat
- Egypt 7–1 Namibia (Cairo, Egypt; 8 November 1996); Egypt 8–2 Namibia (Alexandria, Egypt; 13 July 2001); Russia 6–0 Namibia ( Yekaterinburg, Russia; 3 October 2026)

Africa Cup of Nations
- Appearances: 4 (first in 1998)
- Best result: Round of 16 (2023)

African Nations Championship
- Appearances: 2 (first in 2018)
- Best result: Quarter-finals (2018)

COSAFA Cup
- Appearances: 19 (first in 1997)
- Best result: Champions (2015)
Medal record
COSAFA Cup
Gold medal – first place	2015 South Africa	Team
Silver medal – second place	1997 Southern Africa	Team
Silver medal – second place	1999 Southern Africa	Team
Silver medal – second place	2022 South Africa	Team
Silver medal – second place	2024 South Africa	Team

The Namibia national football team represents Namibia in men's international football and is controlled by the Namibia Football Association. They have never qualified for the FIFA World Cup but have made four appearances in the Africa Cup of Nations. The team represents both FIFA and Confederation of African Football (CAF).

== History ==
Namibia played its first international under the name South-West Africa on 16 May 1989 at home against neighbouring Angola and lost 1–0. On 23 March 1990, only two days after gaining independence from South Africa, they hosted neighbour Zimbabwe and lost 5–1. On 7 June, they lost a home friendly 2–1 to Mauritius. Namibia's next contests were played in Lesotho, where they lost 2–0 to their hosts on 1 August 1992, but gained their first ever draw in a 2–2 tie against the same opposition the very next day. Namibia's first win came on 1 July 1994 in a 1–0 victory away over Botswana in a friendly. On 17 May 1998, Namibia played their first match outside of Africa and against non-African opposition, losing 2–1 in a friendly in France against Saudi Arabia.

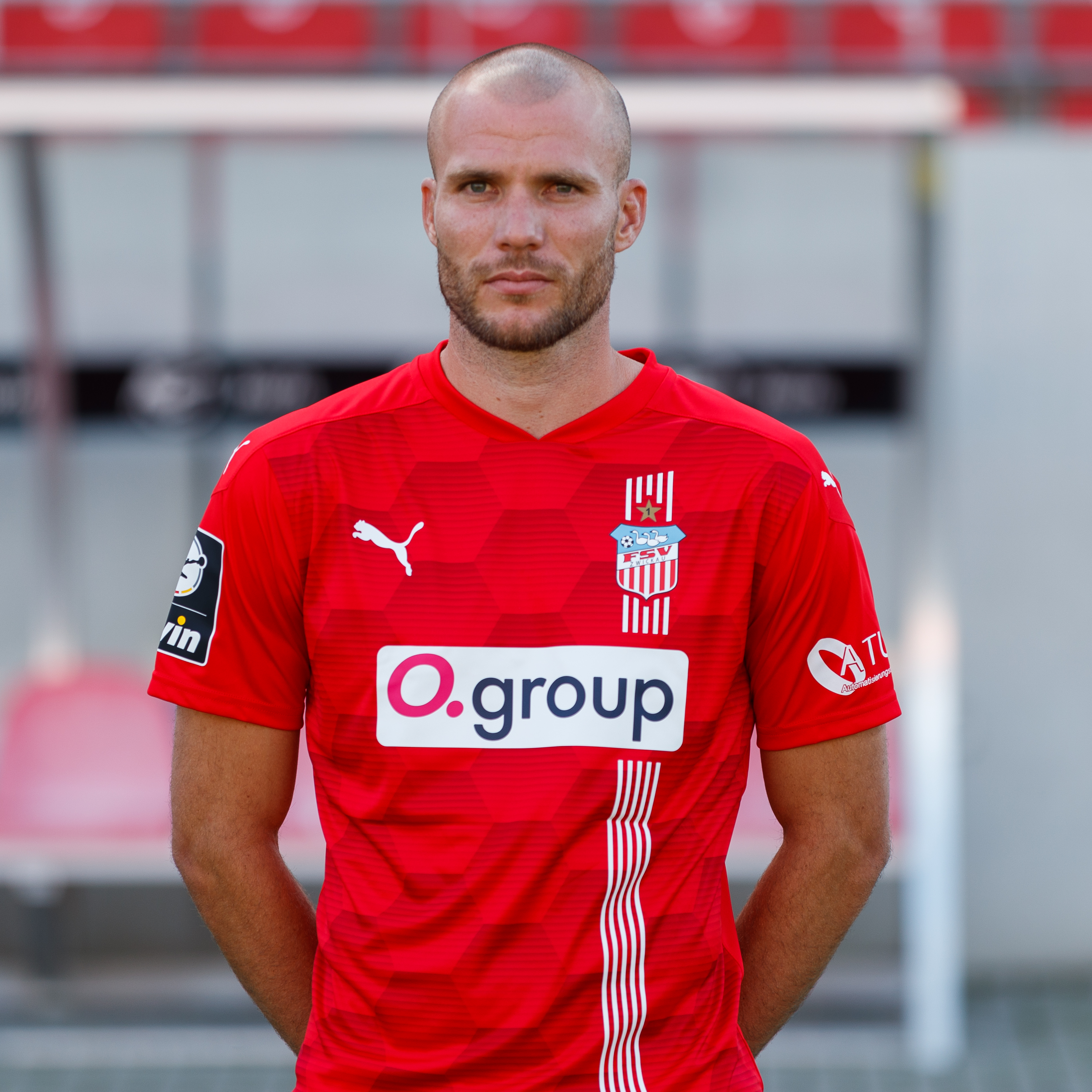
Manfred Starke made his debut for Namibia in 2012

Namibia has made four appearances in the African Cup of Nations, going out in the first round in their first three competitions and going out in the Round of 16 in their fourth competition. In 1998, Namibia lost to Ivory Coast 4–3 and drew Angola 3–3 before losing to South Africa 4–1. In 2008, Namibia lost to Morocco 5–1 and to Ghana 1–0 but drew Guinea 1–1 in their last match. In 2019, they lost all their group matches, scoring only a single goal. They lost to Morocco 1–0, and suffered the same loss to South Africa before losing to Ivory Coast 4–1.

Namibia reached the Round of 16 for the first time in the 2023 Africa Cup of Nations, where they lost 3–0 against Angola.

== Results and fixtures ==
The following is a list of match results in the last 12 months, as well as any future matches that have been scheduled.

Win Draw Loss Fixture

=== 2025 ===
14 November Friendly	Comoros	1–0	Namibia	Moroni, Comoros
	Abdallah 84'	Report		Stadium: Stade Omnisports de Malouzini

17 November Friendly	Comoros	4–0	Namibia	Moroni, Comoros
19:00 UTC+3	M'Changama 4'; Youssouf 22'; Ahmed 69'; Ben Nabouhane 77'	Report		Stadium: Stade omnisports de Malouzini

=== 2026 ===
25 March 2026 FIFA Series	Kuwait	Cancelled	Namibia	Astana, Kazakhstan
20:00 UTC+5				Stadium: Astana Arena
Note: Match cancelled due to Kuwait withdrawing following the 2026 Iran war.

25 March 2026 FIFA Series	Kazakhstan	2–0	Namibia	Astana, Kazakhstan
17:00 UTC+5	Vorogovsky 12'; Kasym 79'	Report		Stadium: Astana Arena; Referee: Viktar Shymusik (Belarus)

28 March 2026 FIFA Series	Namibia	0–0 (5–4 p)	Comoros	Astana, Kazakhstan
17:00 UTC+5		Report		Stadium: Astana Arena; Referee: Arman Ismuratov (Kazakhstan)
	Penalties
	Hanamub (penalty scored); Muzeu (penalty scored); Petrus (penalty scored); Rudath (penalty scored); Kambato (penalty scored)		(penalty scored) Kari; (penalty scored) Id. Mohamed; (penalty missed) Ali; (penalty scored) Abdallah; (penalty scored) Mroivili

24 September 2026 2027 AFCON qualification	Namibia	1-0	Congo	Gaborone, Botswana
15:00 UTC+0	Muzeu 47'			Stadium: Botswana National Stadium; Referee: Mahrez Melki (Tunisia)

29 September 2026 2027 AFCON qualification	Comoros	1-0	Namibia	Moroni, Comoros
13:00 UTC+0	Youssouf 54'			Stadium: Stade Omnisports de Malouzini, Comoros

3 October Friendly	Russia	6-0	Namibia	Yekaterinburg, Russia
--:-- UTC+3	Sadulaev 37' Prutsev 54' Tyukaniv 65' Glushenkov 84' Petrov 87' (pen.) Ndisiro 90+2' (o.g.)			Stadium: Yekaterinburg Arena; Attendance: 32,000; Referee: Abdurashid Khudoyberganov (Uzbekistan)

11 November 2027 AFCON qualification	Cameroon	v	Namibia	TBD, Cameroon
TBD				Stadium: TBD

15 November 2027 AFCON qualification	Namibia	v	Cameroon	TBD, Namibia
TBD				Stadium: TBD

=== 2027 ===
24 March 2027 AFCON qualification	Congo	v	Namibia	TBD, Congo
TBD				Stadium: TBD

28 March 2027 AFCON qualification	Namibia	v	Comoros	TBD, Namibia
TBD				Stadium: TBD

== Coaching history ==
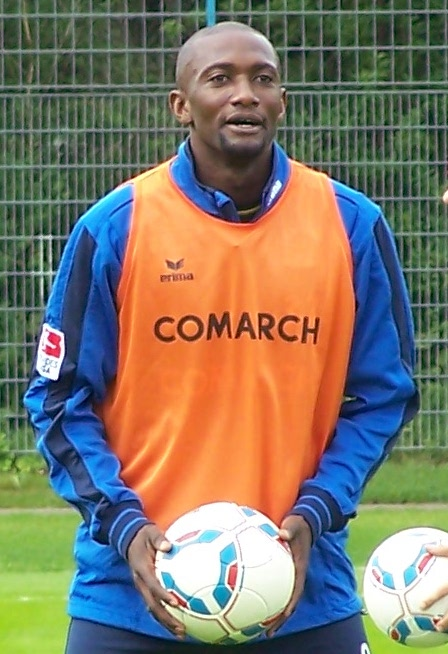
Collin Benjamin became the manager of the national football team of Namibia in 2022

Caretaker managers are listed in italics.

- (Namibia) Eric Muinjo (1992–1993)
- (Zimbabwe) Shepherd Murape (1994–1995)
- (Namibia) Ruston Mogane (1997–1998)
- (Namibia) Mlungisi Ngubane (1998)
- (Namibia) Seth Boois (1998–1999)
- (Germany) Heinz-Peter Überjahn (1999)
- (Namibia) Herman Katjiuongua (2000)
- (Namibia) Lucky Richter (2000)
- (Romania) Ted Dumitru (2000–2003)
- (Zimbabwe) Shepherd Murape (2004)
- (Zambia) Ben Bamfuchile (2006–2007)
- (Netherlands) Arie Schans (2007–2008)
- (Belgium) Tom Saintfiet (2008–2010)
- (Namibia) Brian Isaacs (2010–2011)
- (Namibia) Bernard Kaanjuka (2011–2013)
- (Sweden) Roger Palmgren (2013)
- (Namibia) Ricardo Mannetti (2013–2015)
- (Namibia) Fillemon Kanalelo (2015)
- (Namibia) Ricardo Mannetti (2015–2019)
- (Namibia) Bobby Samaria (2019–2021)
- (Namibia) Collin Benjamin (2022–present)

== Players ==
=== Current squad ===
The following players were called up to the squad for the 2027 Africa Cup of Nations qualification matches against Congo and Comoros on 24 and 29 September 2026, respectively and the friendly match against Russia on 3 October 2026.

Caps and goals correct as of 28 March 2026, after the match against Comoros.

No.	Pos.	Player	Date of birth (age)	Caps	Goals	Club
	GK	Ndisiro Kamaijanda	1 December 1999 (age 26)	19	0	(South African Football Association) Highbury
	GK	Jonas Mateus	10 February 1996 (age 30)	0	0	(Namibia Football Association) Ongos Valley
	GK	Mervin Kasetura	26 December 1997 (age 28)	0	0	(Namibia Football Association) African Stars
	DF	Riaan Hanamub	8 February 1995 (age 31)	60	0	(South African Football Association) AmaZulu
	DF	Charles Hambira	3 June 1990 (age 36)	59	3	(Namibia Football Association) African Stars
	DF	Ivan Kamberipa	3 February 1994 (age 32)	53	2	(Botswana Football Association) Gaborone United
	DF	Ngero Katua	25 July 2001 (age 25)	30	0	(South African Football Association) Highbury
	DF	Paulus Amutenya	22 July 2002 (age 24)	24	0	(Botswana Football Association) Gaborone United
	DF	Sergio Damaseb	13 February 2000 (age 26)	11	0	(Zimbabwe Football Association) Simba Bhora
	DF	Tyrese Hikupembe	6 May 2000 (age 26)	5	0	(Zimbabwe Football Association) Chicken Inn
	DF	Kennedy Eib	15 May 1997 (age 29)	5	0	(Zimbabwe Football Association) Simba Bhora
	DF	Okeri Nguarambuka		0	0	(Namibia Football Association) African Stars
	MF	Deon Hotto	29 October 1990 (age 36)	86	12	(South African Football Association) Orlando Pirates
	MF	Aprocius Petrus	9 October 1999 (age 27)	55	0	(Sudan Football Association) Al Hilal
	MF	Wendell Rudath	7 October 1995 (age 31)	16	2	(Namibia Football Association) Bucks Buccaneers
	MF	Moses Shidolo	20 May 1998 (age 28)	15	0	(Zimbabwe Football Association) Scottland
	MF	Tjipe Karuuombe	21 September 2001 (age 25)	14	1	(Georgian Football Federation) Gonio
	MF	Ben Richard Namib	20 August 1999 (age 27)	7	0	(Namibia Football Association) Khomas NAMPOL
	MF	Stoffel Witbeen	16 March 2002 (age 24)	0	0	(Zimbabwe Football Association) Scottland
	MF	Nestor Iyambo		0	0	(Namibia Football Association) UNAM
	FW	Peter Shalulile	23 March 1993 (age 33)	67	22	(Tanzania Football Federation) Young Africans
	FW	Bethuel Muzeu	22 February 2000 (age 26)	38	5	(South African Football Association) Sekhukhune United
	FW	Junior Petrus	17 June 2000 (age 26)	4	0	(Zimbabwe Football Association) Simba Bhora
	FW	Mashiku Muyeka		2	0	(South African Football Association) Venda

=== Recent call-ups ===
The following players have been called up for Namibia in the last 12 months.

Pos.	Player	Date of birth (age)	Caps	Goals	Club	Latest call-up
GK	Vaitavera Tjatindi	14 March 2000 (age 26)	44	0	(Namibia) Young African	v. Comoros; 17 November 2025
GK	Edward Maova	5 September 1994 (age 32)	22	0	(South Africa) Lamontville Golden Arrows	v. Tunisia; 13 October 2025
DF	Alex Mumbango		0	0	(Zimbabwe) Chicken Inn	v. Congo; 24 September 2026 ^{PRE} ^{WD}
DF	David Tuhafeni	5 February 2001 (age 25)	1	0	(Namibia) Blue Waters	2026 FIFA Series
DF	Deacon Kakuenje	13 October 2003 (age 23)	0	0	(Namibia) Young African	2026 FIFA Series
DF	David Aingwafa		2	0	(Namibia) Eeshoke Chula Chula	2026 FIFA Series ^{PRE}
DF	Arend Abubakir	17 March 2002 (age 24)	0	0	(Namibia) Blue Waters	2026 FIFA Series ^{PRE}
DF	Simeon Ekandjo		0	0	(Namibia) UNAM	2026 FIFA Series ^{PRE}
DF	Mattias Ndaudako		0	0	(Namibia) Julinho Sporting	2026 FIFA Series ^{PRE}
DF	Josef Lumbu	22 February 1999 (age 27)	2	0	(Namibia) Okahandja United	v. Comoros; 17 November 2025
DF	Ngaitone Kaindjee		0	0	(Namibia) Young African	v. Comoros; 14 November 2025 ^{PRE}
DF	Kennedy Paulus		0	0		v. Comoros; 14 November 2025 ^{PRE}
DF	Sisqo Haraseb	10 March 2001 (age 25)	3	1	(Namibia) Mighty Gunners	v. Tunisia; 13 October 2025
MF	Prins Tjiueza	12 March 2002 (age 24)	22	2	(South Africa) Cape Town City	v. Congo; 24 September 2026 ^{PRE} ^{INJ}
MF	Tuli Nashixwa	23 May 2002 (age 24)	7	0	(South Africa) Richards Bay	v. Congo; 24 September 2026 ^{PRE} ^{INJ}
MF	Romeo Kasume	21 October 1997 (age 29)	12	0	(Kosovo) Liria Prizren	2026 FIFA Series
MF	Mbakondja Tjahikika	2 August 2000 (age 26)	5	0	(Zimbabwe) Platinum	2026 FIFA Series
MF	Uetuuru Kambato	24 January 1998 (age 28)	4	0	(Albania) Pogradeci	2026 FIFA Series
MF	Barnard Horaseb		2	0	(Namibia) Mighty Gunners	2026 FIFA Series
MF	Dwain Kinda		0	0	(Namibia) Ongos Valley	2026 FIFA Series
MF	Edmar Kamatuka	26 July 2002 (age 24)	9	0	(Namibia) African Stars	2026 FIFA Series ^{PRE}
MF	Simon Elago	7 October 2002 (age 24)	5	0	(Namibia) Ongos Valley	2026 FIFA Series ^{PRE}
MF	Elias Hambongo	29 May 1999 (age 27)	4	0	(Namibia) KK Palace	2026 FIFA Series ^{PRE}
MF	Lawrence Doeseb	6 April 2003 (age 23)	0	0	(Namibia) African Stars	2026 FIFA Series ^{PRE}
MF	Giovanni Engelbrecht		0	0	(Namibia) Bucks Buccaneers	2026 FIFA Series ^{PRE}
MF	Rikambura Muundjua		0	0	(Namibia) African Stars	2026 FIFA Series ^{PRE}
MF	Simon Nambondi		0	0	(Namibia) Mighty Gunners	2026 FIFA Series ^{PRE}
MF	Sam Ndahangwapo	24 September 2000 (age 26)	0	0	(Namibia) Blue Waters	2026 FIFA Series ^{PRE}
MF	Oscar Nyambe		0	0	(Namibia) Rundu Chiefs	2026 FIFA Series ^{PRE}
MF	Festus Petrus		0	0	(Namibia) Eeshoke Chula Chula	2026 FIFA Series ^{PRE}
MF	Victor Shimwetheleni		0	0	(Namibia) United Africa Tigers	2026 FIFA Series ^{PRE}
MF	Alfeus Leevi	18 January 2001 (age 25)	8	0	(Namibia) Blue Waters	v. Comoros; 17 November 2025
MF	Viera Kazongominja	23 October 2002 (age 24)	0	0	(Namibia) Young African	v. Comoros; 17 November 2025
MF	Vevangapi Mbuende	5 November 2005 (age 21)	0	0	(Namibia) African Stars	v. Comoros; 17 November 2025
MF	Romin Berndt	28 January 2002 (age 24)	0	0	Free agent	v. Comoros; 14 November 2025 ^{PRE}
MF	Willy Stephanus	26 June 1991 (age 35)	69	3	(Namibia) African Stars	v. Tunisia; 13 October 2025
MF	Dynamo Fredericks	4 April 1992 (age 34)	52	1	(Botswana) Jwaneng Galaxy	v. Tunisia; 13 October 2025
FW	David Ndeunyema	22 August 2002 (age 24)	5	0	(Zimbabwe) MWOS	v. Congo; 24 September 2026 ^{PRE} ^{INJ}
FW	Michael Jonas	17 June 2006 (age 20)	0	0	(Namibia) Eeshoke Chula Chula	v. Congo; 24 September 2026 ^{PRE}
FW	Johannes Shiyave		0	0	(Namibia) Eeshoke Chula Chula	v. Congo; 24 September 2026 ^{PRE}
FW	Wiseman Lifasi	23 April 2002 (age 24)	3	0	(Namibia) Eeshoke Chula Chula	2026 FIFA Series ^{PRE}
FW	George Marselino		0	0	(Namibia) Blue Waters	2026 FIFA Series ^{PRE}
FW	Chris Haoseb	27 October 2005 (age 21)	0	0	(Namibia) Okahandja United	v. Comoros; 17 November 2025
FW	Nicodemus Haikali		0	0	(Namibia) Ongos Valley	v. Comoros; 14 November 2025 ^{PRE}
FW	Erastus Kulula	27 February 1997 (age 29)	9	1	(Kosovo) Liria Prizren	v. Tunisia; 13 October 2025
^{DEC} Player refused to join the team after the call-up.^{INJ} Player withdrew from the squad due to an injury.^{PRE} Preliminary squad.^{RET} Player has retired from international football.^{SUS} Suspended from the national team.

=== Previous squads ===
Africa Cup of Nations squads

- 1998 African Cup of Nations squad
- 2008 Africa Cup of Nations squad
- 2019 Africa Cup of Nations squad
- 2023 Africa Cup of Nations squad

== Player records ==
As of 28 March 2026
Players in bold are still active with Namibia.

=== Most appearances ===
Rank	Player	Caps	Goals	Career
1	**Deon Hotto**	86	12	2013–present
2	Denzil Haoseb	85	0	2011–2024
3	Petrus Shitembi	81	4	2011–2024
4	Ronald Ketjijere	70	2	2010–2019
5	**Willy Stephanus**	69	3	2011–present
6	**Peter Shalulile**	67	22	2014–present
7	**Ananias Gebhardt**	66	2	2011–present
7	Johannes Hindjou	66	10	1996–2005
7	**Absalom Iimbondi**	66	7	2015–present
10	Larry Horaeb	62	0	2011–2021

=== Top goalscorers ===
Rank	Player	Goals	Caps	Ratio	Career
1	**Peter Shalulile**	22	67	0.33	2014–present
2	Rudolph Bester	13	46	0.28	2004–2014
3	**Deon Hotto**	12	86	0.14	2013–present
4	Gervatius Urikhob	11	45	0.24	1992–2003
5	Eliphas Shivute	10	42	0.24	1992–2001
5	Johannes Hindjou	10	66	0.15	1996–2005
7	**Elmo Kambindu**	9	31	0.29	2019–present
7	Benson Shilongo	9	36	0.25	2011–2021
9	Hendrik Somaeb	8	31	0.28	2011–2019
9	Ruben van Wyk	8	36	0.22	1994–2002

== Competitive record ==
=== FIFA World Cup ===
FIFA World Cup record									Qualification record					
Year	Round	Position	Pld	W	D*	L	GF	GA	Pld	W	D	L	GF	GA
1930 to 1990	Part of South Africa								Part of South Africa					
(United States) 1994	Did not qualify								4	0	0	4	0	12
(France) 1998	Did not qualify								8	2	2	4	9	18
(South Korea) (Japan) 2002	Did not qualify								10	1	3	6	7	27
(Germany) 2006	Did not qualify								2	0	1	1	1	4
(South Africa) 2010	Did not qualify								6	2	0	4	7	12
(Brazil) 2014	Did not qualify								8	3	2	3	10	4
(Russia) 2018	Did not qualify								4	1	1	2	3	5
(Qatar) 2022	Did not qualify								8	3	2	3	9	11
(Canada) (Mexico) (United States) 2026	Did not qualify								10	4	3	3	13	10
(Morocco) (Portugal) (Spain) 2030	To be determined								To be determined					
(Saudi Arabia) 2034	To be determined								To be determined					
Total	–	0/8	–	–	–	–	–	–	60	16	14	30	59	103

=== Africa Cup of Nations ===
Africa Cup of Nations record
Year	Round	Position	Pld	W	D*	L	GF	GA
(Sudan); 1957 to (Algeria); 1990	Part of South Africa							
(Senegal); 1992 to (Tunisia); 1994	Did not enter							
(South Africa) 1996	Did not qualify							
(Burkina Faso); 1998	Group stage	14	3	0	1	2	7	11
(Ghana) (Nigeria); 2000	Did not qualify							
(Mali); 2002	Did not qualify							
(Tunisia); 2004	Did not qualify							
(Egypt); 2006	Did not qualify							
(Ghana); 2008	Group stage	14	3	0	1	2	2	7
(Angola); 2010	Did not qualify							
(Equatorial Guinea) (Gabon); 2012	Did not qualify							
(South Africa); 2013	Did not qualify							
(Equatorial Guinea); 2015	Did not qualify							
(Gabon); 2017	Did not qualify							
(Egypt); 2019	Group stage	23rd	3	0	0	3	1	6
(Cameroon); 2021	Did not qualify							
(Ivory Coast); 2023	Round of 16	15th	4	1	1	2	1	7
(Morocco); 2025	Did not qualify							
(Kenya) (Tanzania) (Uganda); 2027	To be determined							
2029	To be determined							
Total	Round of 16	4/35	13	1	3	9	11	31

=== African Nations Championship ===
African Nations Championship record
Appearances: 2
Year	Round	Position	Pld	W	D*	L	GF	GA
(Ivory Coast) 2009	Did not qualify							
(Sudan) 2011	Did not qualify							
(South Africa) 2014	Did not qualify							
(Rwanda) 2016	Did not qualify							
(Morocco) 2018	Quarter-finals	7th	4	2	1	1	3	3
(Cameroon) 2020	Group stage	15th	3	0	1	2	0	4
(Algeria) 2022	Did not enter							
(Morocco) 2024	Did not qualify							
Total	Quarter-finals	2/7	7	2	2	3	3	7

== Head-to-head record against other nations ==
Updated on 3 October 2026 after match against Russia

Positive Record Neutral Record Negative Record

Opponent	Pld	W	D	L	GF	GA	GD
Algeria	4	0	0	4	0	7	−7
Angola	16	0	7	9	9	25	−16
Benin	2	1	0	1	8	4	+4
Botswana	20	2	11	7	18	19	−1
Burkina Faso	3	0	0	3	2	11	−9
Burundi	4	1	1	2	7	8	–1
Chad	4	3	0	1	7	4	+3
Cameroon	6	1	2	3	3	8	−5
Comoros	9	3	2	4	8	8	0
Congo	7	2	2	3	4	9	−5
Djibouti	2	2	0	0	4	0	+4
DR Congo	3	1	1	1	7	4	+3
Egypt	6	0	1	5	6	23	−17
Eritrea	2	2	0	0	4	1	+3
Ethiopia	2	2	0	0	4	2	+2
Equatorial Guinea	1	0	1	0	1	1	0
Gabon	2	0	2	0	2	2	0
Gambia	4	2	1	1	5	5	0
Ghana	3	0	1	2	0	2	−2
Guinea	10	1	2	7	4	19	−15
Guinea-Bissau	2	0	1	1	0	1	−1
India	1	0	0	1	0	2	−2
Ivory Coast	6	2	1	3	8	13	−5
Kazakhstan	1	0	0	1	0	2	−2
Kenya	8	4	1	3	6	5	+1
Lebanon	1	0	1	0	1	1	0
Lesotho	13	5	5	3	15	14	+1
Liberia	3	1	3	2	4	6	–2
Libya	2	1	0	1	2	2	0
Madagascar	8	4	1	3	11	10	+1
Malawi	18	9	4	5	23	18	+5
Mali	8	1	3	4	4	8	−4
Mauritius	4	2	0	2	5	4	+1
Morocco	7	0	1	6	2	15	−13
Mozambique	20	10	6	4	25	14	+11
Niger	3	1	0	2	2	3	−1
Nigeria	4	0	1	3	1	8	−7
Russia	1	0	0	1	0	6	−6
Rwanda	4	0	3	1	3	6	−3
São Tomé and Príncipe	2	2	0	0	5	0	+5
Saudi Arabia	2	0	0	2	1	3	−2
Senegal	8	1	0	7	5	24	−19
Seychelles	7	4	3	0	15	5	+10
South Africa	14	1	5	8	10	27	−17
Eswatini	9	1	4	4	8	10	−2
Tanzania	4	0	2	2	1	4	−3
Togo	2	1	0	1	1	1	0
Tunisia	7	2	1	4	3	11	−8
Zambia	22	2	11	9	11	27	−16
Zimbabwe	15	7	0	8	26	29	–3
Total	313	82	90	141	302	433	−131

== Honours ==
=== Regional ===
- COSAFA Cup
  - (gold) Champions (1): 2015
  - (silver) Runners-up (4): 1997, 1999, 2022, 2024
