= Namibia FA Cup =

- Founded: 1990
- Current champions: FC Civics
- 2024 Namibia FA Cup

The Namibia FA Cup (Namibia Football Association Cup), officially Bidvest Namibia Cup, is an association football tournament for Namibian clubs.

The competition was relaunched in 2024, following a number of years of inactivity due to the unavailability of a sponsor, after the Namibian Football Association agreed a one-year deal with PstBet.

== Previous Champions ==
- 1990: Black Africa F.C. (Windhoek)
- 1991: Chief Santos (Tsumeb)
- 1992: Liverpool (Okahandja)
- 1993: Black Africa F.C. (Windhoek)
- 1994: Blue Waters (Walvis Bay)
- 1995: Tigers (Windhoek)
- 1996: Tigers (Windhoek)
- 1997: not contested
- 1998: Chief Santos (Tsumeb)
- 1999: Chief Santos (Tsumeb)
- 2000: Chief Santos (Tsumeb)
- 2001: not contested
- 2002: Orlando Pirates (Windhoek)
- 2003: FC Civics (Windhoek)
- 2004: Black Africa F.C. (Windhoek)
- 2005: Ramblers (Windhoek)
- 2006: Orlando Pirates (Windhoek)
- 2007: African Stars (Windhoek)
- 2008: FC Civics (Windhoek)
- 2009: Orlando Pirates (Windhoek)
- 2010: African Stars (Windhoek)
- 2011: Eleven Arrows F.C. (Walvis Bay)
- 2012: not held
- 2013: African Stars (Windhoek)
- 2014: African Stars (Windhoek)
- 2015: Tigers (Windhoek)
- 2016: not held
- 2017: Young African F.C.
- 2018: African Stars (Windhoek)
- 2019: not held
- 2020: not held
- 2021: FC Civics (Windhoek)
- 2022: not held
- 2023: not held
- 2024: African Stars (Windhoek)

== Most titles ==
Club	Titles
African Stars	6
Chief Santos	4
Black Africa F.C.	3
FC Civics	3
Orlando Pirates	3
Tigers	3
Blue Waters	1
Eleven Arrows	1
Liverpool (Okahandja)	1
Ramblers	1
Young African F.C.	1

== See also ==
- Namibia Premiership
