= Blue Waters F.C. =

Namibian football club

Blue Waters
- Full name: Blue Waters Football Club
- Nicknames: Up the Birds, The Blue Birds, Omeva
- Founded: 1936; 90 years ago, as Blue Waters
- Stadium: Kuisebmund Stadium, Walvis Bay
- Capacity: 4,000
- Chairman: Hafeni Ndemula
- Coach: Ruben Pinto Jimeno
- League: Namibia Premiership
- 2025–26: 6th

Blue Waters Football Club, previously also known as Langer Heinrich Mine (LHU) Blue Waters due to sponsorship reasons, is a professional Namibian football club from Walvis Bay. The team is nicknamed Blue Birds, The Birds or Omeva (which means 'water' in the local OshiWambo language). The team trains at its current field, Blue Waters Sport Field in Kuisebmund, a suburb of Walvis Bay. The team has a local rivalry with Eleven Arrows F.C., which was formed by former players of Blue Waters in early 1960s.

The team plays in the country's highest league, the Namibia Premiership. Blue Waters F.C., formed in 1936, is one of the oldest football clubs in Namibia. Parri Shekupe, Matthew Amadhila, Bobby Kurtz, Hendrik Dawids, Eusebio Kandjai, Moloi Amadhila, Ivo de Gouveia, Phello Muatunga, Salathiel Ndjao, Koko Matatias, Striker Muaine, Dokkies Theodor, Karasa Mupupa, Sandro de Gouveia, Gottlieb Nakuta.

== History ==
Blue Waters started as a team established at the Old Location for Africans in Walvis Bay by Daniel Shimbambi, a teacher by profession. It was started on Sunday, 13 February 1936 by the eldest in the Old Location who saw the need to start a team for the OshiWambo-speaking community. The team won major cup tournaments, league titles and formed part as a pioneer in both premier leagues establishments in the country. Blue Waters was a founding member of the Namibia National Soccer League (1985–1989) and the Namibia Premier League (NPL) from 1990. The team was relegated only once in its history, which was during the 2008–2009 league season but gained immediate promotion the following season.

Blue Waters appointed Spanish coach Rubén Pinto Jimeno for the 2026–2027 season, with the aim of improving the team's playing style and training methods. He brings experience from both Spain and Cameroon.

== Coaches ==
- Uwe Bachmann
- Slugger Imbili
- Hendrik Dawids
- Koko Matatias Muatunga
- Peta Useb
- Sandro de Gouveia
- Lucky Richter
- Lucky Shipanga
- Shepherd Murape
- Sparks Gottlieb
- Mdota Shozi
- Gilbert Raswoka
- Gerald Gunther
- Ruben Pinto Jimeno

== Honours ==
- Namibia Premier League: 1988, 1996, 2000, 2004
- NFA Cup: 1994

== Performance in CAF competitions ==
- CAF Champions League: 2 appearances

1997 – withdrew in Preliminary Round
2005 – Preliminary Round

- CAF Cup: 1 appearance

1996 – First Round

== League record ==
=== Namibia Premier League ===
- 2010–11 – 7th
- 2011–12 – 2nd
- 2012–13 – 10th
- 2013–14 – 5th
- 2014–15 – 5th
- 2015–16 – 6th
- 2016–17 – League not played
- 2017–18– 13th
- 2018–19– 11th
- 2019–22 – League not played

=== Namibia Premiership ===
- 2022–23 – 2nd
- 2023–24 – 9th
- 2024–25 – 9th
- 2025–26 – 6th
