= Eleven Arrows F.C. =

Namibian football club

Eleven Arrows
- Full name: Eleven Arrows Football Club
- Founded: 1961; 65 years ago
- Ground: Kuisebmund Stadium, Walvis Bay
- Capacity: 4,000
- Chairman: JJ Doeseb
- League: Namibia Premiership
- 2025–26: 8th
Home colours	Away colours

Eleven Arrows is a Namibian professional football club based in Walvis Bay. Founded in 1961, the club competes in country's highest division, the Namibia Premiership.

== Achievements ==
- Namibia Premier League: 1

1991

- NFA-Cup: 1

2011

== Performance in CAF competitions ==
- African Cup of Champions Clubs: 1 appearance

1992: Preliminary Round
