= Mighty Gunners F.C. =

Namibian football club

Mighty Gunners
- Full name: Mighty Gunners Football Club
- Founded: 2003
- Ground: Mokati Stadium, Otjiwarongo, Namibia
- Capacity: 1,000
- League: Namibia Premiership
- 2025–26: 3rd
Home colours	Away colours

Mighty Gunners is a football club in Otjiwarongo, Namibia. It plays in the Namibia Premier League and in Mokati Stadium. The club is made up by members of the Namibian Army's 4 Artillery Brigade (Namibia) based in Otjiwarongo.

Gunners won the 2026 Top 8 Cup.

In November 2025, the club introduced a cash award for player of the match, aimed at increasing player morale and boosting performance.
