= United Africa Tigers =

Namibian football club

Tigers Sports Club
- Full name: Tigers Sports Club
- Nickname: Ingweinyama
- Founded: 1927
- Ground: Sam Nujoma Stadium; Windhoek, Namibia
- Capacity: 10,300
- Manager: James Britz
- League: Namibia Premiership
- 2025–26: 14th (relegated)
Home colours	Away colours

Tigers Sports Club is a Namibian football club. It is based in the Namibian capital Windhoek, and play in the country's top league, the Namibia Premier Football League. In the 1990s, they were sponsored by Mukorob Pelagic and referred to as the MP Tigers.

== Achievements ==
- Namibia Premier League
  - Champions (2): 1985, 2015–16
- NFA-Cup
  - Winners (3): 1995, 1996, 2015
