= African Stars F.C. =

Namibian football club

African Stars FC
- Full name: African Stars Football Club
- Nicknames: Okaserandu ndjari pejovi Samba Boys, Starlile
- Founded: 1962; 64 years ago
- Ground: Sam Nujoma Stadium, Windhoek
- Capacity: 10,300
- Chairman: Salomo Hei
- League: Namibia Premiership
- 2025–26: 1st, Champions
| Home colours | Away colours |

The African Stars Football Club are a professional Namibian football club from Windhoek. They play in the country's highest division, the Namibia Premiership.

== Achievements ==
- Namibia Premiership
  - Champions (4): 2022–23, 2023–24, 2024–25, 2025–26
- Namibia Premier League
  - Champions (5): 1994, 2008–09, 2009–10, 2014–15, 2017–18
- Namibian Cup
  - Champions (6): 2007, 2010, 2013, 2014, 2018, 2024
- Standard Bank Cup
  - Champions (1): 2015
  - Runners-up (1): 2014
- Dr. Hage Geingob Cup
  - Runners-up (1): 2014, 2015,2022
  - Third place (1): 2016

== Performance in CAF competitions ==
- CAF Champions League: 2 appearances

2019 – first round
2020 – preliminary round

- CAF Confederation Cup: 1 appearance

2014 – preliminary round

- CAF Cup: 1 appearance

1992 – first round
