= Black Africa S.C. =

Namibian football club

Black Africa SC
- Full name: Black Africa Sports Club
- Nickname: Lively Lions
- Short name: BA
- Founded: 1964; 62 years ago
- Ground: Sam Nujoma Stadium, Windhoek
- Capacity: 10,300
- Chairman: Scara Khaiseb
- Coach: Brain Isaacs
- League: Namibia First Division
Home colours	Away colours

Black Africa Sports Club is a Namibian football team from Katutura, Windhoek that plays in the Namibia First Division.

== Performance ==
Season	League	Place	Ref.
2022/23	Namibia Premier Football League	14th	
2021/22	No League		
2020/21	No League		
2019/20	No League		
2018/19	Namibia Premier League	1st	
2017/18	Namibia Premier League	2nd	
2016/17	Namibia Premier League	Cancelled	
2015/16	Namibia Premier League	2nd	
2014/15	Namibia Premier League	2nd	
2013/14	Namibia Premier League	1st	
2012/13	Namibia Premier League	1st	
2011/12	Namibia Premier League	1st	
2010/11	Namibia Premier League	1st	
2009/10	Namibia Premier League	3rd	
2008/09	Namibia Premier League	3rd	
2007/08	Namibia Premier League	4th	
2006/07	Namibia Premier League	8th	
2005/06	Namibia Premier League	5th	
2004/05	Namibia Premier League	6th	
2003/04	Namibia Premier League	7th	
2002/03	Namibia Premier League	7th	
2001/02	Namibia Premier League	4th-12th	
2000	Namibia Premier League	2nd	
1999	Namibia Premier League	1st	
1997/8	Namibia Premier League	1st	
1996	Namibia Premier League	2nd?	
1995	Namibia Premier League	1st	
1994	Namibia Premier League	3rd Group B	
1993	Namibia Premier League	2nd	
1992	Namibia Premier League	11th	
1991	Namibia Premier League	6th	
1990	Namibia Premier League	3rd Group B	
1989	NNSL	1st	
1988	NNSL Super League	9th	
1987	NNSL Super League	1st	
1986	NNSL Super League	5th	
1985	NNSL Super League	5th-7th	

== Achievements ==
- Namibia Premier League: 10
  - 1987, 1989, 1995, 1998, 1999, 2011, 2012, 2013, 2014, 2019
- NFA-Cup: 3
  - 1990, 1993, 2004

== Performance in CAF competitions ==
- CAF Champions League: 1 appearance

2014 – Preliminary Round

- African Cup of Champions Clubs: 1 appearance

1996 – First Round

- CAF Cup Winners' Cup: 2 appearances

1991 – Preliminary Round
1994 – withdrew in Preliminary Round
