= Bucks Buccaneers FC =

Namibian football club

- Founded: 1983; 43 years ago (as Civics FC)
- Ground: Sam Nujoma Stadium, Windhoek
- Capacity: 10,300
- Manager: Ronnie Kanalelo
- League: Namibia Premiership
- 2025–26: 10th
| Home colours | Away colours |

Bucks Buccaneers Football Club is a Namibian football club based in Windhoek. Until January 2025 the club have had the name Civics Football Club. Bucks Buccaneers FC play in the highest division of Namibian football, the Namibia Premiership. The club has its home in Khomasdal, in the north of the Namibian capital Windhoek.

They play their home games at Sam Nujoma Stadium in Katutura, Windhoek.

== History ==
FC Civics were founded by a group of young students in 1983, who initially named the team after a local street – Bethlehem Boys. The club later became the Mighty Civilians before being recast again as Civics. Even today, the bulk of the squad comes either from Khomasdal or the neighbouring township of Katutura.

The club rose from a useful street team to Namibia's top league with the help of Helmut Scharnowski, from the northern German city of Flensburg.

From 2000 until 2007, the club was also known as Buschschule Civics.

In January 2025, it was announced that the club had been sold to a new ownership group and official rebranded to Bucks Buccaneers FC.

== Achievements ==
- Namibia Premier League: 3

2005, 2006, 2007

- NFA-Cup: 3

2003, 2008, 2021

== Performance in CAF competitions ==
- CAF Champions League: 3 appearances

2004 – First Round
2006 – Second Round
2007 – First Round
