= Namibia Premier League =

- Founded: 1990
- Country: Namibia
- Confederation: CAF
- Number of clubs: 16 (1990–2004); 12 (2004–2014); 16 (2014–2019)
- Level on pyramid: 1
- Relegation to: First Division
- Domestic cups: NFA Cup; Namibian Newspaper Cup; Standard Bank Super Cup
- International cups: Champions League; Confederation Cup
- Most championships: Black Africa (10)
- Current: Discontinued

The Namibia Premier League (NPL) was the highest level of domestic football in Namibia that began following the independence of Namibia in 1990 and was disbanded after the 2018–19 season. It is succeeded by the Namibia Football Premier League, now Namibia Premiership, in 2022–23.

The league began with 16 teams, but got trimmed down to 12 teams from 2005 until 2014, when the 16-team format was reinstated. It was disbanded in 2020 after problems with the Namibia Football Association, which broke the bond they had with the league organizer. The country's top-flight returned in the 2022–23 season with African Stars against UNAM FC at the Hage Geingob Rugby Stadium.

== Previous champions ==
- 1990 : Orlando Pirates (Windhoek)
- 1991 : Eleven Arrows (Walvis Bay)
- 1992 : Ramblers (Windhoek)
- 1993 : Chief Santos (Tsumeb)
- 1994 : African Stars (Windhoek)
- 1995 : Black Africa (Windhoek)
- 1996 : Blue Waters (Walvis Bay)
- 1997 : not contested
- 1998 : Black Africa (Windhoek)
- 1999 : Black Africa (Windhoek)
- 2000 : Blue Waters (Walvis Bay)
- 2001–02 : Liverpool (Okahandja)
- 2002–03 : Chief Santos (Tsumeb)
- 2003–04 : Blue Waters (Walvis Bay)
- 2004–05 : FC Civics (Windhoek)
- 2005–06 : FC Civics (Windhoek)
- 2006–07 : FC Civics (Windhoek)
- 2007–08 : Orlando Pirates (Windhoek)
- 2008–09 : African Stars (Windhoek)
- 2009–10 : African Stars (Windhoek)
- 2010–11 : Black Africa (Windhoek)
- 2011–12 : Black Africa (Windhoek)
- 2012–13 : Black Africa (Windhoek)
- 2013–14 : Black Africa (Windhoek)
- 2014-15: African Stars (Windhoek)
- 2015–16: Tigers (Windhoek)
- 2016–17 : Not played
- 2017–18: African Stars (Windhoek)
- 2018–19: Black Africa (Windhoek)
- 2019–22: Not played, discontinued

== Most titles ==
Club	Titles
Black Africa	10
African Stars	5
Blue Waters	4
FC Civics	3
Chief Santos	2
Orlando Pirates	2
Tigers	2
Chelsea (Grootfontein)	1
Eleven Arrows	1
Liverpool (Okahandja)	1
Ramblers	1

== Top goalscorers ==
Year	Best scorers	Team	Goals
2001–02	(Zambia) William Chilufya	Liverpool	29
2002–03	(Namibia) Immanuel Kooper		18
2003–04	(Namibia) Costa Khaiseb	Ramblers	30
2004–05	(Angola) Armando Pedro	Blue Waters	23
2005–06	(Namibia) Heinrich Isaacs	Civics Windhoek	20
2006–07	(Zambia) William Chilufya	Civics Windhoek	17
2007–08	(Namibia) Pineas Jacob	Ramblers	12
2008–09	(Namibia) Jerome Louis	Black Africa	22
2009–10	(Namibia) Jerome Louis	Black Africa	17
2010–11	(Namibia) Harold Ochurub	Mighty Gunners	12
2011–12	(Namibia) Jerome Louis (Namibia) Richard Kavendji	Black Africa; Hotspurs	12
2012–13	(Namibia) Harold Ochurub		13
2013–14	(Namibia) Hendrik Somaeb	Blue Waters	17
2014–15	(Namibia) Nicky Musambini		17
2015–16	(Namibia) Terdius Uiseb	Orlando Pirates	20
2017–18	(Namibia) Panduleni Nekundi	African Stars	15
2018–19	(Namibia) Isaskar Gurirab	Life Fighters	23

== Multiple hat-tricks ==
Rank	Country	Player	Hat-tricks
1	(Namibia)	Marco Van Wyk	2
2	(Namibia)	Riaan Cloete	1
2	(Namibia)	Moses Kanjuku	1
2	(Namibia)	Jerome Louis	1
2	(Namibia)	Dokkies Schmidth	1

== See also ==
- NFA Cup
