= Namibia national football team results (1990–2019) =

The Namibia national football team represents Namibia in international football under the control of the Namibia Football Association (NFA). After Namibia gained independence, the football association was founded in 1990 and became a member of FIFA and the CAF in 1992. The team played its first official match on 7 June 1990 in Windhoek against Mauritius, resulting in a 1–2 defeat. The match, which was played at the Independence Stadium, also included the nation's first official goal, a 26th-minute strike by Frans Nicodemus.

The following list contains all of Namibia's official matches from 1990 to 2019.

== Pre-FIFA results ==
16 May 1989 Friendly	Namibia	0–1	Angola	Windhoek, Namibia
		Report

23 March 1990 Friendly	Namibia	1–5	Zimbabwe	Windhoek, Namibia
		Report

== Official results ==
=== 1990 ===
7 June Friendly	Namibia	1–2	Mauritius	Windhoek, Namibia
	Frans Nicodemus 26'	Report		Stadium: Independence Stadium

=== 1992 ===
1 August Friendly	Lesotho	2–0	Namibia	Lesotho
		Report

2 August Friendly	Lesotho	2–2	Namibia	Lesotho
		Report

11 October 1994 FIFA World Cup qualification Group H	Madagascar	3–0	Namibia	Antananarivo, Madagascar
	Jean-Paul 29'; Harry Elyse Randrianaivo 44', 58'	Report		Stadium: Mahamasina Municipal Stadium; Referee: Goinsamy Maunick (Mauritius)

25 October 1994 FIFA World Cup qualification Group H	Namibia	0–4	Zambia	Windhoek, Namibia
		Report	Moses Chikwalakwala 15', 35'; Kelvin Mutale 22', 26'	Stadium: Independence Stadium; Referee: Louis Yana Yana (Cameroon)

19 December 1994 FIFA World Cup qualification Group H	Tanzania	2–0	Namibia	Mwanza, Tanzania
	Edibily Lunyamila 52'; Felicien Minde 74'	Report		Stadium: CCM Kirumba Stadium; Referee: Charles Masembe (Uganda)

=== 1993 ===
17 January 1994 FIFA World Cup qualification Group H	Namibia	0–1	Madagascar	Windhoek, Namibia
		Report	Frederic Remi 3'	Stadium: Independence Stadium; Referee: Jelas Ntebu Masole (Botswana)

30 January 1994 FIFA World Cup qualification Group H	Zambia	4–0	Namibia	Lusaka, Zambia
	Wisdom Mumba Chansa 4'; Charly Musonda 2' (pen.); Kalusha Bwalya 79'; Kenan Simambe 84'	Report		Stadium: Independence Stadium; Referee: Jorge Mario Femandes (Angola)

=== 1994 ===
1 July Friendly	Botswana	0–1	Namibia	Botswana
		Report

16 August Friendly	Namibia	1–1	Botswana	Windhoek, Namibia
		Report		Stadium: Independence Stadium

18 August Friendly	Namibia	2–3	Botswana	Windhoek, Namibia
		Report		Stadium: Independence Stadium

4 September 1996 AFCON qualification Group 6	Angola	2–0	Namibia	Luanda, Angola
	João Paulo Arsénio Ribeiro 6'; Merodack 40'	Report		Stadium: Estádio da Cidadela

15 October 1996 AFCON qualification Group 6	Namibia	2–1	Mali	Windhoek, Namibia
	Silvester Goraseb 40'; Ruben van Wyk 57'	Report	Soumailia Traoré 89'	Stadium: Independence Stadium

13 November 1996 AFCON qualification Group 6	Namibia	1–1	Botswana	Windhoek, Namibia
	Ruben van Wyk 89'	Report	Boikago Modise 25'	Stadium: Independence Stadium

10 December Friendly	Namibia	2–1	Ivory Coast	Windhoek, Namibia
	Ruben van Wyk 62'; Ewald Hoeseb 75'	Report	Michel Bassolé	Stadium: Independence Stadium

=== 1995 ===
8 January 1996 AFCON qualification Group 6	Guinea	3–0	Namibia	Conakry, Guinea
	Abdoul Camara 62'; Abdoul Salam Sow 69'; Mohamed Sylla 88'	Report		Stadium: Stade du 28 Septembre

22 January 1996 AFCON qualification Group 6	Mozambique	4–2	Namibia	Maputo, Mozambique
	Nuro Tualibudane Amino 6', 30', 90'; Eurico 68'	Report	Ewald Hoeseb 72'; Paul Boonstaander 90'	Stadium: Estádio da Machava; Referee: Jugdish Kisoona (Mauritius)

9 April 1996 AFCON qualification Group 6	Namibia	2–2	Angola	Windhoek, Namibia
	Lucky Richter 11'; Silvester Goraseb 61'	Report	Paulo António Alves 8'; Joaquim Alberto Silva 76'	Stadium: Independence Stadium

23 April 1996 AFCON qualification Group 6	Mali	2–0	Namibia	Bamako, Mali
	Modibo Sidibé 16'; Abdoul Karim Magassouba 66'	Report		Stadium: Stade Modibo Kéïta; Referee: Bruce Kouahlin (Togo)

4 June 1996 AFCON qualification Group 6	Botswana	1–1	Namibia	Gaborone, Botswana
	Magomtosi Dintle 5'	Report	Frans Ananias 18'	Stadium: National Stadium

15 July 1996 AFCON qualification Group 6	Namibia	0–0	Guinea	Windhoek, Namibia
		Report		Stadium: Independence Stadium

30 July 1996 AFCON qualification Group 6	Namibia	0–0	Mozambique	Windhoek, Namibia
		Report		Stadium: Independence Stadium; Referee: Joel Dwarf Mondoka (Zambia)

=== 1996 ===
1 June 1998 FIFA World Cup qualification First round	Namibia	2–0	Mozambique	Windhoek, Namibia
	Ewald Hoeseb 28'; Johannes Ortmann 80'	Report		Stadium: Independence Stadium; Referee: Antonio Augusto Silva (Angola)

16 June 1998 FIFA World Cup qualification First round	Mozambique	1–1	Namibia	Maputo, Mozambique
	Armando Macamo 25'	Report	Gervatius Uri Khob 84'	Stadium: Estádio da Machava; Referee: Milson Bahirah Jaky (Madagascar)

11 August 1998 AFCON qualification Preliminary round	Botswana	0–0	Namibia	Gaborone, Botswana
		Report		Stadium: National Stadium; Referee: Felix Tangawarima (Zimbabwe)

25 August 1998 AFCON qualification Preliminary round	Namibia	6–0	Botswana	Windhoek, Namibia
	Johannes Hindjou, Ruben van Wyk, Silvanus Njambari; Gervatius Uri Khob	Report		Stadium: Independence Stadium

5 October 1998 AFCON qualification Group 5	Namibia	1–0	Kenya	Windhoek, Namibia
	Francis Oduor (o.g.)	Report		Stadium: Independence Stadium

8 November 1998 FIFA World Cup qualification Group 2	Egypt	7–1	Namibia	Cairo, Egypt
	Ali Maher 1', 15', 69'; Ahmed Hassan 11'; Ibrahim Hassan 34'; Hossam Hassan 72', 83'	Report	Eliphas Shivute 24'	Stadium: Cairo International Stadium; Referee: Sidi Magassa (Mali)

=== 1997 ===
11 January 1998 FIFA World Cup qualification Group 2	Namibia	0–0	Liberia	Windhoek, Namibia
		Report		Stadium: Independence Stadium; Referee: Petros Mathabela (South Africa)

26 January 1998 AFCON qualification Group 5	Cameroon	4–0	Namibia	Yaoundé, Cameroon
	Patrick M'Boma 3', 85'; Jean-Jacques Missé-Missé 35', 48'	Report		Stadium: Stade Omnisports

22 February 1998 AFCON qualification Group 5	Namibia	1–1	Gabon	Windhoek, Namibia
	Ruben Van Wyk 86'	Report	Pierre Aubameyang 19' (pen.)	Stadium: Independence Stadium

16 March 1997 COSAFA Cup Qualifying round	Namibia	2–1	Zimbabwe	Gaborone, Botswana
	Johannes Hindjou 87' (pen.), 119' (pen.)	Report	Gilbert Mushangazhike 76' (pen.)	Stadium: National Stadium

6 April 1998 FIFA World Cup qualification Group 2	Namibia	1–2	Tunisia	Windhoek, Namibia
	Mohammed Ouseb 74'	Report	Taoufik Herichi 15'; Khaled Badra 68'	Stadium: Independence Stadium; Referee: Milson Jaky (Madagascar)

26 April 1998 FIFA World Cup qualification Group 2	Namibia	2–3	Egypt	Windhoek, Namibia
	Simon Uutoni 62'; Mohammed Ouseb 87' (pen.)	Report	Hossam Hassan 77', 89'; Hady Khashaba 79' (pen.)	Stadium: Independence Stadium; Referee: Amuam Aka (Cameroon)

31 May 1997 COSAFA Cup	Tanzania	0–0	Namibia	Mwanza, Tanzania
		Report		Stadium: CCM Kirumba Stadium

8 June 1998 FIFA World Cup qualification Group 2	Liberia	1–2	Namibia	Accra, Ghana
	Prince Daye 5'	Report	Eliphas Shivute 35'; Gervatius Uri Khob 82'	Stadium: Accra Sports Stadium; Referee: Jean-Fidèle Diramba (Gabon)

21 June 1998 AFCON qualification Group 5	Kenya	0–1	Namibia	Nairobi, Kenya
		Report	Gervatius Uri Khob 35'	Stadium: Moi International Sports Centre

28 June 1997 COSAFA Cup	Namibia	4–1	Malawi	Windhoek, Namibia
	Gervatius Uri Khob 35'; Sandro de Gouveia 57'; Johannes Hindjou 69'; Eliphas Shivute 75'	Report	Lovemore Fazili 77'	Stadium: Independence Stadium

12 July 1998 AFCON qualification Group 5	Namibia	0–1	Cameroon	Windhoek, Namibia
		Report	Joseph Marie Tchango 69'	Stadium: Independence Stadium; Referee: Felix Tangawarima (Zimbabwe)

20 July 1997 COSAFA Cup	Mozambique	1–1	Namibia	Maputo, Mozambique
	Pinto Barros 15'	Report	Silvester Goraseb 44'	Stadium: Estádio da Machava

27 July 1998 AFCON qualification Group 5	Cameroon	1–1	Namibia	Libreville, Gabon
	Pierre Aubameyang 22' (pen.)	Report	Johannes Hindjou 60' (pen.)	Stadium: Stade Omar Bongo

17 August 1998 FIFA World Cup qualification Group 2	Tunisia	4–0	Namibia	Tunis, Tunisia
	Zoubier Baya 19', 57'; Skander Souayah 31'; Jameleddine Limam 70'	Report		Stadium: Stade El Menzah; Referee: Salah Ahmed Mohamed Salih (Sudan)

31 August 1997 COSAFA Cup	Namibia	1–1	Zambia	Windhoek, Namibia
	Mohammed Ouseb 47' (pen.)	Report	David Siame 32'	Stadium: Independence Stadium

30 October Friendly	Lesotho	2–1	Namibia	Maseru, Lesotho
			Alele Kapule	Stadium: Setsoto Stadium

=== 1998 ===
24 January 1998 COSAFA Cup Qualifying round	Namibia	3–2 (aet)	South Africa	Windhoek, Namibia
	Stanley Goagoseb 44'; Bimbo Tjihero 89'; Berlin Auchumeb 100'	Report	Thabo Mooki 39'; Phil Masinga 62'	Stadium: Independence Stadium

30 January Friendly	Niger	1–2	Namibia	Niger
		Report	Petrus Haraseb

1 February Friendly	Burkina Faso	1–3	Namibia	Niger
		Report	Eliphas Shivute

8 February 1998 AFCON Group C	Ivory Coast	4–3	Namibia	Bobo-Dioulasso, Burkina Faso
	Joël Tiéhi 2', 39'; Ibrahima Bakayoko 34'; Lassina Diabaté 83'	Report	Eliphas Shivute 46', 73'; Ricardo Mannetti 70'	Stadium: Stade Municipal; Referee: Karim Dahou (Algeria)

12 February 1998 AFCON Group C	Angola	3–3	Namibia	Bobo-Dioulasso, Burkina Faso
	Lázaro Oliveira 46'; Paulo Jorge Da Silva 67' (pen.); Miguel Pereira 86'	Report	Gervatius Uri Khob 20', 51'; Robert Nauseb 33'	Stadium: Stade Municipal; Referee: Falla N'Doye (Senegal)

16 February 1998 AFCON Group C	South Africa	4–1	Namibia	Bobo-Dioulasso, Burkina Faso
	Benni McCarthy 8', 11', 19', 21'	Report	Simon Uutonii 68'	Stadium: Stade Municipal; Referee: Karim Dahou (Algeria)

19 April 1998 COSAFA Cup	Zimbabwe	5–2	Namibia	Harare, Zimbabwe
	Shepherd Muradzikwa 36'; Benjamin Nkonjera 44' (pen.); Tauya Mrewa 53'; Peter Ndlovu 72'; Kingstone Rinhemota 81'	Report	Gervatius Uri Khob 55'; Clemens Khaiseb 89'

17 May Friendly	Saudi Arabia	2–1	Namibia	France
	Sami Al-Jaber 41'; Ibrahim Suwayed 77'	Report	Robert Nauseb 31'

30 May 1998 COSAFA Cup	Namibia	1–1	Angola	Windhoek, Namibia
	Fillemon Angula 23'	Report	Miguel Francisco Pereira 48'	Stadium: Independence Stadium

1 August 2000 AFCON qualification Preliminary round	Namibia	2–1	Malawi	Windhoek, Namibia
	Bobby Samaria 9'; Robert Nauseb 60'	Report	Cedric Nakhumwa 22'	Stadium: Independence Stadium

8 August 1998 COSAFA Cup	Zambia	1–1	Namibia	Lusaka, Zambia
	Hillary Makasa 23'	Report	Johannes Hindjou 43'

15 August 2000 AFCON qualification Preliminary round	Malawi	0–1	Namibia	Blantyre, Malawi
		Report	Robert Nauseb 15'	Stadium: Kamuzu Stadium

12 September 1998 COSAFA Cup	Namibia	2–1	Mozambique	Windhoek, Namibia
	Razundara Tjikuzu 89'; Eliphas Shivute 89'	Report	Paulito 41'	Stadium: Independence Stadium

3 October 2000 AFCON qualification Group 3	Namibia	0–1	Congo	Windhoek, Namibia
		Report	Brice Mokossi 80'	Stadium: Independence Stadium; Referee: Edwin Senai (Botswana)

=== 1999 ===
24 January 2000 AFCON qualification Group 3	Ivory Coast	3–0	Namibia	Abidjan, Ivory Coast
	Hamed Modibo Diallo 10', 90'; Ibrahima Diomandé 32'	Report		Stadium: Stade Félix Houphouët-Boigny; Referee: Sillah Malick (Gambia)

7 February 1999 COSAFA Cup First qualifying round	Lesotho	1–0	Namibia	Maseru, Lesotho
	Teele Nts'onyana 11'	Report		Stadium: Setsoto Stadium

3 April Friendly	Eswatini	1–1	Namibia	Lobamba, Swaziland (since 2018 renamed to Eswatini)
	Teele Nts'onyana 11'	Report		Stadium: Somhlolo National Stadium

11 April 2000 AFCON qualification Group 3	Mali	2–1	Namibia	Bamako, Mali
	Mallal N'Diaye 53'; Yaya Dissa 81'	Report	Gervatius Uri Khob 53'	Stadium: Stade Modibo Kéïta; Referee: Seydou Ba (Mauritania)

8 May 2000 AFCON qualification Group 3	Namibia	0–0	Mali	Windhoek, Namibia
		Report		Stadium: National Stadium; Referee: Eusebio Alfredo (Mozambique)

22 May 1999 COSAFA Cup Second qualifying round	Malawi	1–1 (2–4 p)	Namibia	Blantyre, Malawi
	Bimbo Tjihero 43' (o.g.)	Report	Simon Uutoni 1'	Stadium: Kamuzu Stadium

5 June 2000 AFCON qualification Group 3	Namibia	1–1	Ivory Coast	Windhoek, Namibia
	Quinton Jacobs 56'	Report	Hamed Modibo Diallo 78'	Stadium: National Stadium; Referee: Antônio da Silva (Angola)

20 June 2000 AFCON qualification Group 3	Congo	3–0	Namibia	Pointe-Noire, Republic of the Congo
	Richard Bokatola 24'; Roland Buitys 53'; Rolf-Christel Guié-Mien 87'	Report		Stadium: Stade Municipal; Referee: Olaniyan Olufemi (Nigeria)

31 July 1999 COSAFA Cup Quarter-final	Namibia	1–1 (4–1 p)	South Africa	Windhoek, Namibia
	Johannes Hindjou 50'	Report	Pollen Ndlanya 32'	Stadium: Independence Stadium

28 August 1999 COSAFA Cup Semi-final	Namibia	1–1 (4–2 p)	Eswatini	Windhoek, Namibia
	Silvester Goraseb 67'	Report	Dennis Masina 88'	Stadium: Independence Stadium

26 September 1999 COSAFA Cup Final	Angola	1–0	Namibia	Luanda, Angola
	Betinho 14' (pen.)	Report		Stadium: Estádio da Cidadela

2 October 1999 COSAFA Cup Final	Namibia	1–1	Angola	Windhoek, Namibia
	Eliphas Shivute 7'	Report	Zico 101'	Stadium: Independence Stadium

15 November Friendly	Namibia	0–1	Egypt	Windhoek, Namibia
		Report	Hady Khashaba	Stadium: Independence Stadium
