= 1998 COSAFA Cup =

Tournament details
- Teams: 10 (from 1 confederation)

Final positions
- Champions: Zambia (2nd title)
- Runners-up: Zimbabwe
- Third place: Angola

Tournament statistics
- Matches played: 15
- Goals scored: 37 (2.47 per match)

This page provides summaries of the 1998 COSAFA Cup, the second edition of the tournament.

Participating nations in 1997 COSAFA Cup: Final round / Qualifying round

== Qualifying round ==
January 10, 1998

Malawi	0 – 1	Zambia
		Kenneth Malitoli 39'

Blantyre
Attendance: 40,000
January 18, 1998

Lesotho	0 – 2	Zimbabwe
		Benjamin Nkonjera 47'; Teele Nts'onyana 55' (o.g.)

Maseru
Attendance: 12,000
January 24, 1998

Namibia	3 – 2 (aet)	South Africa
Stanley Goagoseb 44'; Bimbo Tjihero 89'; Berlin Auchumeb 100'		Thabo Mooki 39'; Phil Masinga 62'

Windhoek
Attendance: 20,000
January 25, 1998

Botswana	1 – 2	Mozambique
Tshepiso Molwantwa 78'		Tico-Tico 82'; Avelino 86'

Gaborone
Attendance: 18,000
March 8, 1998

Swaziland	0 – 1 (aet)	Angola
		Jerry Gamedze 100' (o.g.)

Somhlolo National Stadium, Lobamba
Attendance: 5,000

== Final round ==
Team	Pts	Pld	W	D	L	GF	GA
Zambia	8	4	2	2	0	4	2
Zimbabwe	6	4	2	0	2	8	5
Angola	6	4	1	3	0	5	4
Namibia	5	4	1	2	1	6	8
Mozambique	1	4	0	1	3	2	6

April 19, 1998

Zimbabwe	5 – 2	Namibia
Shepherd Muradzikwa 36'; Benjamin Nkonjera 44' (pen.); Tauya Mrewa 53'; Peter Ndlovu 72'; Kingstone Rinhemota 81'		Gervatius Uri Khob 55'; Clemens Khaiseb 89'

Harare
Attendance: 20,000
May 3, 1998

Angola	1 – 1	Zambia
Chicangala 65'		Masauso Tembo 49'

Luanda
Attendance: 15,000
May 16, 1998

Zambia	1 – 0	Mozambique
Allan Kamwanga 1'

Lusaka
Attendance: 8,000
May 24, 1998

Mozambique	0 – 2	Zimbabwe
		Peter Ndlovu 81'; Shepherd Muradzikwa 85'

Maputo
Attendance: 2,000
May 30, 1998

Namibia	1 – 1	Angola
Fillemon Angula 23'		Miguel Pereira 48'

Windhoek
Attendance: 8,000
July 19, 1998

Mozambique	1 – 1	Angola
Arnaldo 85'		Minhas 51'

Maputo
Attendance: 15,000
August 8, 1998

Zambia	1 – 1	Namibia
Hillary Makasa 23'		Johannes Hindjou 43'

Lusaka
Attendance: 15,000
August 30, 1998

Angola	2 – 1	Zimbabwe
Betinho 36'; Amaral 59'		Tauya Mrewa 39'

Luanda
Attendance: 25,000
September 12, 1998

Namibia	2 – 1	Mozambique
Razundara Tjikuzu 89'; Eliphas Shivute 89'		Paulito 41'

Windhoek
Attendance: 8,000
September 27, 1998

Zimbabwe	0 – 1	Zambia
		Rotson Kilambe 79'

Harare
Attendance: 25,000

1998 COSAFA Cup Winner:

Zambia
Second title
