= Angola at the Africa Cup of Nations =

Angola has participated in the Africa Cup of Nations nine times, made their debut in 1996. The country's best achievement is reaching the quarter-finals in 2008, 2010 and 2023. They also hosted the 2010 edition.

== Overall record ==
Africa Cup of Nations record										Africa Cup of Nations qualification					
Year	Round	Position	Pld	W	D*	L	GF	GA	Squad	Pld	W	D	L	GF	GA
(Sudan) 1957	Part of Portugal									Part of Portugal					
(United Arab Republic) 1959	Part of Portugal									Part of Portugal					
(Ethiopia) 1962	Part of Portugal									Part of Portugal					
(Ghana) 1963	Part of Portugal									Part of Portugal					
(Tunisia) 1965	Part of Portugal									Part of Portugal					
(Ethiopia) 1968	Part of Portugal									Part of Portugal					
(Sudan) 1970	Part of Portugal									Part of Portugal					
(Cameroon) 1972	Part of Portugal									Part of Portugal					
(Egypt) 1974	Part of Portugal									Part of Portugal					
(Ethiopia) 1976	Not affiliated to CAF									Not affiliated to CAF					
(Ghana) 1978	Not affiliated to CAF									Not affiliated to CAF					
(Nigeria) 1980	Not affiliated to CAF									Not affiliated to CAF					
(Libya) 1982	Did not qualify									2	0	2	0	1	1
(Ivory Coast) 1984	Did not qualify									4	2	1	1	7	4
(Egypt) 1986	Did not enter									Did not enter					
(Morocco) 1988	Did not qualify									4	2	0	2	2	4
(Algeria) 1990	Did not qualify									4	1	1	2	5	7
(Senegal) 1992	Did not qualify									6	0	3	3	3	6
(Tunisia) 1994	Did not enter									Did not enter					
(South Africa) 1996	Group stage	13th	3	0	1	2	4	6	Squad	10	6	2	2	17	8
(Burkina Faso) 1998	Group stage	13th	3	0	2	1	5	8	Squad	4	2	0	2	4	4
(Ghana) (Nigeria) 2000	Did not qualify									8	2	2	4	10	12
(Mali) 2002	Did not qualify									8	4	2	2	12	8
(Tunisia) 2004	Did not qualify									4	1	2	1	7	4
(Egypt) 2006	Group stage	9th	3	1	1	1	4	5	Squad	12	7	3	2	15	9
(Ghana) 2008	Quarter-finals	6th	4	1	2	1	5	4	Squad	6	4	1	1	16	5
(Angola) 2010	Quarter-finals	5th	4	1	2	1	6	5	Squad	6	3	1	2	11	8
(Equatorial Guinea) (Gabon) 2012	Group stage	11th	3	1	1	1	4	5	Squad	6	4	0	2	7	5
(South Africa) 2013	Group stage	14th	3	0	1	2	1	4	Squad	2	1	0	1	3	3
(Equatorial Guinea) 2015	Did not qualify									6	1	3	2	5	5
(Gabon) 2017	Did not qualify									6	1	2	3	7	8
(Egypt) 2019	Group stage	18th	3	0	2	1	1	2	Squad	6	4	0	2	9	6
(Cameroon) 2021	Did not qualify									6	1	1	4	4	7
(Ivory Coast) 2023	Quarter-finals	6th	5	3	1	1	9	4	Squad	6	2	3	1	6	5
(Morocco) 2025	Group stage	17th	3	0	2	1	2	3	Squad	6	4	2	0	7	2
(Kenya) (Tanzania) (Uganda) 2027	To be determined									To be determined					
2029	To be determined									To be determined					
Total	Quarter-finals	10/35	34	7	15	12	41	46	—	112	54	31	39	158	121

== Tournaments ==
=== 1996 African Cup of Nations ===
==== Group stage ====
Pos	Team	Pld	W	D	L	GF	GA	GD	Pts	Qualification
1	South Africa (H)	3	2	0	1	4	1	+3	6	Advance to knockout stage
2	Egypt	3	2	0	1	4	3	+1	6	Advance to knockout stage
3	Cameroon	3	1	1	1	5	7	−2	4	
4	Angola	3	0	1	2	4	6	−2	1	

Updated to match(es) played on unknown. Source:
(H) Hosts
15 January 1996

Egypt	2–1	Angola
El-Kass 30', 33'		Quinzinho 77'

FNB Stadium, Johannesburg
Attendance: 6,000
Referee: Sidi Bekaye Magassa (Mali)

20 January 1996

South Africa	1–0	Angola
Williams 57'

FNB Stadium, Johannesburg
Attendance: 28,000
Referee: Fethi Boucetta (Tunisia)

24 January 1996

Angola	3–3	Cameroon
Joni 38' (pen.); Paulão 57'; Quinzinho 80'		Omam-Biyik 25'; Mouyeme 82'; Vicente 90' (o.g.)

Kings Park Stadium, Durban
Attendance: 6,000
Referee: Mohamed Kouradji (Algeria)

=== 1998 African Cup of Nations ===
==== Group stage ====
Pos	Team	Pld	W	D	L	GF	GA	GD	Pts	Qualification
1	Ivory Coast	3	2	1	0	10	6	+4	7	Advance to knockout stage
2	South Africa	3	1	2	0	5	2	+3	5	Advance to knockout stage
3	Angola	3	0	2	1	5	8	−3	2	
4	Namibia	3	0	1	2	7	11	−4	1	

Updated to match(es) played on unknown. Source:
8 February 1998
15:00

South Africa	0–0	Angola

Stade Municipal, Bobo-Dioulasso
Attendance: 20,000
Referee: Sidi Bekaye Magassa (Mali)

12 February 1998
18:15

Angola	3–3	Namibia
Lázaro 46'; Paulo Silva 67' (pen.); Miguel Pereira 86'		Uri Khob 20', 51'; Nauseb 33'

Stade Municipal, Bobo-Dioulasso
Attendance: 2,000
Referee: Falla N'Doye (Senegal)

16 February 1998
20:00

Ivory Coast	5–2	Angola
Guel 8', 23'; Tiéhi 43', 81' (pen.); Bakayoko 56'		Paulo Silva 27'; Quinzinho 52'

Stade Municipal, Ouagadougou
Attendance: 4,000
Referee: Maxime Camara (Guinea)

=== 2006 Africa Cup of Nations ===
==== Group stage ====
Pos	Team	Pld	W	D	L	GF	GA	GD	Pts	Qualification
1	Cameroon	3	3	0	0	7	1	+6	9	Advance to knockout stage
2	DR Congo	3	1	1	1	2	2	0	4	Advance to knockout stage
3	Angola	3	1	1	1	4	5	−1	4	
4	Togo	3	0	0	3	2	7	−5	0	

Updated to match(es) played on unknown. Source:
21 January 2006
17:15

Cameroon	3–1	Angola
Eto'o 20', 39', 78'	Report	Flávio 31' (pen.)

Cairo Military Academy Stadium, Cairo
Attendance: 8,000
Referee: Mohamed Guezzaz (Morocco)

25 January 2006
17:15

Angola	0–0	DR Congo
	Report

Cairo Military Academy Stadium, Cairo
Attendance: 2,000
Referee: Badara Diatta (Senegal)

29 January 2006
19:00

Angola	3–2	Togo
Flávio 9', 38'; Maurito 86'	Report	Kader 24'; Mamam 67'

Cairo International Stadium, Cairo
Attendance: 4,000
Referee: Abderrahim Al-Arjoune (Morocco)

=== 2008 Africa Cup of Nations ===
==== Group stage ====
Pos	Team	Pld	W	D	L	GF	GA	GD	Pts	Qualification
1	Tunisia	3	1	2	0	5	3	+2	5	Advance to knockout stage
2	Angola	3	1	2	0	4	2	+2	5	Advance to knockout stage
3	Senegal	3	0	2	1	4	6	−2	2	
4	South Africa	3	0	2	1	3	5	−2	2	

Updated to match(es) played on unknown. Source:
23 January 2008
19:30

South Africa	1–1	Angola
Van Heerden 87'	Report	Manucho 29'

Tamale Stadium, Tamale
Attendance: 15,000
Referee: Koman Coulibaly (Mali)

27 January 2008
17:00

Senegal	1–3	Angola
A. Faye 20'	Report	Manucho 50', 67'; Flávio 78'

Tamale Stadium, Tamale
Attendance: 10,000
Referee: Modou Sowe (Gambia)

31 January 2008
17:00

Tunisia	0–0	Angola
	Report

Tamale Stadium, Tamale
Attendance: 10,000
Referee: Coffi Codjia (Benin)

==== Quarter-finals ====
4 February 2008
17:00

Egypt	2–1	Angola
Hosny 23' (pen.); Zaki 38'	Report	Manucho 27'

Baba Yara Stadium, Kumasi
Attendance: 6,000
Referee: Yuichi Nishimura (Japan)

=== 2010 Africa Cup of Nations ===
==== Group stage ====
Pos	Team	Pld	W	D	L	GF	GA	GD	Pts	Qualification
1	Angola (H)	3	1	2	0	6	4	+2	5	Advance to knockout stage
2	Algeria	3	1	1	1	1	3	−2	4 (Note: Algeria finished ahead of Mali due to winning the match between the teams (see tie-breaking criteria).)	Advance to knockout stage
3	Mali	3	1	1	1	7	6	+1	4	
4	Malawi	3	1	0	2	4	5	−1	3	

Source: CAF
(H) Hosts
Notes:
10 January 2010
20:00

Angola	4–4	Mali
Flávio 36', 42'; Gilberto 67' (pen.); Manucho 74' (pen.)	Report	Keita 79', 90+3'; Kanouté 88'; Yatabaré 90+4'

Estádio 11 de Novembro, Luanda
Attendance: 45,000
Referee: Essam Abdel-Fatah (Egypt)

14 January 2010
19:30

Angola	2–0	Malawi
Flávio 49'; Manucho 55'	Report

Estádio 11 de Novembro, Luanda
Attendance: 48,500
Referee: Noumandiez Doué (Ivory Coast)

18 January 2010
17:00

Angola	0–0	Algeria
	Report

Estádio 11 de Novembro, Luanda
Attendance: 40,000
Referee: Jerome Damon (South Africa)

==== Quarter-finals ====
24 January 2010
17:00

Angola	0–1	Ghana
	Report	Gyan 15'

Estádio 11 de Novembro, Luanda
Attendance: 50,000
Referee: Mohamed Benouza (Algeria)

=== 2012 Africa Cup of Nations ===
==== Group stage ====
Pos	Team	Pld	W	D	L	GF	GA	GD	Pts	Qualification
1	Ivory Coast	3	3	0	0	5	0	+5	9	Advance to knockout stage
2	Sudan	3	1	1	1	4	4	0	4	Advance to knockout stage
3	Angola	3	1	1	1	4	5	−1	4	
4	Burkina Faso	3	0	0	3	2	6	−4	0	

Source: CAF
22 January 2012
20:00

Burkina Faso	1–2	Angola
A. Traoré 58'	Report	Mateus Galiano 48'; Manucho 68'

Estadio de Malabo, Malabo
Attendance: 17,000
Referee: Mohamed Benouza (Algeria)

26 January 2012
17:00

Sudan	2–2	Angola
Bashir 32', 74'	Report	Manucho 4', 50' (pen.)

Estadio de Malabo, Malabo
Attendance: 2,500
Referee: Ali Lemghaifry (Mauritania)

30 January 2012
19:00

Ivory Coast	2–0	Angola
Eboué 33'; Bony 64'	Report

Estadio de Malabo, Malabo
Attendance: 1,500
Referee: Slim Jedidi (Tunisia)

=== 2013 Africa Cup of Nations ===
==== Group stage ====
Pos	Team	Pld	W	D	L	GF	GA	GD	Pts	Qualification
1	South Africa (H)	3	1	2	0	4	2	+2	5	Advance to knockout stage
2	Cape Verde	3	1	2	0	3	2	+1	5	Advance to knockout stage
3	Morocco	3	0	3	0	3	3	0	3	
4	Angola	3	0	1	2	1	4	−3	1	

Source: CAF
(H) Hosts
19 January 2013
21:00

Angola	0–0	Morocco
	Report

Soccer City, Johannesburg
Attendance: 25,000
Referee: Badara Diatta (Senegal)

23 January 2013
17:00

South Africa	2–0	Angola
Sangweni 30'; Majoro 62'	Report

Moses Mabhida Stadium, Durban
Attendance: 40,000
Referee: Koman Coulibaly (Mali)

27 January 2013
19:00

Cape Verde	2–1	Angola
F. Varela 81'; Héldon 90+1'	Report	Nando 33' (o.g.)

Nelson Mandela Bay Stadium, Port Elizabeth
Attendance: 20,000
Referee: Slim Jedidi (Tunisia)

=== 2019 Africa Cup of Nations ===
==== Group stage ====
Pos	Team	Pld	W	D	L	GF	GA	GD	Pts	Qualification
1	Mali	3	2	1	0	6	2	+4	7	Advance to knockout stage
2	Tunisia	3	0	3	0	2	2	0	3	Advance to knockout stage
3	Angola	3	0	2	1	1	2	−1	2	
4	Mauritania	3	0	2	1	1	4	−3	2	

Source: CAF
24 June 2019
19:00

Tunisia	1–1	Angola
Msakni 34' (pen.)	Report	Djalma 73'

Suez Stadium, Suez
Attendance: 7,345
Referee: Bamlak Tessema Weyesa (Ethiopia)

29 June 2019
16:30

Mauritania	0–0	Angola
	Report

Suez Stadium, Suez
Attendance: 10,120
Referee: Ibrahim Nour El Din (Egypt)

2 July 2019
21:00

Angola	0–1	Mali
	Report	Haidara 37'

Ismailia Stadium, Ismailia
Attendance: 8,135
Referee: Redouane Jiyed (Morocco)

=== 2023 Africa Cup of Nations ===
==== Group stage ====
Pos	Team	Pld	W	D	L	GF	GA	GD	Pts	Qualification
1	Angola	3	2	1	0	6	3	+3	7	Advance to knockout stage
2	Burkina Faso	3	1	1	1	3	4	−1	4	Advance to knockout stage
3	Mauritania	3	1	0	2	3	4	−1	3	Advance to knockout stage
4	Algeria	3	0	2	1	3	4	−1	2	

Source: CAF
15 January 2024
20:00

Algeria	1–1	Angola
Bounedjah 18'	Report	Mabululu 68' (pen.)

Stade de la Paix, Bouaké
Attendance: 19,740
Referee: Issa Sy (Senegal)

20 January 2024
17:00

Mauritania	2–3	Angola
Amar 43'; Koita 58'	Report	Dala 30', 50'; Gilberto 53'

Stade de la Paix, Bouaké
Attendance: 36,318
Referee: Mohamed Maarouf (Egypt)

23 January 2024
20:00

Angola	2–0	Burkina Faso
Mabululu 36'; Zini 90+2'	Report

Charles Konan Banny Stadium, Yamoussoukro
Attendance: 15,753
Referee: Jean-Jacques Ndala (DR Congo)

==== Round of 16 ====
27 January 2024
17:00

Angola	3–0	Namibia
Dala 38', 42'; Mabululu 66'	Report

Stade de la Paix, Bouaké
Attendance: 28,663
Referee: Dahane Beida (Mauritania)

==== Quarter-finals ====
2 February 2024
17:00

Nigeria	1–0	Angola
Lookman 41'	Report

Felix Houphouet Boigny Stadium, Abidjan
Attendance: 18,757
Referee: Issa Sy (Senegal)

=== 2025 Africa Cup of Nations ===
==== Group stage ====
Pos	Team	Pld	W	D	L	GF	GA	GD	Pts	Qualification
1	Egypt	3	2	1	0	3	1	+2	7	Advance to knockout stage
2	South Africa	3	2	0	1	5	4	+1	6	Advance to knockout stage
3	Angola	3	0	2	1	2	3	−1	2	
4	Zimbabwe	3	0	1	2	4	6	−2	1	

Source: CAF
Rules for classification: Group stage tiebreakers

== Top Scored Angola's in AFCON ==
In 10 participations, Angola scored 41 goals in 34 games, being an own goal by Nandó in 2013 against Cape Verde. The best scored of Angola's history in AFCON is Manucho Gonçalves with 9 goals in 14 matches. The edition with more goals it was in 2023 with 9 goals

== See also ==
- Angola at the FIFA World Cup
