= 1998 African Cup of Nations qualification =

Football tournament

This page details the process of the 1998 African Cup of Nations Qualification phase. Burkina Faso, as hosts, and South Africa, as title holders, qualified automatically.

== Banned and withdrawn teams ==
Nigeria was banned for withdrawing from the 1996 final tournament.

The following countries were banned from entering for withdrawing during the qualifying stages:

- Gambia
- Guinea-Bissau
- Lesotho
- Madagascar
- Niger

These teams did not enter:

- Chad
- Djibouti
- Equatorial Guinea
- Libya
- Rwanda
- Somalia
- Swaziland
- Cape Verde

== Qualification rounds ==
=== Preliminary round ===
Team 1	Agg.	Team 2	1st leg	2nd leg
Mauritius	2–1	Seychelles	1–0	1–1
Congo	0–1	Togo	0–0	0–1
Botswana	0–6	Namibia	0–0	0–6
Central African Republic	w/o	Burundi	—	—
Benin	4–1	Mauritania	4–1	0–0
Uganda	2–2 (2–4 p)	Ethiopia	1–1	1–1

11 August 1996

Mauritius	1–0	Seychelles
Bax 25'

Stade Anjalay, Belle Vue Maurel
Attendance: 15,000
24 August 1996

Seychelles	1–1	Mauritius
Rose 50'		Mocude 20'

Stade Linité, Victoria
Attendance: 1,500

11 August 1996

Congo	0–0	Togo

Stade Municipal, Pointe-Noire
Attendance: 8,000
Referee: Pierre Mounguengui (Gabon)
25 August 1996

Togo	1–0	Congo
Salou 57'

Stade Municipal, Lomé
Attendance: 18,000
Referee: Olufemi Olaniyan (Nigeria)

11 August 1996

Botswana	0–0	Namibia

National Stadium, Gaborone
Attendance: 15,000
Referee: Felix Tangawarima (Zimbabwe)
25 August 1996

Namibia	6–0	Botswana

Independence Stadium, Windhoek
Attendance: 4,000

11 August 1996

Central African Republic	Cancelled	Burundi
		Withdrew

Bangui
25 August 1996

Burundi	Cancelled	Central African Republic
Withdrew

Bujumbura

8 August 1996

Benin	4–1	Mauritania
Coles 3'; Bessan 54', 72', 89'		Ould Bechir 67'

Stade de l'Amitié, Cotonou
Attendance: 11,500
Referee: Dodji Hounnake-Kouassi (Togo)
30 August 1996

Mauritania	0–0	Benin

Stade Olympique, Nouakchott
Attendance: 4,000

11 August 1996

Uganda	1–1	Ethiopia
Buwembo 65'		Goal

Nakivubo Stadium, Kampala
Attendance: 12,000
25 August 1996

Ethiopia	1–1	Uganda
Penalties
	4–2

Addis Ababa Stadium, Addis Ababa
Attendance: 25,000

=== Qualifying group stage ===
==== Group 1 ====
Sudan withdrew on 16 January 1997, due to unrest in the east of the country. They had already competed one match (0–3 lost to Zimbabwe at home), but this result was later annulled.

Team	Pld	W	D	L	GF	GA	GD	Pts
Ghana	4	2	1	1	4	3	+1	7
Angola	4	2	0	2	4	4	0	6
Zimbabwe	4	1	1	2	3	4	−1	4
Sudan (W)	0	0	0	0	0	0	0	0

(W) Withdrew
6 October 1996

Ghana	2–1	Angola
Aboagye 7'; Kim Grant 30'		Paulão 2'

Accra Sports Stadium, Accra
Attendance: 34,000
Referee: Jean-Fidèle Diramba (Gabon)

26 January 1997

Zimbabwe	0–0	Ghana

National Sports Stadium, Harare
Attendance: 45,000
Referee: Jean-Fidèle Diramba (Gabon)

23 February 1997

Zimbabwe	1–0	Angola
Mugeyi 31' (pen.)

National Sports Stadium, Harare
Attendance: 45,000

22 June 1997

Angola	1–0	Ghana
Akwá 23'

Estádio da Cidadela, Luanda
Attendance: 10,000

13 July 1997

Ghana	2–1	Zimbabwe
Pele 22'; Kuffour 39'		Muradzikwa 24'

Accra Sports Stadium, Accra
Attendance: 40,000
Referee: Ousseynou Dieng (Ivory Coast)

27 July 1997

Angola	2–1	Zimbabwe
Aurélio 9'; Akwá 70'		Murisa 80'

Estádio da Cidadela, Luanda
Attendance: 32,000

==== Group 2 ====
Team	Pld	W	D	L	GF	GA	GD	Pts
Ivory Coast	6	4	1	1	10	8	+2	13
Algeria	6	3	1	2	9	5	+4	10
Mali	6	3	0	3	9	9	0	9
Benin	6	0	2	4	3	9	−6	2

6 October 1996

Algeria	4–1	Ivory Coast
Meçabih 7', 9'; Saïb 41', 89'	Report	Tiéhi 71'

5 July Stadium, Algiers
Attendance: 20,000
Referee: Sidi Bekaye Magassa (Mali)
6 October 1996

Benin	1–2	Mali
Latoundji 38'		Touré 54'; B. Traoré 78'

Stade de l'Amitié, Cotonou
Attendance: 40,000

26 January 1997

Ivory Coast	1–0	Benin
Guel 12'

Stade Bouaké, Bouaké
Attendance: 20,000
26 January 1997

Mali	1–0	Algeria
Touré 63'	Report

Stade Modibo Kéïta, Bamako
Attendance: 40,000
Referee: Falla Ndoye (Senegal)

23 February 1997

Benin	1–1	Algeria
Latoundji 35'	Report	Tasfaout 51'

Stade de l'Amitié, Cotonou
Attendance: 15,000
23 February 1997

Mali	1–2	Ivory Coast
Sidibé 14'		Bakayoko 13'; Tiéhi 22'

Stade Modibo Kéïta, Bamako
Attendance: 30,000
Referee: Abderrahim El Arjoun (Morocco)

22 June 1997

Ivory Coast	2–1	Algeria
Tiéhi 45'; Bassole 87'	Report	Dziri 17'

Stade Bouaké, Bouaké
Attendance: 20,000
Referee: Emmanuel Okoampah (Ghana)
22 June 1997

Mali	3–1	Benin
Touré 12'; Dissa 68'; Traoré 85' (pen.)		Keita 40'

Stade Modibo Kéïta, Bamako
Attendance: 20,000
Referee: Ibrahim Djingarey Amadou (Niger)

13 July 1997

Algeria	1–0	Mali
Kherris 18'	Report

5 July Stadium, Algiers
Attendance: 40,000
Referee: Lucien Bouchardeau (Niger)
13 July 1997

Benin	0–0	Ivory Coast

Stade de l'Amitié, Cotonou
Attendance: 25,000

27 July 1997

Algeria	2–0	Benin
Tasfaout 13'; Benzerga 27'	Report

5 July Stadium, Algiers
Attendance: 20,000
Referee: Abderrahim El Arjoun (Morocco)
27 July 1997

Ivory Coast	4–2	Mali
Tiéhi 22', 26'; Guel 51'; Bakayoko 75'		Coulibaly 47'; Sidibé 69'

Stade Bouaké, Bouaké
Attendance: 10,000

==== Group 3 ====
Team	Pld	W	D	L	GF	GA	GD	Pts
Morocco	6	4	2	0	10	1	+9	14
Egypt	6	2	3	1	12	4	+8	9
Senegal	6	2	2	2	5	6	−1	8
Ethiopia	6	0	1	5	3	19	−16	1

4 October 1996

Egypt	1–1	Morocco
H.Hassan 88'		Bassir 74'

Cairo International Stadium, Cairo
Attendance: 50,000
6 October 1996

Ethiopia	1–2	Senegal
Juhar 3'		Diandy 17'; A. Keita 36'

Addis Ababa Stadium, Addis Ababa
Attendance: 25,000

25 January 1997

Senegal	0–0	Egypt

Stade Léopold Sédar Senghor, Dakar
Attendance: 50,000
Referee: Camara Ba (Guinea)

22 February 1997

Senegal	0–0	Morocco

Stade Léopold Sédar Senghor, Dakar
Attendance: 30,000
Referee: Mohamed Kouradji (Algeria)
23 February 1997

Ethiopia	1–1	Egypt
Tesfaye 58'		Tarek 71'

Addis Ababa Stadium, Addis Ababa
Attendance: 25,000

31 May 1997

Morocco	4–0	Ethiopia
Chiba 8'; Bahja 18'; Naybet 34'; El Hadrioui 81'

Moulay Abdellah Stadium, Rabat
Attendance: 30,000
Referee: Mahmoud Hosni (Tunisia)

21 June 1997

Morocco	1–0	Egypt
Bassir 71'

Moulay Abdellah Stadium, Rabat
Attendance: 80,000
Referee: Sidi Bekaye Megassa (Mali)
22 June 1997

Senegal	3–0	Ethiopia
Sané 38', 53'; O. Traoré 68'

Stade Léopold Sédar Senghor, Dakar
Attendance: 28,000

13 July 1997

Egypt	2–0	Senegal
Emam; Khashaba

Cairo International Stadium, Cairo
Attendance: 35,000
13 July 1997

Ethiopia	0–1	Morocco
		Bassir 21'

Addis Ababa Stadium, Addis Ababa
Attendance: 20,000

27 July 1997

Egypt	8–1	Ethiopia
Khashaba 1'; Hanafy 5'; Emam 19', 36', 44'; H.Hassan 55'; A.Hassan 62'; El-Sayed 77'		S. Elias 60'

Alexandria Stadium, Alexandria
Attendance: 20,000
27 July 1997

Morocco	3–0	Senegal
Bassir 11', 67'; Chiba 40'

Moulay Abdellah Stadium, Rabat
Attendance: 20,000
Referee: Mamadouba Camara (Guinea)

==== Group 4 ====
Central African Republic were disqualified on 30 January 1997 after the government refused to allow their squad to travel for a match in Sierra Leone on 25 January. Their results were annulled.
Due to the civil war, Sierra Leone withdrew two matches before the end of the tournament, but their results stood.

Team	Pld	W	D	L	GF	GA	GD	Pts
Tunisia	3	2	0	1	3	1	+2	6
Guinea	3	2	0	1	2	1	+1	6
Sierra Leone (W)	2	0	0	2	0	3	−3	0
Central African Republic (D)	0	0	0	0	0	0	0	0

(D) Disqualified; (W) Withdrew
6 October 1996

Tunisia	2–0	Sierra Leone
S.Trabelsi 29'; Souayah 69'

Stade de Sousse, Sousse
Referee: Said Belqola (Morocco)
6 October 1996

Central African Republic	2–3 Annulled	Guinea
Matondo 30'; Azo 48' (pen.)		Soumah 27', 89'; Kéita 85'

National Stadium, Bangui
Attendance: 15,000

26 January 1997

Guinea	1–0	Tunisia
Sow 49' (pen.)

Stade 28 Septembre, Conakry
Attendance: 50,000
Referee: Lucien Bouchardeau (Niger)

23 February 1997

Guinea	1–0	Sierra Leone
F. Camara 67'

Stade 28 Septembre, Conakry
Attendance: 25,000
Referee: Moussa Kanouté (Mali)

13 July 1997

Tunisia	1–0	Guinea
Jelassi 90'

Stade El Menzah, Tunis
Attendance: 25,000

==== Group 5 ====
Team	Pld	W	D	L	GF	GA	GD	Pts
Cameroon	6	2	4	0	8	3	+5	10
Namibia	6	2	2	2	4	7	−3	8
Gabon	6	1	4	1	5	5	0	7
Kenya	6	1	2	3	2	4	−2	5

6 October 1996

Namibia	1–0	Kenya
F. Oduor (o.g.)

Independence Stadium, Windhoek
Attendance: 15,000
6 October 1996

Gabon	0–0	Cameroon

Stade Omar Bongo, Libreville
Attendance: 11,000

25 January 1997

Kenya	1–0	Gabon
Mururi 70'

Moi International Sports Centre, Nairobi
Attendance: 35,000
26 January 1997

Cameroon	4–0	Namibia
M'Boma 3', 85'; Missé-Missé 35', 48'

Stade Omnisports, Yaoundé
Attendance: 40,000

22 February 1997

Kenya	0–0	Cameroon

Moi International Sports Centre, Nairobi
Attendance: 40,000
22 February 1997

Namibia	1–1	Gabon
Van Wyk 86'		Aubameyang 19' (pen.)

Independence Stadium, Windhoek
Attendance: 15,000

21 June 1997

Kenya	0–1	Namibia
		Uri Khob 35'

Moi International Sports Centre, Nairobi
Attendance: 20,000
22 June 1997

Cameroon	2–2	Gabon
Tchoutang 12'; Mangan 33'		Maya 38' (pen.); Bakogo 87'

Stade Omnisports, Yaoundé
Attendance: 60,000

12 July 1997

Namibia	0–1	Cameroon
		Tchango

Independence Stadium, Windhoek
Attendance: 10,000
Referee: Felix Tangawarima (Zimbabwe)
13 July 1997

Gabon	1–0	Kenya
Nguema 50'

Stade Omar Bongo, Libreville
Attendance: 45,000

27 July 1997

Cameroon	1–1	Kenya
Moreau 89' (pen.)		Were 49'

Stade Omnisports, Yaoundé
Attendance: 30,000
Referee: Sidi Bekaye Megassa (Mali)
27 July 1997

Gabon	1–1	Namibia
Aubameyang 22' (pen.)		Hindjou 60' (pen.)

Stade Omar Bongo, Libreville
Attendance: 20,000

==== Group 6 ====
During the tournament, the country of Zaire was renamed DR Congo.

Team	Pld	W	D	L	GF	GA	GD	Pts
Togo	6	3	1	2	9	5	+4	10
DR Congo	6	2	3	1	6	5	+1	9
Liberia	6	2	2	2	5	8	−3	8
Tanzania	6	1	2	3	5	7	−2	5

5 October 1996

Togo	2–1	Tanzania
T. Salou 17'; Abalo 57'		Samieh 72'

Stade Municipal (Lomé), Lomé
Attendance: 20,000
6 October 1996

Zaire	0–0	Liberia

Stade Kamanyola, Kinshasa
Attendance: 75,000

26 January 1997

Tanzania	1–2	Zaire
Kizito 79'		Mbayo 52'; Kayu 85'

National Stadium, Dar es Salaam
Attendance: 12,000
26 January 1997

Liberia	1–2	Togo
Sogbie 24'		B. Salou 26'; Assignon 67'

Accra Sports Stadium, Accra (neutral ground)
Attendance: 10,000
Referee: Emmanuel Okoampah (Ghana)

23 February 1997

Tanzania	1–1	Liberia
Saidi 75'		Sogbie 27'

National Stadium, Dar es Salaam
Attendance: 10,000
23 February 1997

Togo	1–1	Zaire
Noutsoudje 90'		Simba 26'

Stade Municipal (Lomé), Lomé
Attendance: 20,000
Referee: Yahya Hadqa (Morocco)

22 June 1997

Tanzania	1–0	Togo
Amlima 31'

Sheikh Amri Abeid Memorial Stadium, Arusha
Attendance: 10,000
22 June 1997

Liberia	2–1	DR Congo
Sebwe 20'; Weah 66'		Nzalambila 81'

Samuel Kanyon Doe Stadium, Monrovia
Attendance: 45,000

13 July 1997

Togo	4–0	Liberia
T. Salou 52'; Noutsoudje 86'; Assignon 89'; B. Salou 90'

Stade Municipal (Lomé), Lomé
Attendance: 20,000
13 July 1997

DR Congo	1–1	Tanzania

Stade Kamanyola, Kinshasa
Attendance: 25,000

27 July 1997

Liberia	1–0	Tanzania
Zizi Roberts 54'

Samuel Kanyon Doe Stadium, Monrovia
Attendance: 20,000
27 July 1997

DR Congo	1–0	Togo
Kidoda 15'

Stade Kamanyola, Kinshasa
Attendance: 60,000
Referee: Edwin Senai (Botswana)

==== Group 7 ====
Team	Pld	W	D	L	GF	GA	GD	Pts
Zambia	6	4	2	0	9	3	+6	14
Mozambique	6	3	1	2	10	7	+3	10
Malawi	6	3	0	3	9	10	−1	9
Mauritius	6	0	1	5	4	12	−8	1

6 October 1996

Mauritius	1–2	Malawi
Rateau 75'		Mpinganjira 29'; Jonas 90' (o.g.)

Stade Anjalay, Port Louis
Attendance: 16,000
6 October 1996

Zambia	1–0	Mozambique
Malitoli 4'

Independence Stadium, Lusaka
Attendance: 30,000

25 January 1997

Malawi	0–2	Zambia
		Tana 40'; Tembo 83'

Chichiri Stadium, Blantyre
Attendance: 40,000
Referee: Felix Tangawarima (Zimbabwe)
26 January 1997

Mozambique	3–0	Mauritius
Chiquinho Conde 55'; Faife 62'; Macamo 65'

Estádio da Machava, Maputo
Attendance: 30,000

22 February 1997

Malawi	2–0	Mozambique
Maduka 6'; Kamanga 60'

Chichiri Stadium, Blantyre
Attendance: 60,000
23 February 1997

Mauritius	0–0	Zambia

Stade Anjalay, Port Louis
Attendance: 15,000

21 June 1997

Malawi	3–2	Mauritius
Maduka 19', 81'; Banda 76'		Philogène 87'; Pierre-Louis 89'

Silver Stadium, Lilongwe
Attendance: 30,000
22 June 1997

Mozambique	2–2	Zambia
Tico-Tico 11'; Chiquinho Conde 62' (pen.)		Kamwandi 15'; Tembo 57'

Estádio da Machava, Maputo
Attendance: 25,000

12 July 1997

Zambia	3–1	Malawi
Chilombo 30' (pen.); Kamwandi 55'; Mwila 75'		Banda 89'

Independence Stadium, Lusaka
Attendance: 35,000
13 July 1997

Mauritius	1–3	Mozambique
Appou 65'		Chiquinho Conde 6'; Nuro 33'; Tico-Tico 89'

Stade Anjalay, Port Louis
Attendance: 12,000

27 July 1997

Mozambique	2–1	Malawi
Pinto Barros 85'; Tico-Tico 88'		Nkhwazi 62'

Estádio da Machava, Maputo
Attendance: 35,000
27 July 1997

Zambia	1–0	Mauritius
Mutale 57'

Konkola Stadium, Chililabombwe
Attendance: 20,000

== Qualified teams ==
- Algeria
- Angola
- Burkina Faso (hosts)
- Cameroon
- DR Congo
- Ivory Coast
- Egypt
- Ghana
- Guinea
- Morocco
- Mozambique
- Namibia
- South Africa (holders)
- Togo
- Tunisia
- Zambia
