= Bobby Samaria =

Namibian footballer

Personal information
- Date of birth: 21 February 1970 (age 56)
- Place of birth: Grootfontein, South West Africa
- Position: Midfielder

Youth career
- Chief Santos

Senior career*
Years	Team	Apps	(Gls)
- Eleven Arrows
- Black Africa

International career
1994–1999	Namibia	11	(1)

Managerial career
- –2006: Black Africa
- Namibia U20
- 2008–2012: African Stars
- 2012–2015: United Africa Tigers
- 2015–2018: African Stars
- 2018–2019: African Stars
- 2019–2021: Namibia
Medal record
Men's football
Representing Namibia
COSAFA Cup
Runner-up	1999 Southern Africa
- * Club domestic league appearances and goals

Bobby Samaria (born 21 February 1970) is a Namibian football manager and former player.

== Playing career ==
Born in Grootfontein, Samaria began his career in the youth ranks of Chief Santos. At the age of 17, Samaria made his senior footballing debut for Eleven Arrows. After four years at Eleven Arrows, Samaria joined Windhoek-based side Black Africa, winning the Player of the Year award in 1993.

Internationally, Samaria made eleven appearances for Namibia, scoring once in a 2–1 win against Malawi on 1 August 1998.

== Managerial career ==
Following his retirement from football, Samaria took up the managerial role at former club Black Africa. On 27 February 2006, Samaria resigned from the club, whilst still managing the Namibia under-20 side. In 2008, Samaria was appointed manager of African Stars. Samaria helped African Stars to win the 2008–09 and 2009–10 editions of the Namibia Premier League, as well as the 2010 Namibia FA Cup. In 2012, Samaria joined United Africa Tigers, winning the Namibia Super Cup, before returning to African Stars in 2015. In 2018, African Stars achieved the double of the Namibia Premier League and Namibia Super Cup. At the end of the 2018–19 season, Samaria left the club, with former Namibian international Robert Nauseb replacing him. In December 2018, following Nauseb's sacking, Samaria was re-appointed by African Stars. In 2019, Samaria was appointed by Namibia to manage the country during the 2020 African Nations Championship qualification.

== Career statistics ==
Score and result list Namibia's goal tally first, score column indicates score after Samaria goal.

International goal scored by Bobby Samaria
No.	Date	Venue	Opponent	Score	Result	Competition
1	1 August 1998	Sam Nujoma Stadium, Windhoek, Namibia	Malawi	1–0	2–1	2000 Africa Cup of Nations qualification

== Honours ==
Namibia

- COSAFA Cup: Runner-up, 1999
