= Johannes Hindjou =

Namibian footballer

Personal information
- Full name: Johannes Ngumeritiza Hindjou
- Date of birth: 8 November 1976 (age 49)
- Place of birth: Okahandja
- Position: Midfielder

Youth career
- 1993: Morocco City Stars
- 1994: Golden Arrows

Senior career*
| Years | Team | Apps | (Gls) |
| 1994-2001 | Liverpool | | |
| 2002 | Black Leopards | | |
| 2002-2006 | Civics | | |
| 2007 | African Stars | | |

International career
| 1996–2006 | Namibia | 69 | (10) |

Managerial career
- Spoilers
- 2009-2011: Eleven Arrows
Medal record
Men's football
Representing Namibia
COSAFA Cup
| Runner-up | 1997 Southern Africa |
| Runner-up | 1999 Southern Africa |
- * Club domestic league appearances and goals

Johannes Hindjou (born 8 November 1976) is a Namibian retired footballer who played as a midfielder.

== Club career ==
Born on a small farm outside Okahandja, Hindjou played for local side Liverpool Okahandja, Civics—winning the Namibia Premier League with both clubs—before retiring in 2007 after a spell with African Stars. Nicknamed Congo, he had joined hometown club Liverpool in September 1994, where he played alongside the likes of fellow internationals Bimbo Tjihero, Erastus Gariseb and Silvanus Njambari and under the guidance of brothers Albert and Jamanuka Tjihero.

He later coached Okahandja Spoilers and Eleven Arrows.

== International career ==
He was capped 66 times and scored 10 goals for the Namibia national football team, including a stint at the 1998 African Cup of Nations. He had made his debut away against Botswana in August 1996.

Scores and results list Namibia's goal tally first, score column indicates score after each Hindjou goal.

List of international goals scored by Johannes Hindjou
| No. | Date | Venue | Opponent | Score | Result | Competition | Ref. |
|---|---|---|---|---|---|---|---|
| 1 | 25 August 1996 | Independence Stadium, Windhoek, Namibia | Botswana | 5-0 | 6-0 | 1998 African Cup of Nations qualification | |
| 2 | 25 August 1996 | Independence Stadium, Windhoek, Namibia | Botswana | 6-0 | 6-0 | 1998 African Cup of Nations qualification | |
| 3 | 16 March 1997 | Independence Stadium, Windhoek, Namibia | Zimbabwe | 1-1 | 2-1 | 1997 COSAFA Cup qualification | |
| 4 | 16 March 1997 | Independence Stadium, Windhoek, Namibia | Zimbabwe | 2-1 | 2-1 | 1997 COSAFA Cup qualification | |
| 5 | 28 June 1997 | Independence Stadium, Windhoek, Namibia | Malawi | 3-0 | 4-1 | 1997 COSAFA Cup | |
| 6 | 27 July 1997 | Stade Omar Bongo, Libreville, Gabon | Gabon | 1-1 | 1-1 | 1998 African Cup of Nations qualification | |
| 7 | 8 August 1998 | Independence Stadium, Lusaka, Zambia | Zambia | 1-1 | 1-1 | 1998 COSAFA Cup | |
| 8 | 31 July 1999 | Independence Stadium, Windhoek, Namibia | South Africa | 1-1 | 1-1 | 1999 COSAFA Cup | |
| 9 | 13 January 2001 | Independence Stadium, Windhoek, Namibia | Madagascar | 1-2 | 2-2 | 2002 African Cup of Nations qualification | |
| 10 | 20 September 2003 | Independence Stadium, Windhoek, Namibia | Angola | 1-2 | 1-3 | Friendly | |

== Personal life ==
Hindjou was born to Eva and Pikiro Hindjou and had business interests in the fishing and construction industries. He also was vice-president of the Namibia Football Players Union (NAFPU), with former national teammate Silvester Goraseb acting as president. He served several terms as mayor of Okahandja, after he got more interested in politics when he became a member of SWAPO. He was suspended as mayor due to claims of alleged corruption.

== Honours ==
Namibia

- COSAFA Cup: Runner-up, 1997, 1999
