= Simon Uutoni =

Namibian footballer

Personal information
- Date of birth: 2 October 1970 (age 56)
- Place of birth: Tsumeb, South West Africa
- Position: Wingback

Youth career
- Young Benfica
- Monaco

Senior career*
Years	Team	Apps	(Gls)
1991-2000	Liverpool Okahandja		
2001-2004	Oshakati City		

International career
1997–2000	Namibia	23	(3)
Medal record
Men's football
Representing Namibia
COSAFA Cup
Runner-up	1997 Southern Africa
Runner-up	1999 Southern Africa
- * Club domestic league appearances and goals

Simon Uutoni (born 10 February 1970) is a Namibian retired footballer.

== Club career ==
Born in Tsumeb, Uutoni grew up in the Nomtsoub neighborhood and played in the Benfica and Monaco youth teams before he started playing as a wing back for Namibia Premier League side Liverpool Okahandja.

== International career ==
Nicknamed China, Uutoni competed for the Namibia national football team from 1997–1998, including the 1998 African Cup of Nations finals. He made his debut for the Brave Warriors in an April 1997 World Cup qualification match against Tunisia, and totalled 3 goals in 23 games for them.

== Personal life ==
After retiring as a player in 2004, he worked in the construction business in northern Namibia. He was an ambassador of the 2016 COSAFA Cup alongside former national teammate Johannes Hindjou. Uutoni is a father of seven children.

== Career statistics ==
=== International ===
Scores and results list Namibia's goal tally first, score column indicates score after each Uutoni goal.

List of international goals scored by Simon Uutoni
No.	Date	Venue	Opponent	Score	Result	Competition
1	26 April 1997	Independence Stadium, Windhoek, Namibia	Egypt	1–0	2–3	1998 FIFA World Cup qualification
2	16 February 1998	Stade Omnisports, Bobo-Dioulasso, Burkina Faso	South Africa	1–4	1–4	1998 Africa Cup of Nations
3	22 May 1999	Kamuzu Stadium, Blantyre, Malawi	Malawi	1–0	1–1 (4–2 p)	1999 COSAFA Cup

== Honours ==
Liverpool Okahandja

- NFA Cup: 1992

Namibia

- COSAFA Cup: Runner-up, 1997, 1999
