= Gervatius Uri Khob =

Namibian footballer

Gervatius Uri-Khob
Personal information
- Date of birth: 3 April 1972 (age 54)
- Place of birth: Tsumeb, South West Africa
- Position: Forward

Youth career
- Young Ones

Senior career*
Years	Team	Apps	(Gls)
1985-2005	Chief Santos		

International career
1993–2003	Namibia	47	(11)
Medal record
Men's football
Representing Namibia
COSAFA Cup
Runner-up	1997 Southern Africa
Runner-up	1999 Southern Africa
- * Club domestic league appearances and goals

Gervatius Uri-Khob (born 3 April 1972) is a retired Namibian footballer.

== Club career ==
Uri-Khob grew up in the Tsumeb neighborhood of Nomtsoub. A free-kick specialist, the bow-legged forward made his senior debut for local side Chief Santos aged 13 and playing alongside veterans such as Engel Johnson, Khulu Geingob, Jan Xamiseb and Steven Auchumeb.

== International career ==
Nicknamed Gerros the Bomber for his ferocious shooting, the prolific striker competed for the Namibia national football team from 1993 to 2003, including the 1998 African Cup of Nations, where he scored two goals in a 3–3 draw with Angola. He made his debut for the Brave Warriors in a January 1993 World Cup qualification match against Zambia and totalled 11 goals in 47 games for them.

Appearances and goals by national team and year
National team	Year	Apps	Goals
Namibia	1992	1	0
Namibia	1993	1	0
Namibia	1995	1	0
Namibia	1996	6	2
Namibia	1997	15	3
Namibia	1998	9	3
Namibia	1999	5	1
Namibia	2001	1	2
Namibia	2003	2	0
Total		41	11

Scores and results list Namibia's goal tally first, score column indicates score after each Khob goal.

List of international goals scored by Gervatius Uri Khob
No.	Date	Venue	Opponent	Score	Result	Competition	Ref.
1	16 June 1996	Estádio da Machava, Matola, Mozambique	Mozambique	1–1	1–1	1998 FIFA World Cup qualification	
2	25 August 1996	Independence Stadium, Windhoek, Namibia	Botswana	2–0	6–0	1998 African Cup of Nations qualification	
3	8 June 1997	Samuel Kanyon Doe Sports Complex, Paynesville, Liberia	Liberia	2–1	2–1	1998 FIFA World Cup qualification	
4	21 June 1997	Moi International Sports Centre, Kasarani, Kenya	Kenya	1–0	1–0	1998 African Cup of Nations qualification	
5	28 June 1997	Independence Stadium, Windhoek, Namibia	Malawi	1–0	4–1	1997 COSAFA Cup	
6	12 February 1998	Stade Général Aboubacar Sangoulé Lamizana, Bobo-Dioulasso, Burkina Faso	Angola	1–0	3–3	1998 African Cup of Nations	
7	12 February 1998	Stade Général Aboubacar Sangoulé Lamizana, Bobo-Dioulasso, Burkina Faso	Angola	3–1	3–3	1998 African Cup of Nations	
8	19 April 1998	National Sports Stadium, Harare, Zimbabwe	Zimbabwe	1–3	2–5	1998 COSAFA Cup	
9	11 April 1994	Stade Modibo Kéïta, Bamako, Mali	Mali	1–0	1–2	2000 African Cup of Nations qualification	
10	15 December 2001	Botswana National Stadium, Gaborone, Botswana	Botswana	1—?	2–3	Friendly	
11	15 December 2001	Botswana National Stadium, Gaborone, Botswana	Botswana	2—?	2–3	Friendly	

== Personal life ==
Uri-Khob runs a football academy with his wife Yolande, and the couple has three sons. He also works as a liquid fuel dispenser technician. His nephews Marcellus Witbeen and Ricardo Witbeen also played for the national team.

== Honours ==
Chief Santos

- NFA Cup: 1991, 1998, 1999, 2000

Namibia

- COSAFA Cup: Runner-up, 1997, 1999
