= Roman Geoffrey =

Namibian footballer

Personal information
- Full name: Roman Brown Geoffrey
- Date of birth: February 26, 1982 (age 44)
- Place of birth: Karasburg, South West Africa
- Height: 6 ft 0 in (1.83 m)
- Position: Striker

Team information
- Current team: Ramblers F.C.
- Number: 21

Senior career*
Years	Team	Apps	(Gls)
1998–2000	Orlando Pirates F.C. Windhoek		
2001–2003	African Stars F.C.		
2003	Germania Dattenfeld		
2003/2004	Duisburg II		
2004/2005	Oberhausen II	7	(1)
2005–2007	Germania Dattenfeld		
2007	F.C. Civics		
2008–	Ramblers F.C.		

International career
1997–2003	Namibia U-17	8	(0)
1999–2001	Namibia U-19	7	(0)
1999–2003	Namibia	12	(0)
Medal record
Men's football
Representing Namibia
COSAFA Cup
Runner-up	1999 Southern Africa
- * Club domestic league appearances and goals

Roman Brown Geoffrey (born 26 February 1982 in Karasburg, ǁKaras Region) is a Namibian international footballer with Ramblers F.C.

== Professional career ==
- Orlando Pirates F.C. Windhoek (1998–2000)
- African Stars F.C. (2001–2003)
- Germania Dattenfeld (2003)
- MSV Duisburg (2003/2004)
- Rot-Weiß Oberhausen (2004/2005)

== International career ==
Geoffrey is former member of the Namibia national football team. Geoffrey has 12 caps with the Brave Warriors senior squad.

== Honours ==
Namibia

- COSAFA Cup: Runner-up, 1999
