= Rodney Doeseb =

Namibian footballer

Personal information
- Full name: Rodney Wallace Doeseb
- Date of birth: 10 September 1977 (age 49)
- Position: Defender

Senior career*
Years	Team	Apps	(Gls)
1997–2005	Chief Santos		
2005–2006	Eleven Arrows		

International career
1999–2001	Namibia	18	(0)
Medal record
Men's football
Representing Namibia
COSAFA Cup
Runner-up	1999 Southern Africa
- * Club domestic league appearances and goals

Rodney Wallace Doeseb (born 10 September 1977) is a retired Namibian football defender.

== Honours ==
Namibia

- COSAFA Cup: Runner-up, 1999
