= Petrus Haraseb =

Namibian footballer

Personal information
- Full name: Petrus Orlando Haraseb
- Date of birth: 1 June 1968 (age 58)
- Place of birth: Klein-Naoas, South West Africa
- Position: Defender

Senior career*
Years	Team	Apps	(Gls)
1983–1985	Pubs Outjo		
1986–1988	Orlando Pirates Windhoek		
1989	SWAPol		
1990–1992	NamPol		
1993–1996	Orlando Pirates Windhoek		
1997–1998	Liverpool Okahandja		
1999	Chief Santos		
2000	Young Ones		

International career
1992–1998	Namibia	33	(1)
Medal record
Men's football
Representing Namibia
COSAFA Cup
Runner-up	1997 Southern Africa
- * Club domestic league appearances and goals

Petrus Orlando Haraseb (born 1 June 1968) is a Namibian retired footballer. He played as a defender.

== Club career ==
Haraseb was born in Klein-Naoas, near Dordabis but relocated with his parents to Erwee, in the Kunene Region. He played for NamPol, Pubs, Orlando Pirates Windhoek, Liverpool Okahandja, Chief Santos and Young Ones.

== International career ==
Haraseb competed for the Namibia national football team from 1992–1998, including the 1998 African Cup of Nations. He made his debut for the Brave Warriors in an October 1992 World Cup qualification match against Zambia and totalled 1 goal in 33 games for them.

== Personal life ==
After retiring, Haraseb worked as a tour guide in the Kunene Region and currently owns a touring company in Swakopmund.

== Honours ==
Namibia

- COSAFA Cup: Runner-up, 1997
