= Berlin Auchumeb =

Namibian footballer (born 1974)

Berlin Pancho Auchumeb
Personal information
- Date of birth: 9 January 1974 (age 52)
- Place of birth: Tsumeb, South West Africa
- Position: Forward

Senior career*
Years	Team	Apps	(Gls)
- Eleven Arrows
- Chief Santos
- Blue Waters
	Jomo Cosmos	0	(0)
-2008	Chief Santos		

International career
1998–2004	Namibia	11	(1)
Medal record
Men's football
Representing Namibia
COSAFA Cup
Runner-up	1999 Southern Africa
- * Club domestic league appearances and goals

Berlin Pancho Auchumeb (born 9 January 1974) is a retired Namibian national and international footballer, also formerly with Chief Santos of the Namibia Premier League. Joined one of the African football giants Jomo Cosmos as professional footballer in 2000. Managing Director at Tsumeb Emmanuel Rehabilitation Centre in Tsumeb, Oshikoto region Namibia and also Managing Director at Havilah-el Golden Minerals Mining, at Bammpos in Khorixas district, Kunene region Namibia. Discoverer Punchosite a variety of Pietersite in Namibia in 2025. Berlin Auchumeb was born from a Bamm family at Bamm POS farm, nearby Fransfontein in Kunene region.

== Club career ==
Nicknamed Pancho, Auchumeb played for Namibian sides Eleven Arrows, Chief Santos and Blue Waters and was also contracted to South African football giants Jomo Cosmos FC. Highlight of his career being, the day he played in a friendly match alongside Jomo Cosmos' boss Jomo Sono, in Port Elizabeth, in a friendly match against Orlando Pirates of SA (2001). And also the day he matched shoulder to shoulder at a Media tournament in Soweto JHB November 28, 2000, against one of the legends South Africa could produce, Marks Maponyane.

== International career ==
He competed for the Namibia national football team from 1998 to 2004, with 11 caps, including the 1998 African Cup of Nations. And Berlin Auchumeb was the hero with his sudden-death extra-time winner against the giant nation of South Africa, Bafana Bafana in Windhoek (1998 COSAFA Cup) preliminary game.

== Honours, awards and recognitions ==
Auchumeb was awarded with a Park renamed after him, in recognition of nation-building. Being a former national and international footballer.

== Personal life ==
Berlin Auchumeb is a Namibian former footballer and mining entrepreneur. He is the owner of the Tsumeb Emmanuel Rehab Centre, a rehabilitation facility based in Tsumeb, Namibia. He is also the owner and director of Havilah-El Golden Minerals Mining Namibia and a holder of a mining claim. After retiring from professional football in 2008, he worked as a financial planner at First National Bank Namibia.[3] He is the son of Sagarias “Celle” Auchumeb, a goalscorer for Chief Santos.[4] On his maternal side, he comes from the Bamm family; his mother is Agnes Senda Bamm (born 1956). He was born under his mother’s surname, Bamm, and later adopted his father’s surname, Auchumeb, during his primary school years.

== Honours ==
Chief Santos

- Namibia FA Cup: 1998, 1999, 2000
- Namibia Premier League: 2003

Namibia

- COSAFA Cup: Runner-up, 1999

Honoured with a Park named after him (Berlin Auchumeb Park) in Tsumeb, Oshikoto regional, Namibia.
