= Uutoni =

Uutoni is a Namibian surname. Notable people with the surname include:

- Erastus Uutoni (born 1961), Namibian politician
- Japhet Uutoni (born 1979), Namibian boxer
- Simon Uutoni (born 1970), Namibian footballer
