= Eliphas Shivute =

Namibian footballer

Personal information
- Full name: Eliphas Kambuta Shivute
- Date of birth: September 27, 1974 (age 52)
- Place of birth: Olukonda, South-West Africa
- Height: 6 ft 1 in (1.85 m)
- Position: Forward

Senior career*
Years	Team	Apps	(Gls)
1989–1990	Blue Waters		
1990–1991	Eleven Arrows		
1996	Schwarz-Weiß Düren		
1997	Alemannia Aachen	0	(0)
1997–1999	Motherwell	24	(3)
1999–2001	Dalian Wanda FC	24	(5)
2000	→ Eleven Arrows (loan)		
2001	→ Shenzhen Ping'an Kejian (loan)	17	(4)
2001–2002	Čukarički	2	(0)

International career
1992–2001	Namibia	42	(10)
Medal record
Men's football
Representing Namibia
COSAFA Cup
Runner-up	1997 Southern Africa
Runner-up	1999 Southern Africa
- * Club domestic league appearances and goals

Eliphas "Safile" Shivute (born 27 September 1974) is a Namibian retired international footballer.

He retired from football due to a knee injury in 2002 after a career spent in Chinese and European football, as well as domestically. Shivute became the first Namibian to play for a top-level side in Europe, and also, is the man who scored the first international goal for the Brave Warriors.

== Club career ==
Born in Olukonda, Shivute grew up in Kuisebmond, Walvis Bay and, affectionately known as Safile (Elifas spelled backwards), started playing in 1989 for local side Blue Waters, and later Eleven Arrows He then played for German Fifth Division Schwarz-Weiß Düren in 1996, a non-professional side for which he scored over 13 goals in a short spell. When he scored a hat trick for Düren in one of the league matches that the Alemannia Aachen scouts spotted him and immediately entered into negotiations for a contract. This negotiations ended into Safile signing a one-year-contract with Third Division Aachen. Then he had several trials in Scotland, according to the Daily Record Staff, Safile has had trials with Dundee United and Hearts earlier, but Shivute decided to sign for Motherwell

=== Motherwell ===
He scored twice in his trial match for and impressed Motherwell manager Alex McLeish, which Shivute admired because as youngster he followed English and Scottish football through TV and books. His first full match debut in the Scottish Premier League match in a one-all draw against league leaders Hibernians earned him the “Player of the Match” award. Safile had been playing more as a schemer-striker, drifting in and around the box.

He played with Motherwell until 1999 when he moved to China signing with Jia-A League club Dalian Wanda FC in the costliest signing ever by then, £350,000. After one season in 2000 he shortly returned to Namibia playing for half season for his former club Eleven Arrows before moving to another Chinese top league club Shenzhen Ping'an Kejian where he played on loan until December 2001. That winter he returned to Europe having an 8-months spell with Serbian club FK Čukarički playing in the First League of FR Yugoslavia, just before retiring. Later he played a major role in the transfer of Namibian Rudolph Bester to that club. He became the agent of Bester in 2008.

In 2006, he became assistant manager of Namibian Second Division club Invincible FC.

== International career ==
Shivute has been part of the national team since 1992 having earned 49 caps and scored 9 times. With Namibia he was runner-up at 1997 and 1999 COSAFA Cup. He also represented Namibia at the 1998 African Cup of Nations where he scored two goals in a 3-4 loss to Ivory Coast. He made his debut for the Brave Warriors in an October 1992 World Cup qualification match against Madagascar and he totalled 9 goals in 49 games for them.

== Playing style ==
Namibia Today Sport describe him as striker with much improvisation and audacity, a great finisher, and with flair, speed, and shooting power in both foot and he was a good header.

== Personal life ==
After retiring as a player, he became a businessman with interests in the fishing and construction industries.

== Career statistics ==
=== International ===
Scores and results list Namibia's goal tally first, score column indicates score after each Shivute goal.

List of international goals scored by Eliphas Shivute
No.	Date	Venue	Opponent	Score	Result	Competition
1	1 July 1994	Botswana National Stadium, Gaborone, Botswana	Botswana	1–0	1–0	Friendly
2	8 November 1996	Cairo International Stadium, Cairo, Egypt	Egypt	1–3	1–7	1998 FIFA World Cup qualification
3	8 June 1997	Samuel Kanyon Doe Sports Complex, Monrovia, Liberia	Liberia	1–1	1–1	1998 FIFA World Cup qualification
4	28 June 1997	Independence Stadium, Windhoek, Namibia	Malawi	4–0	4–1	1997 COSAFA Cup
5	1 February 1998	Stade Général Seyni Kountché, Niamey, Niger	Burkina Faso	1–?	1–3	Friendly
6	8 February 1998	Stade Général Aboubacar Sangoulé Lamizana, Bobo-Dioulasso, Burkina Faso	Ivory Coast	1–3	3–4	1998 Africa Cup of Nations
7	8 February 1998	Stade Général Aboubacar Sangoulé Lamizana, Bobo-Dioulasso, Burkina Faso	Ivory Coast	3–3	3–4	1998 Africa Cup of Nations
8	12 September 1998	Independence Stadium, Windhoek, Nabimia	Mozambique	2–1	2–1	1998 COSAFA Cup
9	2 October 1999	Independence Stadium, Windhoek, Namibia	Angola	1–1	1–1	1999 COSAFA Cup
10	8 April 2000	Stade Linité, Victoria, Seychelles	Seychelles	1–0	1–1	2002 FIFA World Cup qualification

== Honours ==
=== Player ===
Namibia

- COSAFA Cup: Runner-up, 1997, 1999

=== Individual ===
- Namibian Sportsman of the Year: 1997 (award attributed by Namibia National Sport Council)
