= Robert Nauseb =

Namibian footballer

Personal information
- Full name: Robert Cosmo Nauseb
- Date of birth: 23 August 1974 (age 52)
- Place of birth: Otjiwarongo, South West Africa
- Position: Midfielder

Youth career
- Black Marroko Chiefs

Senior career*
| Years | Team | Apps | (Gls) |
| 1993–1994 | Orlando Pirates | | |
| 1994–1996 | Civics Windhoek | 71 | (8) |
| 1997–2001 | Kaizer Chiefs | 87 | (9) |
| 2001–2002 | Hellenic | 15 | (0) |
| 2002–2003 | Ajax Cape Town | 28 | (2) |
| 2004 | Bloemfontein Celtic | 5 | (0) |
| 2005–2007 | Engen Santos | 44 | (0) |
| 2008–2009 | Ikapa Sporting | | |

International career
| 1997–2007 | Namibia | 57 | (6) |

Managerial career
- 2018: African Stars
- 2019: Eleven Arrows
Medal record
Men's football
Representing Namibia
COSAFA Cup
| Runner-up | 1999 Southern Africa |
- * Club domestic league appearances and goals

Robert Cosmo Nauseb (born 23 August 1974) is a Namibian former professional footballer who played as a midfielder.

== Club career ==
Nicknamed Baggio, Nauseb was born in Otjiwarongo. He played a large part of his career for one of South Africa's biggest soccer clubs Kaizer Chiefs. He started playing football for local side Black Marroko Chiefs before joining capital club Civics Windhoek from Orlando Pirates. He then left Civics for a lengthy spell in South Africa.

He last played for Ikapa Sporting in South Africa.

== International career ==
He was part of the Namibian 1998 African Nations Cup team, who finished bottom in group C in the first round of competition, thus failing to secure qualification for the quarter-finals. He made his debut for the Brave Warriors in a June 1997 World Cup qualification match against Liberia and totalled 6 goals in 59 games for them.

== Managerial career ==
Nauseb was dismissed as manager of African Stars in December 2018 after only 6 matches in charge. In February 2019 he was appointed manager of Eleven Arrows.

== Personal life ==
After retiring as a player, Nauseb worked as a youth coach for Johannesburg side Bidvest Wits. His father Helmuth ‘Yster’ Nauseb also played for Black Marroko Chiefs. His mother is Hedwig-Angela Nauses. His brothers Chris and Milton also played for the national team.

== Career statistics ==
Scores and results list Namibia's goal tally first, score column indicates score after each Nauseb goal.

List of international goals scored by Robert Nauseb
| No. | Date | Venue | Opponent | Score | Result | Competition |
|---|---|---|---|---|---|---|
| 1 | 12 February 1998 | Stade Municipal, Bobo-Dioulasso, Burkina Faso | Angola | 2–1 | 3–3 | 1998 African Cup of Nations |
| 2 | 17 May 1998 | Stade Pierre de Coubertin, Cannes, France | Saudi Arabia | 1–0 | 1–2 | Friendly |
| 3 | 1 August 1998 | Independence Stadium, Windhoek, Namibia | Malawi | 2–1 | 2–1 | 2000 African Cup of Nations qualification |
| 4 | 15 August 1998 | Chichiri Stadium, Blantyre, Malawi | Malawi | 1–0 | 1–0 | 2000 African Cup of Nations qualification |
| 5 | 14 May 2000 | Independence Stadium, Windhoek, Namibia | Zimbabwe | 2–3 | 2–3 | 2000 COSAFA Cup |
| 6 | 15 July 2000 | Independence Stadium, Windhoek, Namibia | Benin | 1–0 | 8–2 | 2002 African Cup of Nations qualification |

== Honours ==
Namibia

- COSAFA Cup runner-up: 1999
