= Silvanus Njambari =

Namibian footballer

Personal information
- Full name: Silvanus Delaja Njambari
- Date of birth: 28 August 1974
- Place of birth: Usakos, South West Africa
- Date of death: 11 January 2003 (aged 28)
- Place of death: Windhoek, Namibia
- Position: Leftback

Youth career
- Black Marroko FC

Senior career*
Years	Team	Apps	(Gls)
1993–1996	Liverpool Okahandja		
1997–2003	Black Africa		

International career
1994–2001	Namibia	27	(1)
Medal record
Men's football
Representing Namibia
COSAFA Cup
Runner-up	1999 Southern Africa
- * Club domestic league appearances and goals

Silvanus Njambari (28 August 1974 – 11 January 2003) was a Namibian footballer.

== Club career ==
Njambari played for Liverpool Okahandja and Black Africa.

== International career ==
Nicknamed Selly, he competed for the Namibia national football team from 1998-2000, including the 1998 African Cup of Nations. He made his debut for the Brave Warriors in a 1994 friendly match against Botswana and totalled 1 goal in 27 games for them.

== Personal life ==
Born in Usakos in the Erongo Region, Njambari was a son of former player Samuel Mannetjie Tjikune and his wife Katrin Oosthuizen-Njambari and he was a brother of another former Liverpool striker, Donald Tjikune.

=== Death ===
Njambari died unexpectedly in 2003, aged only 28. He was found dead in Windhoek and allegedly committed suicide after falling out with his girlfriend.

== Honours ==
Namibia

- COSAFA Cup: Runner-up, 1999
