= Mohammed Ouseb =

Namibian footballer

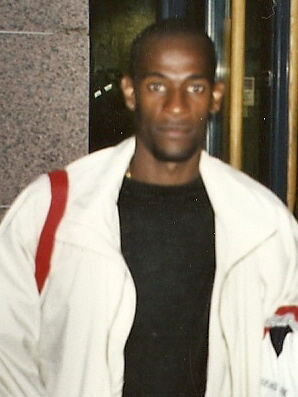

Personal information
- Full name: Mohammed Charles Ouseb
- Date of birth: July 17, 1974 (age 52)
- Place of birth: Tsumeb, South-West Africa
- Height: 1.81 m (5 ft 11 in)
- Position: Defender

Youth career
- African Lions

Senior career*
Years	Team	Apps	(Gls)
1994–1997	Chief Santos		
1998–2001	Kaizer Chiefs	71	(3)
2001–2003	Lyn Oslo	42	(1)
2004–2007	Moroka Swallows	44	(0)
2007–2010	Orlando Pirates Windhoek		

International career
1994–2004	Namibia	66	(3)
Medal record
Men's football
Representing Namibia
COSAFA Cup
Runner-up	1997 Southern Africa
Runner-up	1999 Southern Africa
- * Club domestic league appearances and goals

Mohammed Ouseb (born July 17, 1974 in Tsumeb) is a Namibian footballer.

== Club career ==
Nicknamed 'Slice', Ouseb grew up in the Tsumeb neighborhood of Nomtsoub and played for African Lions before joining boyhood club Chief Santos. He later played for South Africa's Premier Soccer League clubs Kaizer Chiefs, Moroka Swallows and Norway's FC Lyn Oslo as well as Chief Santos in his home country.

== International career ==
He played for the Namibia national football team at the 1998 African Cup of Nations. He made his debut for the Brave Warriors in an October 1994 African Cup of Nations qualification match against Mali and totalled 3 goals in 66 games for them.

== Honours ==
Namibia

- COSAFA Cup: Runner-up, 1997, 1999
