= Sandro de Gouveia =

Namibian footballer

Personal information
- Date of birth: 28 July 1968 (age 58)
- Place of birth: Walvis Bay, South Africa
- Position: Midfielder

Youth career
- Sparta United

Senior career*
Years	Team	Apps	(Gls)
1987-1990	Vasco da Gama		
1990	Cape Town Spurs		
1992	Maritimo		
1992-1998	Blue Waters		

International career
1992–1998	Namibia	31	(1)
Medal record
Men's football
Representing Namibia
COSAFA Cup
Runner-up	1997 Southern Africa
- * Club domestic league appearances and goals

Sandro de Gouveia (born 28 July 1968) is a Namibian retired footballer. He played as a midfielder.

== Club career ==
Born in Walvis Bay, de Gouveia joined Cape Town Spurs from city rivals Vasco da Gama in 1990. He sustained a career-threatening injury in a car crash soon, but after recovering after two years he joined hometown club Maritimo and then Blue Waters with whom he won the league in 1996. He quit playing football in 1998 and became an avid supporter of developing youth football in Namibia.

== International career ==
Nicknamed Jingles, de Gouveia competed for the Namibia national football team from 1996–1998, including the 1998 African Cup of Nations. He made his debut for the Brave Warriors in an October 1992 World Cup qualification match against Madagascar. He was one of only two white players to captain the national team and totaled 1 goal in 31 games for them.

== Personal life ==
De Gouveia works as general manager of Cavema Fishing and has two children with his wife Angelene. With former national teammate Eliphas Shivute he formed the Playtime Trust Namibia, which develops young football and cricket players.

== Honours ==
Blue Waters

- Namibia Premier League: 1996

Namibia

- COSAFA Cup: Runner-up, 1997
