= Steve Tjeenao =

Namibian footballer

Personal information
- Date of birth: 19 January 1980 (age 46)
- Position: Defender

Senior career*
Years	Team	Apps	(Gls)
- Chief Santos
- African Stars

International career
2004–2005	Namibia	4	(0)
- * Club domestic league appearances and goals

Steve Tjeenao (born 19 January 1980) is a retired Namibian football defender.
