= Stanley Goagoseb =

Namibian footballer

Personal information
- Full name: Stanley Lesley Goagoseb
- Date of birth: 7 March 1967 (age 59)
- Place of birth: Windhoek, South West Africa
- Positions: Defender; midfielder

Senior career*
Years	Team	Apps	(Gls)
1984–2003	Civics		

International career
1992–1999	Namibia	38	(1)
Medal record
Men's football
Representing Namibia
COSAFA Cup
Runner-up	1997 Southern Africa
Runner-up	1999 Southern Africa
- * Club domestic league appearances and goals

Stanley Goagoseb (born 7 March 1967) is a Namibian retired footballer who played as a defender or midfielder. He played internationally with Namibia and appeared at the 1998 Africa Cup of Nations. Goagoseb started his career as a midfielder, before transferring to a defender in his later career. He was often known by the nicknames Tiger or Big Cat.

== Early life ==
Goagoseb was born in Windhoek in 1967, but at the age of one, his family was forced to relocate to Katutura. Goagoseb attended multiple schools, including A.I Steenkamp (alongside future national team player and manager Lucky Richter), Jan Jonker Afrikaner High School, Braunfels Boys Boarding School and Ella Du Plessis High School.

== Club career ==
His started his career at Civics in 1984 at the age of 17, where he would remain for the entirety of his career.

== International career ==
He made his debut for Namibia in 1992, as a second-half substitute in a 3–0 defeat to Madagascar.

Goagoseb was part of the Namibia squad at the 1998 Africa Cup of Nations, and made three appearances as Namibia were eliminated in the group stage.

== Personal life ==
Goagoseb retired as a player in 2003 but remained active in football as a youth coach. He worked as a farmer in the Mariental area. He later became a self-made merchandiser in clothes and footwear in Johannesburg. He is divorced and father of seven children.

== Honours ==
Namibia

- COSAFA Cup: Runner-up, 1997, 1999
