= Doeseb =

Doeseb is a surname. Notable people with the surname include:

- Axali Doëseb (1954–2023), Namibian music composer
- Johnny Doeseb (born 1975), Namibian businessperson
- Rodney Doeseb (born 1977), Namibian footballer
