= Bimbo Tjihero =

Namibian footballer

Personal information
- Full name: Lucas Tjihero
- Date of birth: 1 December 1969 (age 56)
- Place of birth: Okahandja, South West Africa
- Position: Forward

Youth career
- Benoni United FC

Senior career*
Years	Team	Apps	(Gls)
- African Stars
1988-2000	Liverpool Okahandja		

International career
1994–1999	Namibia	37	(1)
Medal record
Men's football
Representing Namibia
COSAFA Cup
Runner-up	1997 Southern Africa
Runner-up	1999 Southern Africa
- * Club domestic league appearances and goals

Lucas Tjihero (born 1 December 1969), better known as Bimbo Tjihero, is a Namibian footballer. He played as a defender.

== Club career ==
Also nicknamed Rhoo the Saviour, Tjihero was born in Okahandja and played for Benoni United before moving to Windhoek where he joined African Stars. He returned to his hometown when he formed the Liverpool Okahandja club with his brothers and relocated it to Okahandja.

== International career ==
He competed for the Namibia national team from 1994 to 1999, including the 1998 African Cup of Nations. Tjihero made his debut for the Brave Warriors in a July 1994 friendly match against Botswana and totalled 1 goal in 37 games for them. His goal was a free kick against South Africa, when Namibia stunned their World Cup-bound neighbours during the 1998 COSAFA Cup.

== Personal life ==
His father Festus Tjihero also played football (for Zebras FC) as well as his brothers Albert and Jamanuka (both for African Stars). His mother is Maria Meroro. Tjihero is active as a commercial farmer and also works as a sales manager at the Namibia Broadcasting Corporation. He has three daughters and a son.

== Honours ==
Namibia

- COSAFA Cup: Runner-up, 1997, 1999
