= Ruben Van Wyk =

Namibian footballer

Personal information
- Date of birth: 16 June 1976 (age 50)
- Place of birth: Walvis Bay, South Africa
- Position: Forward

Senior career*
Years	Team	Apps	(Gls)
1994	Orlando Pirates Windhoek		
1997	Liverpool Okahandja		
1999-2000	Black Africa		
2001	Orlando Pirates Windhoek		
2001-2002	Free State Stars	25	(1)
2005	Black Africa		

International career
1994–2002	Namibia	34	(8)
Medal record
Men's football
Representing Namibia
COSAFA Cup
Runner-up	1997 Southern Africa
- * Club domestic league appearances and goals

Ruben Van Wyk (born 16 June 1976) is a retired Namibian footballer.

== Club career ==
Nicknamed Puchy, van Wyk played for Liverpool Okahandja and Black Africa He had a spell in the South African Premier Division with Free State Stars.

== International career ==
He competed for the Namibia national football team from 1992-1998, including the 1998 African Cup of Nations. He made his debut for the Brave Warriors in a September 1994 African Cup of Nations qualification match against Angola and totalled 8 goals in 34 games for them.

== Honours ==
Namibia

- COSAFA Cup: Runner-up, 1997
