= Oscar Norich Stadium =

Sports venue in Tsumeb, Namibia

Coordinates: 19.2501°S 17.6969°E

Oscar Norich Stadium is a sports venue in Tsumeb, Namibia. It is the home stadium of Chief Santos. The stadium is named after Oscar Norich and serves as a vital sports and community hub in Tsumeb.
