= 1997 COSAFA Cup =

Tournament details
- Teams: 9 (from 1 confederation)

Final positions
- Champions: Zambia (1st title)
- Runners-up: Namibia
- Third place: Mozambique
- Fourth place: Tanzania

Tournament statistics
- Matches played: 14
- Goals scored: 45 (3.21 per match)
- Top scorer: (Mozambique) Adelino (4)

This page provides summaries of the 1997 COSAFA Cup, the first edition of the tournament.

Participating nations in 1997 COSAFA Cup: Final round / Qualifying round

== Qualifying round ==
March 1, 1997

Botswana	1 – 4	Malawi
Aaron Lesupi 3' (pen.)		Felix Nyirongo 27'; John Maduka 51'; Jones Nkhwazi 73'; Meck Mwase 88'

Gaborone
Attendance: 8,000
March 2, 1997

Lesotho	0 – 2	Zambia
		Edward Kangwa 10'; Mwape Miti 15'

Maseru
Attendance: 20,000
March 2, 1997

Swaziland	0 – 4	Mozambique
		Adelino 36', 42', 70'; Eurico 83'

Somhlolo National Stadium, Lobamba
Attendance: 15,000
March 16, 1997

Namibia	2 – 1 (aet)	Zimbabwe
Johannes Hindjou 87' (pen.), 119' (pen.)		Gilbert Mushangazhike 76' (pen.)

Gaborone
Attendance: 8,000

== Final round ==
Team	Pts	Pld	W	D	L	GF	GA
Zambia	8	4	2	2	0	9	4
Namibia	6	4	1	3	0	6	3
Mozambique	5	4	1	2	1	7	5
Tanzania	3	4	0	3	1	4	7
Malawi	2	4	0	2	2	5	12

April 12, 1997

Malawi	2 – 2	Mozambique
Jones Nkhwazi 57'; Albert Mpinganjira 70'		Tico-Tico 31'; Nuro Tualibudane 79'

Lilongwe
April 19, 1997

Zambia	4 – 0	Malawi
Paul Chella 26'; Edward Kangwa 44'; Mwape Miti 85'; Nelson Banda 88'

Lusaka
May 31, 1997

Tanzania	0 – 0	Namibia

Mwanza
Attendance: 15,000
June 15, 1997

Mozambique	3 – 0	Tanzania
Tico-Tico 50', 69'; Adelino 76'

Maputo
Attendance: 50,000
June 28, 1997

Namibia	4 – 1	Malawi
Gervatius Uri Khob 35'; Sandro de Gouveia 57'; Johannes Hindjou 69'; Eliphas Shivute 75'		Lovemore Fazili 77'

Windhoek
Attendance: 8,000
July 5, 1997

Tanzania	2 – 2	Zambia
Edibilly Lunyamila 56'; Hussein Marsha 75' (pen.)		Masauso Tembo 71'; Alex Namazaba 83'

Arusha
Attendance: 22,000
July 20, 1997

Mozambique	1 – 1	Namibia
Pinto Barros 15'		Silvester Goraseb 44'

Maputo
Attendance: 15,000
August 2, 1997

Zambia	2 – 1	Mozambique
Frazer Kamwandi 50', 81'		Sergio Faife 51'

Lusaka
August 9, 1997

Malawi	2 – 2	Tanzania
Lovemore Fazili 19'; Jones Nkhwazi 72'		Idelphonce Amlima 7'; Victor Bambo 43'

Lilongwe
Attendance: 9,000
August 31, 1997

Namibia	1 – 1	Zambia
Mohammed Ouseb 47' (pen.)		David Siame 32'

Windhoek
Attendance: 12,000

== Individual scorers ==
- 4 goals
  - (Mozambique) Adelino
- 3 goals
  - (Namibia) Johannes Hindjou
  - (Mozambique) Tico-Tico
  - Jones Nkhwazi
- 2 goals
  - (Zambia) Edward Kangwa
  - (Zambia) Mwape Miti
  - (Zambia) Frazer Kamwandi
  - Lovemore Fazili
