= Miguel Pereira (footballer, born 1975) =

Angolan footballer

Personal information
- Full name: Miguel Francisco Pereira
- Date of birth: 23 August 1975 (age 51)
- Place of birth: Angola
- Height: 1.79 m (5 ft 10 in)
- Position: Forward

Senior career*
Years	Team	Apps	(Gls)
1993–1999	Schalke 04	16	(1)
1999–2000	FC St. Pauli	15	(1)
2002–2003	1860 Munich II	7	(0)
2003–2005	VfB Hüls	80	(26)
2005–2006	SG Wattenscheid 09	13	(0)
2006–2007	VfB Hüls	14	(3)
Total		165	(31)

International career
1998–1999	Angola	11	(2)
- * Club domestic league appearances and goals

Miguel Francisco Pereira (born 23 August 1975) is an Angolan former professional footballer who played as a forward. He also earned 11 caps with the Angola national team, scoring two goals. He represented Angola at the 1998 African Cup of Nations.

== Career statistics ==
Scores and results list Angola's goal tally first, score column indicates score after each Pereira goal.

List of international goals scored by Miguel Pereira
No.	Date	Venue	Opponent	Score	Result	Competition
1	12 February 1998	Stade Omnisports de Bobo-Dioulasso, Bobo-Dioulasso, Burkina Faso	Namibia	3–3	3–3	1998 Africa Cup of Nations
2	30 May 1998	Independence Stadium, Windhoek, Namibia	Namibia	1–1	1–1	1998 COSAFA Cup
