= Liverpool Okahandja =

Namibian football club

Liverpool Okahandja is a Namibian football club based in Okahandja. The club won the NFA Cup in 1992 and became Namibia Premier League champions in 2001–2002.

The Namibian 1998 African Cup of Nations squad included five Liverpool players: Petrus Haraseb, Bimbo Tjihero, Ruben Van Wyk, Simon Uutoni and Johannes Hindjou.
