= Edward Kangwa =

Zambian footballer (born 1977)

Personal information
- Full name: Edward Kangwa
- Date of birth: 21 June 1977 (age 49)
- Place of birth: Zambia
- Position: Forward

Senior career*
Years	Team	Apps	(Gls)
1994–1998	Zanaco FC		
1998	Qingdao Jonoon FC	9	(2)
1999–2004	Zanaco FC		
2004–2005	Olympiakos Nicosia	16	(4)
2005–2006	Partizani Tirana	?	(?)

International career
1996–1997	Zambia	11	(2)
- * Club domestic league appearances and goals

Edward Kangwa (born 21 June 1977) is a retired Zambian professional footballer who played for Zanaco FC, Qingdao Jonoon FC, Olympiakos Nicosia and Partizani Tirana as well as the Zambia national team.
