= Thabo Mooki =

South African soccer player

Personal information
- Full name: Lawrence Thabo Mooki
- Date of birth: 22 October 1974 (age 52)
- Place of birth: Soweto, South Africa
- Positions: Defensive midfielder; central midfielder

Youth career
- Manzer City
- Kaizer Chiefs

Senior career*
| Years | Team | Apps | (Gls) |
| 1994–2009 | Kaizer Chiefs | 343 | (37) |

International career^{‡}
| 1993 | South Africa-U20 | 1 | (0) |
| 1997–1998 | South Africa | 3 | (1) |
- * Club domestic league appearances and goals as of 13 February 2010 ‡ National team caps and goals as of 13 February 2010

Thabo Mooki affectionately nicknamed Tsiki-Tsiki (born 22 October 1974) is a South African former soccer player who played as a midfielder. He spent all his professional career with Premier Soccer League club Kaizer Chiefs. He also represented South Africa.

== Club career ==
Mooki made nearly 350 appearances for Kaizer Chiefs in a 15-year career. Known as Tsiki Tsiki, he made his professional debut for Kazier Chiefs under manager Philippe Troussier in 1994.

== International career ==
Mooki made his full international debut in a friendly against the Netherlands on 4 June 1997.

He was capped three times scoring one goal.

=== International goals ===
| # | Date | Venue | Opponent | Score | Result | Competition |
|---|---|---|---|---|---|---|
| 1 | 1998-01-24 | Windhoek, Namibia | Namibia | 1-0 | 2-3 | COSAFA Cup |
