= Freddie Mwila Jr. =

Zambian footballer (1974-2009)

Personal information
- Date of birth: 1 October 1974
- Place of birth: Zambia
- Date of death: 23 March 2009 (aged 34)
- Place of death: Cairo, Egypt
- Position: Forward

Senior career*
Years	Team	Apps	(Gls)
1997–2001	Nkana		
2001	Zamalek SC		
2001–2004	Nkana		

International career
1995–2001	Zambia		
- * Club domestic league appearances and goals

Freddie Mwila Jr. (1 October 1974 – 23 March 2009) was a Zambian international footballer.

== Career ==
Mwila spent most of his career playing for local side Nkana F.C. He also played professional football in Egypt with Zamalek.

Mwila made several appearances for the Zambia national football team, captaining the side during 2002 FIFA World Cup qualifying.

== Personal ==
In March 2009, Mwila died shortly after complaining of a headache in Cairo, Egypt.

Mwila's father, Freddie Mwila, was a Zambian international football player and manager.
