= Nuro Tualibudane =

Mozambique footballer

Personal information
- Full name: Nuro Amino Tualibudane
- Date of birth: 19 October 1973 (age 53)
- Place of birth: Mozambique
- Position: Striker

Senior career*
Years	Team	Apps	(Gls)
- C.D. Maxaquene
1997–1998	Nea Salamis Famagusta FC		
1998–2001	Jomo Cosmos		
- Đà Nẵng F.C.

International career
1990s–2001	Mozambique		
- * Club domestic league appearances and goals

Nuro Tualibudane (born 19 October 1973 in Mozambique) is a retired footballer from Mozambique is last known to have competed for Đà Nẵng of the Vietnamese V.League 1. Besides Mozambique, he has played in South Africa, Cyprus, and Vietnam.

== Career ==
=== South Africa ===
Wearing the colours of Jomo Cosmos from 1996 to 2001, Tualibidane hit in 9 goals in 30 appearances before going to Cyprus in 1997. But, in 1999, Manning Rangers cast aspersions on Tualibudane and Zimbabwean Morgan Nkathazo, insisting that they were in South Africa illegally and did not have possess work permits. This proved to be false and the Mozambican went on to strike 25 goals in 62 starts after returning from Cyprus, including a hat-trick as Cosmos bettered Free State Stars 3-1 in 2000 and a brace in a 3-1 dispatching of Hellenic the same year.

=== Vietnam ===
Turning out for Đà Nẵng F.C. of the Vietnamese V.League 1, the retiree hit 3 goals within 15 minutes upon recovering form injury in 2003 as they dispatched Hà Nội ACB 4-1, scoring 6 goals by the seventh round of the 2004 V-League. However, he was temporarily dropped from the squad for underperformance in 2005 and was unable to participate in the 2006 AFC Champions League clash at home to Dalian swing to intestinal problems.
