= Tico-Tico =

Mozambican footballer

Personal information
- Full name: Manuel José Luís Bucuane
- Date of birth: 16 August 1973 (age 53)
- Place of birth: Lourenço Marques, Mozambique
- Height: 1.73 m (5 ft 8 in)
- Position: Striker

Senior career*
Years	Team	Apps	(Gls)
1992–1994	Desportivo de Maputo	63	(35)
1994–1997	Estrela da Amadora	28	(11)
1997–2000	Jomo Cosmos	91	(44)
2000	Tampa Bay Mutiny	18	(4)
2000–2004	Jomo Cosmos	104	(32)
2004–2006	Supersport United	40	(8)
2006–2008	Orlando Pirates	21	(4)
2008	Maritzburg United	8	(0)
2008–2010	Jomo Cosmos	14	(1)
2010–2011	Desportivo de Maputo		
Total		387	(139)

International career
1992–2010	Mozambique	94	(30)
- * Club domestic league appearances and goals as of 29 July 2013 UTC

Manuel José Luís Bucuane (born 16 August 1973), better known professionally as Tico-Tico, is a Mozambican former footballer who played as a striker. In his career, Tico-Tico played primarily for Desportivo de Maputo in Mozambique and Jomo Cosmos in South Africa.

== Career ==
In June 2000, Tico-Tico was signed by the Tampa Bay Mutiny after playing for Jomo Cosmos.

Tico-Tico is his country's 2nd most capped player and record goal scorer. He is also the PSL's leading scorer of all-time with 108 goals. As an international footballer he represented his country at the 1996 Africa Cup of Nations (where he scored Mozambique's first ever goal at an AFCON), 1998 African Nations Cup and 2010 Africa Cup of Nations.

In September 2012, he was honored by the Mozambican Football Federation for his long international career. He would go on to play in a charity match in his honor where his Mozambican national side kit and football boots were sold to raise money for charitable causes.

=== International goals ===
Scores and results list Mozambique's goal tally first.

No.	Date	Venue	Opponent	Score	Result	Competition
1.	30 August 1992	Estádio da Machava, Maputo, Mozambique	Lesotho	?–0	3–0	1994 African Cup of Nations qualification
2.	11 July 1993	Setsoto Stadium, Maseru, Lesotho	Lesotho	?–?	1–1	1994 African Cup of Nations qualification
3.	25 July 1993	Moi International Sports Centre, Nairobi, Kenya	Kenya	1–0	1–4	1994 African Cup of Nations qualification
4.	13 November 1994	Estádio da Machava, Maputo, Mozambique	Guinea	2–1	2–1	1996 African Cup of Nations qualification
5.	25 June 1995	Estádio do Ferroviário, Beira, Mozambique	Zimbabwe	3–0	3–1	Friendly
6.	7 January 1996	Estádio da Machava, Maputo, Mozambique	Algeria	1–0	1–0	Friendly
7.	16 January 1996	EPRU Stadium, Port Elizabeth, South Africa	Tunisia	1–0	1–1	1996 African Cup of Nations
8.	12 April 1997	Silver Stadium, Lilongwe, Malawi	Malawi	1–0	2–2	1997 COSAFA Cup
9.	15 June 1997	Estádio da Machava, Maputo, Mozambique	Tanzania	1–0	3–0	1997 COSAFA Cup
10.	15 June 1997	Estádio da Machava, Maputo, Mozambique	Tanzania	2–0	3–0	1997 COSAFA Cup
11.	22 June 1997	Estádio da Machava, Maputo, Mozambique	Zambia	1–0	2–2	1998 African Cup of Nations qualification
12.	13 July 1997	Stade Anjalay, Belle Vue Maurel, Mauritius	Mauritius	3–1	3–1	1998 African Cup of Nations qualification
13.	27 July 1997	Estádio da Machava, Maputo, Mozambique	Malawi	2–1	2–1	1998 African Cup of Nations qualification
14.	11 January 1998	Stade Municipal, Lomé, Togo	Togo	1–1	2–1	Friendly
15.	11 January 1998	Stade Municipal, Lomé, Togo	Togo	2–1	2–1	Friendly
16.	20 January 1998	Accra Sports Stadium, Accra, Ghana	Ghana	1–2	1–3	Friendly
17.	25 January 1998	Botswana National Stadium, Gaborone, Botswana	Botswana	1–1	2–1	1998 COSAFA Cup
18.	4 October 1998	Estádio da Machava, Maputo, Mozambique	Eritrea	3–0	3–1	2000 African Cup of Nations qualification
19.	11 April 1999	Estádio da Machava, Maputo, Mozambique	Cameroon	1–4	1–6	2000 African Cup of Nations qualification
20.	23 April 2000	Estádio da Machava, Maputo, Mozambique	Sudan	1–0	2–1	2002 FIFA World Cup qualification
21.	23 April 2000	Estádio da Machava, Maputo, Mozambique	Sudan	2–1	2–1	2002 FIFA World Cup qualification
22.	27 July 2003	Independence Stadium, Lusaka, Zambia	Zambia	2–1	2–4	2003 COSAFA Cup
23.	18 April 2004	Estádio da Machava, Maputo, Mozambique	Madagascar	1–0	2–0	2004 COSAFA Cup
24.	3 June 2007	Estádio da Machava, Maputo, Mozambique	Burkina Faso	2–1	3–1	2008 Africa Cup of Nations qualification
25.	3 June 2007	Estádio da Machava, Maputo, Mozambique	Burkina Faso	3–1	3–1	2008 Africa Cup of Nations qualification
26.	8 September 2007	National Stadium, Dar es Salaam, Tanzania	Tanzania	1–0	1–0	2008 Africa Cup of Nations qualification
27.	21 May 2008	Estádio da Machava, Maputo, Mozambique	Lesotho	2–2	2–3	Friendly
28.	22 June 2008	Estádio da Machava, Maputo, Mozambique	Madagascar	1–0	3–0	2010 FIFA World Cup qualification
29.	30 July 2008	Thulamahashe Stadium, Bushbuckridge, South Africa	Madagascar	1–0	2–1	2008 COSAFA Cup
30.	6 September 2009	Estádio da Machava, Maputo, Mozambique	Kenya	1–0	1–0	2010 FIFA World Cup qualification
