= Silvester Goraseb =

Namibian footballer

Personal information
- Date of birth: 7 September 1974 (age 52)
- Place of birth: Windhoek, South West Africa
- Position: Midfielder

Youth career
- Try Again

Senior career*
Years	Team	Apps	(Gls)
1992-2009	Black Africa		

International career
1994–2002	Namibia	66	(7)
Medal record
Men's football
Representing Namibia
COSAFA Cup
Runner-up	1997 Southern Africa
Runner-up	1999 Southern Africa
- * Club domestic league appearances and goals

Silvester Goraseb (born 7 September 1974) is a retired Namibian footballer, who is chairman of Premier League side Black Africa. He is also president of the NAFPU, the Namibian players' union.

== Club career ==
Born in Windhoek, Goraseb grew up in the city's largest township, Katutura and joined Black Africa from Try Again in 1992. He won three league titles with the club.

== International career ==
Nicknamed Lolo, Goraseb competed for the Namibia national football team from 1996 to 2001, including the 1998 African Cup of Nations. He made his debut for his country against Mali in October 1994 and totalled 7 goals in 66 games for the Brave Warriors.

== Personal life ==
His father Steve Stephanus and uncle Norries Goraseb both played successfully for Katutura giants Orlando Pirates. He works as a chief human resources policy analyst at the Office of the Prime Minister.

== Honours ==
Namibia

- COSAFA Cup: Runner-up, 1997, 1999
