= Tauya Mrewa =

Zimbabwean association footballer (born 1971)

Personal information
- Date of birth: 2 October 1971 (age 55)
- Place of birth: Zimbabwe
- Position: Striker

Senior career*
Years	Team	Apps	(Gls)
–1999	Dynamos		
1999	Hellenic		
1999–2001	SuperSport United		
2001	Cape Town Spurs		
2002	AmaZulu		
2002–2005	Bush Bucks		

International career
- Zimbabwe
- * Club domestic league appearances and goals

Tauya Mrewa (born 2 October 1971) grew up in Mvuma town where he started his football career at Athens Mine FC and is a Zimbabwean former footballer who last played as a striker for Bush Bucks.

== Club career ==
In 1998, Mrewa trialed for Scottish top flight side Hibs.

== Style of play ==
Mrewa mainly operated as a striker and was known for his dribbling ability.

== Post-playing career ==
After retiring from professional football, Mrewa who is a qualified medical doctor became involved in the Zion Christian Church in South Africa.

== Personal life ==
Mrewa has been nicknamed the "Flying Doctor".
