= Masauso Tembo =

Zambian footballer (born 1976)

Personal information
- Date of birth: 25 February 1976 (age 50)
- Position: Forward

Senior career*
Years	Team	Apps	(Gls)
1997–1998	Zamsure F.C.		
1999	Zanaco F.C.		
1999–2001	Al Urooba		
2001–2002	Zanaco F.C.		
2003–?	City of Lusaka F.C.		
2006–2007	Johor FA		
2007–2008	Lusaka Dynamos F.C.		
2008–2009	Petro Atlético		

International career
1997–2000	Zambia	30	(4)
- * Club domestic league appearances and goals

Masauso Tembo (born 25 February 1976) is a Zambian retired football striker. He was a squad member at the 1998 and 2000 African Cup of Nations.
