= Philemon Angula =

Namibian footballer

Fillemon Angula
Personal information
- Full name: Fillemon Kalutenda Angula
- Date of birth: 20 August 1974 (age 52)
- Place of birth: Swakopmund, South West Africa
- Position: Forward

Youth career
- Young Chiefs
- Oluno Santos
- Oniipa United FC

Senior career*
Years	Team	Apps	(Gls)
1992-2004	Oshakati City		
2004-2006	Civics		
2006-2008	Oshakati City		

International career
1998-2002	Namibia	9	(2)

Managerial career
- Ongwediva City
- 2017-2018: Young Chiefs
Medal record
First place	Namibia Premier League	2006
First place	Namibia Premier League	2007
- * Club domestic league appearances and goals

Philemon Angula (born 20 August 1974) is a Namibian retired footballer.

== Club career ==
The dreadlocked striker was born in Swakopmund but moved to Onathinge in the Oshikoto Region and then left for neighboring Angola aged only 14 where he lived in a refugee camp. On his return to Namibia in 1991, Angula mostly played for Oshakati City, except for the years 2004 to 2006 when he played for Civics, picking up two league titles.

Nicknamed Cascas, he has later coached Ongwediva City and was manager of NPL side Young Chiefs.

== International career ==
He made his debut for the Brave Warriors in a January 1998 friendly match against Niger and was capped 9 times and scored twice for the Namibia national football team, including a squad membership without actually playing at the 1998 African Cup of Nations. A great header of the ball, Angula also featured for the U-23 national team.
