= John Maduka =

Malawian footballer

Personal information
- Full name: John Maduka
- Date of birth: 27 September 1970 (age 56)
- Place of birth: Thyolo, Malawi
- Position: Midfielder

Senior career*
Years	Team	Apps	(Gls)
1989–1992	Davie Cosmos		
1992–1996	Silver Strikers	139	(39)
1995	Strindheim IL (Loan)	5	(0)
1997	Preston North End (Loan)	0	(0)
1996–2003	Bush Bucks	196	(33)
2003-2004	Zulu Royals	25	(1)
2004–2009	Bloemfontein Celtic	118	(6)

International career
1989–2005	Malawi	68	(13)

Managerial career
- 2019—2022: Bloemfontein Celtic
- 2022: Maritzburg United
- 2023–?: Royal AM
- –2026: Magesi
- * Club domestic league appearances and goals

John Maduka (born 27 September 1970 in Thyolo) is a retired Malawian footballer and coach. He used to play for Bloemfontein Celtic until his retirement in 2009. He was most recently the head coach of Magesi.

== Career ==
Maduka started his football career at 16. He played for his school, Lilongwe Boys Primary School, where his talent was spotted by Davie Saccur, coach and owner of Davie Cosmos. While playing for Davie Cosmos and Lilongwe Boys Primary School, in 1992 he attracted the interest of Silver strikers and Mighty Limbe Leaf Wanderers. Maduka opted for Silver Strikers as he did not want to leave his home town of Lilongwe.

He last played for Bloemfontein Celtic in South Africa, as a midfielder.

Maduka debuted for Malawi in a 0–4 loss against Zimbabwe in 1991. He has since made close to 90 appearances for The Flames. He also played South African based team club Bloemfontein Celtic where he spent 5 years and made 118 appearances before retiring in 2009. He was the assistant coach at the club with Steve Komphela being the head coach and became coach of Bloemfontein Celtic in July 2020.

== Clubs ==
- 2004–2009 Bloemfontein Celtic 118 apps, 6 goals
- 2003 Zulu Royals 25 apps, 1 goal
- 1996–2003 Bush Bucks 196 apps, 33 goals
- 1997 Preston North End 0 apps.
- 1995 Strindheim IL (on loan) 5 apps.
- 1992–1996 Silver Strikers 139 apps, 39 goals
- 1992–1996 Black Aces
- 1989–1992 Davie Cosmos
