= Arnaldo Ouana =

Mozambican footballer

Personal information
- Full name: Arnaldo Sebastião Ouana
- Date of birth: 22 December 1969 (age 56)
- Place of birth: Mozambique
- Height: 1.80 m (5 ft 11 in)
- Position: Forward

Senior career*
Years	Team	Apps	(Gls)
1993–1994	Costa do Sol		
1994–1995	Campomaiorense	1	(0)
1995–1996	Costa do Sol		

International career
1987–1999	Mozambique	37	(10)

Managerial career
- 2016–: Mozambique U-20
- * Club domestic league appearances and goals

Arnaldo Ouana (born 22 December 1969) is a retired Mozambique international football player and current football coach.

Arnaldo Ouana spent most of his career playing in the Mozambique football league, primarily with Clube de Desportos da Costa do Sol. He had a brief spell playing in Liga de Honra with Campomaiorense.

Arnaldo Ouana made several appearances for the Mozambique national football team, including three appearances at the 1996 African Cup of Nations finals. He also played in two 1994 FIFA World Cup qualifying matches.

He was placed in charge of the Mozambique under-20 national football team for the 2016 COSAFA U-20 Cup.
