= Hillary Makasa =

Zambian footballer (1972-2020)

Personal information
- Date of birth: January 12, 1976
- Place of birth: Zambia
- Date of death: October 5, 2020 (aged 44)
- Place of death: Lusaka, Zambia
- Height: 1.85 m (6 ft 1 in)
- Position: Defender

Senior career*
Years	Team	Apps	(Gls)
1991–1998	Roan United		
1999	Kabwe Warriors		
1999–2001	Ajax Cape Town		
2001–2002	Ria Stars	38	(3)
2002–2003	Pietersburg Pillars		
2003–2007	Nchanga Rangers		

International career
1995–2003	Zambia	51	(4)
- * Club domestic league appearances and goals

Hillary Makasa (12 January 1972 − 5 October 2020) was a Zambian footballer. He once played for Nchanga Rangers.

== International career ==
Makasa was part of the Zambian African Nations Cup squads in 1996, 1998 and 2000.

== Clubs ==
- 1991–1999 : (Zambia) Roan United
- 1990–2001 : (South Africa) Ajax Cape Town FC
- 2001–2002 : (South Africa) Ria Stars
- 2003–2004 : (Zambia) Nchanga Rangers

== Death ==
Makasa died on 5 October 2020 at the University Teaching Hospital in Lusaka.
