= Dennis Masina =

Liswati footballer (born 1982)

Personal information
- Full name: Dennis Yuki Mcebo Masina
- Date of birth: 29 May 1982 (age 44)
- Place of birth: Mbabane, Swaziland
- Height: 1.69 m (5 ft 7 in)
- Position: Midfielder

Senior career*
Years	Team	Apps	(Gls)
1998–2000	Manzini Wanderers	30	(14)
2000–2002	Bush Bucks	46	(7)
2002–2004	Supersport United	41	(8)
2004–2005	Eendracht Aalst	23	(5)
2005–2006	KV Mechelen	27	(6)
2006–2009	Supersport United	34	(3)
2009–2011	Orlando Pirates	11	(0)
2011	→ Mpumalanga Black Aces (loan)	10	(0)
2011–2016	Mpumalanga Black Aces	36	(5)
2018–2019	Mbombela United	3	(0)

International career
1999–2011	Swaziland	36	(0)
- * Club domestic league appearances and goals

Dennis Yuki Mcebo Masina (born 29 May 1982) is a Liswati former footballer who played for clubs in South Africa and Belgium as a midfielder.

== Career ==
Born in Mbabane, Hhohho District, Masina was linked with a move to Feyenoord in July 2002, and later with Tottenham Hotspur in October.
