= Paulito =

Mozambican footballer

Antonio "Paulito" Trigo (born 22 November 1976 in Nampula) is a Mozambican football (soccer) player who last played for Mamelodi Sundowns. His position is a midfielder.

== Clubs ==
- 1994–1998: (Mozambique) Ferroviário de Maputo
- 1998–2003: (South Africa) Manning Rangers
- 2003–2007: (South Africa) Mamelodi Sundowns
