= David Siame =

Zambian footballer (born 1976)

Personal information
- Date of birth: 8 October 1976 (age 50)
- Position: Forward

Senior career*
Years	Team	Apps	(Gls)
- Zamsure F.C.

International career
1997–1999	Zambia	4	(2)
- * Club domestic league appearances and goals

David Siame (born 8 October 1976) is a retired Zambian football striker.
