= Benjamin Nkonjera =

Zimbabwean footballer (died 1999)

Personal information
- Date of death: 13 March 1999
- Position: Midfielder

Senior career*
Years	Team	Apps	(Gls)
1990–1994	Highlanders F.C.		
1994–1995	SC Kriens	0?	
–1999	Highlanders F.C.		

International career
1991–1998	Zimbabwe	28+	(8+)
- * Club domestic league appearances and goals

Benjamin Nkonjera (died 13 March 1999) was a Zimbabwean football midfielder. Besides Zimbabwe, he played in Switzerland.
