= Pinto Barros =

Mozambican footballer

Personal information
- Date of birth: 4 May 1973 (age 53)
- Position: Defender

Senior career*
Years	Team	Apps	(Gls)
- Ferroviário Maputo
- AmaZulu

International career
1994–1999	Mozambique	44	(2)
- * Club domestic league appearances and goals

Pinto Barros (born 4 May 1973) is a Mozambican former footballer who played as a defender. He made 44 appearances for the Mozambique national team from 1994 to 1999. He was also named in Mozambique's squad for the 1998 African Cup of Nations tournament.

== Career ==
Barros played for Ferroviário Maputo and South African club AmaZulu.
