= Chief Santos =

Namibian football club

- Full name: Chief Santos
- Founded: 1963; 62 years ago
- Ground: Oscar Norich Stadium; Tsumeb, Namibia
- League: Namibia Premier League
- 2017/2018: 16th (Relegation)
Home colours	Away colours

Chief Santos is a football club in Tsumeb, Namibia. The club was formerly part of the Namibia Premier League, but was relegated to the second league in 2005. The club has been promoted back to the Premier League under the management of Mohammed Ouseb, in 2008. They returned to the Premier League again in 2016, taking the victory in their final North East First Division match.

== Achievements ==
- Namibia Premier League: 2

1993, 2003

- NFA-Cup: 4

1991, 1998, 1999, 2000

== Performance in CAF competitions ==
- African Cup of Champions Clubs: 1 appearance

1994 – Preliminary round

- CAF Cup: 1 appearance

1997 – withdrew in First Round

- CAF Cup Winners' Cup: 2 appearances

1992 – withdrew in preliminary round
2000 – Preliminary round
