= 1999 COSAFA Cup =

Tournament details
- Teams: 10 (from 1 confederation)

Final positions
- Champions: Angola (1st title)
- Runners-up: Namibia

Tournament statistics
- Matches played: 14
- Goals scored: 28 (2 per match)

This page provides summaries to the 1999 COSAFA Cup.

== Qualifying round ==
=== First round ===
Winners of the first round advanced to the quarter-finals; losers advanced to the second round.

Feb 7, 1999

Lesotho	1–0	Namibia
Teele Nts'onyana 11'

Maseru
Attendance: 12,000
Feb 20, 1999

Botswana	1–2	South Africa
Dipsy Selolwane 13'		Pollen Ndlanya 36'; Alfred Phiri 39'

Gaborone
Attendance: 25,000
Apr 24, 1999

Malawi	1–2	Angola
Almeida 60' (o.g)		Mendonça 76'; Mabedi 79' (o.g.)

Blantyre
Attendance: 10,000
May 9, 1999

Swaziland	3–1	Mozambique
Tholeni Nkambule 14' (pen.), 40'; Dennis Masina 64'		Tomás 68' (pen.)

Somhlolo National Stadium, Lobamba
Attendance: 18,000

=== Second round ===
Losers of the first round competed for the remaining two spots for the quarter-finals.

May 22, 1999

Malawi	1–1 (2–4 pen.)	Namibia
Bimbo Tjihero 43' (o.g.)		Simon Uutoni 1'

Blantyre
Attendance: 20,000
May 28, 1999

Botswana	0–2	Mozambique
		Dario 12'; Arnaldo 44'

Gaborone
Attendance: 15,000

== Final round ==
Zambia and Zimbabwe received byes to the quarter-finals.

=== Quarter-finals ===
July 4, 1999

Lesotho	0–1	Angola
		Betinho 25'

Setsoto Stadium, Maseru
Attendance: 11,000
July 18, 1999

Swaziland	1–1 (asdet) (4–3 pen.)	Zimbabwe
Bongani Mdluli 89' (pen.)		Kaitano Tembo 61'

Somhlolo National Stadium, Lobamba
Attendance: 18,000
July 31, 1999

Namibia	1–1 (asdet) (4–1 pen.)	South Africa
Johannes Hindjou 50'		Pollen Ndlanya 32'

Independence Stadium, Windhoek
Attendance: 12,000
Aug 7, 1999

Zambia	1–1 (asdet) (4–3 pen.)	Mozambique
David Siame 71'		Davies Phiri 20' (o.g.)

Independence Stadium, Lusaka
Attendance: 40,000

=== Semi-finals ===
Aug 14, 1999

Zambia	0–1	Angola
		Betinho 70'

Independence Stadium, Lusaka
Attendance: 40,000
Aug 28, 1999

Namibia	1–1 (asdet) (4–2 pen.)	Swaziland
Silvester Goraseb 67'		Dennis Masina 88'

Independence Stadium, Windhoek
Attendance: 12,000

=== Final ===
Sep 26, 1999

Angola	1–0	Namibia
Betinho 14' (pen.)

Estádio da Cidadela, Luanda
Attendance: 60,000
Oct 2, 1999

Namibia	1–1 (asdet)	Angola
Eliphas Shivute 7'		Zico 101'

Independence Stadium, Windhoek
Attendance: 12,000

1999 COSAFA Cup

Angola
First title
