= Stade Général Aboubacar Sangoulé Lamizana =

Stadium in Bobo-Dioulasso, Burkina Faso

Coordinates: 11°11′25″N 4°19′51″W

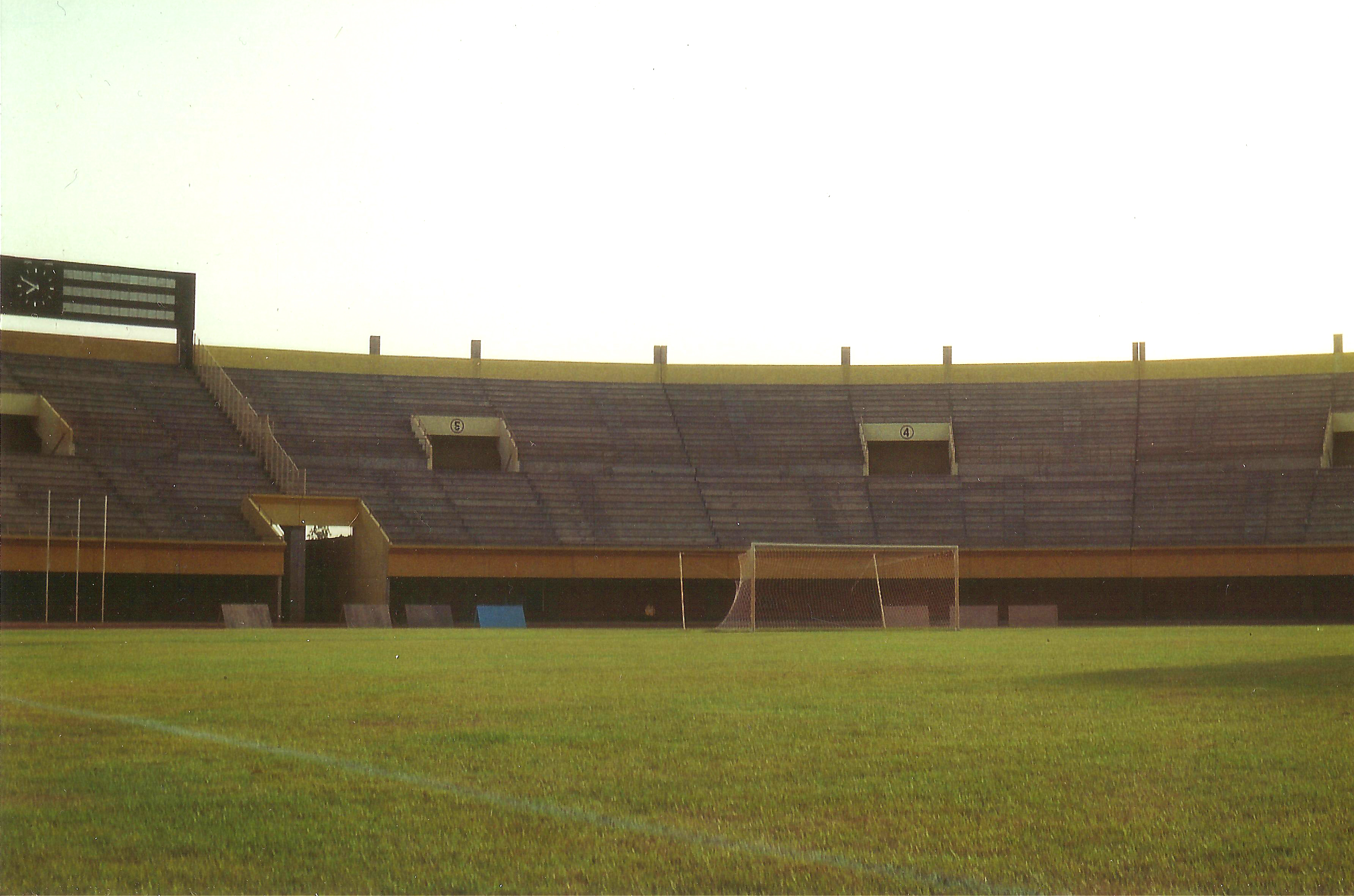
- Interactive map of Stade Général Aboubacar Sangoulé Lamizana
- Former names: Stade Omnisports de Bobo-Dioulasso (1998-2010)
- Location: Bobo Dioulasso, Burkina Faso
- Capacity: 50,000
- Surface: grass

Construction
- Opened: 1998

Tenant
- RC Bobo Dioulasso (1998-present)

Stade Général Aboubacar Sangoulé Lamizana is a multi-use stadium in Bobo Dioulasso, Burkina Faso, used mostly for football matches. The stadium hosted several matches during the 1998 Africa Cup of Nations. The stadium holds 50,000 people. Football club RC Bobo Dioulasso use the venue for home games.
