= Independence Stadium (Namibia) =

National stadium of Namibia

Coordinates: 22°36′27.55″S 17°5′27.50″E

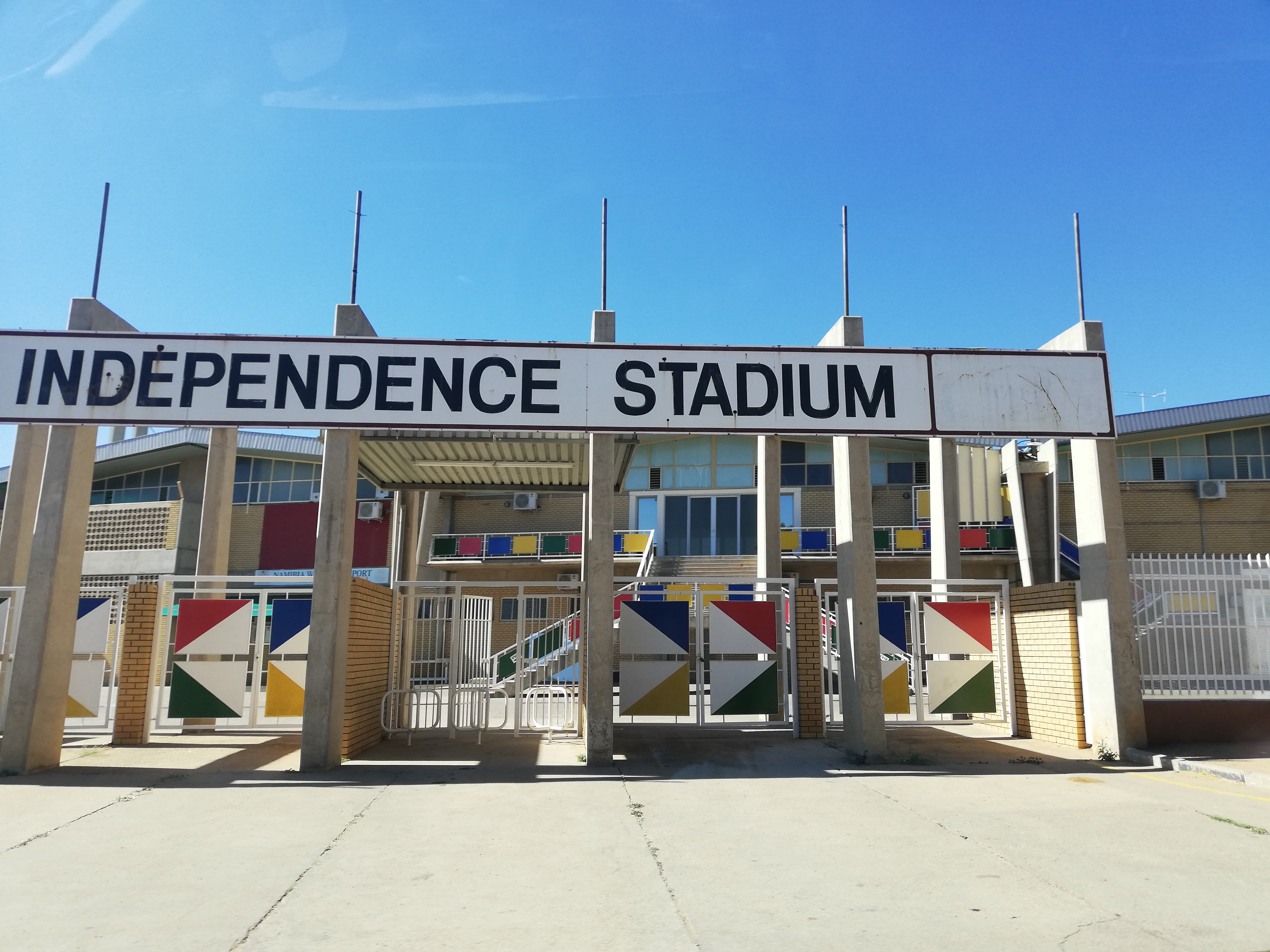
Main gate of the Independence Stadium in 2019

The Independence Stadium in Windhoek's Olympia suburb is the national stadium of the Republic of Namibia. Owned by the Government of Namibia it holds 25,000 spectators and is mainly used for association football events.

As of 2021, the stadium has been described as "dilapidated". The Confederation of African Football (CAF) has decommissioned the stadium in 2021 for it being sub-standard. No other Namibian stadium meets CAF's requirements. As a result, international games of the Namibia national football team will have to be played abroad.

The stadium hosted the wake of President Hage Geingob in February 2024, and hosted a memorial service for Namibia's first president Sam Nujoma in February 2025.

== See also ==
- Sam Nujoma Stadium, the other large football stadium in Windhoek
