= COSAFA Cup =

International association football tournament in Southern Africa

- Organiser(s): COSAFA
- Founded: 1983
- Region: Southern Africa
- Teams: 14
- Current champions: Angola (5th title)
- Most championships: Zambia (7 titles)
- Website: cosafa.com
- 2025 COSAFA Cup

COSAFA

The COSAFA Cup (known fully as COSAFA Senior Challenge Cup) is an annual tournament for teams from Southern Africa organised by Council of Southern Africa Football Associations (COSAFA), inaugurated after the ban against the Republic of South Africa had been lifted and the Africa Cup of Nations had been staged there in 1996.

== History ==
The following teams have participated in the tournament in the past: Angola, Botswana, Comoros, Eswatini (Swaziland), Lesotho, Madagascar, Malawi, Mauritius, Mozambique, Namibia, Seychelles, South Africa, Zambia, and Zimbabwe. Additionally, seven non-COSAFA members have competed: Democratic Republic of the Congo, Equatorial Guinea, Ghana, Kenya, Tanzania, Uganda and Senegal. Zambia has won the most titles with seven wins, followed by Zimbabwe with six wins. Zambia has been the most prolific side in the competition failing to reach the top 4 only four times since the tournament's inception. The first editions of the competition were a knockout tournament staged over several months. As the competition grew, it transformed into a series of mini-tournaments.

The 2010 COSAFA Senior Challenge was to be the 14th edition of the football tournament that involves teams from Southern Africa. In July 2010 it was confirmed that Angola would host the competition. The 2010 edition of the competition was cancelled in October, 2010. COSAFA stated that the Angolan authorities did not give enough guarantees to host the tournament.

== Results ==
#	Year	Host	Final			Third Place Match			Teams
#	Year	Host	Winner	Score	Runner-up	3rd Place	Score	4th Place	Teams
1	1997; Details	Home/away	Zambia	^{n/a}	Namibia	Mozambique	^{n/a}	Tanzania	9
2	1998; Details	Home/away	Zambia	^{n/a}	Zimbabwe	Angola	^{n/a}	Namibia	10
3	1999; Details	Home/away	Angola	1–0; 1–1	Namibia	Swaziland and Zambia			10
4	2000; Details	Home/away	Zimbabwe	3–0; 3–0	Lesotho	South Africa and Angola			11
5	2001; Details	Home/away	Angola	0–0; 1–0	Zimbabwe	Malawi and Zambia			11
6	2002; Details	Home/away	South Africa	3–1; 1–0	Malawi	Swaziland and Zambia			12
7	2003; Details	Home/away	Zimbabwe	2–1; 2–0	Malawi	Zambia and Swaziland			12
8	2004; Details	Various hosts	Angola	0–0 (5–4 pen.)	Zambia	Mozambique and Zimbabwe			12
9	2005; Details	Mauritius; Namibia; South Africa; Zambia	Zimbabwe	1–0	Zambia	South Africa and Angola			13
10	2006; Details	Various hosts	Zambia	2–0	Angola	Botswana and Zimbabwe			13
11	2007; Details	Botswana; Mozambique; South Africa; Swaziland	South Africa	0–0 (4–3 pen.)	Zambia	Botswana and Mozambique			13
12	2008; Details	South Africa	South Africa	2–1	Mozambique	Zambia	2–0	Madagascar	14
13	2009; Details	Zimbabwe	Zimbabwe	3–1	Zambia	Mozambique	1–0	South Africa	13
-	2010	Angola	Cancelled			Cancelled			14
14	2013; Details	Zambia	Zambia	2–0	Zimbabwe	South Africa	2–1	Lesotho	13
15	2015; Details	South Africa	Namibia	2–0	Mozambique	Madagascar	2–1	Botswana	14
16	2016; Details	Namibia	South Africa	3–2	Botswana	Swaziland	1–0	DR Congo	14
17	2017; Details	South Africa	Zimbabwe	3–1	Zambia	Tanzania	0–0 (4–2 pen.)	Lesotho	14
18	2018; Details	South Africa	Zimbabwe	4–2 (a.e.t.)	Zambia	Lesotho	1–0	Madagascar	14
19	2019; Details	South Africa	Zambia	1–0	Botswana	Zimbabwe	2–2 (5–4 pen.)	Lesotho	13
20	2021; Details	South Africa	South Africa	0–0 (a.e.t.) (5–4 pen.)	Senegal	Eswatini	1–1 (a.e.t.) (4–2 pen.)	Mozambique	10
21	2022; Details	South Africa	Zambia	1–0 (a.e.t.)	Namibia	Senegal	1–1 (a.e.t.) (4–2 pen.)	Mozambique	14
22	2023; Details	South Africa	Zambia	1–0	Lesotho	South Africa	0–0 (5–3 pen.)	Malawi	12
23	2024; Details	South Africa	Angola	5–0	Namibia	Mozambique	2–2 (3–1 pen.)	Comoros	12
24	2025; Details	South Africa	Angola	3–0	South Africa	Comoros	1–0	Madagascar	14

^n/a A round-robin tournament determined the final standings.

== Teams reaching the top four ==
As of 2024

Team	Winners	Runners-up	Third Place	Fourth Place	Semi-finalists	Top 4 Finishes
Zambia	7 (1997, 1998, 2006, 2013, 2019, 2022, 2023)	6 (2004, 2005, 2007, 2009, 2017, 2018)	1 (2008)	1 (2001)	4 (1999, 2001, 2002, 2003)	19
Zimbabwe	6 (2000, 2003, 2005, 2009, 2017, 2018)	3 (1998, 2001, 2013)	1 (2019)		2 (2004, 2006)	12
South Africa	5 (2002, 2007, 2008, 2016, 2021)	1 (2025)	2 (2013, 2023)	1 (2009)	2 (2000, 2005)	11
Angola	5 (1999, 2001, 2004, 2024, 2025)	1 (2006)	1 (1998)		2 (2000, 2005)	9
Namibia	1 (2015)	4 (1997, 1999, 2022, 2024)		1 (1998)		6
Mozambique		2 (2008, 2015)	3 (1997, 2009, 2024)	2 (2021, 2022)	2 (2004, 2007)	9
Malawi		2 (2002, 2003)	1 (2001)	1 (2023)		4
Botswana		2 (2016, 2019)		1 (2015)	2 (2006, 2007)	5
Lesotho		2 (2000, 2023)	1 (2018)	3 (2013, 2017, 2019)		6
Senegal		1 (2021)	1 (2022)			2
Eswatini (Note: Competed as Swaziland until 2018.)			2 (2016, 2021)		3 (1999, 2002, 2003)	5
Madagascar			1 (2015)	3 (2008, 2018, 2025)		4
Tanzania			1 (2017)	1 (1997)		2
Comoros			1 (2025)	1 (2024)		2
DR Congo				1 (2016)		1

== Medals (1997-2025) ==
Rank	Nation	Gold	Silver	Bronze	Total
1	Zambia	7	6	5	18
2	Zimbabwe	6	3	3	12
3	South Africa	5	1	4	10
4	Angola	5	1	3	9
5	Namibia	1	4	0	5
6	Mozambique	0	2	5	7
7	Botswana	0	2	2	4
8	Lesotho	0	2	1	3
8	Malawi	0	2	1	3
10	Senegal	0	1	1	2
11	Eswatini	0	0	5	5
12	Comoros	0	0	1	1
12	Madagascar	0	0	1	1
12	Tanzania	0	0	1	1
Totals (14 entries)		24	24	33	81

== Participating nations ==
Legend

- 1st – Champions
- 2nd – Runners-up
- 3rd – Third place
- 4th – Fourth place
- 5th – Fifth place
- SF – Semi-finals
- QF – Quarter-finals
- GS – Group stage
- 1R – First round
- 2R – Second round
- Q – Qualified
- — Hosts
- – – Did not enter
- –– – Withdrew before qualification / Banned

Team	1997	1998	1999	2000	2001	2002	2003	2004	2005	2006	2007	2008	2009	2010^{2}	2013	2015	2016	2017	2018	2019	2021	2022	2023	2024	2025	Total
Angola	–	3rd	1st	SF	1st	QF	1R	1st	SF	2nd	1R	QF	QF	x	QF	–	GS	GS	GS	––^{1}	–	GS	GS	1st	1st	20
Botswana	1R	1R	2R	1R	1R	1R	QF	QF	1R	SF	SF	QF	QF	x	GS	4th	2nd	QF	QF	2nd	GS	QF	GS	GS	GS	24
Comoros	–	–	–	–	–	–	–	–	–	–	–	GS	GS	x	–	–	–	–	GS	QF	––^{1}	GS	GS	4th	3rd	8
Eswatini	1R	1R	SF	QF	QF	SF	SF	QF	1R	1R	1R	GS	GS	x	GS	GS	3rd	QF	QF	GS	3rd	QF	GS	GS	GS	24
Lesotho	1R	1R	QF	2nd	QF	1R	1R	1R	1R	1R	1R	GS	GS	x	4th	GS	QF	4th	3rd	4th	GS	GS	2nd	GS	GS	24
Madagascar	–	–	–	––	–	QF	QF	1R	1R	1R	1R	4th	––^{1}	x	–	3rd	GS	GS	4th	–	––^{1}	QF	–	–	4th	13
Malawi	5th	1R	2R	QF	SF	2nd	2nd	QF	1R	1R	1R	GS	QF	x	QF	QF	GS	GS	GS	QF	GS	GS	4th	–	GS	23
Mauritius	–	–	–	1R	QF	1R	1R	QF	1R	1R	1R	GS	GS	x	GS	GS	GS	GS	GS	GS	–	GS	GS	–	GS	19
Mozambique	3rd	5th	QF	1R	1R	QF	QF	SF	1R	1R	SF	2nd	3rd	x	QF	2nd	QF	GS	GS	GS	4th	4th	GS	3rd	GS	24
Namibia	2nd	4th	2nd	QF	1R	1R	1R	1R	1R	1R	1R	QF	QF	x	QF	1st	QF	QF	QF	GS	GS	2nd	GS	2nd	GS	24
Seychelles	–	–	–	––	–	–	–	–	1R	1R	1R	GS	GS	x	GS	GS	GS	GS	GS	GS	–	GS	GS	GS	–	14
South Africa	–	1R	QF	SF	QF	1st	QF	1R	SF	1R	1st	1st	4th	x	3rd	QF	1st	QF	QF	QF	1st	QF	3rd	GS	2nd	23
Zambia	1st	1st	SF	QF	SF	SF	SF	2nd	2nd	1st	2nd	3rd	2nd	x	1st	QF	QF	2nd	2nd	1st	GS	1st	1st	GS	GS	24
Zimbabwe	1R	2nd	QF	1st	2nd	QF	1st	SF	1st	SF	1R	QF	1st	x	2nd	GS	GS	1st	1st	3rd	GS	–	–	GS	GS	22
Guest Nations
DR Congo^{*}	–	–	–	–	–	–	–	–	–	–	–	–	–	–	–	–	4th	–	–	–	–	–	–	–	–	1
Equatorial Guinea^{*}	–	–	–	–	–	–	–	–	–	–	–	–	–	–	––^{1}	–	–	–	–	–	–	–	–	–	–	0
Ghana^{*}	–	–	–	–	–	–	–	–	–	–	–	–	–	–	–	QF	–	–	–	–	–	–	–	–	–	1
Kenya^{*}	–	–	–	–	–	–	–	–	–	–	–	–	–	–	GS	–	–	–	–	–	–	–	–	GS	–	2
Senegal^{*}	–	–	–	–	–	–	–	–	–	–	–	–	–	–	–	–	–	–	–	–	2nd	3rd	–	–	–	2
Tanzania^{*}	4th	–	–	–	–	–	–	–	–	–	–	–	–	–	––^{1}	GS	–	3rd	–	–	–	–	–	–	GS	4
Uganda^{*}	–	–	–	–	–	–	–	–	–	–	–	–	–	–	–	–	–	–	–	QF	–	–	–	–	–	1
Total	9	10	10	11	11	12	12	12	13	13	13	14	13	0 (14)	13	14	14	14	14	13	10	14	12	12	14	

^{*}D.R. Congo, Equatorial Guinea, Ghana, Kenya, Tanzania, Uganda and Senegal are not COSAFA members, but have been invited to participate in the past.
^{1} Withdrew from tournament.
^{2} Tournament not played.

== Summary (1997–2022) ==
COSAFA Cup invitees are included in the table with blue.

Rank	Team	Part	M	W	D	L	GF	GA	GD	Points
1	Zambia	21	63	32	22	10	93	48	+45	117
2	Zimbabwe	20	59	34	17	8	100	49	+51	113
3	South Africa	20	55	30	19	6	77	29	+48	109
4	Namibia	21	59	23	17	19	76	62	+14	86
5	Mozambique	21	61	19	15	24	59	70	-11	75
6	Eswatini	21	53	20	16	17	65	57	+8	73
7	Angola	17	43	18	15	12	47	37	+10	68
8	Malawi	21	59	16	20	23	61	71	-10	68
9	Botswana	21	51	15	17	19	52	50	+2	62
10	Lesotho	21	53	14	15	24	50	74	-24	57
11	Madagascar	12	36	14	8	14	39	38	+1	50
12	Mauritius	18	40	8	8	24	25	57	-32	32
13	Comoros	6	18	4	3	11	14	28	-14	15
14	Seychelles	13	19	1	6	27	19	64	-45	9
15	Senegal	2	9	3	4	2	13	12	+1	13
16	Tanzania	3	13	2	6	5	10	15	-5	12
17	DR Congo	1	3	1	1	1	1	1	0	4
18	Ghana	1	2	0	0	2	1	5	-4	0
19	Kenya	1	3	1	1	1	5	4	+1	4
20	Uganda	1	2	0	2	0	1	1	0	2
21	Equatorial Guinea	0	0	0	0	0	0	0	0	0

== Top scorers ==
Laurindo 'Depú' Aurélio of Angola all-time top goalscorer in the tournament with 13 goals each.The secund goalscorer is Peter Ndlovu of Zimbabwe and Manuel 'Tico-Tico' Bucuane of Mozambique position with 10 goals.

Year	Player	Goals
1998	(Zimbabwe) Tauya Mrewa (Zimbabwe) Peter Ndlovu (Zimbabwe) Shepherd Muradzikwa (Zimbabwe) Benjamin Nkonjera	2
1999	(Angola) Betinho	3
2000	(Zimbabwe) Luke Petros (South Africa) Delron Buckley	2
2001	18 players tied	1
2002	(Eswatini) Mfanzile Dlamini (Zambia) Rotson Kilambe (South Africa) Teboho Mokoena (Eswatini) Siza Dlamini (South Africa) Patrick Mayo	2
2003	(Zimbabwe) Peter Ndlovu (Zambia) Noel Mwandila (Malawi) Russel Mwafulirwa	2
2004	(Zimbabwe) Peter Ndlovu	3
2005	(Zambia) Collins Mbesuma	4
2006	(Angola) Fabrice Akwa	3
2007	(Madagascar) Paulin Voavy	3
2008	(Seychelles) Phillip Zialor	4
2009	(Zimbabwe) Cuthbert Malajila	4
2013	(Botswana) Jerome Ramatlhakwane	4
2015	(Madagascar) Sarivahy Vombola	5
2016	(Eswatini) Felix Badenhorst	5
2017	(Zimbabwe) Ovidy Karuru	6
2018	(Botswana) Onkabetse Makgantai	5
2019	(Malawi) Gabadinho Mhango (Malawi) Gerald Phiri Jr. (Mauritius) Ashley Nazira	3
2021	(South Africa) Sepana Letsoalo	4
2022	(Eswatini) Sabelo Ndzinisa	3
2023	(South Africa) Tshegofatso Mabasa (Zambia) Albert Kangwanda	3
2024	(Angola) Depú	5
2025	(Angola) Depú	8

== See also ==
- COSAFA Women's Championship
- COSAFA U-20 Challenge Cup
- COSAFA U-17 Challenge Cup
