= 1998 African Cup of Nations squads =

List of footballers

Below is a list of squads used in the 1998 African Cup of Nations.

== Group A ==
=== Burkina Faso ===
Coach: (France) Philippe Troussier

No.	Pos.	Player	Date of birth (age)	Caps	Club
1	GK	Ibrahima Diarra (captain)	16 February 1971 (aged 26)		(Morocco) FUS Rabat
2	FW	Seydou Traoré	17 September 1970 (aged 27)		(France) Bressuire
3	DF	Firmin Sanou	21 April 1973 (aged 24)		(Burkina Faso) Étoile Filante
4	MF	Abdoulaye Traoré	29 November 1974 (aged 23)		(Burkina Faso) USFA
5	DF	Ousmane Coulibaly	23 February 1969 (aged 28)		(Burkina Faso) Racing Club de Bobo
6	DF	Brahima Korbeogo	23 January 1975 (aged 23)		(Burkina Faso) USFA
7	FW	Ismael Koudou	27 September 1975 (aged 22)		(Burkina Faso) ASFA Yennega
8	MF	Manga Diabaté	13 November 1973 (aged 24)		(Burkina Faso) USFA
9	FW	Kassoum Ouédraogo	12 April 1966 (aged 31)		(Germany) VfL Osnabrück
10	FW	Ousmane Sanou	11 March 1978 (aged 19)		(Netherlands) Willem II
11	MF	Alain Nana	7 December 1971 (aged 26)		(Burkina Faso) Etoile Filante
12	MF	Brahima Traoré	24 February 1974 (aged 23)		(France) Bressuire
13	MF	Roméo Kambou	13 November 1980 (aged 17)		(Burkina Faso) USFA
14	DF	Boureima Zongo	16 March 1972 (aged 25)		(Burkina Faso) Racing Club de Bobo
15	MF	Sidi Napon	29 August 1972 (aged 25)		(France) Evry
16	DF	Jean-Michel Liade Gnonka	20 July 1980 (aged 17)		(Burkina Faso) ASFA Yennega
17	DF	Souleymane Doumbia			(Ivory Coast) USC Bassam
18	DF	Ibrahima Tallé	31 March 1968 (aged 29)		(Ivory Coast) Séwé Sports de San Pedro
19	FW	Oumar Barro	3 June 1974 (aged 23)		(Burkina Faso) Étoile Filante
20	FW	Alassane Ouédraogo	7 September 1980 (aged 17)		(Belgium) Charleroi
21	GK	Ibrahima Traoré	19 November 1967 (aged 30)		(Burkina Faso) Étoile Filante
22	GK	Abdoulaye Soulama	29 November 1979 (aged 18)		(Burkina Faso) ASF Bobo

=== Cameroon ===
Coach: Jean-Manga Onguene

No.	Pos.	Player	Date of birth (age)	Caps	Club
1	GK	Jacques Songo'o (captain)	17 March 1964 (aged 33)		(Spain) Deportivo La Coruña
2	DF	Ernest Etchi	4 June 1975 (aged 22)		(Cameroon) Coton Sport
3	DF	Pierre Wome	26 March 1979 (aged 18)		(Italy) Lucchese
4	DF	Tobie Mimboe	30 June 1964 (aged 33)		(Turkey) Gençlerbirliği
5	DF	Raymond Kalla	22 April 1975 (aged 22)		(Greece) Panachaiki
6	MF	Geremi	20 December 1978 (aged 19)		(Turkey) Gençlerbirliği
7	FW	Bernard Tchoutang	2 September 1976 (aged 21)		(Netherlands) Roda JC
8	DF	Romarin Billong	11 June 1970 (aged 27)		(France) Saint-Étienne
9	FW	Alphonse Tchami	14 February 1971 (aged 26)		(Germany) Hertha BSC
10	FW	Patrick M'Boma	15 November 1970 (aged 27)		(Japan) Gamba Osaka
11	MF	Cyrille Mangan	13 September 1976 (aged 21)		(Greece) Skoda Xanthi
12	MF	Augustine Simo	18 September 1978 (aged 19)		(France) Saint-Étienne
13	DF	Lucien Mettomo	19 April 1977 (aged 20)		(France) Saint-Étienne
14	FW	Patrick Suffo	17 January 1978 (aged 20)		(France) Nantes
15	MF	Marc-Vivien Foé	1 May 1975 (aged 22)		(France) Lens
16	GK	Vincent Ongandzi	22 November 1975 (aged 22)		(Cameroon) Stade Bandjoun
17	MF	Salomon Olembé	8 December 1980 (aged 17)		(France) Nantes
18	FW	Samuel Ipoua	1 March 1973 (aged 24)		(Austria) Rapid Wien
19	MF	Fabrice Moreau	7 October 1967 (aged 30)		(Spain) Rayo Vallecano
20	DF	Rigobert Song	1 July 1976 (aged 21)		(France) Metz
21	FW	Joseph-Désiré Job	1 December 1977 (aged 20)		(France) Lyon
22	GK	Alioum Boukar	3 January 1972 (aged 26)		(Turkey) Samsunspor

=== Algeria ===
Coach: Abderrahmane Mehdaoui

No.	Pos.	Player	Date of birth (age)	Caps	Club
1	GK	Abdesslam Benabdellah	12 January 1964 (aged 34)		(Morocco) Wydad Casablanca
2	DF	Fayçal Hamdani	13 July 1970 (aged 27)		(Algeria) USM Alger
3	DF	Abdelazziz Benhamlat	22 March 1974 (aged 23)		(Algeria) JS Kabylie
4	DF	Mahieddine Meftah	25 September 1968 (aged 29)		(Algeria) USM Alger
5	DF	Mounir Zeghdoud	18 November 1970 (aged 27)		(Algeria) USM Alger
6	MF	Billel Dziri	21 January 1972 (aged 26)		(Tunisia) Étoile du Sahel
7	FW	Lakhdar Adjali	18 July 1972 (aged 25)		(France) Martigues
8	MF	Moussa Saïb (c)	6 March 1969 (aged 28)		(England) Tottenham Hotspur
9	FW	Ishak Ali Moussa	27 December 1970 (aged 27)		(Algeria) CR Belcourt
10	FW	Abdelhafid Tasfaout	11 February 1969 (aged 28)		(France) Guingamp
11	FW	Kamel Kaci-Saïd	13 December 1967 (aged 30)		(France) Cannes
12	DF	Abdellatif Osmane	20 November 1968 (aged 29)		(Algeria) MC Oran
13	MF	Cheïkh Benzerga	18 November 1972 (aged 25)		(Algeria) MC Oran
14	DF	Kamel Habri	5 March 1976 (aged 21)		(Algeria) WA Tlemcen
15	DF	Ali Dahleb	25 August 1969 (aged 28)		(Algeria) WA Tlemcen
16	GK	Aomar Hamened	7 February 1969 (aged 29)		(Algeria) MC Alger
17	FW	Sid-Ahmed Benamara	9 July 1973 (aged 24)		(Algeria) MC Oran
18	MF	Billal Zouani	11 December 1969 (aged 28)		(Algeria) USM Blida
19	DF	Tarek Ghoul	6 January 1975 (aged 23)		(Algeria) USM Alger
20	MF	Salem Harcheche	24 July 1972 (aged 25)		(France) Martigues
21	FW	Kheireddine Kherris	8 May 1973 (aged 24)		(Algeria) WA Tlemcen
22	GK	Sid Ahmed Mahrez	15 December 1970 (aged 27)		(Algeria) JS Kabylie

=== Guinea ===
Coach: (Ukraine) Vladimir Muntyan

No.	Pos.	Player	Date of birth (age)	Caps	Club
1	GK	Saliou Diallo	20 December 1976 (aged 21)		(Belgium) Deinze
2	DF	Mohamed Ofei Sylla	15 August 1974 (aged 23)		(Egypt) Ismaily
3	MF	Abdoul Salam Sow	13 August 1970 (aged 27)		(Portugal) Belenenses
4	MF	Pablo Thiam	3 January 1974 (aged 24)		(Germany) 1. FC Köln
5	DF	Edgar Barbara Sylla	22 March 1970 (aged 27)		(France) Évry
6	DF	Mohammed Camara	25 June 1975 (aged 22)		(France) Le Havre
7	FW	Fodé Camara	9 December 1973 (aged 24)		(Belgium) Kortrijk
8	MF	Mohamed Lamine Sylla	22 February 1971 (aged 26)		(Scotland) Ayr United
9	FW	Souleymane Oularé	16 October 1972 (aged 25)		(Belgium) Genk
10	FW	Titi Camara (captain)	17 November 1972 (aged 25)		(France) Marseille
11	FW	Momo Soumah	20 April 1977 (aged 20)		(Tunisia) Étoile du Sahel
12	FW	Taifour Diané	1 November 1972 (aged 25)		(Germany) Homburg
13	DF	Sekou Oumar Dramé	23 December 1973 (aged 24)		(Poland) Lech Poznań
14	MF	Ousmane N'Gom Camara	26 May 1975 (aged 22)		(Belgium) Waregem
15	DF	Abdoul Karim Bangoura	9 February 1970 (aged 27)		(France) Amiens
16	GK	Abdallah Bah	30 November 1975 (aged 22)		(France) Île-Rousse
17	DF	Morlaye Soumah	4 November 1971 (aged 26)		(France) Bastia
18	DF	Maurice Camara	17 September 1977 (aged 20)		(Guinea) ASFAG
19	DF	Ousmane Fernández	4 February 1969 (aged 29)		(Guinea) ASFAG
20	MF	Alkhaly Soumah	6 April 1975 (aged 22)		(Ukraine) Karpaty Lviv
21	MF	Keffing Dioubaté	28 November 1975 (aged 22)		(France) Amiens
22	GK	Kemoko Camara	4 May 1975 (aged 22)		(Guinea) Kaloum Star

== Group B ==
=== Ghana ===
Coach: (Netherlands) Rinus Israel

No.	Pos.	Player	Date of birth (age)	Caps	Club
1	GK	Richard Kingson	13 July 1978 (aged 19)		(Turkey) Galatasaray
2	DF	Daniel Edusei	2 September 1980 (aged 17)		(Ghana) Ghapoha
3	DF	Princeton Owusu-Ansah	12 August 1976 (aged 21)		(Ghana) Ashanti Gold
4	DF	Samuel Kuffour	3 September 1976 (aged 21)		(Germany) Bayern Munich
5	DF	Eric Addo	12 November 1978 (aged 19)		(Belgium) Club Brugge
6	DF	Mohammed Gargo	19 June 1975 (aged 22)		(Italy) Udinese
7	MF	Patrick Allotey	13 December 1978 (aged 19)		(Netherlands) Feyenoord
8	MF	Alex Nyarko	15 October 1973 (aged 24)		(Germany) Karlsruher SC
9	FW	Emmanuel Tetteh	25 December 1974 (aged 23)		(Sweden) IFK Göteborg
10	FW	Abedi Pele (captain)	5 November 1964 (aged 33)		(Germany) 1860 Munich
11	MF	Charles Akonnor	12 March 1974 (aged 23)		(Germany) Fortuna Köln
12	FW	Peter Ofori-Quaye	21 March 1980 (aged 17)		(Greece) Olympiacos
13	DF	Emmanuel Osei Kuffour	6 April 1976 (aged 21)		(Ghana) Ebusua Dwarfs
14	DF	Edward Agyeman-Duah	17 October 1973 (aged 24)		(Ghana) Ashanti Gold
15	DF	Samuel Johnson	25 July 1973 (aged 24)		(Belgium) Anderlecht
16	GK	Simon Addo	11 December 1974 (aged 23)		(Greece) Kalamata
17	FW	Felix Aboagye	12 May 1975 (aged 22)		(Egypt) Al-Ahly
18	MF	Ablade Kumah	26 June 1970 (aged 27)		(Saudi Arabia) Al-Ittihad
19	DF	Foster Bastios	20 February 1975 (aged 22)		(Greece) Kalamata
20	MF	Richard Ackon	10 October 1978 (aged 19)		(Norway) Stabæk
21	FW	Arthur Moses	3 March 1973 (aged 24)		(France) Marseille
22	GK	Constance Mantey	31 August 1976 (aged 21)		(Ghana) Asante Kotoko

=== Tunisia ===
Coach: (Poland) Henryk Kasperczak

No.	Pos.	Player	Date of birth (age)	Caps	Club
1	GK	Sofiane Khabir	10 July 1964 (aged 33)		(Tunisia) Sfaxien
2	DF	Khaled Badra	8 April 1973 (aged 24)		(Tunisia) Espérance
3	DF	Sami Trabelsi (captain)	4 February 1968 (aged 30)		(Tunisia) Sfaxien
4	DF	Taoufik Hichri	8 January 1965 (aged 33)		(Tunisia) Espérance
5	DF	Mohamed Mkacher	25 May 1975 (aged 22)		(Tunisia) Étoile du Sahel
6	DF	Ferid Chouchane	19 April 1973 (aged 24)		(Tunisia) Étoile du Sahel
7	FW	Faouzi Rouissi	26 March 1971 (aged 26)		(Tunisia) Club Africain
8	MF	Zoubeir Baya	15 May 1971 (aged 26)		(Germany) SC Freiburg
9	FW	Riadh Jelassi	7 July 1971 (aged 26)		(Tunisia) Étoile du Sahel
10	MF	Kais Ghodhbane	7 January 1976 (aged 22)		(Tunisia) Étoile du Sahel
11	MF	Bechir Sahbani	22 October 1972 (aged 25)		(Tunisia) Espérance
12	MF	Sofiane Fekih	9 August 1969 (aged 28)		(Tunisia) Sfaxien
13	MF	Riadh Bouazizi	8 April 1973 (aged 24)		(Tunisia) Étoile du Sahel
14	MF	Sirajeddine Chihi	16 April 1970 (aged 27)		(Tunisia) Espérance
15	MF	Maher Zdiri	5 September 1970 (aged 27)		(Tunisia) Club Africain
16	GK	Radhouane Salhi	18 February 1967 (aged 30)		(Tunisia) Étoile du Sahel
17	DF	Tarek Thabet	16 August 1971 (aged 26)		(Tunisia) Espérance
18	FW	Mehdi Ben Slimane	1 January 1974 (aged 24)		(Germany) SC Freiburg
19	MF	Hassan Gabsi	23 February 1974 (aged 23)		(Tunisia) Espérance
20	DF	Sabri Jaballah	28 June 1973 (aged 24)		(Tunisia) Club Africain
21	FW	Ziad Tlemcani	10 May 1963 (aged 34)		(Tunisia) Espérance
22	GK	Ali Boumnijel	13 April 1966 (aged 31)		(France) Bastia

=== Togo ===
Coach: (Germany) Eberhard Vogel

No.	Pos.	Player	Date of birth (age)	Caps	Club
1	GK	Weke Nimombe	19 February 1974 (aged 23)		(Ghana) Ashanti Gold
2	DF	Messan Ametekodo	3 December 1974 (aged 23)		(Gabon) Mangasport
3	DF	Yao Senaya	18 October 1979 (aged 18)		(France) Cannes
4	DF	Massamasso Tchangai	8 August 1978 (aged 19)		(Tunisia) Bizertin
5	DF	Yaovi Abalo	26 June 1975 (aged 22)		(France) Amiens
6	DF	Ratei Takpara	12 June 1974 (aged 23)		(Tunisia) US Ben Guerdane
7	MF	Abdoulaye Loukoumanou	31 December 1973 (aged 24)		(France) Istres
8	MF	Lantame Ouadja	28 August 1977 (aged 20)		(Switzerland) Servette
9	FW	Kossi Miwodeka Noutsoudje	16 October 1977 (aged 20)		(Ghana) Ashanti Gold
10	FW	Bachirou Salou	15 September 1970 (aged 27)		(Germany) MSV Duisburg
11	FW	Franck Doté (captain)	15 December 1975 (aged 22)		(Gabon) Mangasport
12	MF	Komlan Assignon	20 January 1974 (aged 24)		(France) Cannes
13	MF	Chérif Touré Mamam	13 January 1978 (aged 20)		(Germany) 1. FC Nürnberg
14	MF	Kokouni Akpalo	12 December 1972 (aged 25)		(France) Sporting Toulon Var
15	DF	Kodjo Balogou	17 November 1976 (aged 21)		(Switzerland) Neuchâtel Xamax
16	GK	Kbati Ouadja	28 August 1977 (aged 20)		(Togo) Étoile Filante de Lomé
17	FW	Mohamed Kader	8 April 1979 (aged 18)		(Tunisia) Bizertin
18	DF	Amavi Agbobly-Atayi	25 December 1974 (aged 23)		(Togo) OC Agaza
19	MF	Rafael Patron Akakpo	1 December 1973 (aged 24)		Brunei
20	FW	Djima Oyawolé	18 October 1976 (aged 21)		(France) Lorient
21	MF	Abibou Tchagnao	23 May 1975 (aged 22)		(France) Sète
22	GK	Adantor Akakpo	21 September 1965 (aged 32)		(Togo) OC Agaza

=== Congo DR ===
Coach: Louis Watunda

No.	Pos.	Player	Date of birth (age)	Caps	Club
1	GK	Nkombe Tokala	26 March 1977 (aged 20)		(Democratic Republic of the Congo) Vita Club
2	DF	Papi Kimoto	22 July 1976 (aged 21)		(Democratic Republic of the Congo) Sodigraf
3	DF	Bijou Kisombe Mundaba	29 September 1976 (aged 21)		(Democratic Republic of the Congo) Sodigraf
4	DF	Mutamba Makenga	17 November 1975 (aged 22)		(Democratic Republic of the Congo) Sodigraf
5	DF	Mutamba Kabongo	9 December 1970 (aged 27)		(South Korea) Anyang Cheetahs
6	MF	Dandou Kibonge Selenge	30 May 1976 (aged 21)		(Belgium) Charleroi
7	FW	Banza Kasongo	26 June 1974 (aged 23)		(Democratic Republic of the Congo) Vita Club
8	MF	Roger Hitoto	24 February 1969 (aged 28)		(France) Lille
9	FW	Jerry Tondelua Mbuilua	27 February 1975 (aged 22)		(Belgium) Cercle Brugge
10	MF	Didier Simba-Ekanza (captain)	9 August 1969 (aged 28)		(Belgium) Beveren
11	MF	Botomotoito Skito Litimba	7 July 1977 (aged 20)		(Democratic Republic of the Congo) Vita Club
12	GK	Marcel Nkueni	12 April 1978 (aged 19)		(Democratic Republic of the Congo) Motemba Pembe
13	DF	Esele Bakasu	14 September 1974 (aged 23)		(Democratic Republic of the Congo) Vita Club
14	DF	Lokenge Mungongo	8 October 1978 (aged 19)		(Democratic Republic of the Congo) Motemba Pembe
15	MF	Epotele Bazamba	13 May 1976 (aged 21)		(Democratic Republic of the Congo) Dragons
16	FW	Kimemba Mbayo	23 April 1976 (aged 21)		(Democratic Republic of the Congo) Sodigraf
17	MF	Emeka Mamale	21 October 1977 (aged 20)		(Belgium) Charleroi
18	FW	Umba Kanokene			(Democratic Republic of the Congo) Mikishi
19	DF	Ndama Bapupa	30 June 1972 (aged 25)		(Belgium) Oostende
20	FW	Eddy Bembuena-Keve	21 December 1972 (aged 25)		(Belgium) Lommelse
21	MF	Badibanga Ilunga	16 June 1972 (aged 25)		(Democratic Republic of the Congo) Motemba Pembe
22	GK	Kapile Mtshipayi			(Democratic Republic of the Congo) Dragons

== Group C ==
=== South Africa ===
Coach: Jomo Sono

No.	Pos.	Player	Date of birth (age)	Caps	Club
1	GK	Brian Baloyi	16 March 1974 (aged 23)		(South Africa) Kaizer Chiefs
2	DF	Andrew Rabutla	21 November 1971 (aged 26)		(Greece) PAOK
3	DF	David Nyathi	22 March 1969 (aged 28)		(Switzerland) St. Gallen
4	DF	Willem Jackson	26 March 1972 (aged 25)		(South Africa) Orlando Pirates
5	DF	Mark Fish	14 March 1974 (aged 23)		(England) Bolton Wanderers
6	FW	Phil Masinga	28 June 1969 (aged 28)		(Italy) Bari
7	MF	Alex Bapela	4 October 1969 (aged 28)		(South Africa) Mamelodi Sundowns
8	MF	Dumisa Ngobe	5 March 1973 (aged 24)		(South Africa) Orlando Pirates
9	DF	Aaron Mokoena	25 November 1980 (aged 17)		(South Africa) Jomo Cosmos
10	MF	John Moshoeu	18 December 1965 (aged 32)		(Turkey) Fenerbahçe
11	FW	Helman Mkhalele	20 October 1969 (aged 28)		(Turkey) Kayserispor
12	FW	Brendan Augustine	26 November 1971 (aged 26)		(Austria) LASK Linz
13	FW	Pollen Ndlanya	22 May 1970 (aged 27)		(Turkey) Bursaspor
14	MF	Quinton Fortune	21 May 1977 (aged 20)		(Spain) Atlético Madrid
15	MF	Thabo Mooki	27 October 1974 (aged 23)		(South Africa) Kaizer Chiefs
16	GK	Simon Gopane	26 December 1970 (aged 27)		(South Africa) Bloemfontein Celtic
17	FW	Benni McCarthy	12 November 1977 (aged 20)		(Netherlands) Ajax
18	MF	John Moeti	30 August 1967 (aged 30)		(South Africa) Orlando Pirates
19	DF	Lucas Radebe (captain)	12 April 1969 (aged 28)		(England) Leeds United
20	MF	Brandon Silent	22 January 1973 (aged 25)		(South Africa) Orlando Pirates
21	MF	Themba Mnguni	16 December 1973 (aged 24)		(South Africa) Mamelodi Sundowns
22	GK	John Tlale	15 May 1967 (aged 30)		(South Africa) QwaQwa Stars

=== Angola ===
Coach: (Portugal) Professor Neca

No.	Pos.	Player	Date of birth (age)	Caps	Club
1	GK	Marito	30 September 1977 (aged 20)		(Angola) Petro de Luanda
2	DF	Bodunha	28 July 1974 (aged 23)		(Angola) Petro de Luanda
3	DF	Raul Barbosa	18 May 1972 (aged 25)		(Portugal) Felgueiras
4	DF	Hélder Vicente	30 September 1975 (aged 22)		(Angola) Primeiro de Agosto
5	DF	Neto	10 October 1971 (aged 26)		(Angola) Primeiro de Agosto
6	DF	Paulo Silva	5 May 1975 (aged 22)		(Portugal) Chaves
7	FW	Paulão	22 October 1969 (aged 28)		(Portugal) Académica de Coimbra
8	MF	Carlos Pedro (c)	6 April 1969 (aged 28)		(Portugal) Espinho
9	MF	Fernando Sousa	4 August 1967 (aged 30)		(Portugal) Campomaiorense
10	FW	Akwá	30 May 1977 (aged 20)		(Portugal) Académica de Coimbra
11	MF	Lito Vidigal	11 July 1969 (aged 28)		(Portugal) Belenenses
12	GK	Nando	27 January 1966 (aged 32)		(Angola) ASA
13	DF	Aurélio	18 April 1974 (aged 23)		(Portugal) Académica de Coimbra
14	FW	Quinzinho	4 March 1974 (aged 23)		(Portugal) Rio Ave
15	GK	Simão	14 March 1962 (aged 35)		(Angola) Progresso da Lunda Sul
16	MF	Zito	3 July 1971 (aged 26)		(Portugal) Chaves
17	MF	Luís Miguel	22 July 1971 (aged 26)		(Portugal) Sporting CP
18	MF	Miguel Pereira	23 August 1975 (aged 22)		(Germany) Schalke 04
19	MF	Cacharamba	14 August 1973 (aged 24)		(Angola) Petro de Luanda
20	DF	Julião Kutonda	5 April 1965 (aged 32)		(Angola) Primeiro de Agosto
21	MF	Francisco Assis	25 December 1974 (aged 23)		(Angola) Primeiro de Agosto
22	MF	Lázaro Oliveira	27 August 1967 (aged 30)		(Portugal) Estrela da Amadora

=== Cote d'Ivoire ===
Coach: (France) Robert Nouzaret

No.	Pos.	Player	Date of birth (age)	Caps	Club
1	GK	Alain Gouaméné	15 June 1966 (aged 31)		(France) Toulouse
2	MF	Ibrahima Diomandé	28 October 1969 (aged 28)		(Ivory Coast) ASEC Abidjan
3	DF	Patrice Zere	20 December 1970 (aged 27)		(Belgium) Harelbeke
4	MF	Lassina Diabaté	16 September 1974 (aged 23)		(France) Bordeaux
5	DF	Ghislain Akassou	15 February 1975 (aged 22)		(Ivory Coast) ASEC Abidjan
6	DF	Lassina Dao	6 February 1972 (aged 26)		(Ivory Coast) Africa Sports
7	FW	Joël Tiéhi (captain)	12 June 1964 (aged 33)		(France) Toulouse
8	DF	Didier Angan	27 August 1974 (aged 23)		(France) Nice
9	FW	Bonaventure Kalou	12 January 1978 (aged 20)		(Netherlands) Feyenoord
10	FW	Moussa Traoré	25 December 1971 (aged 26)		(France) Créteil
11	MF	Ibrahima Koné	26 July 1969 (aged 28)		(Ghana) Ashanti Gold
12	GK	Losseni Konaté	29 December 1972 (aged 25)		(Ivory Coast) ASEC Abidjan
13	MF	Aliou Siby Badra	26 February 1971 (aged 26)		(Ivory Coast) ASEC Abidjan
14	MF	Tchiressoua Guel	27 December 1975 (aged 22)		(Ivory Coast) ASEC Abidjan
15	FW	Sob Evariste Dibo	27 December 1968 (aged 29)		(Portugal) Rio Ave
16	GK	Seydou Diarra	16 April 1968 (aged 29)		(Ivory Coast) ASEC Abidjan
17	DF	Cyril Domoraud	22 July 1971 (aged 26)		(France) Marseille
18	FW	Ahmed Ouattara	15 December 1969 (aged 28)		(Switzerland) Sion
19	DF	Blaise Kouassi	2 February 1974 (aged 24)		(Ivory Coast) ASEC Abidjan
20	FW	Ibrahima Bakayoko	31 December 1976 (aged 21)		(France) Montpellier
21	MF	Donald-Olivier Sie	3 April 1970 (aged 27)		(Ivory Coast) ASEC Abidjan
22	DF	Saliou Lassissi	15 August 1978 (aged 19)		(France) Rennes

=== Namibia ===
Coach: Ruston Mogane

No.	Pos.	Player	Date of birth (age)	Caps	Club
1	GK	Fillemon Kanalelo (captain)	23 May 1971 (aged 26)		(South Africa) Mamelodi Sundowns
2	DF	Petrus Haraseb	1 June 1968 (aged 29)		(Namibia) Liverpool
3	DF	Sylvanus Njambari	28 August 1974 (aged 23)		(Namibia) Black Africa
4	MF	Frans Ananias	1 December 1972 (aged 25)		(Germany) Penzberg
5	DF	Bimbo Tjihero	1 December 1969 (aged 28)		(Namibia) Liverpool
6	MF	Silvester Goraseb	7 September 1974 (aged 23)		(Namibia) Black Africa
7	MF	Sandro De Gouveia	28 July 1968 (aged 29)		(Namibia) Blue Waters
8	FW	Gervatius Uri Khob	3 April 1972 (aged 25)		(Namibia) Chief Santos
9	FW	Ruben Van Wyk	16 June 1976 (aged 21)		(Namibia) Liverpool
10	MF	Ricardo Mannetti	24 April 1975 (aged 22)		(South Africa) Santos
11	FW	Berlin Auchumeb	9 January 1974 (aged 24)		(Namibia) Chief Santos
12	MF	Mohammed Ouseb	17 July 1974 (aged 23)		(Namibia) Chief Santos
13	DF	Simon Uutoni	10 February 1970 (aged 27)		(Namibia) Liverpool
14	DF	Stanley Goagoseb	7 March 1967 (aged 30)		(Namibia) Civics
15	MF	Johannes Hindjou	8 November 1976 (aged 21)		(Namibia) Liverpool
16	GK	Petrus Andjamba	4 July 1973 (aged 24)		(Namibia) MP Tigers
17	DF	Robert Nauseb	23 August 1973 (aged 24)		(Namibia) Civics
18	FW	Eliphas Shivute	27 September 1974 (aged 23)		(Scotland) Motherwell
19	DF	Phillip Gariseb	6 September 1973 (aged 24)		(Germany) Penzberg
20	FW	Fillemon Angula	20 August 1974 (aged 23)		(Namibia) Oshakati City
21	GK	Danzyl Bruwer	5 November 1976 (aged 21)		(Namibia) Civics
22	MF	Johannes Jossop			(Namibia) Black Africa

== Group D ==
=== Zambia ===
Coach: (Germany) Burkhard Ziese replaced by George Mungwa for last match.

No.	Pos.	Player	Date of birth (age)	Caps	Club
1	GK	James Phiri	13 February 1968 (aged 29)		(Zambia) Zanaco
2	MF	Tenant Chilumba	22 August 1972 (aged 25)		(Saudi Arabia) Al Taawon
3	FW	Dennis Lota	8 December 1973 (aged 24)		(South Africa) Witbank Black Aces
4	FW	Masauso Tembo	25 February 1978 (aged 19)		(Zambia) Zamsure
5	MF	John Lungu	12 June 1966 (aged 31)		(Zambia) Roan United
6	MF	Mumamba Numba	21 March 1978 (aged 19)		(Zambia) Konkola Blades
7	DF	Hillary Makasa	12 January 1975 (aged 23)		(Zambia) Roan United
8	DF	Harrison Chongo	5 June 1969 (aged 28)		(Saudi Arabia) Al Taawon
9	DF	Elijah Litana	5 December 1970 (aged 27)		(Saudi Arabia) Al-Hilal
10	MF	Kenneth Malitoli	20 August 1966 (aged 31)		Unattached
11	FW	Kalusha Bwalya (captain)	16 August 1963 (aged 34)		(Mexico) Club León
12	GK	Davies Phiri	1 April 1976 (aged 21)		(Zambia) Kabwe Warriors
13	MF	Maybin Chisanga	4 March 1971 (aged 26)		(Zambia) Power Dynamos
14	FW	Frazier Kamwandi	10 March 1972 (aged 25)		(Zambia) Nkana Red Devils
15	DF	Allan Kamwanga	30 October 1968 (aged 29)		(Zambia) Mufulira Wanderers
16	MF	Andrew Tembo	19 August 1971 (aged 26)		(Denmark) Odense
17	DF	Peter Chitila	8 September 1971 (aged 26)		(Zambia) Power Dynamos
18	FW	Sylvester Musonda	20 December 1973 (aged 24)		(Zambia) Kalulushi Modern Stars
19	MF	Roatson Kilambe	6 August 1978 (aged 19)		(Zambia) Power Dynamos
20	DF	Mordon Malitoli	5 August 1968 (aged 29)		(Zambia) Nkana Red Devils
21	DF	Moses Sichone	31 May 1977 (aged 20)		(Zambia) Nchanga Rangers
22	GK	Collins Mbulo	15 January 1970 (aged 28)		(Zambia) Mufulira Wanderers

=== Morocco ===
Coach: (France) Henri Michel

No.	Pos.	Player	Date of birth (age)	Caps	Club
1	GK	Abdelkader El Brazi	5 November 1964 (aged 33)		(Morocco) FAR Rabat
2	DF	Abdelilah Saber	21 April 1974 (aged 23)		(Portugal) Sporting CP
3	DF	Abdelkarim El Hadrioui	6 March 1972 (aged 25)		(Portugal) Benfica
4	DF	Youssef Rossi	28 June 1973 (aged 24)		(France) Rennes
5	DF	Smahi Triki	1 August 1967 (aged 30)		(Switzerland) Lausanne
6	DF	Noureddine Naybet (captain)	10 February 1970 (aged 27)		(Spain) Deportivo La Coruña
7	MF	Mustapha Hadji	16 November 1971 (aged 26)		(Spain) Deportivo La Coruña
8	MF	Saïd Chiba	28 September 1970 (aged 27)		(Spain) Compostela
9	FW	Youssef Fertout	7 July 1970 (aged 27)		(Portugal) Belenenses
10	FW	Abderrahim Ouakili	11 December 1970 (aged 27)		(Germany) 1860 Munich
11	FW	Ali El-Khattabi	17 January 1977 (aged 21)		(Netherlands) Heerenveen
12	GK	Driss Benzekri	31 December 1970 (aged 27)		(Morocco) RS Settat
13	FW	Ahmed Bahja	21 December 1970 (aged 27)		(Saudi Arabia) Al-Ittihad
14	FW	Salaheddine Bassir	5 September 1972 (aged 25)		(Spain) Deportivo La Coruña
15	DF	Lahcen Abrami	31 December 1969 (aged 28)		(Morocco) Wydad Casablanca
16	MF	Rachid Azzouzi	10 January 1971 (aged 27)		(Germany) Greuther Fürth
17	MF	Abdellatif Jrindou	1 October 1974 (aged 23)		(Morocco) Raja Casablanca
18	MF	Youssef Chippo	10 May 1973 (aged 24)		(Portugal) Porto
19	FW	Abdeljalil Hadda	23 January 1972 (aged 26)		(Tunisia) Club Africain
20	MF	Mustapha Khalif	19 September 1964 (aged 33)		(Morocco) Raja Casablanca
21	MF	Taher El Khalej	16 June 1968 (aged 29)		(Portugal) Benfica
22	GK	Driss El-Asmar	4 December 1975 (aged 22)		(Morocco) Difaa El Jadida

=== Egypt ===
Coach: Mahmoud El-Gohary

No.	Pos.	Player	Date of birth (age)	Caps	Club
1	GK	Nader El-Sayed	13 December 1972 (aged 25)		(Egypt) Zamalek
2	DF	Abdel-Zaher El-Saqqa	30 January 1974 (aged 24)		(Egypt) El Mansoura
3	MF	Mohamed Emara	10 June 1974 (aged 23)		(Egypt) Al-Ahly
4	DF	Hany Ramzy	10 March 1969 (aged 28)		(Germany) Werder Bremen
5	DF	Samir Kamouna	2 April 1972 (aged 25)		(Egypt) Al-Ahly
6	DF	Medhat Abdel-Hady	12 July 1974 (aged 23)		(Egypt) Zamalek
7	DF	Mohamed Youssef	9 October 1970 (aged 27)		(Egypt) Al-Ahly
8	MF	Yasser Radwan	22 April 1972 (aged 25)		(Germany) Hansa Rostock
9	FW	Hossam Hassan (captain)	10 August 1966 (aged 31)		(Egypt) Al-Ahly
10	MF	Abdel Sattar Sabry	19 June 1974 (aged 23)		(Austria) Tirol Innsbruck
11	MF	Yasser Rayyan	26 March 1970 (aged 27)		(Egypt) Al-Ahly
12	MF	Hady Khashaba	19 December 1972 (aged 25)		(Egypt) Al-Ahly
13	FW	Walid Salah	11 November 1977 (aged 20)		(Egypt) El Mansoura
14	MF	Hazem Emam	10 May 1975 (aged 22)		(Italy) Udinese
15	MF	Amr Fahim	4 October 1976 (aged 21)		(Egypt) Aswan
16	GK	Essam El-Hadary	15 January 1973 (aged 25)		(Egypt) Al-Ahly
17	MF	Ahmed Hassan	2 May 1975 (aged 22)		(Egypt) Ismaily
18	FW	Mohamed Abdelnasser			(Egypt) Al-Mokawloon al-Arab
19	DF	Sami El-Sheshini	23 January 1972 (aged 26)		(Egypt) Zamalek
20	MF	Tarek Mostafa	1 April 1971 (aged 26)		(Egypt) Zamalek
21	FW	Osama Nabih	20 January 1975 (aged 23)		(Egypt) Zamalek
22	GK	Ahmed Saber	11 April 1968 (aged 29)		(Egypt) Al-Mokawloon al-Arab

=== Mozambique ===
Coach: Arnaldo Salvado

No.	Pos.	Player	Date of birth (age)	Caps	Club
1	GK	Helder Cossa	26 September 1969 (aged 28)		(Mozambique) Maxaquene
2	DF	Sérgio Faife	26 April 1970 (aged 27)		(Mozambique) Costa do Sol
3	DF	Zé Augusto	18 April 1968 (aged 29)		(Mozambique) Costa do Sol
4	DF	Adino	15 June 1977 (aged 20)		(Mozambique) Costa do Sol
5	DF	Tomás Inguana	13 January 1973 (aged 25)		(Mozambique) Ferroviário
6	MF	Antonio Trigo	22 November 1976 (aged 21)		(Mozambique) Ferroviário
7	DF	Jojó	6 September 1970 (aged 27)		(Portugal) Belenenses
8	FW	Nuro Tualibudane	19 October 1973 (aged 24)		(Cyprus) Alki Larnaca
9	MF	Nana	11 September 1967 (aged 30)		(Mozambique) Costa do Sol
10	FW	Chiquinho Conde (captain)	22 November 1965 (aged 32)		(Portugal) Vitória de Setúbal
11	FW	Avelino	20 July 1977 (aged 20)		(Portugal) Dragões Sandinenses
12	GK	Rui Evora	11 August 1970 (aged 27)		(Mozambique) Costa do Sol
13	MF	Mavó	4 October 1971 (aged 26)		(Mozambique) Ferroviário
14	DF	Pinto Barros	4 May 1973 (aged 24)		(Mozambique) Ferroviário
15	MF	Mário Artur	14 May 1969 (aged 28)		(Portugal) União de Leiria
16	MF	Salvador Macamo	27 September 1976 (aged 21)		(Mozambique) Maxaquene
17	MF	Jossias Macamo	26 January 1976 (aged 22)		(Mozambique) Costa do Sol
18	FW	Tico-Tico	16 August 1973 (aged 24)		(South Africa) Jomo Cosmos
19	FW	Dário	27 February 1977 (aged 20)		(Portugal) Académica de Coimbra
20	DF	José Albino Vino	23 June 1975 (aged 22)		(Mozambique) Ferroviário
21	DF	João Chissano	26 July 1970 (aged 27)		(Mozambique) Costa do Sol
22	GK	Luisinho Dias	14 April 1973 (aged 24)		(Mozambique) Ferroviário
