= Akakpo =

Akakpo is a surname. Notable people with the surname include:

- Adantor Akakpo (born 1965), Togolese footballer
- Comlanvi Akakpo (born 1985), Beninese footballer
- Izak Akakpo (born 2004), Togolese footballer
- Koffi C. Akakpo, Togolese academic administrator
- Serge Akakpo (born 1987), Togolese footballer
- Stella Akakpo (born 1994), French sprinter
- Wilson Akakpo (born 1992), Togolese footballer
