= CR Belouizdad in African football =

Algerian Professional Association Footballer

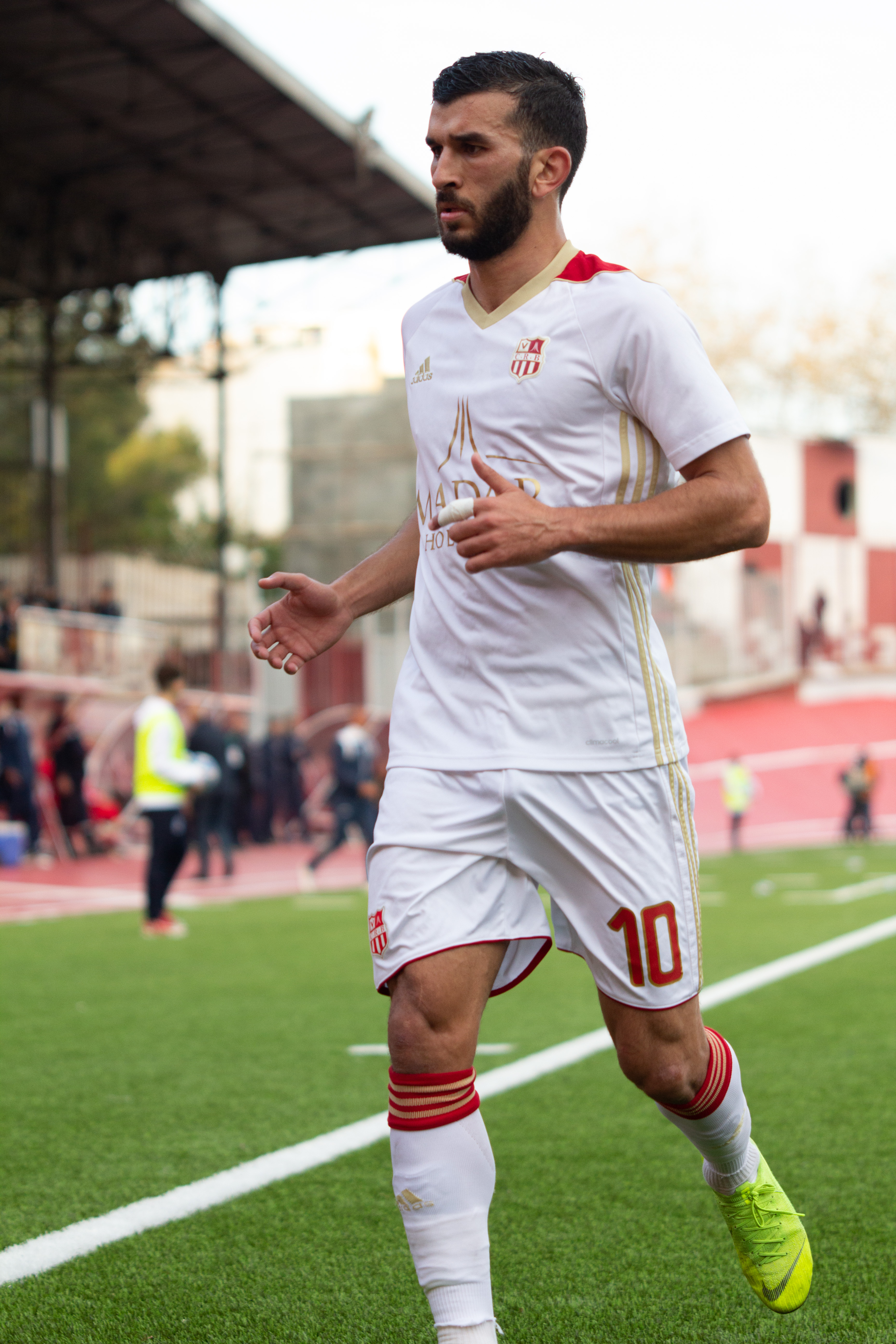
- Amir Sayoud the best scorer in the club
- Club: CR Belouizdad
- Most appearances: Sofiane Bouchar 42
- Top scorer: Amir Sayoud 11
- First entry: 1970 African Cup of Champions Clubs
- Latest entry: 2025–26 CAF Confederation Cup

CR Belouizdad, an Algerian professional association football club, has gained entry to Confederation of African Football (CAF) competitions on several occasions. They have represented Algeria in the Champions League on four occasions, the Confederation Cup on four occasions and the now-defunct Cup Winners' Cup on two occasions.

== History ==
CR Belouizdad whose team has regularly taken part in Confederation of African Football (CAF) competitions. Qualification for Algerian clubs is determined by a team's performance in its domestic league and cup competitions, CR Belouizdad have regularly qualified for the primary African competition, the African Cup, by winning the Ligue Professionnelle 1. CR Belouizdad have also achieved African qualification via the Algerian Cup and have played in the former African Cup Winners' Cup. the first match was against ASC Jeanne d'Arc and ended in victory for CR Belouizdad 5–3 but in the second leg, CR Belouizdad did not move to Senegal for unknown reasons. As for the biggest win result was in 1996 against Horoya AC 5–2, and biggest loss was in 2001 against ASEC Mimosas 7–0, The best participation was in 1996 in the African Cup Winners' Cup, when the team reached the semi-finals and was eliminated against AC Sodigraf.

After a difficult season that did not end due to the COVID-19 pandemic in Algeria. it was announced that CR Belouizdad had won the league title for the first time in 20 years and returned to participate in the CAF Champions League Qualifying to the group stage was easy by beating Al Nasr and Gor Mahia back and forth. where the draw was placed in a difficult group with Mamelodi Sundowns, TP Mazembe and Al Hilal. Despite the difficult start but in the last two rounds CR Belouizdad managed to win against TP Mazembe and Mamelodi Sundowns to qualify for the quarter-finals. to face Espérance de Tunis and defeat by penalty kicks 3–2.

== CAF competitions ==
CR Belouizdad results in CAF competition
Season	Competition	Round	Opposition	Home	Away	Aggregate	Ref.
1970	Cup of Champions Clubs	First round	(Senegal) ASC Jeanne d'Arc	5–3	canc.^{2}	5–3	
1979	Cup Winners' Cup	Second round	(Libya) Al-Nasr	4–2	1–0	5–2	
1979	Cup Winners' Cup	Quarterfinals	(Guinea) Horoya AC	0–3	1–3	1–6	
1996	Cup Winners' Cup	First round	(Guinea) Horoya AC	5–2	0–2	5–4	
1996	Cup Winners' Cup	Second round	(Senegal) AS Douanes	2–0	0–0	2–0	
1996	Cup Winners' Cup	Quarter-finals	(South Africa) Pretoria City FC	Walkover			
1996	Cup Winners' Cup	Semi-finals	(Zaire) AC Sodigraf	1–1	0–1	1–2	
2001	Champions League	First round	(Libya) Al-Ahly	2–0	1–1	3–1	
2001	Champions League	Second Round	(Sudan) Al-Merrikh	3–0	0–2	3–2	
2001	Champions League	Group stage	(Angola) Petro Atlético	0–1	1–2	4th place	
2001	Champions League	Group stage	(Egypt) Al Ahly	0–1	0–1	4th place	
2001	Champions League	Group stage	(Ivory Coast) ASEC Mimosas	1–1	0–7	4th place	
2002	Champions League	First round	(Senegal) ASC Jeanne d'Arc	1–1	0–1	1–2	
2004	Confederation Cup	First round	(Guinea) Etoile Guinee	2–1	0–1	2–2 (a)	
2010	Confederation Cup	Preliminary Round	(Libya) Tersanah	2–1	1–1	3–2	
2010	Confederation Cup	First round	(Morocco) FAR Rabat	1–0	1–1	2–1	
2010	Confederation Cup	Second Round	(Sudan) Amal Atbara	2–0	0–1	2–1	
2010	Confederation Cup	Second Round of 16	(Mali) Djoliba AC	1–1	0–0	1–1 (a)	
2018	Confederation Cup	Preliminary Round	(Mali) Onze Créateurs	2–0	1–1	3–1	
2018	Confederation Cup	First round	(Zambia) Nkana	3–0	0–1	3–1	
2018	Confederation Cup	Second Round	(Ivory Coast) ASEC Mimosas	0–0	0–1	0–1	
2019–20	Confederation Cup	Preliminary Round	(Chad) AS CotonTchad	2–0	2–0	4–0	
2019–20	Confederation Cup	First round	(Egypt) Pyramids	0–1	1–1	1–2	
2020–21	Champions League	Preliminary Round	(Libya) Al Nasr	2–0	2–0	4–0	
2020–21	Champions League	First round	(Kenya) Gor Mahia	6–0	2–1	8–1	
2020–21	Champions League	Group stage	(Democratic Republic of the Congo) TP Mazembe	2–0	0–0	2nd place	
2020–21	Champions League	Group stage	(South Africa) Mamelodi Sundowns	1–5 (Note: The CR Belouizdad v Mamelodi Sundowns match, originally scheduled to be played at Stade du 5 Juillet, Algiers on 24 February 2021, was postponed due to restrictions related to the COVID-19 pandemic imposed by Algeria on travelers from South Africa out of concern of the variant 501.V2. The match was later rescheduled to be played outside Algeria on 28 February 2021 at National Stadium, Dar es Salaam (Tanzania).)	2–0	2nd place	
2020–21	Champions League	Group stage	(Sudan) Al Hilal	1–1	0–0	2nd place	
2020–21	Champions League	Quarter-finals	(Tunisia) Espérance de Tunis	2–0	0–2	2–2 (2–3 p)	
2021–22	Champions League	First round	(Nigeria) Akwa United	2–0	0–1	2–1	
2021–22	Champions League	Second round	(Ivory Coast) ASEC Mimosas	2–0	1–3	3–3 (a)	
2021–22	Champions League	Group stage	(Tunisia) Étoile du Sahel	2–0	0–0	2nd place	
2021–22	Champions League	Group stage	(Tunisia) Espérance de Tunis	1–1	1–2	2nd place	
2021–22	Champions League	Group stage	(Botswana) Jwaneng Galaxy	4–1	2–1	2nd place	
2021–22	Champions League	Quarter-finals	(Morocco) Wydad AC	0–1	0–0	0–1	
2022–23	Champions League	First round	(Sierra Leone) Bo Rangers	3–0	0–0	3–0	
2022–23	Champions League	Second round	(Mali) Djoliba	2–0	1–2	3–2	
2022–23	Champions League	Group stage	(Egypt) Zamalek	2–0	1–0	2nd place	
2022–23	Champions League	Group stage	(Tunisia) Espérance de Tunis	0–1	0–0	2nd place	
2022–23	Champions League	Group stage	(Sudan) Al Merrikh	1–0	0–1	2nd place	
2022–23	Champions League	Quarter-finals	(South Africa) Mamelodi Sundowns	1–4	1–2	2–6	
2023–24	Champions League	Second round	(Sierra Leone) Bo Rangers	3–1	3–1	6–2	
2023–24	Champions League	Group stage	(Tanzania) Young Africans	3–0	0–4	3rd place	
2023–24	Champions League	Group stage	(Ghana) Medeama	3–0	1–2	3rd place	
2023–24	Champions League	Group stage	(Egypt) Al Ahly	0–0	0–0	3rd place	
2024–25	Champions League	First round	(Republic of the Congo) AC Léopards	1–0	2–0	3–0	
2024–25	Champions League	Second round	(Burkina Faso) AS Douanes	1–0	0–1	1–1 (a)	
2024–25	Champions League	Group stage	(South Africa) Orlando Pirates	1–2	1–2	3rd place	
2024–25	Champions League	Group stage	(Ivory Coast) Stade d'Abidjan	6–0	1–0	3rd place	
2024–25	Champions League	Group stage	(Egypt) Al Ahly	1–0	1–6	3rd place	
2025–26	Confederation Cup	Second Round	(Guinea) Hafia FC	2–0	1–1	3–1	
2025–26	Confederation Cup	Group stage	(South Africa) Stellenbosch FC	2–0	3–0	1st place	
2025–26	Confederation Cup	Group stage	(Tanzania) Singida BS	2–0	1–0	1st place	
2025–26	Confederation Cup	Group stage	(Republic of the Congo) AS Otohô	2–1	1–4	1st place	
2025–26	Confederation Cup	Quarter-finals	(Egypt) Al-Masry SC	0-0	1-1	1-1(a)	
2025–26	Confederation Cup	Semi-finals	(Egypt) Zamalek	0–1	0-0	0-1	

^{2} CR Belcourt withdrew

== Non-CAF competitions ==
Non-CAF competition record
Season	Competition	Round	Opposition	Score
1970	Maghreb Champions Cup	Semifinals	(Morocco) Wydad AC	0–0 (2–1 p) (August 20, 1955 Stadium, Algiers)
1970	Maghreb Champions Cup	Final	(Tunisia) CS Sfaxien	2–2 (4–3 p) (August 20, 1955 Stadium, Algiers)
1971	Maghreb Champions Cup	First leg	(Tunisia) Espérance de Tunis	2–2 (Tunis)
1971	Maghreb Champions Cup	Second leg	(Tunisia) Espérance de Tunis	3–2 (August 20, 1955 Stadium, Algiers)
1971	Maghreb Champions Cup	First leg	(Morocco) FAR de Rabat	3–0 (August 20, 1955 Stadium, Algiers)
1971	Maghreb Champions Cup	Second leg	(Morocco) FAR de Rabat	1–1 (Rabat)
1972	Maghreb Champions Cup	Semifinals	(Morocco) RS Settat	2–1 (Casablanca)
1972	Maghreb Champions Cup	Final	(Tunisia) CS Sfaxien	2–1 (Casablanca)
1973	Maghreb Champions Cup	Semifinals	(Morocco) AD Marocaines	0–0 (4–3 p) (Tunis)
1973	Maghreb Champions Cup	Final	(Tunisia) Étoile Sportive du Sahel	0–2 (Tunis)
1989	Arab Cup Winners' Cup	Group stage	Kuwait SC	0–0 (Prince Abdullah Al Faisal Stadium, Jeddah)
1989	Arab Cup Winners' Cup	Group stage	(Sudan) Al-Hilal Omdurman	0–1 (Prince Abdullah Al Faisal Stadium, Jeddah)
1989	Arab Cup Winners' Cup	Group stage	(Egypt) Zamalek SC	2–0 (Prince Abdullah Al Faisal Stadium, Jeddah)
1995	Arab Club Champions Cup	Group stage	(Saudi Arabia) Al-Nassr	1–0 (Riyadh)
1995	Arab Club Champions Cup	Group stage	(Jordan) Al-Wehdat	1–0 (Riyadh)
1995	Arab Club Champions Cup	Group stage	(Kuwait) Kazma	1–0 (Riyadh)
1995	Arab Club Champions Cup	Group stage	(Yemen) Al-Wehda	5–0 (Riyadh)
1995	Arab Club Champions Cup	Semifinals	(Tunisia) Espérance de Tunis	0–1(a.e.t.) (King Fahd Stadium, Riyadh)
2012–13	UAFA Club Cup	Second round	(Comoros) Steal Nouvel FC	0–3 (Sima, Comoros); 5–1 (August 20, 1955 Stadium, Algiers)
2012–13	UAFA Club Cup	Quarter-finals	(Egypt) Ismaily SC	1–1 (August 20, 1955 Stadium, Algiers); 1–1 (1–4 p) (30 June Stadium, Cairo)
2023	Arab Club Champions Cup	Group stage	(Morocco) Raja CA	1–2 (Prince Sultan bin Abdul Aziz Stadium, Abha)
2023	Arab Club Champions Cup	Group stage	(United Arab Emirates) Al-Wahda	1–2 (Prince Sultan bin Abdul Aziz Stadium, Abha)
2023	Arab Club Champions Cup	Group stage	Kuwait SC	1–1 (Damac Club Stadium, Khamis Mushait)

CR Belouizdad did not play the first leg and the result was awarded 3–0 to Steal Nouvel FC.

== Statistics ==
=== By season ===
Information correct as of 18 April 2026.
Key

- Pld = Played
- W = Games won
- D = Games drawn
- L = Games lost
- F = Goals for
- A = Goals against
- Grp = Group stage
- PR = Preliminary round
- R1 = First round
- R2 = Second round
- SR16 = Second Round of 16
- R16 = Round of 16
- QF = Quarter-final
- SF = Semi-final

Key to colours and symbols:

W	Winners
RU	Runners-up

CR Belouizdad record in African football by season
Season	Competition	Pld	W	D	L	GF	GA	GD	Round
1970	African Cup of Champions Clubs	1	1	0	0	5	3	+2	R1
1979	African Cup Winners' Cup	4	2	0	2	6	8	−2	QF
1996	African Cup Winners' Cup	6	2	2	2	8	6	+2	SF
2001	CAF Champions League	10	2	2	6	8	16	−8	Grp
2002	CAF Champions League	2	0	1	1	1	2	−1	R1
2004	CAF Confederation Cup	2	1	0	1	2	2	0	R1
2010	CAF Confederation Cup	8	3	4	1	8	5	+3	SR16
2018	CAF Confederation Cup	6	2	2	2	6	3	+3	R2
2019–20	CAF Confederation Cup	4	2	1	1	5	2	+3	R1
2020–21	CAF Champions League	12	7	3	2	20	9	+11	QF
2021–22	CAF Champions League	12	5	3	4	15	10	+5	QF
2022–23	CAF Champions League	12	5	2	5	12	10	+2	QF
2023–24	CAF Champions League	8	4	2	2	13	8	+5	Grp
2024–25	CAF Champions League	10	6	0	4	15	11	+4	Grp
2025–26	CAF Confederation Cup	12	6	4	2	15	8	+7	SF
Total		109	48	26	35	139	103	+36	

=== By competition ===
==== In Africa ====
As of 18 April 2026:

CAF competitions
Competition	Seasons	Played	Won	Drawn	Lost	Goals For	Goals Against	Last season played
Champions League	8	67	30	13	24	89	69	2024–25
CAF Confederation Cup	5	32	14	11	7	36	20	2025–26
CAF Cup Winners' Cup (defunct)	2	10	4	2	4	14	14	1996
Total	15	109	48	26	35	139	103	

==== Non-CAF competitions ====
Non-CAF competitions
Competition	Seasons	Played	Won	Drawn	Lost	Goals For	Goals Against	Last season played
Arab Champions League	2	9	5	2	2	15	7	2012–13
Arab Cup Winners' Cup (defunct)	1	3	1	1	1	2	1	1989
Maghreb Champions Cup (defunct)	4	10	4	5	1	15	11	1973
Total	7	22	10	8	4	32	19	

== Statistics by country ==
Statistics correct as of game against Zamalek on april 17, 2026

=== CAF competitions ===
Country	Club	P	W	D	L	GF	GA	GD
Angola	Petro Atlético	2	0	0	2	1	3	−2
Subtotal		2	0	0	2	1	3	−2
Botswana	Jwaneng Galaxy	2	2	0	0	6	2	+4
Subtotal		2	2	0	0	6	2	+4
Burkina Faso	AS Douanes	2	1	0	1	1	1	0
Subtotal		2	1	0	1	1	1	0
Chad	AS CotonTchad	2	2	0	0	4	0	+4
Subtotal		2	2	0	0	4	0	+4
Republic of the Congo	AC Léopards	2	2	0	0	3	0	+3
Republic of the Congo	AS Otohô	2	1	0	1	3	5	−2
Subtotal		4	3	0	1	6	5	+1
(Democratic Republic of the Congo) DR Congo	TP Mazembe	2	1	1	0	2	0	+2
(Democratic Republic of the Congo) DR Congo	AC Sodigraf	2	0	1	1	1	2	−1
Subtotal		4	1	2	1	3	2	+1
Egypt	Al Ahly	6	1	2	3	2	8	−6
Egypt	Pyramids	2	0	1	1	1	2	−1
Egypt	Zamalek	3	2	1	1	3	1	+2
Egypt	Al-Masry SC	2	0	2	0	1	1	+0
Subtotal		14	3	6	5	7	12	-5
Ghana	Medeama	2	1	0	1	4	2	+2
Subtotal		2	1	0	1	4	2	+2
Guinea	Etoile Guinee	2	1	0	1	2	2	0
Guinea	Horoya AC	4	1	0	3	6	10	−4
Guinea	Hafia FC	2	1	1	0	3	1	+2
Subtotal		8	3	1	4	11	13	−2
Ivory Coast	ASEC Mimosas	6	1	2	3	4	12	−8
Ivory Coast	Stade d'Abidjan	2	2	0	0	7	0	+7
Subtotal		8	3	2	3	11	12	−1
Kenya	Gor Mahia	2	2	0	0	8	1	+7
Subtotal		2	2	0	0	8	1	+7
Libya	Al-Ahly	2	1	1	0	3	1	+2
Libya	Tersanah	2	1	1	0	3	2	+1
Libya	Al-Nasr	4	4	0	0	9	2	+7
Subtotal		8	6	2	0	15	5	+10
Mali	Djoliba AC	4	1	2	1	4	3	+1
Mali	Onze Créateurs	2	1	1	0	3	1	+2
Subtotal		6	2	3	1	7	4	+3
Morocco	FAR Rabat	2	1	1	0	2	1	+1
Morocco	Wydad AC	2	0	1	1	0	1	−1
Subtotal		4	1	2	1	2	2	+0
Nigeria	Akwa United	2	1	0	1	2	1	+1
Subtotal		2	1	0	1	2	1	+1
Senegal	ASC Jeanne d'Arc	3	1	1	1	6	5	+1
Senegal	AS Douanes	2	1	1	0	2	0	+2
Subtotal		5	2	2	1	8	5	+3
Sierra Leone	Bo Rangers	4	3	1	0	9	2	+7
Subtotal		4	3	1	0	9	2	+7
South Africa	Mamelodi Sundowns	4	1	0	3	5	11	−6
South Africa	Orlando Pirates	2	0	0	2	2	4	−2
South Africa	Stellenbosch FC	2	2	0	0	5	0	+5
Subtotal		8	3	0	5	12	15	−3
Sudan	Amal Atbara	2	1	0	1	2	1	+1
Sudan	Al-Merrikh	4	2	0	2	4	3	+1
Sudan	Al Hilal	2	0	2	0	1	1	+0
Subtotal		8	3	2	3	7	5	+2
Tanzania	Young Africans	2	1	0	1	3	4	−1
Tanzania	Singida BS	2	2	0	0	3	0	+3
Subtotal		4	3	0	1	6	4	+2
Tunisia	Espérance	6	1	2	3	4	6	−2
Tunisia	Étoile du Sahel	2	1	1	0	2	0	+2
Subtotal		8	2	3	3	6	6	+0
Zambia	Nkana	2	1	0	1	3	1	+2
Subtotal		2	1	0	1	3	1	+2
Total		109	48	26	35	139	103	+36

=== Non-CAF competitions ===
Result summary by country
Country	Pld	W	D	L	GF	GA	GD
Comoros	2	1	0	1	5	4	+1
Egypt	3	1	2	0	4	2	+2
Jordan	1	1	0	0	1	0	+1
Kuwait	2	1	2	0	2	1	+1
Morocco	5	2	3	1	7	4	+3
Saudi Arabia	1	1	0	0	1	0	+1
Sudan	1	0	0	1	0	1	−1
Tunisia	6	2	2	2	9	10	−1
(United Arab Emirates) Emirates	1	0	0	1	1	2	−1
Yemen	1	1	0	0	5	0	+5
Total	25	10	9	6	35	24	+11

== African competitions goals ==
Statistics correct as of game against Stade d'Abidjan on January 18, 2025

List of CR Belouizdad players with 3 or more goals
Position	Player	TOTAL	CCL	CCC	CWC
1	(Algeria) Amir Sayoud	11	8	3	–
2	(Algeria) Ishak Ali Moussa	7	4	–	3
3	(Cameroon) Leonel Wamba	6	6	–	–
4	(Algeria) Mohamed Islam Belkhir	5	5	–	–
=	(Algeria) Raouf Benguit	5	5	–	–
6	(Algeria) Karim Aribi	4	4	–	–
=	(Algeria) Abderrahmane Meziane	4	4	–	–
8	(Algeria) Kheireddine Merzougui	3	3	–	–
=	(Algeria) Youcef Bechou	3	2	1	–
=	(Algeria) Chouaib Keddad	3	3	–	–
=	(Algeria) Sofiane Bouchar	3	3	–	–
Totals		106	86	20	0

=== Hat-tricks ===
N	Date	Player	Match	Score	Time of goals
1	4 May 1979	Hocine Ben Miloudi	CR Belouizdad – Al-Nasr SC Benghazi	4–2	7', 52', 64'
2	1996	Ishak Ali Moussa	CR Belouizdad – Horoya AC	5–2	
3	26 December 2020	Amir Sayoud	CR Belouizdad – Gor Mahia	6–0	6', 20'p, 52'
4	2 October 2023	Leonel Wamba	CR Belouizdad – Bo Rangers	3–1	78'p, 80', 90'

=== Two goals one match ===
N	Date	Player	Match	Score
1	11 April 1970	Hacène Lalmas	CR Belcourt – AS Jeanne d'Arc	5–3
2	27 May 2001	Ishak Ali Moussa	CR Belouizdad – Al-Merrikh	3–0
3	26 February 2022	Kheireddine Merzougui	Jwaneng Galaxy – CR Belouizdad	0–2
4	17 September 2023	Oussama Darfalou	Bo Rangers – CR Belouizdad	1–3
5	18 January 2025	Mohamed Islam Belkhir	CR Belouizdad – Stade d'Abidjan	6–1

== Non-CAF competitions goals ==
P	Player	Goals
=	(Algeria) Hamid Boudjenoun	4
=	(Algeria) Selmi Djillali	4
=	(Algeria) Islam Slimani	2
=	(Algeria) Hacène Lalmas	2
=	(Algeria) Amar Ammour	1
=	(Algeria) Mehdi Benaldjia	1

P	Player	Goals
=	(Benin) Pascal Angan	1
=	(Algeria) Mokhtar Khalem	1
=	(Nigeria) Onome Sodje	1
=	(Algeria) Mustapha Dahleb	1
=	(Algeria) Sofiane Harkat	1
=	(Algeria) Achour Hacène	1

P	Player	Goals
=	(Algeria) Mouad Hadded	1
=	(Algeria) Aimen Bouguerra	1
=	(Algeria) Mohamed Islam Belkhir	1
=	(Algeria) Salem Chekroun	1

== List of All-time appearances ==
This List of All-time appearances for CR Belouizdad in African competitions contains football players who have played for CR Belouizdad in African football competitions and have managed to accrue 20 or more appearances.

Gold Still playing competitive football in CR Belouizdad. (Note: Statistics correct as of game against Stade d'Abidjan on January 18, 2025.)

#	Name	Position	CL1	CCC	SC	TOTAL	Date of first cap	Debut against	Date of last cap	Final match against
1	(Algeria) Chouaib Keddad	CB	44	4	–	48	10 Aug 2019	AS CotonTchad	—	—
2	(Algeria) Sofiane Bouchar	CB	35	9	–	44	9 Feb 2018	Onze Créateurs	1 Mar 2024	Medeama
3	(Algeria) Housseyn Selmi	DM	38	4	–	42	10 Aug 2019	AS CotonTchad	12 Jan 2025	Orlando Pirates
4	(Algeria) Zakaria Draoui	DM	33	5	–	38	9 Feb 2018	Onze Créateurs	22 Apr 2023	Mamelodi Sundowns
5	(Algeria) Mohamed Islam Belkhir	LW	38	–	–	38	5 Mar 2021	Al Hilal	—	—
6	(Algeria) Mokhtar Belkhiter	RB	35	–	–	35	29 Nov 2020	Al Nasr	1 Mar 2024	Medeama
7	(Algeria) Mohamed Islam Bakir	LW	32	–	–	32	6 Jan 2021	Gor Mahia	1 Mar 2024	Medeama
8	(Algeria) Houssem Eddine Mrezigue	DM	30	–	–	30	6 Dec 2020	Al Nasr	1 Apr 2023	Espérance de Tunis
9	(Algeria) Chemseddine Nessakh	LB	20	4	–	24	10 Aug 2019	AS CotonTchad	23 Apr 2022	Wydad AC
