= Cossa =

- Pronunciation: Italian: [ˈkɔssa]
- Language: Italian, Portuguese

Origin
- Meaning: 1. short form of Bonaccorsa; 2. 'thigh' 3. 'Corsican' (feminine form of Cossu)

Other names
- Variant forms: del Cossa, Cosso

Cossa is a surname of Italian and Mozambican origin that may refer to:

- Albino Cossa (born 1982), Mozambican goalkeeper
- Alfonso Cossa (1833–1902), Italian chemist
- Anabela Cossa (born 1986), Mozambican basketball player
- Baldassare Cossa (c. 1370 – 1419), 14th-century Italian Roman Catholic bishop
- Celeste Cossa, 20th-century Mozambican women politician
- Dominic Cossa (1935–2024), American operatic lyric baritone
- Elisa Cossa (born 1980), Mozambican athlete
- Francesco del Cossa (c. 1430 – c. 1477), Italian Renaissance painter
- Gaetano Cossa (died 1657), 17th-century Italian Roman Catholic archbishop
- Giovanni Cossa (1400–1476), lieutenant general of Provence
- Helder Cossa (born 1969), Mozambican footballer
- Luigi Cossa (1831–1896), Italian economist
- Pietro Cossa (1830–1881), Italian dramatist
- Roberto Cossa (1934–2024), Argentine playwright and theatre director
- Sebastian Cossa (born 2002), Canadian ice hockey goaltender
