= Ndama (disambiguation) =

N'Dama is a breed of cattle.

Ndama may also refer to:

== Given name ==
- Ndama Bapupa (born 1972), Congolese footballer

== Surname ==
- Guy Nzouba-Ndama (born 1946), Gabonese politician, party leader, government minister, President of the National Assembly of Gabon (1997–2016)
- Solène Ndama (born 1998), French athlete of Gabonese descent specializing in 100m hurdles, heptathlon and pentathlon

== See also ==
- Ndaba
