= 1996 African Cup Winners' Cup final =

1996 CAF African Cup Winners' Cup Final
- Event: 1996 African Cup Winners' Cup
AC Sodigraf	Al Mokawloon Al Arab
(Zaire)	(Egypt)
0	4

First leg
AC Sodigraf	Al Mokawloon Al Arab
0	0
- Date: 24 November 1996
- Venue: Stade des Martyrs, Kinshasa
- Referee: Fethi Boucetta (Tunisia)
- Attendance: 10,000

Second leg
Al Mokawloon Al Arab	AC Sodigraf
4	0
- Date: 8 December 1996
- Venue: Cairo Stadium, Cairo
- Referee: Falla N'Doye (Senegal)
- Attendance: 40,000

The 1996 CAF African Cup Winners' Cup Final was contested in two-legged home-and-away format between AC Sodigraf from Zaire and Al Mokawloon Al Arab from Egypt, The first leg was hosted by AC Sodigraf at Stade des Martyrs in Kinshasa on 24 November 1996, while the second leg was hosted by Al Mokawloon Al Arab at Cairo International Stadium in Cairo on 8 December 1996.

Al Mokawloon Al Arab won 4–0 on aggregate, earned the right to participate in the 1997 CAF Super Cup against the other Egyptian team Zamalek; the winner of the 1996 African Cup of Champions Clubs.

== Match details ==
=== First leg ===
24 November 1996

AC Sodigraf (Zaire)	0 – 0	(Egypt) Al Mokawloon Al Arab

Stade des Martyrs, Kinshasa
Attendance: 10,000
Referee: Fethi Boucetta (Tunisia)

=== Second leg ===
8 December 1996

Al Mokawloon Al Arab (Egypt)	4 – 0	(Zaire) AC Sodigraf
Ashour 7', 54' (pen.); Ouda 25', 74'

Cairo International Stadium, Cairo
Attendance: 40,000
Referee: Falla N'Doye (Senegal)
