= Petrus Andjamba =

Namibian footballer (born 1973)

Personal information
- Date of birth: 4 July 1973 (age 53)
- Place of birth: Windhoek, South West Africa
- Position: Goalkeeper

Senior career*
Years	Team	Apps	(Gls)
1990–1993	African Blizzards		
1994–1990	United Africa Tigers		
2000	Young Ones		

International career
1996–1998	Namibia	6	(0)
- * Club domestic league appearances and goals

Petrus Andjamba (born 4 July 1973), also known as Dax Andjamba, is a Namibian former footballer who played as a goalkeeper. He played in six matches for the Namibia national football team from 1996 to 1998 and was part of Namibia's squad for the 1998 African Cup of Nations.

== Early life and education ==
Andjamba was born and raised in Windhoek, and was educated at Mandume Primary School, Namutoni Primary School and Immanuel Shifidi Secondary School, playing school football for all three schools and winning the Coca-Cola Schools Championships in 1992. He enrolled at Windhoek Vocational Training Centre in 1993 and qualified as bricklayer in 1994.

== Club career ==
Aged 17, Andjamba signed for Central First Division club African Blizzards, a feeder club of United Africa Tigers, before joining Tigers in 1994. He was initially second-choice goalkeeper to Ephraim Davids but became first choice at the club shortly after. He won the Namibia FA Cup with the club in 1995 and 1996 and also the Metropolitan Shield in 1996. Tigers' success in the FA Cup allowed the club to compete in the African Cup Winners' Cup in 1996 and 1997, being eliminated by AC Sodigraf of Zaire in the second round in 1996 and by Eleven Men in Flight in the preliminary round the following year. He later played for Young Ones before a spell as assistant coach at Tigers.

== International career ==
Andjamba played for the Namibia under-20 and under-23 teams and was a member of the a Tertiary Institutes Sports Association of Namibia team sent to Swaziland in 1993. He made his debut for the Namibia national team in a 6–0 win over Botswana on 25 August 1996. He was also named in Namibia's squad for the 1998 African Cup of Nations tournament. In total, he played in six matches for the Namibia national football team from 1996 to 1998.

== Personal life ==
Since retiring from football, Andjamba has worked as a safety, health and environmental wellness officer for NamPower. He married his girlfriend Madelaine in 2019 and has three children.
