= Bruwer =

Bruwer is a surname. Notable people with the surname include:

- Danzyl Bruwer (born 1976), Namibian footballer
- Driaan Bruwer (born 1995), South African cricketer
- Jacobus Albertus Bruwer (1915–), South African astronomer
- HJ Bruwer (born 2009) South Afrika

== See also ==
- Brewer (surname)
- 1811 Bruwer, main-belt asteroid
