= Gariseb =

Gariseb is a surname. Notable people with the surname include:

- Phillip Gariseb (born 1973), Namibian footballer
- Richard Gariseb (born 1980), Namibian footballer
