= Frans Ananias =

Namibian footballer (born 1972)

Personal information
- Full name: Frans Page Ananias
- Date of birth: 1 December 1972 (age 53)
- Position: Midfielder

Senior career*
Years	Team	Apps	(Gls)
1990–1993	African Blizzards		
1994–1997	United Africa Tigers		
1997–1998	FC Penzberg		
1998	African Stars		
1999	Young Ones		
2000–2007	United Africa Tigers		

International career
1994–1998	Namibia	30	(1)

Managerial career
- 2009: United Africa Tigers (caretaker)
Medal record
Men's football
Representing Namibia
COSAFA Cup
Runner-up	1997 Southern Africa
- * Club domestic league appearances and goals

Frans Page Ananias (born 1 December 1972) is a Namibian former footballer who played as a midfielder. He was capped 29 times by the Namibia national team and scored one goal, and played for Namibia at the 1998 African Cup of Nations. He played club football for African Blizzards, United Africa Tigers, African Stars and Young Ones in Namibia and FC Penzberg in Germany.

== Early life ==
Ananias was educated at Mandume Primary School, Opawa Junior Secondary School, Otjikoto Secondary School and Cosmos High School.

== Club career ==
Ananias started his career at Central First Division club African Blizzards, a feeder club of United Africa Tigers, before transferring to Tigers. He spent most of his career at the club, winning the Namibia FA Cup with the club in 1995 and 1996 and also the Metropolitan Shield in 1996, and he was also Tigers' top scorer in the 1995 season with 27 goals. He later had a year spell in German football with FC Penzberg, playing alongside fellow international players Phillip Gariseb and Erastus Gariseb. He later returned to Namibia and signed for African Stars in 1998. He later joined Young Ones, before returning to Tigers where he played until his retirement.

== International career ==
In 1987, Ananias represented a pre-independence Namibia at an under-15 tournament in Gqeberha. He made his international debut for Namibia in a 2–1 win over Ivory Coast in December 1994. He scored his first international goal in April 1995 against Botswana. In January 1998, Ananias was named in Namibia's final 22-man squad for the 1998 Africa Cup of Nations. Ananias made 1 appearance at the tournament. In total, he was capped 30 times by Namibia and scored once.

== Coaching career ==
Ananias worked as an assistant manager to Willem Kapukare at Tigers and, after Kapukare was sacked in February 2009, Ananias served as caretaker manager until Brian Isaacs was appointed in August 2009.

== Personal life ==
Ananias has two children. He now works as a medical courier for private laboratory company PathCare Namibia.

== Honours ==
Namibia

- COSAFA Cup: Runner-up, 1997
