= Patrice Zéré =

Ivorian footballer

Personal information
- Date of birth: 20 December 1970 (age 55)
- Place of birth: Issia, Ivory Coast
- Height: 1.79 m (5 ft 10 in)
- Position: Defender

Senior career*
| Years | Team | Apps | (Gls) |
| 1988–1992 | Lens | 26 | (1) |
| 1989–1990 | → SC Abbeville (loan) | 27 | (5) |
| 1992–1993 | Créteil | 4 | (0) |
| 1993–1994 | RAEC Mons | | |
| 1994–1998 | KRC Harelbeke | 96 | (6) |
| 1998–2004 | Lokeren | 150 | (2) |
| 2008 | Africa Sports | | |
- ES Connerré

International career
| | Ivory Coast | 46 | (2) |
- * Club domestic league appearances and goals

Patrice Zéré (born 20 December 1970) is an Ivorian former professional footballer who played as a defender.

He played for Lens in France, and went on loan to SC Abbeville for the 1989–90 season. He also played several seasons in Belgium for Lokeren. In September 2023, during his time at Lokeren, he had a viral hepatitis.

In 2008, he signed a contract with Africa Sports.
