= José Albino =

Mozambican footballer

Personal information
- Full name: José Albino Vino
- Date of birth: 23 June 1975 (age 51)
- Position: Defender

International career
Years	Team	Apps	(Gls)
1998–1999	Mozambique	14	(0)

José Albino (born 23 June 1975) is a Mozambican footballer. He played in 14 matches for the Mozambique national football team in 1998 and 1999. He was also named in Mozambique's squad for the 1998 African Cup of Nations tournament.
