= Sofiane Khabir =

Tunisian footballer

Personal information
- Date of birth: 10 July 1964 (age 62)

International career
| Years | Team | Apps | (Gls) |
| 1997 | Tunisia | 2 | (0) |

Sofiane Khabir (born 10 July 1964) is a Tunisian footballer. He played in two matches for the Tunisia national football team in 1997. He was also named in Tunisia's squad for the 1998 African Cup of Nations tournament.
