= Comlanvi Akakpo =

Beninese football player (born 1985)

Comlanvi Akakpovi
Personal information
- Full name: Comlanvi Akakpo
- Date of birth: 30 January 1985 (age 41)
- Place of birth: Lomé, Togo
- Height: 1.78 m (5 ft 10 in)
- Position: Defender

Team information
- Current team: Tonnerre d'Abomey FC
- Number: 85

Youth career
- 2002–2004: Etoile Filante de Lomé

Senior career*
Years	Team	Apps	(Gls)
2005–2006	Etoile Filante de Lomé	17	(5)
2007–	Tonnerre d'Abomey FC	28	(0)

International career
2008–	Benin	33	(1)
- * Club domestic league appearances and goals

Comlanvi Akakpo (born 30 January 1985 in Lomé) is a Beninese football player who currently plays in Benin for Tonnerre d'Abomey FC.

== Career ==
He began his career in his native Togo for Etoile Filante de Lomé and signed in January 2007 for Tonnerre d'Abomey FC.

== International career ==
Akakpo is in the extended squad from the Benin national football team and represented the team at 2010 African Cup of Nations in Angola.
