= Abibou Tchagnao =

Togolese footballer

Personal information
- Date of birth: 23 May 1975 (age 51)
- Place of birth: Abafilo, Togo
- Height: 1.73 m (5 ft 8 in)
- Position: Defender

Senior career*
Years	Team	Apps	(Gls)
1994–1996	FC Martigues B		
1995–1997	FC Martigues		
1997–1999	FC Sète		
1999–2000	FC Concordia Basel		
2000–2001	FC Wangen bei Olten		
2001–2002	FC Concordia Basel		
2002–2004	FC Solothurn		
2004–2005	FC Alle		
2005–2006	SO Cassis Carnoux		

International career^{‡}
1996–2001	Togo	9	(0)
- * Club domestic league appearances and goals as of 1 August 2020 ‡ National team caps and goals as of 1 August 2020

Abibou Tchagnao (born 23 May 1975) is a retired Togolese football defender. He was a squad member for the 1998 and 2000 African Cup of Nations.
