= Messan Ametekodo =

Togolese footballer

Personal information
- Date of birth: 3 December 1974 (age 51)
- Position: Defender

Senior career*
Years	Team	Apps	(Gls)
- AS Mangasport
- Dynamic Togolais

International career^{‡}
1992–2001	Togo		
- * Club domestic league appearances and goals as of 1 August 2020 ‡ National team caps and goals as of 1 August 2020

Messan Ametekodo (born 3 December 1974) is a retired Togolese football defender. He was a squad member for the 1998 and 2000 Africa Cup of Nations.
