= Zito (footballer, born 1971) =

Angolan footballer

Personal information
- Full name: Helmer da Piedade Rosa
- Date of birth: 3 July 1971 (age 55)
- Place of birth: Malanje, Angola
- Height: 1.68 m (5 ft 6 in)
- Position: Left winger

Youth career
- Amora
- Ginásio Corroios
- Amora

Senior career*
Years	Team	Apps	(Gls)
1990–1991	Amora		
1991–1992	Seixal		
1992–1993	Malveira	30	(13)
1993–1994	Vitória de Guimarães	9	(0)
1994–1995	Chaves	27	(2)
1995–1996	Paços de Ferreira	26	(3)
1996–1997	Belenenses	25	(4)
1997–1998	Chaves	3	(0)
1998–1999	Belenenses	20	(1)
1999–2000	Espinho	21	(5)
2000–2001	Paredes	33	(3)
2001–2002	Operário dos Açores	13	(0)
2002	Canelas Gaia	14	(3)
2002–2003	G.D.R.C. Os Sandinenses		
2003–2004	Seixal		

International career
1997–1998	Angola	6	(0)
- * Club domestic league appearances and goals

Helmer da Piedade Rosa (born 3 July 1971), commonly known as Zito, is an Angolan former professional footballer who played as a left winger. He played in six matches for the Angola national team in 1997 and 1998. He was also named in Angola's squad for the 1998 African Cup of Nations tournament.
