= Juan Cachaizamba =

Angolan footballer (born 1973)

Personal information
- Full name: Juan Manuel Pascal Cachaizamba
- Date of birth: 14 August 1973 (age 53)
- Position: Midfielder

International career
Years	Team	Apps	(Gls)
1997–1999	Angola	10	(0)

Juan Manuel Pascal Cachaizamba (born 14 August 1973) is an Angolan footballer. He played in ten matches for the Angola national football team from 1997 to 1999. He was also named in Angola's squad for the 1998 African Cup of Nations tournament.
