= Badibanga Ilunga =

Congolese footballer

Personal information
- Date of birth: 16 June 1972 (age 54)

International career
Years	Team	Apps	(Gls)
1997–1998	DR Congo	2	(0)
Medal record
Representing DR Congo
Men's football
Africa Cup of Nations
Third place	1998 Burkina Faso

Badibanga Ilunga (born 16 June 1972) is a Congolese footballer. He played in two matches for the DR Congo national football team in 1997 and 1998. He was also named in the DR Congo's squad for the 1998 African Cup of Nations tournament.

== Honours ==
DR Congo

- African Cup of Nations: 3rd place, 1998
