= Fillemon Kanalelo =

Namibian footballer

Personal information
- Full name: Ronnie Fillemon Kanalelo
- Date of birth: 23 May 1971 (age 55)
- Place of birth: Okongo, South-West Africa
- Position: Goalkeeper

Youth career
- Super Stars
- 1986-: Blue Waters

Senior career*
Years	Team	Apps	(Gls)
- Eleven Arrows
1991–1992	Blue Waters	194	(0)
1993–1996	Black Africa		
1997–2005	Mamelodi Sundowns	64	(0)

International career
	Namibia U23	3	(0)
1992–1999	Namibia	53	(0)

Managerial career
- 2007: Eleven Arrows (tech.dir.)
- 2009-2010: Eleven Arrows
- 2010: Tura Magic
- 2010-2011: Tigers
- 2011-2013: Maritzburg United (gk.coach)
- 2013-2014: Namibia (asst.)
- 2014: Bloemfontein Celtic (gk.coach)
- 2015: Black Africa
- 2015: Namibia
- 2016-2018: UNAM
- 2018: Namibia
- 2022-2023: UNAM
- 2023-2025: African Stars F.C.
- 2025: Bucks Buccaneers
Medal record
Men's football
Representing Namibia
COSAFA Cup
Runner-up	1997 Southern Africa
Runner-up	1999 Southern Africa
- * Club domestic league appearances and goals

Ronnie Fillemon Kanalelo (born 23 May 1971) is a retired Namibian footballer. He took temporary charge of the Namibia national football team in June 2015 following the resignation of Ricardo Mannetti.

== Club career ==
Nicknamed 'Magnet', Kanalelo was born in Okongo, in the Ohangwena Region near the Angolan border, but moved to Walvis Bay aged 2. There, he began playing football alongside future national teammate Eliphas Shivute at the Kuisebmond township side Super Stars. He played senior football from 1991 to 1997 with Eleven Arrows, Blue Waters and Black Africa of the Namibia Premier League and from 1997 to 2005 with Mamelodi Sundowns in South Africa.

== International career ==
Kanalelo played internationally with Namibia from 1992–1999. He represented his country in nine FIFA World Cup qualification matches and played all three matches at the 1998 African Cup of Nations. He made his debut for the Brave Warriors in an October 1992 World Cup qualification match against Madagascar and totalled 53 games for them. His international career was cut short when he took up South African citizenship in 2000, as Namibian law does not allow dual nationality, but he reversed the decision in 2001.

== Managerial career ==
On 17 August 2010, Kanalelo became the new head coach of Tura Magic Football Club which plays in the Southern Stream First Division. In November 2010 he became manager of the United Africa Tigers.

In July 2011, he returned to South Africa to serve as goalkeeper coach at Maritzburg United.

In January 2015, Kanalelo was reported to be the new Black Africa manager, succeeding Brian Isaacs, after being dismissed as goalkeeper coach at South African side Bloemfontein Celtic.

On 18 June 2015, it was announced that he would lead the Namibian national team on a temporary basis.

In October 2022, Kanalelo took charge of UNAM, with former international teammate Robert Nauseb working as his assistant. He had worked at UNAM before, from 2016 until late 2018.

== Honours ==
Namibia

- COSAFA Cup: Runner-up, 1997, 1999
