= Phillip Gariseb =

Namibian footballer

Personal information
- Date of birth: 6 September 1973 (age 53)
- Place of birth: Otjiwarongo, South West Africa
- Position: Defender

Senior career*
Years	Team	Apps	(Gls)
1990	Black Marroko		
1991	African Stars		
1994	United Africa Tigers		
1997-1998	FC Penzberg		

International career
1995–1999	Namibia	18	(0)
Medal record
Men's football
Representing Namibia
COSAFA Cup
Runner-up	1999 Southern Africa
- * Club domestic league appearances and goals

Phillip Gariseb (born 6 September 1973) is a Namibian footballer.

== Club career ==
Gariseb had a year spell in German football with FC Penzberg, playing alongside fellow international players Frans Ananias and Erastus Gariseb.

== International career ==
He played in 18 matches for the Namibia national football team from 1995 to 1999. He was also named in Namibia's squad for the 1998 African Cup of Nations tournament.

== Honours ==
Namibia

- COSAFA Cup: Runner-up, 1999
