= Salvador Macamo =

Mozambican footballer

Personal information
- Date of birth: 27 September 1976 (age 50)

International career
Years	Team	Apps	(Gls)
1997–2002	Mozambique	10	(0)

Salvador Macamo (born 27 September 1976) is a Mozambican footballer. He played in ten matches for the Mozambique national football team from 1997 to 2002. He was also named in Mozambique's squad for the 1998 African Cup of Nations tournament.
