= Abdallah Bah =

Guinean footballer

Personal information
- Date of birth: 30 November 1975 (age 50)
- Place of birth: Dakar, Senegal
- Height: 1.83 m (6 ft 0 in)
- Position: Goalkeeper

Youth career
- Nice

Senior career*
Years	Team	Apps	(Gls)
1995–1996	Nice	3	(0)
1997–1998	L'Ile-Rousse		
1998	CP Mérida	1	(0)
1999	Plasencia	1	(0)
1999–2000	Leyton Orient	0	(0)
2000	DC United	0	(0)
2001–2003	Nice B	14	(0)
2005–2006	US Raon	3	(0)

International career
1998–2004	Guinea		
- * Club domestic league appearances and goals

Abdallah Bah (born 30 November 1975) is a retired Guinean footballer. He played as a goalkeeper.

During his professional career, Bah played in France, Spain, England and the United States. Internationally, he was part of the Guinean 2004 African Cup of Nations team, who finished second in their group in the first round of competition, before losing in the quarterfinals to Mali.
