= Amavi Agbobli-Atayi =

Togolese footballer

Personal information
- Date of birth: 25 December 1975 (age 50)
- Position: Defender

Senior career*
Years	Team	Apps	(Gls)
- OC Agaza

International career^{‡}
1993–2001	Togo	37	(0)
- * Club domestic league appearances and goals as of 1 August 2020 ‡ National team caps and goals as of 1 August 2020

Amavi Agbobli-Atayi (born 25 December 1975) is a retired Togolese football defender. He was a squad member for the 1998 African Cup of Nations, where the team did not advance beyond the group stage.
