= Peter Chitila =

Zambian footballer (born 1971)

Personal information
- Date of birth: 8 September 1971 (age 55)
- Position: Defender

International career
| Years | Team | Apps | (Gls) |
| 1997–2000 | Zambia | 10 | (0) |

Peter Chitila (born 8 September 1971) is a Zambian footballer. He played in ten matches for the Zambia national football team from 1997 to 2000. He was also named in Zambia's squad for the 1998 African Cup of Nations tournament.
