= Constance Mantey =

Ghanaian footballer

Personal information
- Date of birth: 31 August 1976 (age 50)
- Position: Goalkeeper

Senior career*
Years	Team	Apps	(Gls)
1997–2000	Asante Kotoko		
2001	Goldfields Obuasi		

International career
2000	Ghana	2	(0)
- * Club domestic league appearances and goals

Constance Mantey (born 31 August 1976) is a Ghanaian former international footballer who played as a goalkeeper.

== Career ==
Mantey has played club football for Asante Kotoko and Goldfields Obuasi.

He also played at international level for Ghana, earning two caps in 2000, and was a squad member at the African Cup of Nations in 1998 and 2000.
