= Mário Artur =

Portuguese-born Mozambican footballer and manager

Personal information
- Full name: Mário Artur Borges Oliveira
- Date of birth: 14 May 1969 (age 57)
- Place of birth: Funchal, Portugal
- Height: 1.79 m (5 ft 10 in)
- Positions: Defensive midfielder; defender

Team information
- Current team: Académica (assistant manager)

Youth career
- 1982–1983: Santa Iria
- 1983–1987: Vialonga

Senior career*
Years	Team	Apps	(Gls)
1987–1989	Vialonga		
1989–1991	Campomaiorense	26	(2)
1991–1999	União Leiria	156	(1)
1999–2001	Moreirense	46	(1)
2001–2003	Olhanense	64	(0)
2003–2004	Beira-Mar Monte Gordo	–	(–)

International career
1995–1998	Mozambique	17	(1)

Managerial career
- 2004–2006: Olhanense (assistant)
- 2006–2007: Beira-Mar Monte Gordo (assistant)
- 2007: União Leiria (assistant)
- 2007–2009: União Leiria U19
- 2010–2011: Alqueidão Serra
- 2013–2014: Mata Mourisquense
- 2014–: Académica (assistant)
- * Club domestic league appearances and goals

Mário Artur Borges Oliveira (born 14 May 1969), simply known as Mário Artur, is a former Portuguese born Mozambican footballer and current assistant manager of Académica de Coimbra.

== International career ==
Artur played 17 times for the Mozambican national team, scoring his only goal on 18 August 1998 against Portugal, in a friendly.

=== International goals ===
#	Date	Venue	Opponent	Result	Competition
1	18 August 1998	Ponta Delgada, Estádio de São Miguel, Portugal	Portugal	1–2	Friendly
