= Mutamba Makenga =

Congolese footballer (born 1975)

Personal information
- Date of birth: 17 November 1975 (age 50)
- Position: Defender

International career
Years	Team	Apps	(Gls)
1997–1999	DR Congo	11	(0)
Medal record
Representing DR Congo
Men's football
Africa Cup of Nations
Third place	1998 Burkina Faso

Mutamba Makenga (born 17 November 1975) is a Congolese footballer who played as a defender. He played in eleven matches for the DR Congo national team from 1997 to 1999. He was also named in the DR Congo's squad for the 1998 African Cup of Nations tournament.

== Honours ==
DR Congo

- African Cup of Nations: 3rd place, 1998
