= Ratei Takpara =

Togolese footballer

Personal information
- Date of birth: 12 June 1974 (age 52)
- Position: Defender

International career
Years	Team	Apps	(Gls)
1990–1998	Togo	34	(1)

Ratei Takpara (born 12 June 1974) is a Togolese former footballer who played as a defender. He made 18 appearances for the Togo national team from 1992 to 1998. He was also named in Togo's squad for the 1998 African Cup of Nations tournament.
