= Keffing Dioubaté =

Guinean footballer

Personal information
- Date of birth: 28 November 1975 (age 50)
- Place of birth: Kankan, Guinea
- Position: Midfielder

International career
Years	Team	Apps	(Gls)
1998	Guinea	5	(1)

Keffing Dioubaté (born 28 November 1975) is a Guinean footballer. He played in five matches for the Guinea national football team in 1998. He was also named in Guinea's squad for the 1998 African Cup of Nations tournament.
