= Ndaba =

Ndaba is a given name. It may refer to:

- Ndaba Dube (born 1959), Zimbabawean boxer
- Ndaba kaMageba, King of the Zulu from 1745 to 1763
- Ndaba Mandela (born 1982), author, entrepreneur, political consultant. Grandson of Nelson Mandela
- Ndaba Mhlongo (1933-1989), South African actor, comedian, director, choreographer

== See also ==
- Ndabazinhle Mdhlongwa (born 1973), Zimbabwean triple jumper
- Ndama, people with the given name or surname
