= Maybin Chisanga =

Zambian footballer (born 1971)

Personal information
- Date of birth: 4 March 1971 (age 55)

International career
Years	Team	Apps	(Gls)
1998–1999	Zambia	6	(0)

Maybin Chisanga (born 4 March 1971) is a Zambian footballer. He played in six matches for the Zambia national football team in 1998 and 1999. He was also named in Zambia's squad for the 1998 African Cup of Nations tournament.
