= Mohamed Abdelnasser =

Egyptian footballer (born 2006)

Personal information
- Date of birth: 9 September 2006 (age 20)
- Place of birth: Cairo, Egypt
- Position: Midfielder

Team information
- Current team: Al Mokawloon Al Arab
- Number: 74

Youth career
- 2015–2025: Al Mokawloon Al Arab

Senior career*
Years	Team	Apps	(Gls)
2024–	Al Mokawloon Al Arab	33	(3)

International career^{‡}
2022–2024	Egypt U17	11	(0)
2025	Egypt U20	1	(0)
- * Club domestic league appearances and goals as of 23:39, 28 October 2026 (UTC) ‡ National team caps and goals as of 28 October 2026 (UTC)

Mohamed Abdelnasser (Arabic: محمد عبدالناصر; born 9 September 2006) is an Egyptian professional footballer who plays as a midfielder for Egyptian Premier League club Al Mokawloon Al Arab.
