= Alfonso Cossa =

Italian chemist (1833–1902)

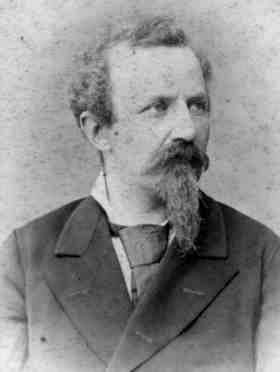

Alfonso Cossa (Milan 3 November 1833 - Turin 23 October 1902) was an Italian chemist.

== Biography ==
Cossa was born to Giuseppe, who was a notable paleographer and a librarian at Biblioteca di Brera and to Giustiniana Magnocavallo. He attended High School in Milan and, in 1852, he enrolled at Almo Collegio Borromeo in Pavia, where he graduated in Medicine in 1858 with a dissertation on the history of electrochemistry. Soon after, he became an assistant professor, and later on a professor, in chemistry at the University of Pavia. In 1866, called by the Royal Commissioner in Udine Quintino Sella, he founded the Regio Istituto tecnico of Udine, of which he was a teacher and headmaster up to 1872. In the same year, he founded the Scuola superiore di Agricoltura di Portici, and was its first director from October 1872 to October 1873. He moved to Turin where he directed the Agricultural Station from 1873 to 1882 and taught agricultural chemistry at the Museo industriale. In 1882, following Ascanio Sobrero, he was appointed professor of docimastic chemistry at Scuola d'applicazione degli ingegneri of Torino, which also managed for fifteen years (1887-1902). He was a member of several academies, both national and international, such as the Accademia dei Lincei, the Istituto Lombardo, the Reale Accademia delle Scienze of Torino, the Prussian Academy of Sciences in Berlin.

After graduating in Medicine, he got interested in chemistry, especially in its role in agriculture, following the studies of Justus von Liebig, of whom he translated some works, and this helped spreading the knowledge of the German chemist in Italy. In addition to vegetable physiology and agricultural chemistry, he was interested in pedology, mineralogy and petrography. Also, the introduction of the use of inorganic fertilizers in agriculture, mineral chemistry and inorganic chemistry were among his main interests.

== Main works ==
- Ricerche di Chimica Mineralogica. Udine: Tipografia di Giuseppe Seitz. 1868.
- Notizie sulle stazioni agrarie sperimentali della Germania. Udine: Tipografia di Giuseppe Seitz. 1870.
- Sulla determinazione delle formole mineralogiche di alcuni carbonati romboedrici misti. Napoli: (Publisher not given). 1869.
- Ricerche chimiche e microscopiche su roccie e minerali d'Italia (1870-1880). Torino: Vincenzo Bona. 1881.

== Bibliography ==
- Marchese, Gian Piero (1984). "Alfonso Cossa". Dizionario Biografico degli Italiani. Treccani.
- MUSEO VIRTUALE - Gli ingegneri - Alfonso Cossa, on areeweb.polito.it. URL checked on 1 April 2020
- George B. Kauffman e Ester Molayem, Alfonso Cossa. The Man and his Platinum Salts, in Johnson Matthey Technology Review. URL checked on 1 April 2020
- Vincenzo Riganti, Alfonso Cossa (1833-1902) (PDF), on fondazionemicheletti.eu. URL checked on 1 April 2020
- Alfonso Cossa, on corradosegre.unito.it. URL checked on 1 April 2020
