= Julião da Kutonda =

Angolan footballer (1965–2004)

Personal information
- Date of birth: 5 April 1965
- Place of birth: Luanda
- Date of death: 19 April 2004 (aged 39)

Senior career*
Years	Team	Apps	(Gls)
- 1º de Agosto

International career
1997–2001	Angola	37	(0)
- * Club domestic league appearances and goals

Julião da Kutonda (5 April 1965 – 19 April 2004) was an Angolan footballer who played as a defender. He made 35 appearances for the Angola national team from 1997 to 2001. He was also named in Angola's squad for the 1998 African Cup of Nations tournament.

== Death ==
Julião da Kutonda died on 19 April 2004 in a car crash that took place in Paris.
