= Abdoulaye Loukoumanou =

Togolese footballer

Personal information
- Date of birth: 31 December 1973 (age 52)
- Height: 1.78 m (5 ft 10 in)
- Position: Midfielder

Senior career*
Years	Team	Apps	(Gls)
1994–1996	CS Château-Thierry		
1996–1997	Paris FC		
1997–1998	FC Istres		
1998–1999	Paris FC		
1999–2004	AS Angoulême		

International career^{‡}
1996–1998	Togo	10	(0)
- * Club domestic league appearances and goals as of 1 August 2020 ‡ National team caps and goals as of 1 August 2020

Abdoulaye Loukoumanou (born 31 December 1973) is a retired Togolese football midfielder who played for the Togo national football team. He was a squad member for the 1998 African Cup of Nations.
