= Salem Harchèche =

Algerian footballer (born 1972)

Personal information
- Full name: Salem Harchèche
- Date of birth: 24 July 1972 (age 54)
- Place of birth: Marseille, France
- Height: 1.72 m (5 ft 7 1/2 in)
- Position: Defender

Senior career*
Years	Team	Apps	(Gls)
1991–1996	Saint-Étienne	73	(0)
1996–1998	Martigues	75	(6)
1998–2000	Caen	16	(0)
2001–2002	CR Belouizdad	2	(0)

International career
1997–2001	Algeria	13	(0)
- * Club domestic league appearances and goals

Salem Harchèche (born July 24, 1972) is a retired Algerian international footballer who played as a defender.

Harcheche spent most of his career in France and played for Saint-Étienne where he played in 73 Ligue 1 matches. He also played for Martigues and Caen in Ligue 2. (Note: Salem Harchèche – French league stats at LFP – also available in French (archived))

Harcheche made several appearances for the Algeria national football team, including three matches at the 1998 African Nations Cup finals.
