= Botomotoito Skito Litimba =

Democratic Republic of the Congo footballer

Skito Litimba
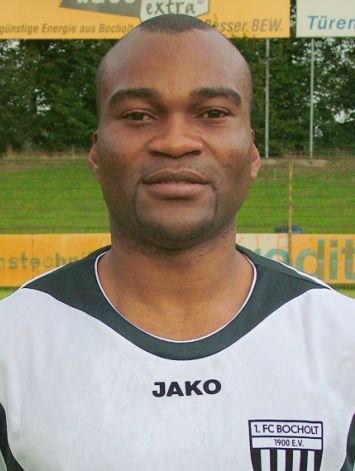
- Litimba in the 2006–07 season

Personal information
- Full name: Botomotoito Skito Litimba
- Date of birth: 7 July 1977 (age 49)
- Place of birth: Kinshasa, Zaire
- Height: 1.74 m (5 ft 9 in)
- Position: Forward

Senior career*
Years	Team	Apps	(Gls)
–1998	AS Vita Club		
1998–2000	LR Ahlen	2	(0)
2000–2001	SC Paderborn	38	(34)
2002–2003	LR Ahlen		
2003–2007	1. FC Bocholt	88	(21)
2007–2009	SV Straelen	30	(2)
Medal record
Representing DR Congo
Men's football
Africa Cup of Nations
Third place	1998 Burkina Faso
- * Club domestic league appearances and goals

Botomotoito Skito Litimba (born 7 July 1977) is a Congolese former professional footballer who played as a forward for AS Vita Club, winning the Linafoot championship in 1997. In Germany, he played for LR Ahlen, SC Paderborn 07, 1. FC Bocholt and SV Straelen.

He was part of the Congolese 1998 African Nations Cup team, who finished in third place.

== Honours ==
DR Congo

- African Cup of Nations: 3rd place, 1998
