= Blaise Kouassi (footballer, born 1975) =

Ivorian former professional footballer (born 1975)

Personal information
- Full name: Koffi Blaise Kouassi
- Date of birth: 2 February 1975 (age 51)
- Place of birth: Abidjan, Ivory Coast
- Height: 1.82 m (6 ft 0 in)
- Position: Defender

Senior career*
Years	Team	Apps	(Gls)
1998–2000	ASEC Mimosas		
2000–2005	Guingamp	117	(1)
2005–2006	Troyes	45	(0)
2006–2007	Al-Rayyan	5	(0)
2007–2009	Angers	19	(0)

International career
1997–2006	Ivory Coast	37	(0)

Managerial career
- 2010–: Ivory Coast (assistant manager)
- * Club domestic league appearances and goals

Koffi Blaise Kouassi (born 2 February 1975) is an Ivorian former professional footballer, who played as a defender. He works as assistant manager of the Ivory Coast national football team.

== Club career ==
Kouassi was born in Abidjan and began his playing career with Ivorian club ASEC Mimosas. After playing for ASEC Mimosas from 1998 to 2000, he moved to France and joined Guingamp.

He played for Guingamp from the 2000–01 season through the 2004–05 season, competing in both Ligue 1 and Ligue 2. In the 2001–02 season, he made 22 league appearances and scored one goal, followed by 21 appearances in the 2002–03 season and 35 in the 2003–04 season. Guingamp finished 18th in the 2003–04 season and were relegated to Ligue 2, where Kouassi made 33 appearances the following season.

In 2005, he joined Troyes, where he played in Ligue 1. He made 26 league appearances in the 2005–06 season and 19 in the 2006–07 season. During his two seasons at Troyes, he made 45 league appearances, but the club finished 18th in the 2006–07 season and were relegated.

In 2007, he moved to Qatar to join Al-Rayyan, continuing his playing career. He later returned to France and joined Angers, where he ended his professional playing career at the conclusion of the 2008–09 season.

== International career ==
Kouassi represented the Ivory Coast national team from 1997 to 2006, making 37 appearances without scoring a goal.

He participated in the 2002 African Cup of Nations, appearing in the group-stage matches. Ivory Coast were eliminated in the group stage and failed to advance to the knockout rounds.

At the 2006 Africa Cup of Nations, Kouassi was a member of the Ivory Coast national team. Ivory Coast defeated the Cameroon on penalties in the quarter-finals to advance to the semi-finals. In the final, they drew 0–0 with the Egypt before losing on penalties, finishing as runners-up.

In the same year, he also participated in the 2006 FIFA World Cup, held in Germany. He did not feature in the group-stage matches against the Argentina or the Netherlands. However, he started and played the full 90 minutes in Ivory Coast's final group-stage match against the Serbia and Montenegro on 21 June. Ivory Coast won the match 3–2 but were eliminated in the group stage after losing their first two matches.

== Coaching career ==
On 28 May 2010, Kouassi was appointed as an assistant coach of the Ivory Coast national team. Ahead of the 2010 FIFA World Cup, the Ivorian Football Federation added Kouassi and former international Cyril Domoraud to the national team's support staff. The two were responsible for facilitating communication between the players and the team's management.

In March 2013, reports indicated that Kouassi had been removed from the national team's technical staff, along with Domoraud and Bonaventure Kalou. However, other reports stated that the three would retain their roles within the federation while stepping back from the coaching staff.

== Personal life ==
He holds both Ivorian and French nationalities. He acquired French nationality by naturalization on 1 December 2005.

== Honors ==
Ivory Coast

- Africa Cup of Nations runner-up: 2006
