= Fernando Morais (footballer) =

Angolan footballer

Personal information
- Date of birth: 27 January 1966 (age 60)

International career
Years	Team	Apps	(Gls)
1998–1999	Angola	10	(0)

Fernando Morais (born 27 January 1966) is an Angolan footballer. He played in ten matches for the Angola national football team in 1998 and 1999. He was also named in Angola's squad for the 1998 African Cup of Nations tournament.
