= Sylvester Musonda =

Zambian footballer (born 1973)

Personal information
- Date of birth: 20 December 1973 (age 52)
- Position: Forward

Senior career*
Years	Team	Apps	(Gls)
1998	RoPS		

International career
1997	Zambia	1	(2)
- * Club domestic league appearances and goals

Sylvester Musonda (born 20 December 1973) is a Zambian former professional footballer who played as a forward. He made one appearance, scoring two goals, for the Zambia national team in 1997. He was also named in Zambia's squad for the 1998 African Cup of Nations tournament.
