= Izak Akakpo =

Togolese footballer (born 2004)

Personal information
- Date of birth: 28 February 2004 (age 22)
- Place of birth: Châteauroux, France
- Height: 1.88 m (6 ft 2 in)
- Position: Centre-back

Team information
- Current team: Lorient II
- Number: 6

Youth career
- 2009–2012: JS Nieuil l'Espoir
- 2012–2014: AS Lavernose Lherm Mauzac
- 2014–2019: Toulouse
- 2019–2021: Muret
- 2021–2022: Colomiers

Senior career*
| Years | Team | Apps | (Gls) |
| 2022–2025 | Dijon II | 38 | (2) |
| 2024–2025 | Dijon | 6 | (0) |
| 2025– | Lorient II | 15 | (0) |

International career^{‡}
| 2026– | Togo | 1 | (0) |
- * Club domestic league appearances and goals as of 13:52, 15 April 2026 (UTC) ‡ National team caps and goals as of 13:52, 15 April 2026 (UTC)

Izak Akakpo (born 28 February 2004) is a professional footballer who plays as a centre-back for Championnat National 1 club Lorient II. Born in France, he plays for the Togo national team.

== Club career ==
Akakpo is a product of the youth academies of the French clubs JS Nieuil l'Espoir, AS Lavernose Lherm Mauzac, Toulouse, Muret and Colomiers. He joined Dijon on 8 June 2022 where he was assigned to their reserves. On 16 April 2024, he signed a trainee contract with Dijon, and started making appearances with their senior team in the Championnat National. On 19 July 2025, he signed a professional contract with Lorient on a 1 year contract with option to extend for 2 more.

== International career ==
Born in France, Akakpo is of Togolese descent. He was called up to the Togo national team for a set of friendlies in March 2026.
