= Maher Zdiri =

Tunisian footballer

Personal information
- Date of birth: 5 September 1970 (age 56)
- Place of birth: Tunis, Tunisia
- Position: Midfielder

Senior career*
Years	Team	Apps	(Gls)
- Olympique Béja
- Club Africain
- Olympique Béja

International career
1993–1998	Tunisia	10	(0)

Managerial career
- 2013: Olympique Béja
- 2014–2015: Club Africain (assistant)
- 2016–2017: That Ras Club
- 2017–2018: Salam Zgharta
- 2018–2020: Jendouba Sport
- * Club domestic league appearances and goals

Maher Zdiri (born 5 September 1970) is a Tunisian football manager and former player. A midfielder, he made ten appearances for the Tunisia national team from 1993 to 1998. He was also named in Tunisia's squad for the 1998 African Cup of Nations tournament.
