= Danzyl Bruwer =

Namibian footballer

Personal information
- Date of birth: 5 November 1976 (age 49)
- Place of birth: Khomasdal, South West Africa
- Height: 1.87 m (6 ft 2 in)
- Position: Goalkeeper

Senior career*
Years	Team	Apps	(Gls)
1995-1998	Civics		
1999-2000	Young Ones	57	(0)
2001-2002	Avendale Athletico	28	(0)
2002-2003	African Wanderers		
2003-2005	Civics		
2006	Wits University		
2006-2008	Bay United		
2008	Ajax Cape Town		

International career
1997-2002	Namibia	28	(0)
- * Club domestic league appearances and goals

Danzyl Bruwer (born 5 November 1976) is a Namibian retired footballer formerly with Ajax Cape Town FC in the Premier Soccer League of South Africa.

== Club career ==
Born in Khomasdal, Windhoek, Bruwer started playing football for local side Young Ones, quickly replacing the regular goalkeeper Reus Nortje between the sticks. He moved abroad to play for South African second-tier outfit Avendale Athletico, then joined fellow Namibian internationals Richard Gariseb and Paulus Shipanga at top tier Wits University. He later moved to Ajax Cape Town.

=== Doping charges ===
In December 2008, Bruwer tested positive for use of an illegal substance. Bruwer did not return to the club to defend himself of the charge, and instead remained in Namibia. Ajax Cape Town then terminated his contract, which had two years remaining on it at the time.

== International career ==
A Namibia international, Bruwer was included in the squad in the 1998 African Cup of Nations. He made his debut for the Brave Warriors in a November 1997 friendly match against Lesotho and totalled 28 games for them.

== Personal life ==
After retiring as a player, Bruwer worked as a radio presenter and is the owner of New Season Investment. He also worked for a company that specializes in installing vehicle tracking devices.
