= Maurice Camara =

Guinean footballer (born 1977)

Personal information
- Date of birth: 17 September 1977 (age 49)
- Place of birth: Conakry, Guinea
- Position: Defender

International career
Years	Team	Apps	(Gls)
1996–2000	Guinea	10	(0)

Maurice Camara (born 17 September 1977) is a Guinean former professional footballer. He played in ten matches for the Guinea national team from 1996 to 2000. He was also named in Guinea's squad for the 1998 African Cup of Nations tournament.
