= Kodjo Balogou =

Togolese footballer

Personal information
- Date of birth: 17 November 1976 (age 49)
- Place of birth: Atakpamé, Togo
- Position: Defender

International career
Years	Team	Apps	(Gls)
1997	Togo	6	(0)

Kodjo Balogou (born 17 November 1976) is a Togolese footballer. He played in six matches for the Togo national football team in 1997. He was also named in Togo's squad for the 1998 African Cup of Nations tournament.
