= Driss El-Asmar =

Moroccan footballer (born 1975)

Personal information
- Full name: Driss Ahmed El-Asmar
- Date of birth: 4 December 1975 (age 50)
- Place of birth: Morocco
- Position: Goalkeeper

Senior career*
Years	Team	Apps	(Gls)
1995–1998	Difaa El Jadida		
1998–2000	FAR Rabat		
2000–2001	Difaa El Jadida		
2001	Degerfors IF	15	(0)
2001–2003	Malmö FF	0	(0)
2003	→ Enköpings SK (loan)	4	(0)
2003–2006	Raja Casablanca		
2006	Kvarnsvedens IK		
2006–2007	Ethnikos Asteras	28	(0)

International career
1998–2003	Morocco	3	(0)
- * Club domestic league appearances and goals

Driss Ahmed El-Asmar (born 4 December 1975) is a Moroccan former professional football goalkeeper who played for clubs in Morocco, Sweden and Greece. A full international between 1998 and 2003, he won three caps for Morocco and represented his country at the 1998 African Cup of Nations.

== Club career ==
El-Asmar began playing club football with local side Difaa El Jadida in 1995. He moved to FAR Rabat for three seasons before returning to Difaa El Jadida for one more season before moving to play abroad.

El-Asmar initially went to Sweden to play for second division side Degerfors IF. After a successful season, he signed a three-year contract with Malmö FF in September 2001.

After his stint in Sweden, El-Asmar returned to Morocco to play for Raja Casablanca and would win the 2003–04 Botola title with the club. At age 30, he moved abroad again, signing with Ethnikos Asteras F.C. in the Greek second division in June 2006.

== International career ==
El-Asmar made three appearances for the Morocco national football team and was selected as a reserve goalkeeper for the 1998 African Cup of Nations finals. He had a good performance in a friendly during the 2004 Africa Cup of Nations qualifying build-up in April 2003.
