= Helder Cossa =

Mozambican footballer

Personal information
- Date of birth: 26 September 1969 (age 57)
- Position: Goalkeeper

International career
Years	Team	Apps	(Gls)
1998–2002	Mozambique	2	(0)

Helder Cossa (born 26 September 1969) is a Mozambican footballer. He played in two matches for the Mozambique national football team from 1998 to 2002. He was also named in Mozambique's squad for the 1998 African Cup of Nations tournament.
