= Ndama Bapupa =

Congolese footballer

Personal information
- Full name: Didier Bapupa N'dama
- Date of birth: 30 June 1972 (age 54)
- Place of birth: Kinshasa, Zaire
- Height: 1.81 m (5 ft 11 1/2 in)
- Position: Defender

Senior career*
Years	Team	Apps	(Gls)
–1993	DC Motema Pembe		
1993–2001	Oostende	57+ (Note: Only appearances in the Belgian First Division A are shown.)	(0+)
2001–2002	Cercle Brugge	6	(0)
2003-2004	Oostduinkerke		

International career^{‡}
1992–1998	DR Congo (Note: DR Congo was known as Zaire until 1997.)	13	(1)
Medal record
Representing DR Congo
Men's football
Africa Cup of Nations
Third place	1998 Burkina Faso
- * Club domestic league appearances and goals as of 22:00, 15 July 2020 (UTC) ‡ National team caps and goals as of 22:00, 15 July 2020 (UTC)

Didier Bapupa N'dama (born 30 June 1972) is a retired footballer who played for DR Congo at the 1998 Africa Cup of Nations.

== Honours ==
DR Congo

- African Cup of Nations: 3rd place, 1998
