= Adantor Akakpo =

Togolese footballer

Personal information
- Date of birth: 21 September 1965 (age 61)
- Place of birth: Adakpamé, Togo
- Position: Goalkeeper

International career
Years	Team	Apps	(Gls)
1992–1997	Togo	2	(0)

Adantor Akakpo (born 21 September 1965) is a Togolese footballer. He played in two matches for the Togo national football team from 1992 to 1997. He was named in Togo's squad for the 1998 African Cup of Nations.
