= 1996 African Cup Winners' Cup =

Tournament details
- Dates: February - 6 December 1996
- Teams: 37 (from 1 confederation)

Final positions
- Champions: (Egypt) El Mokawloon El Arab (3rd title)
- Runners-up: (Zaire) AC Sodigraf

Tournament statistics
- Matches played: 59
- Goals scored: 159 (2.69 per match)

The 1996 African Cup Winners' Cup football club tournament was won by El Mokawloon El Arab in two-legged final victory against AC Sodigraf. This was the twenty-third season that the tournament took place for the winners of each African country's domestic cup. Thirty-seven sides entered the competition. Teams from Mauritania were disqualified because their federation was in debt to CAF. Great Olympics, Posta and Zasmure all withdrew before the 1st leg of the first round while Chapungu withdrew after the 1st leg. Olympique Béja withdrew before 1st leg of the second round and finally, Pretoria City withdrew before the 1st leg of the quarterfinals.

== Preliminary round ==
Team 1	Agg.	Team 2	1st leg	2nd leg
Mogas 90 FC (Benin)	dq^{1}	(Mauritania) ASC Air Mauritanie	—	—
Rayon Sports (Rwanda)	4–4 (5–4 p)	(Ethiopia) Ethiopian IC	3–1	1–3
Red Star (Seychelles)	1–2	(Réunion) SS Saint-Louisienne	0–0	1–2
Notwane FC (Botswana)	4–0	(Eswatini) Mhlambanyatsi Rovers	2–0	2–0
MP Tigers (Namibia)	3–3 (4–1 p)	(Lesotho) Real Rovers	1–2	2–1

Notes
^{1} teams from Mauritania were disqualified because their federation was in debt to CAF.

== First round ==
Team 1	Agg.	Team 2	1st leg	2nd leg
ASKO Kara (Togo)	3–5	(Ivory Coast) Stade d'Abidjan	2–1	1–4
FUS Rabat (Morocco)	5–1	(Benin) Mogas 90 FC	5–0	0–1
Canon Yaoundé (Cameroon)	2–0	(Chad) AS CotonTchad	1–0	1–0
Olympique Béja (Tunisia)	8–1	(Burkina Faso) ASF Bobo Dioulasso	6–0	2–1
AS Douanes (Senegal)	w/o	(Ghana) Great Olympics	—	—
CR Belouizdad (Algeria)	5–4	(Guinea) Horoya AC	5–2	0–2
ASA (Angola)	3–5	(Gabon) Mbilinga FC	1–1	2–4
Étoile du Congo (Republic of the Congo)	4–4 (a)	(Nigeria) Katsina United	2–3	2–1^{1}
Chapungu United (Zimbabwe)	w/o	(Tanzania) Simba SC	1–0	—
El Mokawloon (Egypt)	2–1	(Rwanda) Rayon Sports	2–1	0–0
Pretoria City FC (South Africa)	8–1	(Réunion) SS Saint-Louisienne	5–0	3–1
Fire Brigade SC (Mauritius)	1–2	(Botswana) Notwane FC	0–1	1–1
Vital'O FC (Burundi)	2–4	(Mozambique) Costa do Sol	0–1	2–3
Rivatex FC (Kenya)	2–3	(Sudan) Al-Mourada SC	1–2	1–1
AC Sodigraf (Zaire)	w/o	(Uganda) Posta FC	—	—
MP Tigers (Namibia)	w/o	(Zambia) Zamsure FC	—	—

Notes
^{1} 2nd leg originally abandoned at 1-0 to Étoile du Congo.

== Second round ==
Team 1	Agg.	Team 2	1st leg	2nd leg
Stade d'Abidjan (Ivory Coast)	1–3	(Morocco) FUS Rabat	1–1	0–2
Canon Yaoundé (Cameroon)	w/o	(Tunisia) Olympique Béja	—	—
AS Douanes (Senegal)	0–2	(Algeria) CR Belouizdad	0–0	0–2
Mbilinga FC (Gabon)	3–3 (2–3 p)	(Nigeria) Katsina United	3–0	0–3
Simba SC (Tanzania)	3–3 (a)	(Egypt) El Mokawloon	3–1	0–2
Pretoria City FC (South Africa)	5–1	(Botswana) Notwane FC	2–1	3–0
Costa do Sol (Mozambique)	7–3	(Sudan) Al-Mourada SC	3–0	4–3
AC Sodigraf (Zaire)	10–0	(Namibia) MP Tigers	7–0	3–0

== Quarter-finals ==
Team 1	Agg.	Team 2	1st leg	2nd leg
CR Belouizdad (Algeria)	w/o	(South Africa) Pretoria City FC	—	—
Canon Yaoundé (Cameroon)	2–2 (a)	(Mozambique) Costa do Sol	0–0	2–2
FUS Rabat (Morocco)	0–1	(Egypt) El Mokawloon	0–0	0–1
AC Sodigraf (Zaire)	2–0	(Nigeria) Katsina United	2–0	0–0

== Semi-finals ==
Team 1	Agg.	Team 2	1st leg	2nd leg
CR Belouizdad (Algeria)	1–2	(Zaire) AC Sodigraf	1–1	0–1
El Mokawloon (Egypt)	3–2	(Cameroon) Canon Yaoundé	2–1	1–1

== Final ==
Team 1	Agg.	Team 2	1st leg	2nd leg
AC Sodigraf (Zaire)	0–4	(Egypt) El Mokawloon	0–0	0–4

=== First leg ===
24 November 1996

AC Sodigraf (Zaire)	0 – 0	(Egypt) El Mokawloon

Stade des Martyrs, Kinshasa
Attendance: 10,000
Referee: Boucetta (Tunisia)

=== Second leg ===
6 December 1996

El Mokawloon (Egypt)	4 – 0	(Zaire) AC Sodigraf
Ashour 7', 54' (pen.); Ouda 25', 74'

Cairo International Stadium, Cairo
Attendance: 40,000
Referee: Falla N'Doye (Senegal)

== Champions ==
African Cup Winners' Cup Winners
(Egypt)
El Mokawloon El Arab
Third title

== See also ==
- 1996 African Cup of Champions Clubs
- 1997 CAF Super Cup
