= FC Penzberg =

German football club

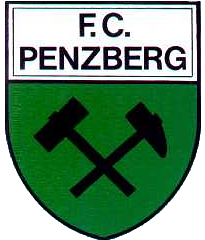
- Full name: Fussball Club 1920 Penzberg e.V.
- Founded: 14 March 1920
- Ground: FC Gelände
- Capacity: 800
- Chairman: Franz Reitmeier
- Manager: Josef Siegert
- League: Bezirksliga Oberbayern (VII)
- 2015–16: Kreisliga Zugspitze (VIII), 1st ↑
Home colours	Away colours

The FC Penzberg is a German association football club from the city of Penzberg, Bavaria.

The club briefly managed to reach the second division of German league football, spending the 1955–56 season in the 2nd Oberliga Süd.

== History ==
=== 1920 to 1945 ===
The FC Penzberg was formed on 14 March 1920 but was actually a continuation of the local gymnastics clubs football department which had existed before the First World War. The club struggled to find a suitable playing field in its early days and eventually had to do with a local swamp. This was converted to a football field through back filling with ash. The local coalmine supplied technical support for this. The new ground was opened on 30 July 1921.

The FCP had the opportunity to take part in a promotion round to the local A-Klasse in 1922 but was not strong enough to succeed. In the 1922–23 and 1923–24 seasons, the team won the local championship and earned promotion to the A-Klasse in 1924. The club found it hard to compete with the stronger clubs from Munich there and was immediately relegated.

This relegation was followed by a decline in performance and interest in the club and it took until 1927 to win another local championship and return to the A-Klasse. Initially, the team struggled again in this league but a good second half of the season saw it secure its position in it. The next season, the club was better equipped to hold the league, thanks to a merger with the football department of the sports club at Kochel. The club managed to remain in the A-Klasse until 1932, when it was relegated once more.

Mostly unaffected by the rise of the Nazis in 1933, the FCP remained a top-team in the local competition, commonly then called the Würmgau or Zugspitze regional league, after its geographic location. More titles in this league followed in 1935 and 1937. The later saw the team move up a league once more but again it could not maintain this level. Back in local play, it won its sixth title in 1939. After this, the outbreak of the Second World War made league football in the region very difficult.

=== 1945 to 1963 ===
Upon the end of the war, the club properly reformed on 17 February 1946, when a new chairman was elected. In 1949, the club celebrated another championship, winning the southern division of the Oberbayern league, and earned the right to take part in the promotion round to the Landesliga Bayern, then the second tier of the German football league system. The FCP came second, on equal points to the ASV Cham but then lost a necessary decider 0–1 aet. It did however have a second chance, playing the VfL Ingolstadt-Ringsee for one more place in the Landesliga, but lost this game, too, 0–2.

In 1953, the club got another chance to earn promotion to Bavarias highest league, now called the Amateurliga Bayern and only the third tier of the league system since 1950, when the 2nd Oberliga was introduced.

The FCP won its group of six teams and finally earned promotion but this turned out to be an unnecessary achievement as the Bavarian FA decided on 7 July 1953 to split its highest league into a northern and a southern division and all six teams from the round were admitted.

In the Amateurliga Südbayern in 1953–54, the club came seventh out of fifteen teams. The season after, the team surprised everybody and won the league by three points. After a special meeting it was decided to take part in the promotion round to the 2nd Oberliga Süd. Here, the FCP faced the SSV Ulm and FC Rastatt 04 and came out on top, earning a surprise promotion to the second division.

For the small-town club FC Penzberg, in a league with FC Bayern Munich, Hessen Kassel and Waldhof Mannheim, the season became a struggle, but also a unique experience, playing Bayern Munich at home in front of 7,000 and then in Munich in front of 20,000. The club came second-last, only the VfR Heilbronn ended up behind them and had to return to the Amateurliga.

Not discouraged, the club won the Amateurliga for a second time but lost both Bavarian championship games against 1. FC Bamberg and missed out on the promotion round, where Bamberg failed, too. The year after, 1957–58, the club was not in contention for the championship, coming only seventh. From there, the club rapidly declined, finishing fifteenth in 1959 and being relegated to the 2nd Amateurliga. In 1961, the team dropped further, back to the A-Klasse (V) but managed to break the fall and return to the 2nd Amateurliga for 1962–63.

=== 1963–present ===
The introduction of the Bundesliga was only one change of many in the German league system in 1963. In Bavaria, the 2. Amateurliga was replaced by the Landesligas and for southern Bavaria, the Landesliga Bayern-Süd was put in place. However, the FCP could not qualify for it and would from now on remain within the leagues of the Bezirk Oberbayern.

Instead, Penzberg dropped all the way to the A-Klasse, now the sixth tier but won the championship there straight away and earned promotion to the Bezirksliga Oberbayern-Süd. From 1964 to 1973, the club belonged to this league before dropping back down to the A-Klasse. This time, it could not rebound straight away but did return to the Bezirksliga eventually

The club became one of the founding members of the Bezirksoberliga Oberbayern (V) in 1988 and belonged to this league until 1992, when a thirteenth place meant relegation. The team was handed straight through the Bezirksliga in 1992–93 and had to return to the A-Klasse (now Kreisliga) once more. It was to be the club's last stint in the Bezirksliga as of 2008.

In 2004, the club even dropped down to the Kreisklasse for a season but recovered and returned to the Kreisliga. This league is the equivalent of the old A-Klasse it once started in the 1920s. The club eventually suffered another relegation, back to the Kreisklasse Zugspitze for 2011–12. From there, in 2013, it dropped to the A-Klasse after coming last in its league. In this league it took out the championship without a loss all season and was promoted back up to the Kreisklasse in 2014. a league championship the following year took the club back to the Kreisliga, followed by promotion to the Bezirksliga in 2016.

== Honours ==
The club's honours:

=== League ===
- Amateurliga Südbayern (III)
  - Champions: (2) 1955, 1957
- Southern Oberbayern championship (III)
  - Champions: 1949
- 2. Amateurliga Oberbayern B (IV)
  - Champions: 1953
- Würmgau championship
  - Champions: (6) 1923, 1924, 1927, 1935, 1937, 1939
- Kreisliga Zugspitze
  - Champions: 2016

== Recent seasons ==
The recent season-by-season performance of the club:

Season	Division	Tier	Position
2003–04	Kreisliga Zugspitze Gruppe 1	VIII	13th ↓
2004–05	Kreisklasse Zugspitze Gruppe 3	IX	2nd ↑
2005–06	Kreisliga Zugspitze Gruppe 1	VIII	7th
2006–07	Kreisliga Zugspitze Gruppe 1	VIII	9th
2007–08	Kreisliga Zugspitze Gruppe 1	VIII	6th
2008–09	Kreisliga Zugspitze Gruppe 1	IX	10th
2009–10	Kreisliga Zugspitze Gruppe 1	IX	3rd
2010–11	Kreisliga Zugspitze Gruppe 1	IX	13th ↓
2011–12	Kreisklasse Zugspitze Gruppe 2	X	11th
2012–13	Kreisklasse Zugspitze Gruppe 3	IX	14th ↓
2012–13	A-Klasse Zugspitze 5	X	1st ↑
2014–15	Kreisklasse Zugspitze Gruppe 3	IX	1st ↑
2015–16	Kreisliga Zugspitze	VIII	1st ↑
2016–17	Bezirksliga Oberbayern	VII	

- With the introduction of the Bezirksoberligas in 1988 as the new fifth tier, below the Landesligas, all leagues below dropped one tier. With the introduction of the Regionalligas in 1994 and the 3. Liga in 2008 as the new third tier, below the 2. Bundesliga, all leagues below dropped one tier. With the establishment of the Regionalliga Bayern as the new fourth tier in Bavaria in 2012 the Bayernliga was split into a northern and a southern division, the number of Landesligas expanded from three to five and the Bezirksoberligas abolished. All leagues from the Bezirksligas onwards were elevated one tier.

↑ Promoted	↓ Relegated
