= AC Sodigraf =

- Full name: Athletic Club Sodigraf
- Founded: 1989
- Ground: Stade des Martyrs, Kinshasa, DR Congo
- Capacity: 75,000
- League: EUFKIN

Athletic Club Sodigraf is a Congolese football club based in Kinshasa. Their home games are played at Stade des Martyrs.

== Achievements ==
- African Cup Winners' Cup
  - Finalist : 1996
- Coupe du Congo: 1

1995

== Performance in CAF competitions ==
- CAF Cup Winners' Cup: 1 appearance

1996 – Finalist

== Notable players ==
- Adu Bikele, former national under-17 player
- Diangi Mbala, former national under-17 player
