= 1996 African Cup of Nations qualification =

Football tournament

The Qualification for the 1996 African Cup of Nations took place in 7 groups of 6 teams each, with the top 2 teams from each group progressing to the tournament. Nigeria and South Africa qualified automatically, as champions and hosts respectively. Qualification began in September 1994 and ended in July 1995.

== Qualifying round ==
=== Group 1 ===
Lesotho withdrew after competing 6 matches (1 win, 5 losses); Their results were annulled. Swaziland withdrew without playing any matches.

Team	Pld	W	D	L	GF	GA	GD	Pts
Zaire	6	3	1	2	10	5	+5	7
Cameroon	6	3	1	2	7	7	0	7
Malawi	6	1	3	2	6	7	−1	5
Zimbabwe	6	2	1	3	8	12	−4	5
Lesotho (W)	0	0	0	0	0	0	0	0
Swaziland (W)	0	0	0	0	0	0	0	0

(W) Withdrew
4 September 1994

Zaire	1 – 1	Malawi
Essende 80'		Maduka 85'

Stade Kamanyola, Kinshasa
Referee: Pierre Alain Mounguengui (Gabon)
4 September 1994

Zimbabwe	5 – 0 Annulled	Lesotho
Nagoli 10'; Shonhai 15'; A. Ndlovu 51'; Takawira 83', 89'

National Sports Stadium, Harare

15 October 1994

Malawi	3 – 1	Zimbabwe
Banda 62'; Maduka 83'; Mpinganjira 89'		Sawu 35'

Chichiri Stadium, Blantyre
Attendance: 8,000
16 October 1994

Cameroon	1 – 0	Zaire
Mouyémé 2'

Stade de la Réunification, Douala
Attendance: 20,000

13 November 1994

Zimbabwe	2 – 1	Zaire
A.Ndlovu 52'; P.Ndlovu 89' (pen.)		Essende 66'

National Sports Stadium, Harare
Attendance: 45,000
Referee: Christian Chikuka (Zambia)
13 November 1994

Lesotho	2 – 0 Annulled	Cameroon
Lekoane 48'; Lekhotla 73'

Setsoto Stadium, Maseru
Attendance: 15,000

8 January 1995

Cameroon	0 – 0	Malawi

Stade de la Réunification, Douala
Attendance: 25,000
Referee: Jean-Fidèle Diramba (Gabon)
8 January 1995

Zaire	3 – 0 Annulled	Lesotho
Lukaku 1' (pen.); Mukanya 37'; Mbiyavanga 82'

Stade Kamanyola, Kinshasa

22 January 1995

Zimbabwe	4 – 1	Cameroon
Takawira 12', 50', 88'; Gundani 47'		Agbo 83'

National Sports Stadium, Harare
Attendance: 25,000
22 January 1995

Lesotho	0 – 2 Annulled	Malawi
		Chatunya 62'; Banda 64'

Setsoto Stadium, Maseru
Attendance: 10,000
Referee: Roger Raharison (Madagascar)

9 April 1995

Malawi	0 – 1	Zaire
		Essende 11'

Silver Stadium, Lilongwe
Attendance: 20,000
9 April 1995

Lesotho	0 – 2 Annulled	Zimbabwe
		Sawu 14'; Rinyano 16'

Setsoto Stadium, Maseru
Attendance: 4,000

23 April 1995

Zaire	2 – 1	Cameroon
N'Dinga 75'; N'Gole 82'		Mouyémé 68'

Stade Kamanyola, Kinshasa
Attendance: 45,000
Referee: Kouakou N'Dri (Ivory Coast)
23 April 1995

Zimbabwe	1 – 1	Malawi
P.Ndlovu 14' (pen.)		Banda 43'

National Sports Stadium, Harare
Attendance: 35,000

4 June 1995

Zaire	5 – 0	Zimbabwe
Kiniambi 26'; Lembi 29', 35', 55'; Lowata 77'

Stade Kamanyola, Kinshasa
Attendance: 50,000
4 June 1995

Cameroon	4 – 1 Annulled	Lesotho
Dikoumé 10', 73'; Ntoko 49'; Mouyémé 87'		Lekoane 80'

Stade Omnisports, Yaoundé
Attendance: 10,000

16 July 1995

Malawi	1 – 3	Cameroon
Maduka 55'		Mbarga 5'; Mouyémé 42', 68'

Chichiri Stadium, Blantyre
Attendance: 25,000

30 July 1995

Cameroon	1 – 0	Zimbabwe
Simo 49'

Stade Omnisports, Yaoundé
Attendance: 90,000
Referee: Okoampah (Ghana)

=== Group 2 ===
Guinea Bissau withdrew after competing 3 matches (1 draw, 2 losses); their results were annulled.

Team	Pld	W	D	L	GF	GA	GD	Pts
Tunisia	8	3	4	1	7	2	+5	10
Liberia	8	3	4	1	6	5	+1	10
Senegal	8	3	3	2	10	8	+2	9
Mauritania	8	1	4	3	3	6	−3	6
Togo	8	1	3	4	5	10	−5	5
Guinea-Bissau (W)	0	0	0	0	0	0	0	0

(W) Withdrew
3 September 1994

Senegal	0 – 0	Mauritania

Stade Léopold Sédar Senghor, Dakar
Referee: Sidi Bekaye Magassa (Mali)
4 September 1994

Liberia	1 – 0	Togo
Weah 42'

Samuel Doe Stadium, Monrovia
4 September 1994

Guinea-Bissau	1 – 3 Annulled	Tunisia
Pau 44' (pen.)		Trabelsi 5'; Baya 19'; Berkhissa 80'

Estádio 24 de Setembro, Bissau

14 October 1994

Mauritania	1 – 1 Annulled	Guinea-Bissau
Ould Malha 25'		Mané 87'

Stade Olympique, Nouakchott
Attendance: 5,000
16 October 1994

Togo	2 – 0	Senegal
Fiawoo 50'; Salou 73'

Stade de Kégué, Lomé
Attendance: 5,000
Referee: Bortey Sulemary (Ghana)

11 November 1994

Mauritania	1 – 1	Liberia
Ould Malha 79'		N'Diaye 28' (o.g.)

Stade Olympique, Nouakchott
Attendance: 15,000
Referee: Amadou (Niger)
13 November 1994

Tunisia	1 – 1	Togo
Hamrouni 24'		Latmay 56'

Stade Olympique d'El Menzah, Tunis
Attendance: 10,000
Referee: Gamal Al-Ghandour (Egypt)
13 November 1994

Guinea-Bissau	1 – 4 Annulled	Senegal
Khome 68'		Diallo 5'; Sané 38', 65'; Diatta 73'

Estádio 24 de Setembro, Bissau

7 January 1995

Senegal	0 – 0	Tunisia

Stade Aline Sitoe Diatta, Ziguinchor
Attendance: 12,000
Referee: Sidi Bekaye Magassa (Mali)
8 January 1995

Togo	0 – 0	Mauritania

Stade de Kégué, Lomé
Attendance: 8,000
Referee: Mamadouba Camara (Guinea)

22 January 1995

Liberia	1 – 1	Senegal
Sogbie 22' (pen.)		Sané 83'

Samuel Kanyon Doe Stadium, Monrovia
Attendance: 45,000
Referee: Boubacar Alassane (Niger)
29 January 1995

Tunisia	1 – 0	Mauritania
Mahjoubi 67'

Stade Chedli Zouiten, Tunis
Attendance: 4,000
Referee: Abderrezak Nems (Algeria)

10 February 1995

Tunisia	0 – 0	Liberia

Stade Taïeb Mhiri, Sfax
Attendance: 25,000
Referee: Mohamed Kouradji (Algeria)

7 April 1995

Mauritania	0 – 1	Senegal
		Diallo 14'

Stade Olympique, Nouakchott
Attendance: 8,000
Referee: Alain Gerard Milimono (Guinea)
9 April 1995

Togo	0 – 0	Liberia

Stade de Kégué, Lomé
Attendance: 15,000
Referee: Alhagi Faye (Gambia)

22 April 1995

Senegal	5 – 1	Togo
Diallo 8' (pen.), 60'; Ndao 19', 86'; Traoré 88' (pen.)		Messa 7'

Stade de l'Amitié, Dakar
Attendance: 50,000
Referee: Lucien Bouchardeau (Niger)
23 April 1995

Liberia	1 – 0	Tunisia
Boye 64'

Samuel Kanyon Doe Stadium, Monrovia
Attendance: 35,000
Referee: Sidi Bekaye Magassa (Mali)

4 June 1995

Liberia	2 – 0	Mauritania
Debbah 25', 67'

Samuel Kanyon Doe Stadium, Monrovia
Attendance: 45,000
4 June 1995

Togo	0 – 1	Tunisia
		Hassen 9'

Stade de Kégué, Lomé
Attendance: 5,000

14 July 1995

Mauritania	2 – 1	Togo
Sidibe 12'; Wade 60'		Lantam 82'

Stade Olympique, Nouakchott
Attendance: 6,000
15 July 1995

Tunisia	4 – 0	Senegal
Berkhissa 47', 83'; Baya 56'; Hassen 69'

Stade Olympique d'El Menzah, Tunis
Attendance: 30,000

30 July 1995

Mauritania	0 – 0	Tunisia

Stade Olympique, Nouakchott
Attendance: 12,000
30 July 1995

Senegal	3 – 0	Liberia
Diallo 40' (pen.), 52'; Traoré 80'

Stade de l'Amitié, Dakar
Attendance: 20,000

=== Group 3 ===
Gambia and Niger withdrew after competing 5 matches each; their results were annulled. Central African Republic withdrew without playing any match.

Team	Pld	W	D	L	GF	GA	GD	Pts
Ghana	4	3	0	1	9	3	+6	6
Sierra Leone	4	3	0	1	7	6	+1	6
Congo	4	0	0	4	3	10	−7	0
Gambia (W)	0	0	0	0	0	0	0	0
Niger (W)	0	0	0	0	0	0	0	0
Central African Republic (W)	0	0	0	0	0	0	0	0

(W) Withdrew
4 September 1994

Ghana	4 – 1	Sierra Leone
da Costa 55' (pen.); Duah 63'; Akonnor 72'; Aboagye 88'		Conteh 87'

Accra Sports Stadium, Accra
4 September 1994

Congo	1 – 1 Annulled	Gambia
Mounkassa 64'		Johnson 38'

Stade Casimir Mvoulalea, Pointe-Noire

16 October 1994

Sierra Leone	3 – 2	Congo
Diallo 34'; Conteh 43', 53'		Baloki 33'; Imboula 86'

National Stadium, Freetown
Attendance: 6,500
16 October 1994

Niger	1 – 5 Annulled	Ghana
Hamidou 6' (pen.)		Preko 2', 54', 87'; Ayew 67'; Addo 69'

Stade Général Seyni Kountché, Niamey
Attendance: 6,000
Referee: Yacouba Ouédraogo (Burkina Faso)

12 November 1994

Gambia	1 – 2 Annulled	Ghana
Manneh 20'		Akonnor 34'; Amankwah 42'

Independence Stadium (Bakau), Bakau
Attendance: 30,000
Referee: Sackie Kennedy (Liberia)
13 November 1994

Niger	4 – 2 Annulled	Sierra Leone
Djibo 5', 22'; Ayi 55'; Ide 65'		Pieter 37'; Konté 60'

Stade Général Seyni Kountché, Niamey
Attendance: 10,000
Referee: Malloum Saleh Abba Alkali (Chad)

7 January 1995

Sierra Leone	2 – 0 Annulled	Gambia
Koroma 50'; Kanu 53'

National Stadium, Freetown
Attendance: 30,000
Referee: Daniel Forkpah (Liberia)
8 January 1995

Congo	3 – 1 Annulled	Niger
Ibara 74'; Imboula 38', 50'		Moussa 53'

Stade Alphonse Massamba, Brazzaville
Attendance: 10,000
Referee: Badibake Cinji (Zaire)

22 January 1995

Ghana	3 – 1	Congo
Ahinful 39'; Mbélé 69' (o.g.); Ayew 70'		Swing 80'

Accra Sports Stadium, Accra
Attendance: 50,000
22 January 1995

Niger	1 – 1 Annulled	Gambia
Hamidou 70'		Dramé 17'

Stade Général Seyni Kountché, Niamey
Attendance: 10,000
Referee: Papa Yeli N'Diouck (Mauritania)

8 April 1995

Sierra Leone	1 – 0	Ghana
Conteh 77' (pen.)

National Stadium, Freetown
Attendance: 50,000
9 April 1995

Gambia	1 – 1 Annulled	Congo
Kargbo 44'		Imboula 67'

Independence Stadium (Bakau), Bakau
Attendance: 10,000
Referee: Lassana Gassama (Mauritania)

22 April 1995

Congo	0 – 2	Sierra Leone
		Kallon 54'; Sama 90'

Stade Alphonse Massamba, Brazzaville
Attendance: 14,000
Referee: Ndoye (Senegal)
23 April 1995

Ghana	1 – 0 Annulled	Niger
Yeboah 21'

Accra Sports Stadium, Accra
Attendance: 40,000

3 June 1995

Sierra Leone	5 – 1 Annulled	Niger
Kallon 32'; Kallon 55', 69'; Zarppa 75'; Sama 78'		Ide 18'

National Stadium, Freetown
Attendance: 50,000
30 July 1995

Congo	0 – 2	Ghana
		Aboagye 57', 89'

Stade Alphonse Massamba, Brazzaville
Attendance: 21,000
Referee: Pinto (Angola)

=== Group 4 ===
Team	Pld	W	D	L	GF	GA	GD	Pts
Egypt	10	6	3	1	24	5	+19	15
Algeria	10	4	5	1	12	7	+5	13
Uganda	10	3	4	3	11	16	−5	10
Tanzania	10	4	0	6	14	15	−1	8
Sudan	10	3	2	5	10	14	−4	8
Ethiopia	10	2	2	6	4	18	−14	6

3 September 1994

Tanzania	4 – 0	Uganda
Salehe 5'; Lunyamila 9', 88'; Nteze 13'

National Stadium, Dar es Salaam
4 September 1994

Ethiopia	0 – 0	Algeria

Addis Ababa Stadium, Addis Ababa
Referee: Felix Tangawarima (Zimbabwe)
4 September 1994

Sudan	0 – 0	Egypt

Khartoum Stadium, Khartoum
Referee: Sylvanus Anthony Oghina (Kenya)

14 October 1994

Algeria	1 – 1	Sudan
Zouani 64'		Sabri Elhaj 11'

5 July stadium, Algiers
Attendance: 20,000
Referee: Miloud Bouchikhi (Morocco)
14 October 1994

Egypt	5 – 1	Tanzania
El-Kass 12', 52'; Salah-El-Din 64'; Hassan 82' (pen.); Fathi 84'		Tazali 55'

International Stadium, Cairo
Attendance: 40,000
15 October 1994

Uganda	4 – 1	Ethiopia
Mutyaba 55'; Tamale 75'; Buwembo 79'; Semogerere 84'		Elias 21'

Nakivubo Stadium, Kampala
Attendance: 11,000

11 November 1994

Egypt	5 – 0	Ethiopia
Hassan 24', 36'; Sary 30'; Salah-El-Din 56'; Farouk 57'	Report

International Stadium, Cairo
Attendance: 30,000
12 November 1994

Tanzania	2 – 0	Sudan
Selemani 26', 61'

National Stadium, Dar es Salaam
Attendance: 20,000
12 November 1994

Uganda	1 – 1	Algeria
Semogerere 70' (pen.)		Tasfaout 43'

Nakivubo Stadium, Kampala
Attendance: 25,000
Referee: Bruce Mayhola (South Africa)

8 January 1995

Algeria	1 – 0	Egypt
Dziri 16' (pen.)	Report

5 July stadium, Algiers
Attendance: 60,000
Referee: Falla N'Doye (Senegal)
8 January 1995

Ethiopia	1 – 0	Tanzania
Juhar 33'

Stade Haile Selassie, Addis Ababa
Attendance: 33,000
Referee: Charles Baku Ndukize (Burundi)
8 January 1995

Sudan	3 – 1	Uganda
Nemairi Ahmed Saeed 9', 34'; Amir Mustafa 81'		Musisi 22'

Al Merreikh Stadium, Omdurman
Attendance: 8,000
Referee: Ladoual Hissein (Chad)

21 January 1995

Tanzania	2 – 1	Algeria
Kidishi 37'; Selemani 66'		Kaci-Said 13'

National Stadium, Dar es Salaam
Attendance: 20,000
Referee: Martin Omondi Bita (Kenya)
21 January 1995

Uganda	0 – 0	Egypt

Nakivubo Stadium, Kampala
Attendance: 10,000
22 January 1995

Ethiopia	2 – 0	Sudan
Kebede 4'; Sessaye 71'

Stade Haile Selassie, Addis Ababa
Attendance: 8,000
Referee: Omer Yengo (Congo)

7 April 1995

Algeria	2 – 0	Ethiopia
Tasfaout 17', 32'

5 July stadium, Algiers
Attendance: 25,000
Referee: Mahmoud Hosni (Tunisia)
7 April 1995

Egypt	3 – 1	Sudan
Aboul-Dahab 10'; El-Sawy 70'; El-Kass 88'		Edward Jildo 71'

Alexandria Stadium, Alexandria
Attendance: 35,000
Referee: Said Belqola (Morocco)
8 April 1995

Uganda	2 – 0	Tanzania
Obwiny 30'; Mutyaba 38'

Nakivubo Stadium, Kampala
Attendance: 25,000

22 April 1995

Tanzania	1 – 2	Egypt
Selemani 89'		Aboul-Dahab 27', 68'

National Stadium, Dar es Salaam
Attendance: 35,000
23 April 1995

Ethiopia	0 – 0	Uganda

Stade Haile Selassie, Addis Ababa
Attendance: 30,000
Referee: Abogno (Kenya)
24 April 1995

Sudan	2 – 0 Original score 0 – 2 Awarded score	Algeria
Babiker Elhilou 22' (pen.); Khogali 74'

Al-Hilal Stadium, Omdurman
Attendance: 30,000
Referee: Abdulsattar Abdulfattah (Egypt)

Match awarded 2–0 to Algeria following a protest to CAF.

2 June 1995

Algeria	1 – 1	Uganda
Tasfaout 16'	Report	Mutyaba 76'

5 July stadium, Algiers
Attendance: 40,000
Referee: Abdelaziz Bellaftouh (Morocco)
3 June 1995

Sudan	2 – 1	Tanzania
Zahir Markaz 13'; Anas Elnour 60'		Nteze 36'

Al-Hilal Stadium, Omdurman
Attendance: 15,000
4 June 1995

Ethiopia	0 – 2	Egypt
		Aboul-Dahab 7'; Khashaba 38'

Addis Ababa Stadium, Addis Ababa
Attendance: 30,000
Referee: Badibake Cinji (Zaire)

14 July 1995

Egypt	1 – 1	Algeria
El-Masry 61'	Report	Kaci-Saïd 42'

Cairo International Stadium, Cairo
Attendance: 100,000
15 July 1995

Tanzania	2 – 0	Ethiopia
Hussein 8'; Lunyamila 11'

National Stadium, Dar es Salaam
Attendance: 10,000
15 July 1995

Uganda	2 – 0	Sudan
Semogerere 71'; Barigye 74'

Nakivubo Stadium, Kampala
Attendance: 25,000

30 July 1995

Algeria	2 – 1	Tanzania
Marsha 29' (o.g.); Amrouche 59'		Hussein 21'

5 July stadium, Algiers
Attendance: 45,000
Referee: Mahmoud Hosni (Tunisia)
30 July 1995

Egypt	6 – 0	Uganda
El-Kass 4', 65', 73'; Sary 8', 43'; Abougreisha 36'	Report

Alexandria Stadium, Alexandria
Attendance: 50,000
Referee: Cherif Boubacar Mbaye (Senegal)
30 July 1995

Sudan	3 – 0	Ethiopia
Muntasir Elzaki 15'; Edward Jildo 36'; Essam Osman 52'

Al-Hilal Stadium, Omdurman

=== Group 5 ===
South Africa withdrew from qualification (played 3 matches) after they were awarded hosting rights. They were replaced by Kenya, which later withdrew.
Madagascar withdrew after one match (lost to South Africa). Seychelles withdrew before playing any match. All results of the withdrawn teams were annulled.

Team	Pld	W	D	L	GF	GA	GD	Pts
Gabon	4	3	0	1	8	2	+6	6
Zambia	4	3	0	1	7	2	+5	6
Mauritius	4	0	0	4	0	11	−11	0
South Africa (H)	0	0	0	0	0	0	0	0
Madagascar (W)	0	0	0	0	0	0	0	0
Seychelles (W)	0	0	0	0	0	0	0	0

(H) Awarded hosting rights; (W) Withdrew

Awarded hosting rights

4 September 1994

Madagascar	0 – 1 Annulled	South Africa
		Masinga 21'

Mahamasina Municipal Stadium, Antananarivo
Attendance: 35,000
Referee: Martin Bita (Kenya)

15 October 1994

South Africa	1 – 0 Annulled	Mauritius
Masinga 51'

Odi Stadium, Mabopane
Attendance: 12,000
Referee: Charles Massembe (Uganda)

13 November 1994

Gabon	3 – 0	Mauritius
Amégasse 26' (pen.); Bekogo 28'; Mackaya 64'

Stade Omnisports, Libreville
Attendance: 25,000
13 November 1994

Zambia	1 – 1 Annulled	South Africa
Malitoli 86' (pen.)		Doctor Khumalo 68'

Independence Stadium, Lusaka
Attendance: 40,000
Referee: Alem Assefa (Ethiopia)

20 November 1994

Gabon	2 – 1	Zambia
Ondo 60' (pen.); Nzamba 73'		Nyirenda 89'

Stade Omnisports, Libreville
Attendance: 20,000
Referee: Obafemi (Nigeria)

9 January 1995

Mauritius	0 – 3	Zambia
		K.Bwalya 32', 87'; J.Bwalya 76'

Stade George V, Curepipe
Attendance: 34,000
Referee: Pinto (Angola)

8 April 1995

Zambia	1 – 0	Gabon
K.Bwalya 83'

Independence Stadium, Lusaka
Attendance: 40,000

4 June 1995

Mauritius	0 – 3	Gabon
		Mackaya 42'; Ondo 47', 88'

Stade George V, Curepipe
Attendance: 28,000
Referee: Williams (South Africa)

15 July 1995

Zambia	2 – 0	Mauritius
Lota 57'; J.Bwalya 72'

Independence Stadium, Lusaka
Attendance: 35,000

=== Group 6 ===
Team	Pld	W	D	L	GF	GA	GD	Pts
Angola	10	6	2	2	17	8	+9	14
Mozambique	10	6	2	2	16	8	+8	14
Guinea	10	5	2	3	17	9	+8	12
Mali	10	5	1	4	15	10	+5	11
Namibia	10	1	5	4	8	16	−8	7
Botswana	10	0	2	8	5	27	−22	2

4 September 1994

Angola	2 – 0	Namibia
Túbia 6'; Merodack 40'

Estádio da Cidadela, Luanda
4 September 1994

Botswana	0 – 1	Guinea
		T. Camara 89'

National Stadium, Gaborone
4 September 1994

Mali	2 – 1	Mozambique
Sidibé 20', 30'		Matola 69'

Stade Modibo Kéïta, Bamako
Referee: Mohamed Belahmer (Morocco)

15 October 1994

Namibia	2 – 1	Mali
Goraseb 40' van Wyk 57'		Traoré 89'

Independence Stadium, Windhoek
Attendance: 7,000
16 October 1994

Guinea	3 – 1	Angola
Soumah 6', 59'; T. Camara 9'		Castella 69'

Stade du 28 Septembre, Conakry
Attendance: 12,000
Referee: Boubacar Alassane (Niger)
16 October 1994

Mozambique	3 – 1	Botswana
Arnaldo 34', 39', 73'		Pikati 74'

Estádio da Machava, Maputo
Attendance: 9,000
Referee: Roger Milson Raharison (Madagascar)

30 October 1994

Mali	2 – 0	Guinea
Touré 45'; Diallo 75'

Stade Modibo Kéïta, Bamako
Attendance: 30,000
Referee: Omer Yengo (Congo)

13 November 1994

Mali	0 – 0	Angola

Stade Modibo Kéïta, Bamako
Attendance: 20,000
Referee: Malick Sillan (Gambia)
13 November 1994

Mozambique	2 – 1	Guinea
Tchaka-Tchaka 64' (pen.); Tico-Tico 89'		Sylla 20'

Estádio da Machava, Maputo
Attendance: 50,000
Referee: Wilbert Onath (Seychelles)
13 November 1994

Namibia	1 – 1	Botswana
van Wyk 89'		Modise 25'

Independence Stadium, Windhoek
Attendance: 5,000

7 January 1995

Botswana	1 – 3	Mali
Duiker 75'		Touré 5'; Diawara 18', 26'

National Stadium, Gaborone
Referee: Wallace Mabuza (Swaziland)
8 January 1995

Angola	1 – 0	Mozambique
Túbia 19'

Estádio da Cidadela, Luanda
8 January 1995

Guinea	3 – 0	Namibia
A. Camara 62'; Sow 69'; Sylla 88'

Stade du 28 Septembre, Conakry
Referee: Emmanuel Okoampah (Ghana)

22 January 1995

Botswana	1 – 2	Angola
Paul 44'		Paulão 55', 63'

National Stadium, Gaborone
Attendance: 10,000
22 January 1995

Mozambique	4 – 2	Namibia
Nuro 6', 30', 90'; Eurico 68'		Hoeseb 72'; Boonstaander 90'

Estádio da Machava, Maputo
Attendance: 22,000
Referee: Jugdish Kisoona (Mauritius)

9 April 1995

Namibia	2 – 2	Angola
Richter 11'; Goraseb 61'		Paulão 8'; Quinzinho 76'

Independence Stadium, Windhoek
Attendance: 5,000
9 April 1995

Guinea	5 – 0	Botswana
F. Camara 6', 10'; Sylla 54'; Diané 60'; Sow 88'

Stade du 28 Septembre, Conakry
Attendance: 50,000
Referee: Sackie Kennedy (Liberia)
9 April 1995

Mozambique	1 – 0	Mali
Chiquinho Conde 44'

Estádio da Machava, Maputo
Attendance: 40,000
Referee: Pradeep Kumar Sohan (Mauritius)

23 April 1995

Angola	3 – 0	Guinea
Akwá 48', 75'; Paulão 55'

Estádio da Cidadela, Luanda
Attendance: 22,000
23 April 1995

Botswana	0 – 3	Mozambique
		Chiquinho Conde 15', 53'; Nuro 69'

National Stadium, Gaborone
Attendance: 15,000
23 April 1995

Mali	2 – 0	Namibia
Sidibé 16'; Magassouba 66'

Stade Modibo Kéïta, Bamako
Attendance: 30,000
Referee: Bruce Kouahlin (Togo)

4 June 1995

Angola	1 – 0	Mali
Akwá 28' (pen.)

Estádio da Cidadela, Luanda
Attendance: 80,000
Referee: Amuam Aka (Cameroon)
4 June 1995

Botswana	1 – 1	Namibia
Dintle 5'		Ananias 18'

National Stadium, Gaborone
Attendance: 2,000
4 June 1995

Guinea	0 – 0	Mozambique

Stade du 28 Septembre, Conakry
Attendance: 60,000

16 July 1995

Mali	4 – 0	Botswana
Diawara 12', 50'; Traoré 46'; Bagayogo 85'

Stade Modibo Kéïta, Bamako
Attendance: 20,000
Referee: Ahmed Jalloh (Sierra Leone)
16 July 1995

Mozambique	2 – 1	Angola
Faife 15'; Nana 46'		Paulão 75'

Estádio da Machava, Maputo
Attendance: 50,000
Referee: Mady Kanoso Bora (Madagascar)
16 July 1995

Namibia	0 – 0	Guinea

Independence Stadium, Windhoek
Attendance: 2,000

30 July 1995

Angola	4 – 0	Botswana
Joni 1', 9'; Rosário 43'; Paulão 50'

Estádio da Cidadela, Luanda
Attendance: 25,000
30 July 1995

Guinea	4 – 1	Mali
T. Camara 28', 45'; Sow 65' (pen.); M. Camara 87'		Diawara 13'

Stade du 28 Septembre, Conakry
Attendance: 20,000
30 July 1995

Namibia	0 – 0	Mozambique

Independence Stadium, Windhoek
Attendance: 10,000
Referee: Joel Dwarf Mondoka (Zambia)

=== Group 7 ===
Benin, Cape Verde and Equatorial Guinea withdrew without playing any matches.

Team	Pld	W	D	L	GF	GA	GD	Pts
Burkina Faso	4	1	3	0	5	4	+1	5
Ivory Coast	4	1	2	1	5	4	+1	4
Morocco	4	1	1	2	2	4	−2	3
Benin (W)	0	0	0	0	0	0	0	0
Cape Verde (W)	0	0	0	0	0	0	0	0
Equatorial Guinea (W)	0	0	0	0	0	0	0	0

(W) Withdrew
4 September 1994

Burkina Faso	2 – 1	Morocco
Ouédraogo 49'; Ouattara 68'		El-Khalej 32'

Stade du 4 Août, Ouagadougou
Referee: Idrissa Sarr (Mauritania)

13 November 1994

Morocco	1 – 0	Ivory Coast
Nader 15'

Stade Mohamed V, Casablanca
Attendance: 12,000

22 January 1995

Ivory Coast	2 – 2	Burkina Faso
Tiéhi 7', 43'		Napon 50'; Traoré 80'

Stade Félix Houphouët-Boigny, Abidjan
Attendance: 20,000

9 April 1995

Morocco	0 – 0	Burkina Faso

Moulay Abdellah Stadium, Rabat
Attendance: 45,000

4 June 1995

Ivory Coast	2 – 0	Morocco
Tiéhi 19'; Bamba 65'

Stade Félix Houphouët-Boigny, Abidjan
Attendance: 45,000
Referee: Békaye Magassa (Mali)

30 July 1995

Burkina Faso	1 – 1	Ivory Coast
Ouattara 22'		Tiéhi 64'

Stade du 4 Août, Ouagadougou
Attendance: 40,000
Referee: Olanjan (Nigeria)

== Qualified teams ==
- Algeria
- Angola
- Burkina Faso
- Cameroon
- Ivory Coast
- Egypt
- Gabon
- Ghana
- Liberia
- Mozambique
- Nigeria (holders)*
- Sierra Leone
- South Africa (hosts)
- Tunisia
- Zaire
- Zambia

* Nigeria withdrew prior to the start of the finals. Guinea, as the best side to not qualify, was offered Nigeria's spot in the finals, but declined due to a lack of preparation time.
