= Angola national football team results (1976–1999) =

- Win Draw Loss

This is a list of the Angola national football team results from 1976 to 1999.

== 1976 ==
8 February 1976 Friendly	Congo	3–2	Angola	Congo
	Minga; Mpele; Ndomba		Gyovetty; Nelson

15 February 1976 Friendly	Angola	1–1	Congo	Angola

12 July 1976 Friendly	São Tomé and Príncipe	0–3	Angola	São Tomé and Príncipe
			Praia; Tozé; Giovetty

== 1977 ==
26 June 1977 Friendly	Angola	1–0	Cuba	Angola
	Alves			Stadium: Estádio da Cidadela, Luanda; Attendance: 50,000

29 June 1977 Friendly	Angola	1–0	Cuba	Angola

2 July 1977 Friendly	Angola	2–4	Cuba	Angola
	Alves; Praia

== 1978 ==
18 May 1978 Friendly	Angola	1–0	Cuba	Angola
	Ndunguidi

18 May 1978 Friendly	Angola	1–0	Cuba	Angola

21 May 1978 Friendly	Angola	0–1	Cuba	Angola

3 June 1978 Friendly	Angola	5–3	Gambia	Estádio da Várzea, Praia, Cape Verde
	João Machado 7', 15'; Giovetty 43'; Quim Sebas; Dedé

5 June 1978 Friendly	Cape Verde	0–1	Angola	Cape Verde
			Joaquim Dinis

10 July 1978 Friendly	São Tomé and Príncipe	3–3	Angola	São Tomé and Príncipe
	Aturzinho, ?		Silva 4'; Joaquim Dinis 34'; Machado 40'

12 July 1978 Friendly	São Tomé and Príncipe	0–2	Angola	São Tomé and Príncipe

17 October 1978 Friendly	Cuba	1–2	Angola	Cuba
	?		Ndunguidi 5'; Giovetty 12'

== 1979 ==
12 July 1979 Friendly	São Tomé and Príncipe	1–2	Angola	São Tomé and Príncipe
			Ndunguidi; Jesus

25 November 1979 Friendly	Angola	1–0	Gabon	Angola

27 November 1979 Friendly	Angola	0–1	Cameroon	Angola

29 November 1979 Friendly	Angola	0–1	Congo	Angola

== 1980 ==
1 November 1980 Friendly	Zambia	0–0	Angola	Zambia

2 November 1980 Friendly	Zambia	1–1	Angola	Zambia

9 November 1980 Friendly	Angola	1–1	Mozambique	Angola
	Jesus

11 November 1980 Friendly	Angola	1–1	Tunisia	Angola

16 November 1980 1982 African Cup of Nations qualification	Angola	1–1	Congo	Estádio dos Coqueiros, Luanda
	Ndunguidi		Massamba	Referee: Kambaji Kabongo (Zaire)

30 November 1980 1982 African Cup of Nations qualification	Congo	0–0	Angola	Stade Alphonse Massemba-Débat, Brazzaville

== 1981 ==
4 April 1981 Friendly	Nigeria	1–1	Angola	Ahmadu Bello Stadium, Nigeria

23 June 1981 Friendly	Madagascar	1–1	Angola	Madagascar

25 June 1981 Friendly	Mozambique	0–1	Angola	Mozambique
	Amandio

27 June 1981 Friendly	Angola	1–1	Zimbabwe	Mozambique
	Joseph Maluka

== 1982 ==
13 October 1982 1984 African Cup of Nations qualification	Gabon	2–2	Angola	Stade Omar Bongo, Libreville
	Avah 20', 58'		Machado 4'; Sarmento 78'

14 November 1982 1984 African Cup of Nations qualification	Angola	4–0	Gabon	Estádio da Cidadela, Luanda
	Machado 45'; Maluka 55'; Vata 80'; Chico Dinis 88'

== 1983 ==
9 April 1983 1984 African Cup of Nations qualification	Nigeria	2–0	Angola	Surulere Stadium, Lagos
	Adeshina ?

24 April 1983 1984 African Cup of Nations qualification	Angola	1–0	Nigeria	Estádio da Cidadela, Luanda
	Ndunguidi

== 1984 ==
1 July 1984	Angola	1–0	Senegal	Luanda, Angola
	Ivo 57'			Stadium: Estádio dos Coqueiros; Referee: Simon Bantsimba (Congo)

15 July 1984	Senegal	1–0 (a.e.t.) (3–4 p)	Angola	Dakar, Senegal
	Sèye 24'			Stadium: Stade Demba Diop; Referee: Paul Alain Hioba-Hioba (Cameroon)

== 1985 ==
31 March 1985 1986 World Cup qualification	Angola	0–0	Algeria	Luanda, Angola
				Stadium: Estádio dos Coqueiros; Attendance: 20 000; Referee: Karim Camara (Guinea)

19 April 1985 1986 World Cup qualification	Algeria	3–2	Angola	Algiers, Algeria
	Mansouri 14'; Menad 42'; Bouiche 65'		Jesus 78'; Machado 83'	Stadium: Stade 5 Juillet 1962; Attendance: 50 000; Referee: Idrissa Traoré (Mali)

23 June 1985 Friendly	Mozambique	0-3	Angola	Maputo, Mozambique
			Jesus	Stadium: Estádio da Machava

30 June 1985 Torneio dos 5 de 1985	Angola	3-2	São Tomé and Príncipe	Praia, Cape Verde
	Ndunguidi, Jesus			Stadium: Estádio da Várzea

2 July 1985 Torneio dos 5 de 1985 (semi-finals)	Mozambique	3-2	Angola	Estádio da Várzea, Praia, Cape Verde
			Jesus	Stadium: Estádio da Várzea

3 July 1985 Torneio dos 5 de 1985	Angola	3-1	Guinea-Bissau	Estádio da Várzea, Praia, Cape Verde
	Nsuka, Abreu

7 July 1985 Torneio da Amizade de 1985 (semi-finals)	Cape Verde	0-0 (PEN 3-4)	Angola	Estádio da Fontinha, Mindelo, Cape Verde

9 July 1985 Torneio da Amizade de 1985 (final)	Angola	1-0	Mozambique	Estádio Municipal Adérito Sena
	Jesus

== 1986 ==
5 October 1986 1988 African Cup of Nations qualification	Angola	1–0	Gabon	Estádio dos Coqueiros, Luanda
	Bolingó

19 October 1986 1988 African Cup of Nations qualification	Gabon	1–0 (3–5 p)	Angola	Libreville
	Anotho 68'

== 1987 ==
29 March 1987 1988 African Cup of Nations qualification	Zaire	3–0	Angola	Kinshasa
	Tueba; Santos; Nkama			Referee: Kabalamuna Chayu (Zambia)

11 April 1987 1988 African Cup of Nations qualification	Angola	1–0	Zaire	Luanda
	Jesus 19' (pen.)			Referee: Gabriel Ondziel-Dinga (Congo)

18 April 1987 1987 Central African Games (group stage)	Angola	3-3	Congo
	Avelino 12'; Jesus 22', 75'

21 April 1987 1987 Central African Games (group stage)	Zaire	1-2	Angola

27 April 1987 1987 Central African Games (Semi-final)	Angola	1-0	Gabon	Stade Alphonse Massemba-Débat, Brazzaville, Congo
	Jesus

30 April 1987 1987 Central African Games (final)	Cameroon	2-0	Angola	Stade Alphonse Massemba-Débat, Brazzaville, Congo

24 October 1987 Friendly	Zambia	2–0	Angola	Zambia

29 November 1987 Friendly	Gabon	0–0	Angola	Gabon

8 December 1987 Tournament international 10 December 1987 (semi-finals)	Angola	3–2	Cuba	Angola

10 December 1987 tournament international 10 December 1987 (final)	Angola	0–0 (Pen 4-2)	Benin	Angola

== 1988 ==
22 June 1988 Friendly	Mozambique	0–1	Angola	Mozambique

26 June 1988 Friendly	Mozambique	0–1	Angola	Mozambique

1 August 1988 Friendly	Angola	4–1	Gabon	Angola
	Mavó,, Quim Sebas

7 August 1988	Angola	0–0	Sudan	Estádio da Cidadela, Luanda
				Attendance: 15,000; Referee: Modjiri Ubi Kemuare (Zaire)

11 November 1988	Sudan	1–2	Angola	Al Merreikh Stadium, Khartoum
	Osama Idris 7'		Vieira Dias 79'; Mavó 85'	Attendance: 8,000; Referee: Osman Mohamud Halane (Somalia)

2 October 1988	Angola	4–1	Equatorial Guinea	Luanda
	Mendinho 43'; Barbosa 46'; Vieira Dias 54', 89'		61' Pedro	Referee: Wa Ntambidila (Zaire)

16 October 1988	Equatorial Guinea	0–0	Angola	Malabo
				Referee: Pierre Alain Mounguengui (Gabon)

29 October 1988 Friendly	Algeria	1–1	Angola	Algeria
	Saïd Hamrani 65'		Mavó 38'	Stadium: Stade Aoued-Meflah

8 November 1988 Friendly	Tunisia	5–0	Angola	Tunisia
	Khaled Ben Yahia 16'; Faozi Henchiri 22', 45'; Mohamed Ali Mahjoubi 67'; Abdelkar Rakbaoui 76'			Stadium: Stade Olympique d'EL Menzah

30 December 1988 Friendly	Zaire	0–0	Angola	Zaire

== 1989 ==
8 January 1989	Cameroon	1–1	Angola	Stade Omnisports, Yaoundé
	Djonkep 75'		Jesus 11'	Attendance: 50,000; Referee: Dodji Hounnake-Kouassi (Togo)

22 January 1989	Angola	2–2	Nigeria	Estádio da Cidadela, Luanda
	Vieira Dias 30'; Jesus 62'		Keshi 8'; Obiku 67'	Attendance: 60,000; Referee: Joel Mondoka (Zambia)

29 March 1989 Friendly	Portugal	6–0	Angola	Estádio José Alvalade, Lisbon
	Oliveira 20'; Frederico 39', 87'; António André 54'; Nunes 56'; Semedo 63'			Attendance: 25000; Referee: Ramos Marcos Spain

9 April 1989	Angola	0–2	Ivory Coast	Luanda
				Referee: Gaston Engoua (Congo)

14 April 1989 Friendly	Angola	1–1	Mozambique	Angola

23 April 1989	Ivory Coast	4–1	Angola	Abidjan
	Bamba; Traoré (pen.); Amani		Ralph (pen.)	Referee: Louis Laryea (Ghana)

16 May 1989 Friendly	Namibia	0–1	Angola	Namibia

11 June 1989	Angola	2–0	Gabon	Estádio da Cidadela, Luanda
	Maluka 7', 28'			Referee: Celestin N'Cho (Ivory Coast)

25 June 1989	Angola	1–2	Cameroon	Estádio da Cidadela, Luanda
	Paulão 5'		Omam-Biyik 59'; Kana-Biyik 70'	Attendance: 60,000; Referee: Simon Bantsimba (Congo)

12 August 1989	Nigeria	1–0	Angola	National Stadium, Lagos
	Keshi 44'			Attendance: 100,000; Referee: Dodji Hounnake-Kouassi (Togo)

27 August 1989	Gabon	1–0	Angola	Stade Omnisports, Libreville
	Minko 24'			Referee: Abdellah Naciri (Morocco)

== 1990 ==
6 March 1990 1990 SADCC Cup	Mozambique	2-1	Angola	Estádio da Machava, Maputo, Mozambique
	Dinis 31'; S. Butana 90'		Moluzi 75'

7 March 1990 1990 SADCC Cup	Angola	1-0; 2-3	Zambia B
Note: Angola won 1-0, but in the 88th minute stadium light out, the match was then repleyed and Zambia won

8 March 1990 1990 SADCC Cup	Angola	0-2	Zimbabwe	Estádio da Machava, Maputo, Mozambique
			Mucherahowa 49'; Carlos Max 72'

10 March 1990 1990 SADCC Cup	Angola	3-1	Lesotho	Estádio da Machava, Maputo
	Mona 18'; Ndunguidi 42'; Zequita 44'

19 August 1990 1992 African Cup of Nations qualification	Angola	0–1	Madagascar	Estádio da Cidadela, Luanda
			Randrianaivo 60'

30 August 1990 Friendly	Mozambique	0–2	Angola	Mozambique

2 September 1990 1992 African Cup of Nations qualification	Swaziland	1–1	Angola	Somhlolo National Stadium, Lobamba
	Terblanche 89'		Chico 10'

== 1991 ==
14 April 1991 1992 African Cup of Nations qualification	Angola	1–2	Zambia	Estádio da Cidadela, Luanda
	Saavedra 62'		Bwalya 55'; Mbasela 87'	Attendance: 15,000; Referee: Bester Kalombo (Malawi)

4 May 1991 1992 African Cup of Nations qualification	Madagascar	0–0	Angola	Mahamasina Municipal Stadium, Antananarivo
				Attendance: 12,000

15 July 1991 1992 African Cup of Nations qualification	Angola	1–1	Swaziland	Estádio da Cidadela, Luanda
	Felito 40' (pen.)		Matse 48'	Attendance: 20,000

28 July 1991 1992 African Cup of Nations qualification	Zambia	1–0	Angola	Independence Stadium, Lusaka
	Musonda 89'			Referee: Wilfred Mukuna (Zimbabwe)

== 1992 ==
11 October 1992	Egypt	1–0	Angola	Osman Ahmed Osman Stadium, Cairo, Egypt
	H. Hassan 63'			Referee: Rachid Ben Khedija (Tunisia)

== 1993 ==
10 January 1993 1994 WCQ	Angola	1–1	Zimbabwe	Estádio da Cidadela, Luanda, Angola
	Russo 60'		Sawu 25'	Referee: Kalumba Kabuya (Zaire)

18 January 1993 1994 WCQ	Angola	0–0	Egypt	Estádio da Cidadela, Luanda, Angola
				Referee: Eric Blareau (Belgium)

31 January 1993 1994 WCQ	Zimbabwe	2–1	Angola	National Sports Stadium, Harare, Zimbabwe
	Sawu 17'; P. Ndlovu 61'		Neto 44'	Referee: Karamchand Teeluckdharry (Mauritius)

28 February 1993 1994 WCQ	Togo	0–1	Angola	Stade de Kégué, Lomé, Togo
			Paulão 83'	Attendance: 2,427; Referee: Ousmane Souleymane Diallo (Burkina Faso)

== 1994 ==
19 March 1994 Friendly	Angola	2–1	Gabon	Angola

4 September 1994 1996 African Cup of Nations qualification	Angola	2–0	Namibia	Estádio da Cidadela, Luanda
	Túbia 6'; Merodack 40'

16 October 1994 1996 African Cup of Nations qualification	Guinea	3–1	Angola	Stade du 28 Septembre, Conakry
	Soumah 6', 59'; T. Camara 9'		Castella 69'	Attendance: 12,000; Referee: Boubacar Alassane (Niger)

13 November 1994 1996 African Cup of Nations qualification	Mali	0–0	Angola	Stade Modibo Kéïta, Bamako
				Attendance: 20,000; Referee: Malick Sillan (Gambia)

== 1995 ==
8 January 1995 1996 African Cup of Nations qualification	Angola	1–0	Mozambique	Estádio da Cidadela, Luanda
	Túbia 19'

22 January 1995 1996 African Cup of Nations qualification	Botswana	1–2	Angola	National Stadium, Gaborone
	Paul 44'		Paulão 55', 63'	Attendance: 10,000

9 April 1995 1996 African Cup of Nations qualification	Namibia	2–2	Angola	Independence Stadium, Windhoek
	Richter 11'; Goraseb 61'		Paulão 8'; Quinzinho 76'	Attendance: 5,000

23 April 1995 1996 African Cup of Nations qualification	Angola	3–0	Guinea	Estádio da Cidadela, Luanda
	Akwá 48', 75'; Paulão 55'			Attendance: 22,000

4 June 1995 1996 African Cup of Nations qualification	Angola	1–0	Mali	Estádio da Cidadela, Luanda
	Akwá 28' (pen.)			Attendance: 80,000; Referee: Amuam Aka (Cameroon)

16 July 1995 1996 African Cup of Nations qualification	Mozambique	2–1	Angola	Estádio da Machava, Maputo
	Faife 15'; Nana 46'		Paulão 75'	Attendance: 50,000; Referee: Mady Kanoso Bora (Madagascar)

30 July 1995 1996 African Cup of Nations qualification	Angola	4–0	Botswana	Estádio da Cidadela, Luanda
	Joni 1', 9'; Rosário 43'; Paulão 50'			Attendance: 25,000

== 1996 ==
15 January 1996 1996 African Cup of Nations	Egypt	2–1	Angola	FNB Stadium, Johannesburg
	El-Kass 30', 33'		Quinzinho 77'	Attendance: 6,000; Referee: Sidi Bekaye Magassa (Mali)

20 January 1996 1996 African Cup of Nations	South Africa	1–0	Angola	FNB Stadium, Johannesburg
	Williams 57'			Attendance: 28,000; Referee: Fethi Boucetta (Tunisia)

24 January 1996 1996 African Cup of Nations	Angola	3–3	Cameroon	Kings Park Stadium, Durban
	Joni 38' (pen.); Paulão 57'; Quinzinho 80'		Omam-Biyik 25'; Mouyeme 82'; Hélder Vicente 90' (o.g.)	Attendance: 6,000; Referee: Mohamed Kouradji (Algeria)

1 June 1996 1998 WCQ	Uganda	0–2	Angola	Nakivubo Stadium, Kampala
16:30		Report	Da Silva 35' (pen.); Paulão 60' (pen.)	Attendance: 12,000; Referee: Isaack Omar Abdulkadir (Tanzania)

16 June 1996 1998 WCQ	Angola	3–1	Uganda	Estádio da Cidadela, Luanda
15:30	Paulão 1', 58'; Paulo Silva 7'	Report	Robert Kizito 3'	Attendance: 30,000; Referee: Goshen Hatimbula (Zambia)

6 October 1996	Ghana	2–1	Angola	Accra Sports Stadium, Accra
	Aboagye 7'; Kim Grant 30'		Paulão 2'	Attendance: 34,000; Referee: Jean-Fidèle Diramba (Gabon)

10 November 1996 1998 WCQ	Angola	2–1	Zimbabwe	Estádio da Cidadela, Luanda
15:30	Akwá 43'; Paulão 51'	Report	Ndlovu 60'	Attendance: 60,000; Referee: Gamal Al-Ghandour (Egypt)

== 1997 ==
12 January 1997 1998 WCQ	Cameroon	0–0	Angola	Stade Ahmadou Ahidjo, Yaoundé
15:30		Report		Attendance: 75,000; Referee: Said Belqola (Morocco)

23 February 1997	Zimbabwe	1–0	Angola	National Sports Stadium, Harare
	Mugeyi 31' (pen.)			Attendance: 45,000

30 March 1997 Friendly	Mozambique	1–2	Angola	Mozambique

6 April 1997 1998 WCQ	Angola	3–1	Togo	Estádio da Cidadela, Luanda
15:00	Paulão 29'; Akwá 45'; Sousa 51'	Report	Oyawolé 21'	Attendance: 30,000; Referee: Emmanuel Okoampah (Ghana)

27 April 1997 1998 WCQ	Zimbabwe	0–0	Angola	National Sports Stadium, Harare
15:00		Report		Attendance: 47,257; Referee: Ian McLeod (South Africa)

8 June 1997 1998 WCQ	Angola	1–1	Cameroon	Estádio da Cidadela, Luanda
15:00	Akwá 55'	Report	Mboma 47'	Attendance: 60,000; Referee: Charles Masembe (Uganda)

22 June 1997	Angola	1–0	Ghana	Estádio da Cidadela, Luanda
	Akwá 23'			Attendance: 10,000

27 July 1997	Angola	2–1	Zimbabwe	Estádio da Cidadela, Luanda
	Aurélio 9'; Akwá 70'		Murisa 80'	Attendance: 32,000

17 August 1997 1998 WCQ	Togo	1–1	Angola	Stade de Kégué, Lomé
14:00	Ouadja 47'	Report	Quinzinho 43'	Attendance: 4,500; Referee: Sidi Magassa (Mali)

== 1998 ==
14 January 1998 Friendly	Morocco	2–1	Angola	Morocco
	Hadji 51'; Ouakili 58'		Rossi 35' (o.g.)	Stadium: Stade Mohamed V

28 January 1998 Friendly	Cameroon	1–0	Angola	Cameroon
	Song 25'

8 February 1998 1998 African Cup of Nations	South Africa	0–0	Angola	Stade Municipal, Bobo-Dioulasso
15:00				Attendance: 20,000; Referee: Sidi Bekaye Magassa (Mali)

12 February 1998 1998 African Cup of Nations	Angola	3–3	Namibia	Stade Municipal, Bobo-Dioulasso
18:15	Lázaro 46'; Paulo Silva 67' (pen.); Miguel Pereira 86'		Uri Khob 20', 51'; Nauseb 33'	Attendance: 2,000; Referee: Falla N'Doye (Senegal)

16 February 1998 1998 African Cup of Nations	Ivory Coast	5–2	Angola	Stade Municipal, Ouagadougou
20:00	Guel 8', 23'; Tiéhi 43', 81' (pen.); Bakayoko 56'		Paulo Silva 27'; Quinzinho 52'	Attendance: 4,000; Referee: Maxime Camara (Guinea)

2 August 1998 2000 African Cup of Nations qualification	Benin	2–1	Angola	Stade de l'Amitié, Cotonou
	Tchomogo 6', 32'		Chicangala 36'	Attendance: 8,000; Referee: Ibrahim Djingarey Amadou (Niger)

16 August 1998 2000 African Cup of Nations qualification	Angola	2–0	Benin	Estádio da Cidadela, Luanda
	Akwá			Attendance: 16,000; Referee: Bisingu Buenkadila (DR Congo)

3 October 1998 2000 African Cup of Nations qualification	South Africa	1–0	Angola	First National Bank Stadium, Johannesburg
	Bartlett 86'			Attendance: 25,000; Referee: Homary Mohamady (Madagascar)

== 1999 ==
24 January 1999 2000 African Cup of Nations qualification	Angola	3–1	Gabon	Estádio da Cidadela, Luanda
	Akwá 7', 51', 90'		Mouloungui 34'	Attendance: 15,000; Referee: Abdulkadir Isaack Omar (Tanzania)

28 February 1999 2000 African Cup of Nations qualification	Angola	0–2	Mauritius	Estádio da Cidadela, Luanda
			Perle 29'; Bax 84'	Attendance: 25,000

10 April 1999 2000 African Cup of Nations qualification	Mauritius	1–1	Angola	Stade George V, Curepipe
	Perle 31'		Bodunha 16'	Attendance: 31,979; Referee: Roger Raharison (Madagascar)

6 June 1999 2000 African Cup of Nations qualification	Gabon	3–1	Angola	Stade Omar Bongo, Libreville
	Nguema 17', 40'; Amégasse 80'		Valente 81'	Referee: Ibrahim Djingarey (Niger)

20 June 1999 2000 African Cup of Nations qualification	Angola	2–2	South Africa	Estádio da Cidadela, Luanda
	Zito 70'; Jaburú 74'		Mkhalele 32', 48'	Attendance: 25,000; Referee: Said Belqola (Morocco)
