= Kigezi HomeBoyz FC =

Association football club in Uganda

Kigezi HomeBoyz
- Full name: Kigezi HomeBoyz FC
- Nickname: The Gorillas
- Founded: 2012; 14 years ago
- Stadium: Kabale Municipal Stadium
- Manager: Joseph Harold Mutyaba
- League: Uganda Premier League
- Website: https://kigezihomeboyz.com/

Kigezi HomeBoyz FC also known as The Gorillas is a football club based in Kampala, Uganda, that competes in the Uganda Premier League.

== Overview ==
Kigezi HomeBoyz Football Club was formed in 2012 as Kabale Sharp FC before being rebranded to Kigezi HomeBoyz FC in 2019. The club is a professional football team based in Kabale District, southwestern Uganda. The team was promoted to the FUFA Big League in the 2016/2017 season after winning the western regional playoff and it competes in the Uganda Premier League following its promotion for the 2026–27 season.

The club plays its home matches at Kabale Municipal Stadium.

== Club legal owners ==
Kigezi HomeBoyz Football Club is legally owned by Kigezi HomeBoyz Company Limited.

== Patrons ==
- Eng. Bwambale Joram Marco

== Board of Trustees ==
Davis Muhangi is the Chairman of Kigezi HomeBoyz FC, and Brian Zatwoshaho is the chief executive officer.

== Head coaches ==
- Ian Mugisha (2012–2016)
- Vialli Bainomugisha (2018–July 2019)
- Stephen Geoffrey Pritchard (July–October 2019)
- Vialli Bainomugisha (November 2019–October 2020)
- Mark Twinamatsiko (October 2020–May 2021)
- Denis Tushabe May 2021 (interim)
- Stephen Geoffrey Pritchard (January-August 2025)
- Sempigi Sadick (August 2025–June 2026)
- Joseph Harold Mutyaba (June 2026-Present)

== See also ==
KCCA FC

SC Villa FC
