= Mahmoud Aboul-Dahab =

Egyptian footballer (born 1970)

Personal information
- Full name: Mahmoud Aboul-Dahab
- Date of birth: February 23, 1970 (age 56)
- Place of birth: Cairo, Egypt
- Height: 1.86 m (6 ft 1 in)
- Position: Defender

Youth career
- Zamalek

Senior career*
Years	Team	Apps	(Gls)
1990–1993	Al-Merreikh		
1993–1997	Al-Ahly		
1997–1998	FC Tirol Innsbruck		
1998–2001	El-Masry		
2002–2004	Goldi		
2004–2005	Tersana		
2005–2006	Baladeyet El-Mahalla		

International career
1994–1999	Egypt	12	(4)
- * Club domestic league appearances and goals

Mahmoud Aboul-Dahab (Arabic محمود أبو الدهب); (born February 23, 1970), is a former Egyptian footballer he played as a defender.

== International career ==
Aboul-Dahab made several appearances for Egypt national football team, including 1996 African Cup of Nations qualification where he scored 4 goals despite being a defender. Later, he missed the 1996 African Cup of Nations due to injury. Aboul-Dahab played his last international game in November 1999 against Ghana under Gérard Gili.

=== International Goals ===
Scores and results list Egypt's goal tally first.

#	Date	Venue	Opponent	Score	Result	Competition
1.	7 April 1995	Alexandria Stadium, Alexandria, Egypt	Sudan	1–0	3–1	1996 African Cup of Nations qualification
2.	22 April 1995	National Stadium, Dar es Salaam, Tanzania	Tanzania	1–0	2–1	1996 African Cup of Nations qualification
3.	22 April 1995	National Stadium, Dar es Salaam, Tanzania	Tanzania	2–0	2–1	1996 African Cup of Nations qualification
4.	4 June 1995	Addis Ababa Stadium, Addis Ababa, Ethiopia	Ethiopia	1–0	2–0	1996 African Cup of Nations qualification

== Titles and honours ==
Al Ahly

- Egyptian League (3): 1994–1995, 1995–1996, 1996–1997
- Egypt Cup (1): 1995–1996
