= Semedo =

Semedo is a Portuguese surname. Notable people with the surname include:

- Álvaro Semedo (1586–1658 or 1659), Portuguese Jesuit, Vice-Provincial of Jesuit China Mission in south China during the Ming/Qing changeover
- António Semedo, former Portuguese football forward
- Cafú (footballer, born 1977), real name Arlindo Gomes Semedo, Cape Verdean football forward
- Cícero Semedo, Guinea-Bissauan football forward
- Curvo Semedo, Portuguese poet
- Gil Semedo, Cape Verdean singer
- José Filipe Correia Semedo, Cape Verdean football forward
- José Orlando Semedo, former Portuguese football midfielder
- José Vítor Moreira Semedo, Portuguese football defender
- Leandro Semedo, Cape Verdean handball player
- Nélson Cabral Semedo, Portuguese football right-back
- Maria Helena Semedo
- Rúben Semedo, Portuguese football defender
- Willy Semedo, Cape Verdean football midfielder
- Yannick Semedo, Cape Verdean football midfielder

== See also ==
- Semedo (chess)
