= Túbia Ribeiro =

Angolan footballer

Personal information
- Full name: João Paulo Arsénio Ribeiro
- Date of birth: 15 August 1966 (age 60)
- Place of birth: Luanda, Angola

Senior career*
Years	Team	Apps	(Gls)
1985-1991	Interclube	20	(20)
1991	Boavista		
1991-1998	C.D. Aves	182	(32)
1997-1998	União de Leiria	30	(3)
1998-1999	S.C. Espinho	20	(2)
1999-2000	C.D. Feirense	8	(3)
2000-2001	Sporting de Covilhã	33	(6)
2001-2004	Milheiroense		

International career
1987–2000	Angola	26	(2)
- * Club domestic league appearances and goals

Túbia Ribeiro (born 15 August 1966) is an Angolan footballer. He played in 26 matches for the Angola national football team from 1987 and 2000. He was also named in Angola's squad for the 1996 African Cup of Nations tournament.

== International career ==
Túbia made his debut on February 1, 1987, in a victory for Angola in the preliminary rounds for 1988 African Cup of Nations against Gabon at the Coqueiros stadium. Angola advanced in these qualifiers but was eliminated in the next phase. His first goal came after a 5-years hiatus from playing for the national team (from 1989 to 1994), in the qualifiers for the 1996 AFCON against Namibia at the Cidadela stadium. Angola qualified for the AFCON for the first time, and Túbia played in all three games (Angola was eliminated in the group stage), receiving a yellow card in the first game against Egypt. His last game was in 2000 COSAFA Cup against Malawi, where Angola won on penalties.

Appearances and goals by national team and years
National team	Years	Apps	Goals
Angola	1987	2	0
Angola	1988	1	0
Angola	1989	1	0
Angola	1990-1993	0	0
Angola	1994	3	1
Angola	1995	6	1
Angola	1996	6	0
Angola	1997-1999	0	0
Angola	2000	3	0
Total		26	2

Score and results list Angola goal tally first, score column indicates score after each Túbia Ribeiro goal.

List of international goals scored by Túbia Ribeiro
No.	Date	Venue	Cap	Opponent	Score	Result	Competition
1	4 September 1994	Estádio da Cidadela, Luanda, Angola	5	Namibia	1-0	2-0	1996 Africa Cup of Nations qualification
2	8 January 1995	Estádio da Cidadela, Luanda, Angola	8	Mozambique	1-0	1-0	1996 Africa Cup of Nations qualification

== Titles ==
União de Leiria

- Liga Portugal 2 (1): 1997-98
