= Vincent Mutale =

Zambian footballer (born 1973)

Personal information
- Date of birth: 28 April 1973 (age 53)
- Place of birth: Mufulira, Zambia
- Position: Midfielder

International career
Years	Team	Apps	(Gls)
1995–1997	Zambia	28	(3)

Vincent Mutale (born 28 April 1973) is a Zambian footballer. He played in 28 matches for the Zambia national football team from 1995 to 1997. He was also named in Zambia's squad for the 1996 African Cup of Nations tournament.
