= Phillip Obwiny =

Ugandan footballer and coach (1974)

Personal information
- Full name: Phillip Obwiny
- Date of birth: 1974 (age 51–52)
- Place of birth: Jinja, Uganda
- Position: Defender

Senior career*
Years	Team	Apps	(Gls)
1991–1992	Owino Hot Stars FC		
1992–1996	Express FC		
1996–1998	SC Villa		
1998–2000	Express FC		
2001–2004	SC Villa		
2005–2008	Uganda Revenue Authority FC		
2008–2009	Nalubaale FC		
2010	Express FC		

International career
1994–2004	Uganda Uganda		

Managerial career
- 2016–2017: Bulemeezi Ssaza FC
- * Club domestic league appearances and goals

Phillip Obwiny, also known as Phillo, Philip Obwin, Capi, and Bollie (born 1974), is a former Ugandan footballer who played as a defender and later became a coach.

== Early life and education background ==
Obwiny was born in 1974 in Jinja to late Sebastian Emojong and Teopista Nyabur. He attended Green Valley and Shimoni for primary education and from there he joined Old Kampala SS for O-level before he went to Kibuli SS for A-level.

== Playing career ==
Obwiny started his football career at Owino FC in the late 1980s before joining Express FC in 1992. In 1996, he moved to SC Villa and later returned to Express FC in 1998 before rejoining SC Villa in 2002.

In 2004, he joined Uganda Revenue Authority FC and later moved to Nalubaale FC in 2007. He returned to Express FC before retiring from professional football in 2010.

Obwiny also played for Uganda Cranes in 1994 against Ethiopia and represented the national team until 2000. During his international career, he became Uganda's captain and was part of the team that won the 1996 CECAFA Senior Challenge Cup.

== Coaching career ==
After retiring from football in 2010, Obwiny moved into coaching and football administration. In 2015, he was appointed as the technical director of SC Villa and later served on the club's technical bench. In 2016, he became head coach of Bulemeezi Ssaza FC in the Buganda Masaza Cup, a role he held until 2017.

== Achievements ==
Obwiny won

- the Uganda Cup in 1992, the Uganda League title in 1993, and achieved the Uganda League and Uganda Cup double in 1995. He also won the Hedex Cup in 1995 with Express FC.
- Uganda Premier League titles in 2001, 2002, 2003 and 2004, the Uganda Cup in 2002, and the CECAFA Kagame Club Championship in 2003. with SC Villa
- CECAFA Senior Challenge Cup with Uganda Cranes in 1996 and 2000.
- the Golden Boot at the 1996 CECAFA Senior Challenge Cup

== See also ==
- Joseph Harold Mutyaba
- Jackson Mayanja
