= John Sama =

Sierra Leonean footballer

Personal information
- Date of birth: 24 March 1972 (age 54)
- Position: Midfielder

Senior career*
Years	Team	Apps	(Gls)
1995–1996	Visby IF Gute		
1997	Degerfors IF	5	(0)

International career
1993–1997	Sierra Leone		
- * Club domestic league appearances and goals

John Sama (born 24 March 1972) is a retired Sierra Leonean football midfielder. He was a squad member for the 1994 and 1996 African Cup of Nations.
