= Gbassay Sessay =

Sierra Leonean footballer (born 1968)

Gbassay Sesay
Personal information
- Full name: John Gbassay Sessay
- Date of birth: 11 May 1968 (age 58)
- Place of birth: Batkanu, Sierra Leone
- Position: Forward

Senior career*
Years	Team	Apps	(Gls)
1988–1989	Estrela da Amadora	8	(1)
1989–1990	Sporting Covilhã	33	(9)
1990–1991	Amora	29	(0)
1991–1992	Benfica e Castelo Branco	33	(10)
1992–1994	Vitória Setúbal	53	(1)
1994–1995	Paços de Ferreira	25	(0)
1995–1996	Sporting Covilhã	26	(0)

International career
1994–1996	Sierra Leone	17	(5)
- * Club domestic league appearances and goals

John Gbassay Sessay (born 11 May 1968) is a retired Sierra Leonean international footballer who played as a striker.

== Career ==
Sessay played in the Portuguese Liga for Estrela da Amadora and Vitória Setúbal.

Sessay was a member of the Sierra Leone national football team (the 'Leone Stars') squad at the 1994 African Nations Cup in Tunisia and the 1996 African Nations Cup in South Africa. He scored one of Sierra Leone's two goals as the Leone Stars defeated Burkina Faso in their opening match of the 1996 African Nations Cup.
