= Boureima Zongo =

Burkinabé footballer (born 1972)

Personal information
- Date of birth: 16 March 1972 (age 54)
- Place of birth: Republic of Upper Volta
- Position: Attacking midfielder

Senior career*
Years	Team	Apps	(Gls)
- RC Bobo Dioulasso

International career
1993–2001	Burkina Faso	34	(5)
- * Club domestic league appearances and goals

Boureima Zongo (born 16 March 1972) is a Burkinabé former footballer who played as an attacking midfielder. He played in 25 matches for the Burkina Faso national team from 1992 to 2001. He was also named in Burkina Faso's squad for the 1998 African Cup of Nations tournament.
