= Joni (footballer) =

Angolan footballer (born 1970)

Personal information
- Full name: Osvaldo Roque Gonçalves da Cruz
- Date of birth: March 25, 1970 (age 56)
- Place of birth: Luanda, Portuguese Angola
- Position: Midfielder

Youth career
- 1985–1988: Oliveira de Frades

Senior career*
Years	Team	Apps	(Gls)
1988–1992	Oliveira de Frades		
1992–1993	Tondela		
1993–1997	Salgueiros	52	(4)
1997–1998	Académico Viseu	27	(0)
1998–1999	União Montemor	14	(2)
1999–2002	ASA		
2002	Olhanense	16	(3)
2002–2003	Al Ahli		
2003	Sagrada Esperança		
2004	Benfica Luanda		
2005	Primeiro de Maio		
2006	Petro de Luanda		

International career
1994–2001	Angola	46	(5)
- * Club domestic league appearances and goals

Osvaldo Roque Gonçalves da Cruz (born March 25, 1970, in Luanda), nicknamed Joni, is an Angolan retired football midfielder.

== International career ==
Joni has been a member of his national team, and was called up to the 1996 African Cup of Nations.

== National team statistics ==
Angola national team
Year	Apps	Goals
1994	1	0
1995	7	2
1996	5	1
1997	4	0
1998	1	0
1999	7	0
2000	9	1
2001	10	1
Total	44	5

=== International goals ===
Scores and results list Angola's goal tally first.

No	Date	Venue	Opponent	Score	Result	Competition
1.	30 July 1995	Estádio da Cidadela, Luanda, Angola	Botswana	1–0	4–0	1996 Africa Cup of Nations qualification
2.	30 July 1995	Estádio da Cidadela, Luanda, Angola	Botswana	2–0	4–0	1996 Africa Cup of Nations qualification
3.	24 January 1996	Kings Park Stadium, Durban, South Africa	Cameroon	1–1	3–3	1996 Africa Cup of Nations
4.	23 April 2000	Estádio da Cidadela, Luanda, Angola	Swaziland	2–0	7–1	2002 FIFA World Cup qualification
5.	1 June 2001	May 19, 1956 Stadium, Annaba, Algeria	Algeria	2–2	2–3	2002 Africa Cup of Nations qualification
