= Quinzinho =

Angolan footballer (1974–2019)

Personal information
- Full name: Joaquim Alberto da Silva
- Date of birth: 4 March 1974
- Place of birth: Luanda, Angola
- Date of death: 15 April 2019 (aged 45)
- Place of death: Alverca do Ribatejo, Portugal
- Height: 1.82 m (6 ft 0 in)
- Position: Striker

Senior career*
Years	Team	Apps	(Gls)
1994–1995	ASA		
1995–2001	Porto	21	(6)
1996–1997	→ União Leiria (loan)	18	(3)
1997–1998	→ Rio Ave (loan)	24	(8)
1999	→ Rayo Vallecano (loan)	1	(0)
2000	→ Farense (loan)	6	(1)
2000–2001	→ Aves (loan)	24	(5)
2001–2002	Alverca	30	(5)
2002–2003	Estoril	13	(7)
2003–2004	Guangzhou Xiangxue	47	(17)
2005–2007	Xiamen Blue Lions	66	(20)
2008–2009	Wuxi Zobon	23	(4)
2009–2010	Caála		
2011–2012	ASA		
Total		273+	(76+)

International career
1994–2001	Angola	40	(9)
- * Club domestic league appearances and goals

Joaquim Alberto da Silva (4 March 1974 – 15 April 2019), known as Quinzinho, was an Angolan professional footballer who played as a striker.

He spent the vast majority of his career in Portugal and China, amassing Primeira Liga totals of 123 matches and 28 goals over seven seasons in the former country. He also competed in Spain.

Quinzinho appeared for Angola in two Africa Cup of Nations tournaments.

== Club career ==
Born in Luanda, Portuguese Angola, Quinzinho signed with Porto in 1995 from local club ASA. He was sparingly played during his spell at the former club as he was behind Domingos Paciência first and later Mário Jardel, and was also loaned to fellow Primeira Liga sides União de Leiria and Rio Ave.

After a period in Spain with Rayo Vallecano, Quinzinho returned to Portugal where, although still registered with Porto, he represented Farense, Aves and Alverca in quick succession, always in the top division. In January 2003, after half a season with Estoril in the lower leagues, he moved to China where he stayed for five years, appearing for teams in both the Super League and League One.

== International career ==
Quinzinho earned 40 caps for Angola in seven years and two months. He made his debut on 4 September 1994, in a 2–0 home win against Namibia for the 1996 African Cup of Nations qualifiers.

Quinzinho was picked for the squad at the 1996 and 1998 African Cup of Nations, scoring a combined three goals as both tournaments ended in group stage elimination.

== Personal life and death ==
Quinzinho's son, Alexandre, is also a footballer. Born in Portugal, he played for them at youth level.

On 15 April 2019 Quinzinho, at the time working for U.D. Vilafranquense as a physiotherapist, suffered a heart attack after jogging in Alverca do Ribatejo and died shortly after, at the age of 45. He was buried in Lisbon.

== Career statistics ==
Scores and results list Angola's goal tally first, score column indicates score after each Quinzinho goal.

List of international goals scored by Quinzinho
No.	Date	Venue	Opponent	Score	Result	Competition
1	8 April 1995	Independence Stadium, Windhoek, Namibia	Namibia	2–2	2–2	1996 Africa Cup of Nations qualification
2	15 January 1996	FNB Stadium, Johannesburg, South Africa	Egypt	1–2	1–2	1996 Africa Cup of Nations
3	24 January 1996	Kings Park Stadium, Durban, South Africa	Cameroon	3–2	3–3	1996 Africa Cup of Nations
4	17 August 1997	Stade Municipal, Lomé, Togo	Togo	1–0	1–1	1998 World Cup qualification
5	16 February 1998	Stade Municipal, Ouagadougou, Burkina Faso	Ivory Coast	2–3	2–5	1998 Africa Cup of Nations
6	25 March 2001	Estádio da Cidadela, Luanda, Angola	Burkina Faso	1–0	2–0	2002 Africa Cup of Nations qualification
7	6 May 2001	Estádio da Cidadela, Luanda, Angola	Cameroon	2–0	2–0	2002 World Cup qualification
8	1 June 2001	May 19, 1956 Stadium, Annaba, Algeria	Algeria	1–1	2–3	2002 Africa Cup of Nations qualification
9	10 June 2001	Estádio da Cidadela, Luanda, Angola	Mauritius	1–0	1–0	2001 COSAFA Cup

== Honours ==
Porto

- Primeira Liga: 1995–96, 1998–99

Xiamen Lanshi

- China League One: 2005
