= Brahim Ould Malha =

Mauritanian footballer

Personal information
- Date of birth: 30 November 1976 (age 49)
- Place of birth: Mauritania
- Position: Striker

Senior career*
Years	Team	Apps	(Gls)
1994–2006	AS Garde Nationale		
2006–2008	ACS Ksar		

International career
1994–2002	Mauritania	23	(5)
- * Club domestic league appearances and goals

Brahim Ould Malha (Arabic: ابراهيم ولد مالحة; born 30 November 1976) is a Mauritanian former professional footballer who played as a striker. He scored five goals and made twenty-three appearances for the Mauritania national team.

== Honours ==
AS Garde Nationale

- Ligue 1 Mauritania: 1998
- Mauritanian President's Cup: 2001
