= Paulão (footballer, born 1969) =

Angolan footballer (1969–2021)

Personal information
- Full name: Paulo António Alves
- Date of birth: 22 October 1969
- Place of birth: Luanda, Portuguese Angola
- Date of death: 17 August 2021 (aged 51)
- Place of death: Luanda, Angola
- Height: 1.84 m (6 ft 0 in)
- Position: Midfielder

Senior career*
| Years | Team | Apps | (Gls) |
| 1993–1994 | Primeiro de Maio | | |
| 1994–1995 | Vitória Setúbal | 19 | (1) |
| 1995–1997 | Benfica | 23 | (3) |
| 1997–1998 | Académica | 13 | (0) |
| 1998–2002 | Espinho | 92 | (21) |
| 2002 | Petro Atlético | | |
| 2003–2004 | ASA | | |
| Total | | 147 | (25) |

International career
| 1993–2001 | Angola | 52 | (19) |
- * Club domestic league appearances and goals

Paulo António Alves (22 October 1969 – 17 August 2021), commonly known as Paulão, was an Angolan professional footballer who played as a midfielder.

== Club career ==
Born in Luanda, Paulão arrived in Portugal in 1994, where he would spend the following eight years of his career, joining Vitória F.C. from Estrela Clube Primeiro de Maio. After one season he signed for Primeira Liga club S.L. Benfica, appearing in 18 games in his first year and scoring three goals as the team finished second 11 points behind FC Porto.

Paulão was only a fringe player in his second season with Benfica, playing in only seven official matches. He then left for fellow top-division side Académica de Coimbra, where he was also featured sparingly.

Subsequently, Paulão spent four years in the second division with S.C. Espinho, after which he returned to his homeland to play with Atlético Petróleos Luanda and Atlético Sport Aviação, retiring in 2004 at the age of nearly 35.

== International career ==
Paulão played for Angola for eight years, his debut coming in 1993. He was a member of the squad that appeared at the 1996 African Cup of Nations in South Africa, netting in a 3–3 draw against Cameroon in an eventual group stage exit.

During his tenure with the national team, Paulão appeared in eight FIFA World Cup qualification games, winning five of those. Additionally, he also played at the Europe XI v Africa XI friendly game in 1997.

== Death ==
Paulão died on 17 August 2021 in Luanda, at the age of 51.

== Career statistics ==
Scores and results list Angola's goal tally first, score column indicates score after each goal.

List of international goals scored by Paulao
| No. | Date | Venue | Opponent | Score | Result | Competition |
|---|---|---|---|---|---|---|
| 1 | 28 February 1993 | Stade de Kégué, Lomé, Togo | Togo | 1–0 | 1–0 | 1994 World Cup qualification |
| 2 | 22 January 1995 | Botswana National Stadium, Gaborone, Botswana | Botswana | 1–1 | 2–1 | 1996 Africa Cup of Nations qualification |
| 3 | 22 January 1995 | Botswana National Stadium, Gaborone, Botswana | Botswana | 2–1 | 2–1 | 1996 Africa Cup of Nations qualification |
| 4 | 8 April 1995 | Independence, Windhoek, Namibia | Namibia | 1–0 | 2–2 | 1996 Africa Cup of Nations qualification |
| 5 | 23 April 1995 | Estádio da Cidadela, Luanda, Angola | Guinea | 2–0 | 3–0 | 1996 Africa Cup of Nations qualification |
| 6 | 16 July 1995 | Estádio da Machava, Maputo, Mozambique | Mozambique | 1–2 | 1–2 | 1996 Africa Cup of Nations qualification |
| 7 | 30 July 1995 | Estádio da Cidadela, Luanda, Angola | Botswana | 4–0 | 4–0 | 1996 Africa Cup of Nations qualification |
| 8 | 24 January 1996 | Kings Park Stadium, Durban, South Africa | Cameroon | 2–1 | 3–3 | 1996 Africa Cup of Nations |
| 9 | 1 June 1996 | Nakivubo Stadium, Kampala, Uganda | Uganda | 2–0 | 2–0 | 1998 World Cup qualification |
| 10 | 16 June 1996 | Estádio da Cidadela, Luanda, Angola | Uganda | 1–0 | 3–1 | 1998 World Cup qualification |
| 11 | 16 June 1996 | Estádio da Cidadela, Luanda, Angola | Uganda | 3–1 | 3–1 | 1998 World Cup qualification |
| 12 | 6 October 1996 | Accra Sports Stadium, Accra, Ghana | Ghana | 1–0 | 1–2 | 1998 Africa Cup of Nations qualification |
| 13 | 10 November 1996 | Estádio da Cidadela, Luanda, Angola | Zimbabwe | 2–1 | 2–1 | 1998 World Cup qualification |
| 14 | 30 March 1997 | Estádio da Machava, Maputo, Mozambique | Mozambique | ?–? | 2–1 | Friendly |
| 15 | 6 April 1997 | Estádio da Cidadela, Luanda, Angola | Togo | 1–1 | 3–1 | 1998 World Cup qualification |
| 16 | 23 April 2000 | Estádio da Cidadela, Luanda, Angola | Swaziland | 3–0 | 7–1 | 2002 World Cup qualification |
| 17 | 23 April 2000 | Estádio da Cidadela, Luanda, Angola | Swaziland | 5–0 | 7–1 | 2002 World Cup qualification |
| 18 | 16 July 2000 | Estádio da Cidadela, Luanda, Angola | Equatorial Guinea | 1–0 | 4–1 | 2002 Africa Cup of Nations qualification |
| 19 | 17 June 2001 | Cabinda, Angola | Burundi | 1–0 | 2–1 | 2002 Africa Cup of Nations qualification |
