= Haytham Farouk =

Egyptian footballer (born 1971)

Personal information
- Full name: Haytham Farouk Aboelw
- Date of birth: 4 January 1971 (age 55)
- Place of birth: Alexandria, Egypt
- Height: 1.86 m (6 ft 1 in)
- Position: Defender

Senior career*
Years	Team	Apps	(Gls)
1988–1996	Olympic Club	220	(22)
1996–1997	Feyenoord	4	(0)
1997–1998	Helsingborgs IF	8	(0)
1998–1999	Oostende	10	(0)
1999–2002	Zamalek SC	48	(3)
2002–2003	Ismaily	8	(0)
2003–2005	El-Tersana	28	(10)
2005–2006	El-Masry	14	(0)

International career
1987	Egypt U17	8	(2)
1989	Egypt U 19	6	
1990-1992	Olympic U23	25	(4)
1993–1999	Egypt	13	(1)
- * Club domestic league appearances and goals

Haytham Farouk Aboelw (Arabic: هيثم فاروق; born 4 January 1971) is an Egyptian former professional footballer who played as a defender.

Farouk was born in Alexandria. He spent most of his career in Egypt and played for El-Olympi and Zamalek SC. He played for the Zamalek side that won the 2000 African Cup Winners' Cup, Egyptian league 2000-2001 and Egyptian Super Cup 2001. Individual achievements: Farouk played for Olympic club when he was 17 years old which was considered the youngest player to ever play for the first team. He was also the first Egyptian player to ever play in the Dutch league, that occurred in 1996 with Feyenoord, Rotterdam. Also the first Egyptian player who played in the Swedish league in Helsingborgs 1997, and Belgian league aside Nader Elsayed in 1998. Aside long Farouk incredible achievements he was also the fifth Egyptian player in history that played in UEFA cup. Haytham Farouk currently is one of the most famous sport analysts working in Bein Sports. Bein sports is known worldwide for being the most important and famous sport channel. He also had a spell in Europe, playing for Dutch Eredivisie side Feyenoord, Swedish Allsvenskan side Helsingborgs IF and Belgian First Division side K.V. Oostende.

Farouk made several appearances for the Egypt national football team, including 1998 FIFA World Cup qualifying matches. He also played for Egypt at the 1992 Summer Olympics in Barcelona.
