= Valéry Ondo =

Gabonese footballer

Personal information
- Date of birth: 14 August 1967 (age 59)

International career
Years	Team	Apps	(Gls)
1992–2001	Gabon	36	(12)

Valéry Ondo (born 14 August 1967) is a Gabonese footballer. He played in 36 matches for the Gabon national football team from 1992 to 2001. He was also named in Gabon's squad for the 1994 African Cup of Nations tournament.
