= Aurélien Bekogo =

Gabonese footballer

Personal information
- Full name: Aurélien Bekogo Zolo
- Date of birth: 27 December 1975 (age 50)
- Place of birth: Libreville, Gabon
- Position: Forward

International career
| Years | Team | Apps | (Gls) |
| 1994–2000 | Gabon | 26 | (6) |

Aurélien Bekogo Zolo (born 27 December 1975) is a Gabonese footballer who played as a forward. He made 26 appearances for the Gabon national football team from 1994 to 2000. He was also named in Gabon's squad for the 1996 African Cup of Nations tournament.
