= Lekoane Lekoane =

Mosotho footballer (born 1969)

Personal information
- Date of birth: 6 March 1969 (age 57)
- Place of birth: Lesotho
- Position: Striker

Senior career*
Years	Team	Apps	(Gls)
1986–1988	Arsenal (Maseru)		
-1995	Majantja		
1995–1997	Kaizer Chiefs		
1997–1999	Dynamos		
1999–2000	Arcadia Shepherds		

International career
1994–1997	Lesotho	6	(2)
- * Club domestic league appearances and goals

Lekoane Lekoane (born 6 March 1969) is a Mosotho retired footballer who is last known to have played as a striker for Arcadia Shepherds.

== Career ==
In 1995, Lekoane signed for South African top flight side Kaizer Chiefs, where he said, "Playing for Chiefs was no easy for me, some of my teammates did not like me and they made life real difficult from the first day I joined the club. But I told myself I was there to play football and shine." In 1997, he signed for Dynamos in the South African second division, helping them earn promotion to the South African top flight but left due to injury. In 2000, Lekoane retired after being shot by thieves.
