= Samuel Kargbo =

Gambian footballer

Personal information
- Full name: Samuel Kargbo
- Date of birth: April 13, 1974 (age 52)
- Place of birth: Banjul, Gambia
- Position: Midfielder

Senior career*
Years	Team	Apps	(Gls)
2000–2001	Steve Biko		

International career
1995–1996	Gambia		
- * Club domestic league appearances and goals

Samuel Kargbo (born 13 April 1974) is a former Gambian international footballer.

== Career ==
Born in the Gambia, Kargbo played club football in the local league. He played for Steve Biko F.C., helping the club win its first Gambian Cup in 2000.

Kargbo made several appearances for the Gambia national football team, including the 1995 Amílcar Cabral Cup in Mauritania and 1998 FIFA World Cup qualifying rounds.

=== International goals ===
Scores and results list Gambia's goal tally first.

No	Date	Venue	Opponent	Score	Result	Competition
1.	21 November 1995	Stade Olympique, Nouakchott, Mauritania	Cape Verde	2–0	3–0	1995 Amilcar Cabral Cup
2.	19 May 1996	Independence Stadium, Bakau, Gambia	Guinea	1–0	1–1	Friendly
