= Álvaro Semedo =

Jesuit missionary in China

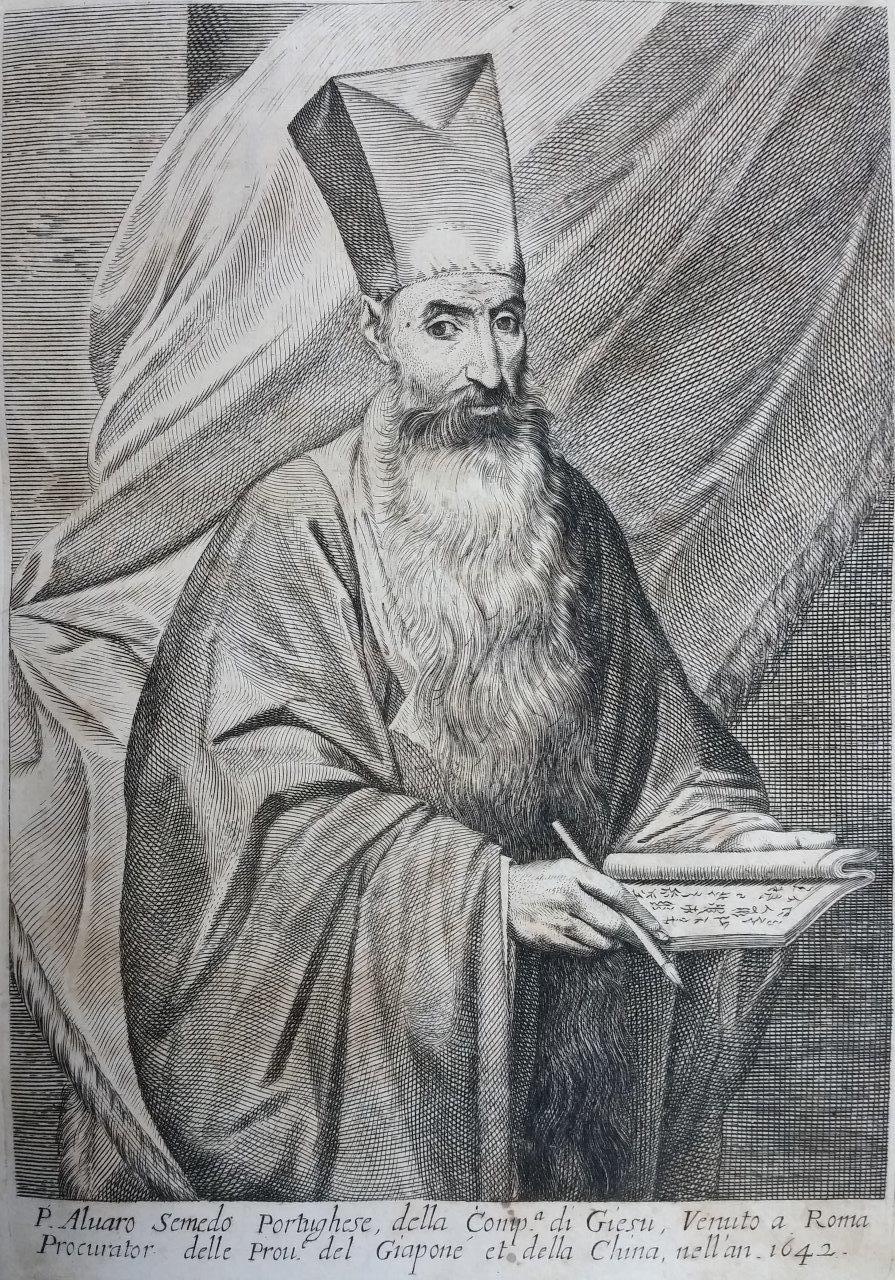
- 1642 depiction of Álvaro de Semedo (from Historica Relatione del Gran Regno Della Cina published 1653)
- Born: 1585 or 1586; Nisa, Portugal
- Died: 18 July 1658; Guangzhou, China
- Occupation: Jesuit missionry

Álvaro de Semedo (Latinized form: Alvarus de Semedo; Chinese: 曾德昭, Zeng Dezhao, earlier 謝務祿 Xie Wulu) (1585 or 1586 – 18 July 1658), was a Portuguese Jesuit priest and missionary in China.

== Life ==
Álvaro Semedo was born in Nisa, Portugal in 1585 or 1586. He entered the Jesuit novitiate in 1602, and on 29 March 1608, he left for Goa and the Far East aboard Nossa Sra. do Vencimento. He arrived in Macau in 1610, and Nanjing in 1613. Along with another Jesuit, Alfonso Vagnoni, he was imprisoned during an anti-Christian campaign in Nanjing in 1616, and then sent back to Macau, where he stayed until 1621.

As the persecution campaign in the mainland China abated, Fr. Semedo changed his Chinese name from Xie Wulu to Zeng Dezhao and re-entered China, now working in Jiangsu and Jiangnan provinces. He spent most of his term in China in the central and southern provinces; perhaps his only trip north was the one he made to Xi'an in 1625, during which he was the first European to see the recently unearthed Nestorian Stele.

In 1636, Semedo went back to Europe as a procurator, sent by his Order to recruit people for the China mission and to ensure continued assistance from the church in Europe. During his sojourn in Europe, he wrote a long report on China, which was translated from Portuguese and published in Spanish, in 1642, under the title Imperio de la China.

After his return to China, Semedo served in Guangzhou (Canton) as the Vice-Provincial of the Jesuit China Mission. During several years after the fall of Beijing to the Manchus in 1644, he continued to work with the Ming loyalist regimes in the Southern China (notably, sending Michał Boym to the court of the Southern Ming Yongli Emperor), even as most Jesuits elsewhere in China were switching their loyalty to the recently established Qing dynasty. Once the Qing took Canton, Semedo was detained, but was freed a few months later, reportedly due to the interference of Beijing-based Johann Adam Schall von Bell. He spent the rest of his life in Guangzhou, where he died.

== Works by Álvaro Semedo online ==
- The history of that great and renowned monarchy of China. Wherein all the particular provinces are accurately described: as also the dispositions, manners, learning, lawes, militia, government, and religion of the people. Together with the traffick and commodities of that countrey (English translation, 1655)

== See also ==
- Semedo (chess)

== Literature ==
- L. Carrington Goodrich & Chao-Ying Fang (red.): Dictionary of Ming Biography, 2 bd., New York/London: Columbia University Press 1976
