= Semedo (chess) =

Chess variant

	a	b	c	d	e
8	a8 black knight	b8 black queen	c8 black king	d8 black queen	e8 black knight	8
7	a7 M d	b7 black pawn	c7 black pawn	d7 black pawn	e7 M d	7
6	a6 black pawn	b6	c6	d6	e6 black pawn	6
5	a5	b5	c5	d5	e5	5
4	a4	b4	c4	d4	e4	4
3	a3 white pawn	b3	c3	d3	e3 white pawn	3
2	a2 M l	b2 white pawn	c2 white pawn	d2 white pawn	e2 M l	2
1	a1 white knight	b1 white queen	c1 white king	d1 white queen	e1 white knight	1
	a	b	c	d	e

Semedo starting position

represents the scientists
represents the rockets

Semedo (Latin: Semedo) is a variant of chess, presumably invented by Álvaro Semedo.

== Description ==
Some chess historians dispute the existence of such chess in general. Supposedly invented by a Jesuit missionary in China, Álvaro Semedo. Subsequently, other Catholic missionaries in China reported a special Chinese chess called "semedo". A description of this game in Latin is given in a book published in 1694 in England.

=== Rules ===
The rules of Semedo are not described well in Mandragorias by Thomas Hyde which is the primary source for Semedo. The moves of the pawn, knight and scientists are not described but presumably the pawn moves like a pawn in western chess without the double-step option on the first move, the knight might either moves like the knight in western chess or like the Horse in Xiangqi and the scientists may be similar to the Advisor in Xiangqi. The rocket's movement is described, but poorly, but it might move like the cannon in Xiangqi. The king is described as not being able to attack, this may mean that the king cannot move and is trapped in its starting position but also that it simply cannot capture any pieces.
