= Castella (footballer) =

Angolan footballer

Martinho Joaquim Castella Quessongo
Personal information
- Date of birth: 7 February 1970 (age 56)
- Place of birth: Benguela, Angola

International career
Years	Team	Apps	(Gls)
1994–1997	Angola	20	(1)

Martinho Joaquim Castella Quessongo (born 7 February 1970) is an Angolan footballer. He played in 20 matches for the Angola national football team from 1994 and 1997. He was also named in Angola's squad for the 1996 African Cup of Nations tournament.
