= Aboubakari Ouédraogo =

Burkinabé footballer

Personal information
- Date of birth: 23 June 1970 (age 56)

International career
Years	Team	Apps	(Gls)
1994–1996	Burkina Faso	10	(3)

Aboubakari Ouédraogo (born 23 June 1970) is a Burkinabé footballer. He played in ten matches for the Burkina Faso national football team from 1994 to 1996. He was also named in Burkina Faso's squad for the 1996 African Cup of Nations tournament.
