= Emanuel Matola =

Mozambican footballer

Personal information
- Full name: Emanuel Fernando Matola
- Date of birth: 11 September 1967 (age 59)
- Height: 1.73 m (5 ft 8 in)
- Position: Midfielder

Senior career*
Years	Team	Apps	(Gls)
- Matchedje
- Costa do Sol

International career
1992–1999	Mozambique	66	(5)
- * Club domestic league appearances and goals

Emanuel Fernando Matola (born 11 September 1967), commonly known as Nana, is a Mozambican former footballer who played as a midfielder. He played in 66 matches and scored five goals for the Mozambique national team from 1988 to 1999. He was named in Mozambique's squad for the 1998 African Cup of Nations tournament.
