= Sérgio Faife =

Mozambican footballer

Personal information
- Full name: Sérgio Faife Matsolo
- Date of birth: 26 April 1970 (age 56)
- Place of birth: Maputo, Mozambique
- Position: Defender

Senior career*
| Years | Team | Apps | (Gls) |
- Desportivo Maputo
- Costa do Sol
- Ferroviário Maputo
- Ferroviário Nampula
- Ferroviário Maputo

International career
| 1993–2008 | Mozambique | 55 | (4) |
- * Club domestic league appearances and goals

Sérgio Faife Matsolo (born 26 April 1970) is a Mozambican former footballer who played as a defender. He made 55 appearances for the Mozambique national team from 1993 to 2008. He was also named in Mozambique's squad for the 1998 African Cup of Nations tournament.
