= Dennis Lota =

Zambian footballer (1973-2014)

Personal information
- Date of birth: 8 November 1973
- Place of birth: Kitwe, Zambia
- Date of death: 4 February 2014 (aged 40)
- Place of death: Johannesburg, South Africa
- Height: 1.75 m (5 ft 9 in)
- Position: Striker

Senior career*
Years	Team	Apps	(Gls)
1995–1996	Konkola Blades	33	(26)
1996–1997	Witbank Aces	30	(23)
1997–1998	Sion	21	(14)
1998–2002	Orlando Pirates	100	(36)
2002–2003	Espérance		
2003–2004	Dangerous Darkies		
2004–2006	Moroka Swallows		
2006–2007	FC AK		
2007–2008	AmaZulu	16	(4)
2008–2009	Mpumalanga Black Aces		

International career
1994–2002	Zambia	78	(21)
- * Club domestic league appearances and goals

Dennis Lota (8 November 1973 – 4 February 2014) was a Zambian football striker.

He started his professional career with Zanaco FC of Zambia in 1989 before leaving for Nchanga Rangers at the beginning of the 1991 season. At Nchanga Rangers he established a midfield partnership with Abeauty Kunda. He later left Nchanga to join Kabwe Warriors after a failed attempt to rejoin Zanaco. At Warriors, he never settled and left after one season to join Konkola Blades.

It was at Konkala where the late brother to Kalusha Bwalya, Benjamin transformed Lota from a midfielder to a lethal striker who went on to win the golden boot in 1995 and later became a strong target for international clubs.

A contractual conflict later emerged between FC Sion and Dangerous Aces with each team claiming to be the rightful owner of the player. The matter was later resolved and Lota went on to play for the former. Upon leaving FC Sion, Lota joined Orlando Pirates.

He was part of the Zambian African Nations Cup teams in 1996, 1998, 2000 and 2002. He has two brothers who are also footballers, Charles Lota (younger) and Lawrence Lota (older). At the 2002 African Cup of Nations, Dennis played alongside Charles in the Zambian attack formation.

In March 2011, the football team Moroka Swallows had elevated Dennis Lota to the first team as one of the assistant coaches.

Lota died on 4 February 2014 in South Africa of suspected malaria. Before his death following a brief illness in 2014, he served as an assistant coach at South African football club Moroka Swallows.
