= Joseph Mutyaba =

Ugandan footballer and coach (1959–2004)

Joseph Harold Mutyaba
Personal information
- Full name: Joseph Harold Mutyaba
- Date of birth: 25 December 1974
- Place of birth: Entebbe, Uganda
- Position: Midfielder

Senior career*
Years	Team	Apps	(Gls)
1992–1997	Express FC		
1998–1999	SC Villa		
2004–2005	Uganda Revenue Authority FC		
2006	Quang Nam		

International career
1994–1998	Uganda		

Managerial career
- 2015–2016: Lweza FC
- 2016: Busia Fisheries FC
- 2017: Masavu FC
- 2017–2018: Kabale Good Samaritan FC
- 2018–2021: Tooro United FC
- 2021: Onduparaka FC
- 2021–2023: Malindi SC
- 2023–2024: Soltilo Bright Stars FC
- 2026–present: Kigezi HomeBoyz FC FC
- * Club domestic league appearances and goals

Joseph Harold Mutyaba (born on 25 December 1974) is a Ugandan football coach and former footballer who played as a midfielder.

== Early life and education background ==
Mutyaba was born on 25 December 1974 in Entebbe, Uganda to Charles Ssetuba, who played for Express FC in the 1960s.

He attended Entebbe Primary School before continuing to Entebbe Parents and Entebbe Secondary School. He later joined Nkumba College of Commerce (now Nkumba University), where he completed his studies.

Mutyaba holds CAF C licence, CAF B licence he obtained in 2015 through a FUFA–CAF coaching course and CAF A Coaching licence he obtained in 2016.

== Playing career ==
Mutyaba began his football career with Entebbe Works FC before he was selected to represent Uganda at the Africa U-18 Youth Championship in Sudan in 1990. In 1992, he joined Express FC as a trainee under coach David Otti and made his senior debut on 22 January 1993 against Sudanese club Al Hilal in the CECAFA Club Championship and he remained with Express FC until 1997.

In 1998, he joined SC Villa, where he played until 1999 and then Mutyaba moved to Omani club Fanja SC for the 1999–2000 season before returning to Uganda to rejoin Express FC between 2000 and 2003. In 2004, he joined Uganda Revenue Authority FC (URA FC), where he played until 2005 and won the Uganda Cup in 2005. He concluded his playing career with Quảng Nam FC in Vietnam in 2006.

Mutyaba played for the Uganda Cranes, making his debut on 15 October 1994. He represented Uganda in the 1996 and 1998 Africa Cup of Nations qualification campaigns and was part of the team that won the 1996 CECAFA Senior Challenge Cup.

== Coaching career ==
After retiring from professional football, Mutyaba transitioned into coaching. Mutyaba began is coaching career as an assistant coach at BUL FC before becoming a head coach. In 2015, he was appointed as the head coach of Lweza FC and remained there until July 2016.

In July 2016, he left Lweza FC and joined Busia Fisheries FC. Following his departure from Busia Fisheries FC in November 2016, Mutyaba joined Masavu FC in August 2017 as part of the club's technical team and Kabale Good Samaritan FC, where he guided the club to promotion to the FUFA Big League.

He later became head coach of Tooro United FC, serving until 2021, before taking charge of Onduparaka FC from 30 March to 8 June 2021. From there, he coached Malindi Sports Club in Zanzibar until August 2023, when he returned to Uganda to become the head coach of Soltilo Bright Stars FC. He remained at Bright Stars until 1 October 2024. On 24 June 2026, Mutyaba was appointed head coach of Kigezi HomeBoyz FC on a two-year contract ahead of the club's first Uganda Premier League season.

== Achievements ==
Mutyaba won:

- the Ugandan League with Express FC in 1993, 1995 and 1996
- the Uganda Cup also known as Kakungulu Cup with Express FC (1994, 1995, 1997 & 2001), SC Villa (1998) and URA FC (2005)
- the CECAFA Senior Challenge Cup with the Uganda national team (Uganda Cranes) in 1996

Mutyaba led Kabale Good Samaritan FC to promotion to the FUFA Big League

He guided Lweza FC to promotion to the Uganda Premier League

== See also ==
- Express FC
- URA FC
- Jackson Mayanja
- Paul Hasule
