= Keitumetse Paul =

Motswana footballer (1973–2021)

Personal information
- Full name: Keitumetse Pio Paul
- Date of birth: 19 May 1973
- Place of birth: Botswana
- Date of death: 13 August 2021 (aged 48)
- Position: Midfielder

Senior career*
Years	Team	Apps	(Gls)
1993–2001	Mochudi Centre Chiefs		
2001–2003	Chico Rooks		
2003–2005	Uniao Flamengo Santos		

International career^{‡}
1995–2002	Botswana		
- * Club domestic league appearances and goals ‡ National team caps and goals as of 13:10, 21 December 2009 (UTC)

Keitumetse Paul (19 May 1973 - 13 August 2021) was a Motswana former footballer who played as a midfielder.

He played for the Botswana national football team between 1995 and 2002. He coached the under-20s national football team between 2015 and 2020.

On 13 August 2021, he died from complications linked to COVID-19.
