= Lucky Richter =

Namibian footballer (1964–2021)

Albert Lucky Richter (23 September 1964 – 2 July 2021) was a Namibian football manager and player.

== Early life ==
Richter was born and raised in Windhoek, Namibia, and started playing football at a young age.

== Playing career ==
A winger, Richter was nicknamed "Bazooka". He has been regarded as one of the most entertaining players to watch in Namibia. He played for Black Africa and abroad for South African club Bloemfontein Celtic.

== Style of play ==
Richter was known for his dribbling ability.

== Managerial career ==
After retiring from professional football, Richter worked as a manager.

== Death ==
Richter died on 2 July 2021, aged 57, from COVID-19.
