= 1996 African Cup of Nations =

20th edition of the Africa Cup of Nations

- Official logo

Tournament details
- Host country: South Africa
- Dates: 13 January – 3 February
- Teams: 15
- Venues: 4 (in 4 host cities)

Final positions
- Champions: South Africa (1st title)
- Runners-up: Tunisia
- Third place: Zambia
- Fourth place: Ghana

Tournament statistics
- Matches played: 29
- Goals scored: 78 (2.69 per match)
- Attendance: 640,880 (22,099 per match)
- Top scorer(s): (Zambia) Kalusha Bwalya (5 goals)
- Best player: (Zambia) Kalusha Bwalya

The 1996 African Cup of Nations, also known as the Coca-Cola 1996 Africa Cup of Nations for sponsorship reasons, was the 20th edition of the African Cup of Nations, the international football championship run by the Confederation of African Football (CAF). It was hosted by South Africa, who replaced original hosts Kenya. The field expanded for the first time to sixteen teams, split into four groups of four; the top two teams in each group advanced to the quarter-finals. However, Nigeria withdrew from the tournament at the final moment under pressure from then-dictator Sani Abacha, reducing the final number of teams to fifteen.

Hosts South Africa won a first championship, defeating Tunisia 2–0 in the final. The tournament was covered in the 2026 documentary series “Class of ‘96: Rise of a Nation”.

== Qualified teams ==
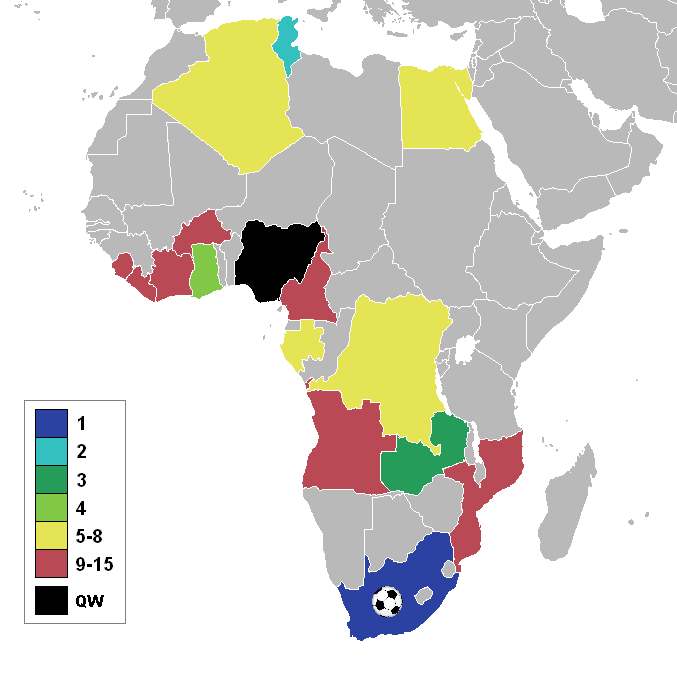
Participating nations

For full qualification see: 1996 African Cup of Nations qualification

Team	Qualified as	Qualified on	Previous appearances in tournament (Note: Bold indicates champion for that year, Italic indicates host.)
South Africa	Hosts		0 (debut)
~~Nigeria~~ (Note: Nigeria withdrew prior to the start of the finals. Guinea, as the best side to not qualify, was offered Nigeria's spot in the finals, but declined due to a lack of preparation time.)	Holders	10 April 1994	10 (1963, 1976, 1978, **1980**, 1982, 1984, 1988, 1990, 1992, **1994**)
Gabon	Group 5 winners	4 June 1995	1 (1994)
Zaire	Group 1 winners	4 June 1995	9 (1965, **1968**, 1970, 1972, **1974**, 1976, 1988, 1992, 1994)
Zambia	Group 5 runners-up	15 July 1995	7 (1974, 1978, 1982, 1986, 1990, 1992, 1994)
Algeria	Group 4 runners-up	30 July 1995	8 (1968, 1980, 1982, 1984, 1986, 1988, **1990**, 1992)
Angola	Group 6 winners	30 July 1995	0 (debut)
Burkina Faso	Group 7 winners	30 July 1995	1 (1978)
Cameroon	Group 1 runners-up	30 July 1995	8 (1970, 1972, 1982, **1984**, 1986, **1988**, 1990, 1992)
Egypt	Group 4 winners	30 July 1995	14 (**1957**, **1959**, 1962, 1963, 1970, 1974, 1976, 1980, 1984, **1986**, 1988, 1990, 1992, 1994)
Ghana	Group 3 winners	30 July 1995	10 (**1963**, **1965**, 1968, 1970, **1978**, 1980, **1982**, 1984, 1992, 1994)
Ivory Coast	Group 7 runners-up	30 July 1995	11 (1965, 1968, 1970, 1974, 1980, 1984, 1986, 1988, 1990, **1992**, 1994)
Liberia	Group 2 runners-up	30 July 1995	0 (debut)
Mozambique	Group 6 runners-up	30 July 1995	1 (1986)
Sierra Leone	Group 3 runners-up	30 July 1995	1 (1994)
Tunisia	Group 2 winners	30 July 1995	6 (1962, 1963, 1965, 1978, 1982, 1994)

== Venues ==
Johannesburg	1996 African Cup of Nations is located in South Africa	Durban
FNB Stadium	1996 African Cup of Nations is located in South Africa	Kings Park Stadium
Capacity: 80,000	1996 African Cup of Nations is located in South Africa	Capacity: 52,000
Bloemfontein	1996 African Cup of Nations is located in South Africa	Port Elizabeth
Free State Stadium	1996 African Cup of Nations is located in South Africa	EPRU Stadium
Capacity: 40,000	1996 African Cup of Nations is located in South Africa	Capacity: 33,852

== Group stage ==
=== Group A ===
Pos	Team	Pld	W	D	L	GF	GA	GD	Pts	Qualification
1	South Africa (H)	3	2	0	1	4	1	+3	6	Advance to knockout stage
2	Egypt	3	2	0	1	4	3	+1	6	Advance to knockout stage
3	Cameroon	3	1	1	1	5	7	−2	4	
4	Angola	3	0	1	2	4	6	−2	1	

(H) Hosts
13 January 1996

South Africa	3–0	Cameroon
Masinga 15'; Williams 37'; Moshoeu 55'

FNB Stadium, Johannesburg
Attendance: 75,000
Referee: Said Belqola (Morocco)
15 January 1996

Egypt	2–1	Angola
El-Kass 30', 33'		Quinzinho 77'

FNB Stadium, Johannesburg
Attendance: 6,000
Referee: Sidi Bekaye Magassa (Mali)

18 January 1996

Cameroon	2–1	Egypt
Omam-Biyik 36' (pen.); Tchami 59'		Maher 48'

FNB Stadium, Johannesburg
Attendance: 4,000
Referee: Lim Kee Chong (Mauritius)
20 January 1996

South Africa	1–0	Angola
Williams 57'

FNB Stadium, Johannesburg
Attendance: 28,000
Referee: Fethi Boucetta (Tunisia)

24 January 1996

South Africa	0–1	Egypt
		El-Kass 7'

FNB Stadium, Johannesburg
Attendance: 20,000
Referee: Lucien Bouchardeau (Niger)
24 January 1996

Angola	3–3	Cameroon
Joni 38' (pen.); Paulão 57'; Quinzinho 80'		Omam-Biyik 25'; Mouyeme 82'; Vicente 90' (o.g.)

Kings Park Stadium, Durban
Attendance: 6,000
Referee: Mohamed Kouradji (Algeria)

=== Group B ===
Pos	Team	Pld	W	D	L	GF	GA	GD	Pts	Qualification
1	Zambia	3	2	1	0	9	1	+8	7	Advance to knockout stage
2	Algeria	3	2	1	0	4	1	+3	7	Advance to knockout stage
3	Sierra Leone	3	1	0	2	2	7	−5	3	
4	Burkina Faso	3	0	0	3	3	9	−6	0	

14 January 1996

Zambia	0–0	Algeria

Free State Stadium, Bloemfontein
Attendance: 9,000
Referee: Ali Bujsaim (United Arab Emirates)
15 January 1996

Sierra Leone	2–1	Burkina Faso
Sessay 11'; Kallon 89'		Ouédraogo 74'

Free State Stadium, Bloemfontein
Attendance: 1,500
Referee: Okoampa (Ghana)

18 January 1996

Algeria	2–0	Sierra Leone
Meçabih 41', 63'

Free State Stadium, Bloemfontein
Attendance: 1,500
Referee: Ian McLeod (South Africa)
20 January 1996

Zambia	5–1	Burkina Faso
Malitoli 18'; K. Bwalya 24', 35'; Lota 44'; J. Bwalya 45'		Y. Traoré 53'

Free State Stadium, Bloemfontein
Attendance: 2,000
Referee: Masayoshi Okada (Japan)

24 January 1996

Algeria	2–1	Burkina Faso
Lounici 2'; Dziri 75'		Zongo 83'

EPRU Stadium, Port Elizabeth
Attendance: 180
Referee: Charles Masembe (Uganda)
24 January 1996

Zambia	4–0	Sierra Leone
K. Bwalya 2', 9', 84'; Malitoli 87'

Free State Stadium, Bloemfontein
Attendance: 200
Referee: Lim Kee Chong (Mauritius)

=== Group C ===
Pos	Team	Pld	W	D	L	GF	GA	GD	Pts	Qualification
1	Gabon	2	1	0	1	3	2	+1	3	Advance to knockout stage
2	Zaire	2	1	0	1	2	2	0	3	Advance to knockout stage
3	Liberia	2	1	0	1	2	3	−1	3	

16 January 1996

Gabon	1–2	Liberia
Nzeng 59'		Sebwe 5' (pen.); Sarr 54'

Kings Park Stadium, Durban
Attendance: 5,000
Referee: Gamal Al-Ghandour (Egypt)

19 January 1996

Gabon	2–0	Zaire
Mackaya 21' (pen.); Bekogo 34'

Kings Park Stadium, Durban
Attendance: 4,000
Referee: Omer Yengo (Congo)

25 January 1996

Zaire	2–0	Liberia
Lukaku 5' (pen.); Essende 72'

FNB Stadium, Johannesburg
Attendance: 3,000
Referee: Said Belqola (Morocco)

Nigeria withdrew, so their three matches were canceled.

- vs Zaire, 16 January 1996
- vs Liberia, 19 January 1996
- vs Gabon, 25 January 1996

=== Group D ===
Pos	Team	Pld	W	D	L	GF	GA	GD	Pts	Qualification
1	Ghana	3	3	0	0	6	1	+5	9	Advance to knockout stage
2	Tunisia	3	1	1	1	5	4	+1	4	Advance to knockout stage
3	Ivory Coast	3	1	0	2	2	5	−3	3	
4	Mozambique	3	0	1	2	1	4	−3	1	

14 January 1996

Ghana	2–0	Ivory Coast
Yeboah 20'; Pele 70'

EPRU Stadium, Port Elizabeth
Attendance: 8,000
Referee: Masayoshi Okada (Japan)
16 January 1996

Tunisia	1–1	Mozambique
Berkhissa 24'		Tico-Tico 4'

EPRU Stadium, Port Elizabeth
Attendance: 1,000
Referee: Charles Masembe (Uganda)

19 January 1996

Ghana	2–1	Tunisia
Pele 50'; Akonnor 77'		Ben Younes 72'

EPRU Stadium, Port Elizabeth
Attendance: 1,000
Referee: Petros Mathabela (South Africa)
21 January 1996

Ivory Coast	1–0	Mozambique
Tiéhi 32'

EPRU Stadium, Port Elizabeth
Attendance: 500
Referee: Gamal Al-Ghandour (Egypt)

25 January 1996

Tunisia	3–1	Ivory Coast
Ben Younes 32', 38'; Ben Hassen 48'		M. Traoré 84'

EPRU Stadium, Port Elizabeth
Attendance: 1,000
Referee: Sidi Bekaye Magassa (Mali)
25 January 1996

Ghana	2–0	Mozambique
Pele 42'; Aboagye 68'

Free State Stadium, Bloemfontein
Attendance: 3,500
Referee: Ali Bujsaim (United Arab Emirates)

== Knockout stage ==
=== Bracket ===
Quarter-finals
27 January – Johannesburg
South Africa	2
Algeria	1
28 January – Port Elizabeth
Ghana	1
Zaire	0
27 January – Bloemfontein
Zambia	3
Egypt	1
28 January – Durban
Gabon	1 (1)
Tunisia (p)	1 (4)

Semi-finals
31 January – Johannesburg
South Africa	3
Ghana	0
31 January – Durban
Zambia	2
Tunisia	4

Final
3 February – Johannesburg
South Africa	2
Tunisia	0
Third place
3 February – Johannesburg
Ghana	0
Zambia	1

=== Quarter-finals ===
27 January 1996

South Africa	2–1	Algeria
Fish 72'; Moshoeu 85'	Report	Lazizi 84'

FNB Stadium, Johannesburg
Attendance: 80,000
Referee: Ali Bujsaim (United Arab Emirates)

27 January 1996

Zambia	3–1	Egypt
Litana 58'; Mutale 65'; Lota 76'	Report	S. Kamouna 43'

Free State Stadium, Bloemfontein
Attendance: 8,500
Referee: Charles Masembe (Uganda)

28 January 1996

Gabon	1–1 (a.e.t.)	Tunisia
Mackaya 16'	Report	Baya 10'
Penalties
Mackaya (penalty missed); Ngoma (penalty missed); Bekogo (penalty scored)	1–4	(penalty scored) Sellimi; (penalty scored) Fekhi; (penalty scored) Ben Slimane; (penalty scored) El Ouaer

Kings Park Stadium, Durban
Attendance: 4,000
Referee: Lim Kee Chong (Mauritius)

28 January 1996

Ghana	1–0	Zaire
Yeboah 22'	Report

EPRU Stadium, Port Elizabeth
Attendance: 8,000
Referee: Sidi Bekaye Magassa (Mali)

=== Semi-finals ===
31 January 1996

South Africa	3–0	Ghana
Moshoeu 22', 87'; Bartlett 46'

FNB Stadium, Johannesburg
Attendance: 75,000
Referee: Gamal Al-Ghandour (Egypt)

31 January 1996

Zambia	2–4	Tunisia
Lota 68'; Makasa 90'		Sellimi 16', 85' (pen.); Baya 20'; Ghodhbane 47'

Kings Park Stadium, Durban
Attendance: 5,000
Referee: Lucien Bouchardeau (Niger)

=== Third place match ===
3 February 1996

Ghana	0–1	Zambia
		J. Bwalya 51'

FNB Stadium, Johannesburg
Attendance: 80,000
Referee: Omer Yengo (Republic of the Congo)

=== Final ===
3 February 1996

South Africa	2–0	Tunisia
Williams 73', 75'

FNB Stadium, Johannesburg
Attendance: 80,000
Referee: Charles Masembe (Uganda)

== Goalscorers ==
There were 78 goals scored in 29 matches, for an average of 2.69 goals per match.

5 goals

- (Zambia) Kalusha Bwalya

4 goals

- (South Africa) John Moshoeu
- (South Africa) Mark Williams

3 goals

- (Ghana) Abedi Pele
- (Egypt) Ahmed El-Kass
- (Tunisia) Imed Ben Younes
- (Zambia) Dennis Lota

2 goals

- (Algeria) Ali Meçabih
- (Angola) Quinzinho
- (Cameroon) François Omam-Biyik
- (Gabon) Brice Mackaya
- (Ghana) Tony Yeboah
- (Tunisia) Zoubeir Baya
- (Tunisia) Adel Sellimi
- (Zambia) Johnson Bwalya
- (Zambia) Kenneth Malitoli

1 goal

- (Algeria) Billel Dziri
- (Algeria) Tarek Lazizi
- (Algeria) Khaled Lounici
- (Angola) Joni
- (Angola) Paulão
- (Burkina Faso) Aboubakari Ouédraogo
- (Burkina Faso) Youssouf Traoré
- (Burkina Faso) Boureima Zongo
- (Cameroon) Georges Mouyémé
- (Cameroon) Alphonse Tchami
- (Ivory Coast) Joël Tiéhi
- (Ivory Coast) Moussa Traoré
- (Egypt) Samir Ibrahim
- (Egypt) Ali Maher
- (Gabon) Aurélien Bekogo
- (Gabon) Guy Nzeng
- (Ghana) Felix Aboagye
- (Ghana) Charles Akonnor
- (Ghana) Kwame Ayew
- (Liberia) Mass Sarr Jr.
- (Liberia) Kelvin Sebwe
- (Mozambique) Tico-Tico
- (Sierra Leone) Mohamed Kallon
- (Sierra Leone) Gbassay Sessay
- (South Africa) Shaun Bartlett
- (South Africa) Mark Fish
- (South Africa) Phil Masinga
- (Tunisia) Abdelkader Ben Hassen
- (Tunisia) Hédi Berkhissa
- (Tunisia) Kaies Ghodhbane
- (Zaire) Liombi Essende
- (Zaire) Roger Lukaku
- (Zambia) Elijah Litana
- (Zambia) Hillary Makasa
- (Zambia) Vincent Mutale

1 own goal

- (Angola) Hélder Vicente (for Cameroon)

== Team of the Tournament ==
Goalkeeper

- (Tunisia) Chokri El Ouaer

Defenders

- (Egypt) Yasser Radwan
- (South Africa) Mark Fish
- (Zambia) Elijah Litana
- (Ghana) Isaac Asare

Midfielders

- (Tunisia) Zoubeir Baya
- (Egypt) Hazem Emam
- (Ghana) Abedi Pele
- (South Africa) Mark Williams

Forwards

- (Zambia) Kalusha Bwalya
- (Ghana) Tony Yeboah
