= Georges Mouyémé =

Cameroonian footballer

Personal information
- Date of birth: 15 April 1971 (age 55)
- Place of birth: Douala, Cameroon
- Height: 1.77 m (5 ft 10 in)
- Position: Forward

Senior career*
Years	Team	Apps	(Gls)
1990–1991	Saint-Lô	22	(5)
1992–1994	Troyes	51	(30)
1994–1996	Angers	68	(15)
1997–1998	FC Homburg	39	(9)
1999–2001	Eintracht Trier		
2001	Shenyang Ginde		
2003–2004	AO Chania	10	(4)
2003–2004	Paris FC	11	(2)

International career
- Cameroon
- * Club domestic league appearances and goals

Georges L. Mouyémé-Elong (born 15 April 1971) is a Cameroonian former professional footballer who played as forward. At club level, he played for Saint-Lô, Troyes, Angers, and Paris FC in France, for FC Homburg and Eintracht Trier in Germany, for Shenyang Ginde in China, and for AO Chania in Greece.

For the Cameroon national team he participated at the 1994 FIFA World Cup.
