= 1994 African Cup of Nations squads =

List of footballers

Below is a list of squads used in the 1994 African Cup of Nations.

== Group A ==
=== Mali ===
Coach: Mamadou Keïta

No.	Pos.	Player	Date of birth (age)	Caps	Club
1	GK	Ousmane Farota	6 December 1964 (aged 29)		(Mali) Stade Malien
	GK	Karamoko Kéïta	21 September 1974 (aged 19)		(France) FCM Garges
	DF	Dramane Dembelé			(Mali) Djoliba AC
11	DF	Yatouma Diop	25 September 1972 (aged 21)		(Mali) Stade Malien
5	DF	Oumar Guindo	12 December 1969 (aged 24)		(Mali) Djoliba AC
2	DF	Moussa Keita			(Morocco) Crédit Agricole Salé
3	DF	Souleymane Sangaré	20 August 1969 (aged 24)		(Mali) Real Bamako
16	DF	Abdoul Karim Sidibé			(Mali) Djoliba AC
8	DF	Mobido Sidibé	7 January 1970 (aged 24)		(Mali) USFAS Bamako
17	MF	Amadou Pathé Diallo	11 October 1967 (aged 26)		(Portugal) Quarteirense
9	MF	Demba N'Diaye	26 October 1969 (aged 24)		(France) FA Île-Rousse
15	MF	Habib Sangaré	26 September 1969 (aged 24)		(Oman) Sohar SC
20	MF	Sékou Sangaré	14 September 1974 (aged 19)		(France) AJ Auxerre
7	MF	Ibrahim Sory Touré	15 September 1970 (aged 23)		(Mali) Stade Malien
6	MF	Abdoulaye Traoré	13 August 1970 (aged 23)		(Réunion) SS Saint-Pauloise
14	MF	Brehima Traoré	23 August 1973 (aged 20)		(Mali) AS Mande
	FW	Soro Camara			(Mali) AS Biton
10	FW	Fernand Coulibaly	1 August 1971 (aged 22)		(Saudi Arabia) Al-Wahda
	FW	Makan Keita	16 December 1972 (aged 21)		(Mali) Djoliba AC
18	FW	Ousmane Soumano	31 December 1973 (aged 20)		Unattached
13	FW	Bassala Touré	26 February 1976 (aged 18)		(Morocco) KAC Marrakesh
19	FW	Soumaila Traoré	4 January 1973 (aged 21)		(Morocco) Raja Casablanca

=== Tunisia ===
Coach: Youssef Zouaoui (fired after the first match), replaced by Faouzi Benzarti

No.	Pos.	Player	Date of birth (age)	Caps	Club
	GK	Ali Boumnijel	13 April 1966 (aged 27)		(France) FC Gueugnon
1	GK	Chokri El Ouaer	15 August 1966 (aged 27)		(Tunisia) Espérance
	GK	Radhouane Salhi	18 December 1967 (aged 26)		(Tunisia) Etoile du Sahel
	DF	Mounir Boukadida	24 October 1967 (aged 26)		(Tunisia) Etoile du Sahel
4	DF	Taoufik Hichri	8 January 1965 (aged 29)		(Portugal) Vitória de Guimarães
14	DF	Mohamed Ali Mahjoubi	28 December 1966 (aged 27)		(Tunisia) Espérance
6	DF	Imed Mizouri	20 October 1966 (aged 27)		(Tunisia) Etoile du Sahel
5	DF	Mourad Okbi	1 September 1965 (aged 28)		(Saudi Arabia) Al-Ahli
	DF	Ahmed Souissi	7 December 1960 (aged 33)		(Tunisia) CA Bizertin
2	DF	Tarek Thabet	16 August 1971 (aged 22)		(Tunisia) Espérance
	DF	Mohamed Trabelsi	7 January 1968 (aged 26)		(Tunisia) OC Kerkennah
	MF	Lofti Ben Sassi	27 October 1965 (aged 28)		(Tunisia) Olympique Béja
8	MF	Raouf Bouzaiene	16 August 1970 (aged 23)		(France) Stade Lavallois
	MF	Sirajeddine Chihi	16 April 1970 (aged 23)		(Tunisia) Espérance
	MF	Mourad Gharbi	21 January 1966 (aged 28)		(Tunisia) CA Bizertin
11	MF	Adel Sellimi	16 November 1972 (aged 21)		(Tunisia) Club Africain
	MF	Samir Sellimi	5 June 1970 (aged 23)		(Tunisia) Club Africain
13	MF	Skander Souayah	20 November 1972 (aged 21)		(Tunisia) Club Sportif Sfaxien
10	FW	Ayedi Hamrouni	24 December 1971 (aged 22)		(Tunisia) Espérance
	FW	Jameleddine Limam	11 June 1967 (aged 26)		(Tunisia) Stade Tunisien
7	FW	Faouzi Rouissi	20 March 1971 (aged 23)		(France) Caen
9	FW	Ziad Tlemcani	10 May 1963 (aged 30)		(Portugal) Vitória de Guimarães

=== Zaire ===
Coach: Kalala Mukendi

No.	Pos.	Player	Date of birth (age)	Caps	Club
22	GK	Kasango Mpia			DC Motema Pembe
1	GK	Bulayima Mukuayanzo	26 January 1969 (aged 25)		(Netherlands) Feyenoord
16	GK	Bilolo Tambwe			AS Vita Club
4	DF	Ntumba Danga	27 July 1963 (aged 30)		(Belgium) K.F.C. Lommel S.K.
7	DF	Kabwe Kasongo	31 July 1970 (aged 23)		(Zaire) DC Motema Pembe
15	DF	Epangala Lukose	20 April 1964 (aged 29)		AS Vita Club
6	DF	Loukima Tamoukini	6 September 1975 (aged 18)		AS Vita Club
	DF	Mbaki Makengo	13 April 1969 (aged 24)		(Belgium) Hoogstraten VV
2	DF	Mansoni Ngombo	25 October 1963 (aged 30)		(Belgium) R.F.C. Seraing
3	DF	José Nzau	21 October 1968 (aged 25)		(France) RC Paris
19	MF	Basaula Lemba	3 March 1965 (aged 29)		(Portugal) Vitória de Guimarães
5	MF	Kubu Lembi	19 August 1972 (aged 21)		(Belgium) R. Antwerp F.C.
	MF	Lugomgola Mateso			(Belgium) KFC Diest
14	MF	Kabeya Mukanya	1 May 1968 (aged 25)		(Belgium) K.F.C. Lommel S.K.
20	MF	Mbote Ndinga	11 September 1966 (aged 27)		(Portugal) Vitória de Guimarães
	MF	Yoko Ngwengwe	12 December 1970 (aged 23)		DC Motema Pembe
	FW	Elos Elonga-Ekakia	5 February 1974 (aged 20)		(Belgium) K.S.K. Beveren
11	FW	Menana Lukaku	6 June 1967 (aged 26)		(Belgium) R.F.C. Seraing
	FW	Mayo Mbunga			AS Dragons
8	FW	Ekanza Nsimba	9 August 1969 (aged 24)		(Belgium) K. Beerschot V.A.C.
21	FW	Nsumbu Ngoy	30 October 1972 (aged 21)		(Belgium) Germinal Ekeren
	FW	Bunene Ngaduane	30 July 1972 (aged 21)		(South Africa) QwaQwa Stars

== Group B ==
=== Egypt ===
Coach: Taha Ismail

No.	Pos.	Player	Date of birth (age)	Caps	Club
1	GK	Hussein El-Sayed	13 December 1964 (aged 29)		(Egypt) Al-Zamalek
21	GK	Saafane El-Saghir	7 January 1968 (aged 26)		(Egypt) Ismaily SC
22	GK	Ahmed Shobair	28 September 1960 (aged 33)		(Egypt) Al Ahly
13	DF	Hamza El-Gamal	2 March 1970 (aged 24)		(Egypt) Ismaily SC
4	DF	Islam Fathi	28 January 1970 (aged 24)		(Egypt) Al-Qanah
3	DF	Fawzi Gamal	23 October 1966 (aged 27)		(Egypt) Ismaily SC
17	DF	Talaat Mansour	26 February 1967 (aged 27)		(Egypt) Al-Zamalek
2	DF	Hany Ramzy	10 March 1969 (aged 25)		(Switzerland) Neuchâtel Xamax
20	DF	Mohamed Youssef	9 October 1970 (aged 23)		(Egypt) Al Ahly
5	DF	Mohamed Abdel-Galil	2 October 1968 (aged 25)		(Egypt) Al Ahly
9	MF	Ashraf Kasem	25 July 1966 (aged 27)		(Saudi Arabia) Al Hilal SFC
12	MF	Reda Abdel-Aal	15 March 1965 (aged 29)		(Egypt) Al Ahly
15	MF	Mohamed Fikry El-Saghir	17 October 1963 (aged 30)		(Egypt) Ismaily SC
6	MF	Khaled El-Ghandour	27 July 1970 (aged 23)		(Egypt) Al-Zamalek
10	MF	Ahmed El-Kass	8 July 1965 (aged 28)		(Egypt) Al-Olympi
7	MF	Ali Yahia	15 August 1969 (aged 24)		(Egypt) Al-Qanah
8	MF	Ashraf Youssef	5 October 1965 (aged 28)		(Egypt) Al-Zamalek
11	FW	Yasser Rayyan	26 March 1970 (aged 24)		(Egypt) Al Ahly
19	FW	Ibrahim El-Masry	19 August 1971 (aged 22)		(Egypt) Al-Masry
16	FW	Ayman Mansour	9 September 1963 (aged 30)		(Egypt) Al-Zamalek
18	FW	Mohamed Ramadan	15 November 1970 (aged 23)		(Egypt) Al Ahly
14	FW	Bashir Abdel Samad	20 August 1966 (aged 27)		(Egypt) Ismaily SC

=== Gabon ===
Coach: (Belgium) Jean Thissen

No.	Pos.	Player	Date of birth (age)	Caps	Club
	GK	Claude Babe	17 January 1970 (aged 24)		(Gabon) AS Sogara
1	GK	Germain Mendome	21 August 1970 (aged 23)		(Gabon) AS Sogara
	GK	Amel Rolenga	18 September 1964 (aged 29)		(Gabon) Mbilinga FC
11	DF	Francois Amegasse	10 October 1965 (aged 28)		(Gabon) Mbilinga FC
6	DF	Pierre Aubameyang	29 May 1965 (aged 28)		(France) Le Havre
	DF	Michel Biyoghe	9 December 1970 (aged 23)		(Gabon) Petrosport
	DF	Francis Koumba	16 July 1970 (aged 23)		(Gabon) Petrosport
3	DF	Tristan Mombo	24 August 1970 (aged 23)		(Gabon) Mbilinga FC
9	DF	Parfait Ndong	23 July 1971 (aged 22)		(Gabon) Mbilinga FC
	DF	Adrien Nkoumba	24 July 1967 (aged 26)		(Gabon) AS Sogara
	DF	Thierry Retoa	27 November 1967 (aged 26)		(Gabon) AS Sogara
4	MF	Etienne Kassa Ngoma	13 June 1962 (aged 31)		(Gabon) AS Sogara
	MF	Germain Mintsa	1969		(Gabon) FC 105 Libreville
	MF	Jean Moutsinga	1965		(Gabon) FC 105 Libreville
7	MF	Jean-Daniel N'Dong-Nze	24 January 1970 (aged 24)		(Gabon) Petrosport
21	MF	Placide Nyangala	30 December 1967 (aged 26)		(France) Aurillac FCA
8	MF	Valery Ondo	14 August 1967 (aged 26)		(Gabon) Mbilinga FC
	MF	Jacques Pigna	1977		(Gabon) Mangasport
12	FW	Brice Mackaya	23 July 1968 (aged 25)		(Gabon) Petrosport
10	FW	Regis Manon	22 October 1965 (aged 28)		(Gabon) FC 105 Libreville
15	FW	Guy Roger Nzamba	13 July 1970 (aged 23)		(France) Mulhouse
	FW	Jonas Ogandaga	1 August 1975 (aged 18)		(Gabon) AS Sogara

=== Nigeria ===
Coach: (Netherlands) Clemens Westerhof

No.	Pos.	Player	Date of birth (age)	Caps	Club
1	GK	Wilfred Agbonavbare	5 October 1965 (aged 28)		(Spain) Rayo Vallecano
2	DF	Augustine Eguavoen	19 August 1965 (aged 28)		(Belgium) Kortrijk
3	DF	Benedict Iroha	29 November 1969 (aged 24)		(Netherlands) Vitesse
4	DF	Stephen Keshi	23 January 1962 (aged 32)		(Belgium) R.W.D. Molenbeek
5	DF	Uche Okechukwu	4 November 1967 (aged 26)		(Turkey) Fenerbahçe
6	DF	Uche Okafor	8 August 1967 (aged 26)		(Germany) Hannover 96
7	MF	Finidi George	15 April 1971 (aged 22)		(Netherlands) Ajax
8	MF	Thompson Oliha	4 October 1968 (aged 25)		(Ivory Coast) Africa Sports
9	FW	Rashidi Yekini	23 October 1963 (aged 30)		(Portugal) Vitoria Setubal
10	MF	Jay-Jay Okocha	14 August 1973 (aged 20)		(Germany) Eintracht Frankfurt
11	MF	Emmanuel Amuneke	25 December 1970 (aged 23)		(Egypt) Zamalek
12	DF	Isaac Semitoje	2 October 1967 (aged 26)		(Nigeria) Iwuanyanwu Nationale
13	FW	Samson Siasia	14 August 1967 (aged 26)		(France) Nantes
14	FW	Daniel Amokachi	30 December 1972 (aged 21)		(Belgium) Club Brugge
15	MF	Sunday Oliseh	14 September 1974 (aged 19)		(Belgium) RFC Liège
16	GK	Alloysius Agu	12 July 1967 (aged 26)		(Belgium) RFC Liège
17	FW	Victor Ikpeba	12 June 1973 (aged 20)		(France) AS Monaco
18	FW	Efan Ekoku	8 June 1967 (aged 26)		(England) Norwich City
19	DF	Nduka Ugbade	6 September 1969 (aged 24)		(Nigeria) Calabar Rovers
20	MF	Edema Fuludu	8 May 1970 (aged 23)		(Nigeria) BCC Lions
21	MF	Mutiu Adepoju	22 December 1970 (aged 23)		(Spain) Racing Santander
22	GK	Peter Rufai	24 August 1963 (aged 30)		(Netherlands) Go Ahead Eagles

== Group C ==
=== Ivory Coast ===
Coach: (Poland) Henryk Kasperczak

No.	Pos.	Player	Date of birth (age)	Caps	Club
1	GK	Alain Gouaméné	15 June 1966 (aged 27)		(Ivory Coast) ASEC Abidjan
	GK	Losseni Konaté	29 December 1972 (aged 21)		(Ivory Coast) ASEC Abidjan
	GK	Obou Macaire	28 December 1970 (aged 23)		(Ivory Coast) Africa Sports
19	DF	Sam Abouo	26 December 1973 (aged 20)		(Ivory Coast) ASEC Abidjan
2	DF	Basile Aka Kouame	6 April 1963 (aged 30)		(Ivory Coast) ASEC Abidjan
20	DF	Lassina Dao	6 February 1971 (aged 23)		(Ivory Coast) ASEC Abidjan
6	DF	Vilasco Fallet	27 January 1969 (aged 25)		(Ivory Coast) ASEC Abidjan
	DF	Jean-Marie Gbahou	1 April 1973 (aged 20)		(Ivory Coast) ASEC Abidjan
3	DF	Arsène Hobou	30 October 1967 (aged 26)		(Ivory Coast) Africa Sports
	MF	Célestin Amani			(Ivory Coast) Africa Sports
14	MF	Aliou Sibi Badra	26 February 1971 (aged 23)		(Ivory Coast) ASEC Abidjan
	MF	Yacouba Komara	8 January 1971 (aged 23)		(Ivory Coast) Africa Sports
7	MF	Tchiressoua Guel	27 December 1975 (aged 18)		(Ivory Coast) ASEC Abidjan
15	MF	Adama Clofie Kone	26 July 1969 (aged 24)		(Ivory Coast) ASEC Abidjan
17	MF	Serge-Alain Maguy	20 October 1970 (aged 23)		(Spain) Atlético Madrid
21	MF	Donald-Olivier Sie	3 April 1970 (aged 23)		(Ivory Coast) ASEC Abidjan
4	MF	Yao Amani	17 September 1963 (aged 30)		(Ivory Coast) Africa Sports
9	FW	Michel Bassolé	18 July 1972 (aged 21)		(Ivory Coast) ASEC Abidjan
11	FW	Eugène Beugré Yago	15 December 1969 (aged 24)		(Ivory Coast) Africa Sports
10	FW	Abdoulaye Traoré	4 March 1967 (aged 27)		(Ivory Coast) ASEC Abidjan
18	FW	Ahmed Ouattara	15 December 1969 (aged 24)		(Ivory Coast) Africa Sports
12	FW	Joël Tiéhi	12 June 1964 (aged 29)		(France) Le Havre

=== Sierra Leone ===
Coach: (France) Raymond Zarpanelian

No.	Pos.	Player	Date of birth (age)	Caps	Club
	GK	Brima Kamara	5 May 1972 (aged 21)		(Sierra Leone) East End Lions
1	GK	Osaid Marah	26 May 1960 (aged 33)		(Belgium) K.V.K. Tienen
	DF	Vannie Bockarie	18 January 1975 (aged 19)		(Sierra Leone) Kamboi Eagles
	DF	Kemokai Kallon	17 March 1972 (aged 22)		(Guinea) AS Kaloum Star
	DF	Abubakar Kamara	15 April 1977 (aged 16)		(Sierra Leone) East End Lions
	DF	Mohamed Kanu	5 July 1968 (aged 25)		(Belgium) Eendracht Aalst
	DF	Basiru King	3 March 1971 (aged 23)		(Cameroon) Union Douala
	DF	Mohamed Mansaray	25 December 1974 (aged 19)		(Belgium) K. Boom F.C.
	DF	Abdoulay Sessay	1 January 1970 (aged 24)		(Sierra Leone) Ports Authority F.C.
	MF	Lamine Bangura	18 April 1972 (aged 21)		(Guinea) Horoya AC
	MF	Abdul Thompson Conteh	2 July 1970 (aged 23)		(Guyana) Georgetown Cobras
	MF	Lamine Conteh	17 January 1976 (aged 18)		(Belgium) K. Beerschot V.A.C.
	MF	Abu Kanu	31 March 1972 (aged 21)		(Sierra Leone) East End Lions
	MF	Amidu Karim	10 January 1974 (aged 20)		(Sierra Leone) Mighty Blackpool
	MF	Ibrahim Koroma	4 July 1973 (aged 20)		(Belgium) K. Boom F.C.
	MF	John Sama	24 March 1972 (aged 22)		(Saudi Arabia) Al Tuhami
	MF	Matthews Tieh	18 October 1974 (aged 19)		(Sierra Leone) Mighty Blackpool
	FW	Leslie Allen	1971		(Gabon) Mbilinga FC
	FW	Kassim Conteh			(Sierra Leone) East End Lions
	FW	Brima George			(Sierra Leone) Diamond Stars
	FW	Musa Kanu	4 March 1976 (aged 18)		(Belgium) K.S.C. Lokeren
	FW	John Gbassay Sessay	11 May 1968 (aged 25)		(Portugal) Vitoria Setubal

=== Zambia ===
Coach: (Scotland) Ian Porterfield

No.	Pos.	Player	Date of birth (age)	Caps	Club
22	GK	John Mubanga			(Zambia) Nkana Red Devils
16	GK	Martin Mwamba	6 November 1964 (aged 29)		(Zambia) Power Dynamos FC
1	GK	James Phiri	13 February 1968 (aged 26)		(Zambia) Zanaco FC
13	DF	Aggrey Chiyangi	5 June 1964 (aged 29)		(Zambia) Power Dynamos FC
2	DF	Harrison Chongo	5 June 1969 (aged 24)		(Saudi Arabia) Al Taawon
3	DF	Elijah Litana	5 December 1970 (aged 23)		(Zambia) Roan United
5	DF	Mordon Malitoli	5 August 1968 (aged 25)		(Zambia) Nkana Red Devils
4	DF	Kapambwe Mulenga	1 January 1963 (aged 31)		(Zambia) Nkana Red Devils
21	DF	Kingsley Musabula	26 December 1973 (aged 20)		(Zambia) Zamsure FC
20	DF	Harrison Tembo	21 January 1969 (aged 25)		(Zambia) Kabwe Warriors
14	MF	Joel Bwalya	14 October 1972 (aged 21)		(Belgium) K.R.C. Harelbeke
8	MF	Tenant Chilumba	22 August 1972 (aged 21)		(Zambia) Power Dynamos FC
15	MF	John Lungu	12 June 1966 (aged 27)		(Zambia) Roan United
18	MF	Linos Makwaza	4 December 1965 (aged 28)		(Zambia) Power Dynamos FC
10	MF	Evans Sakala	10 October 1970 (aged 23)		(South Africa) Chatsworth Rangers
6	MF	Happy Sichikolo	22 November 1973 (aged 20)		(Zambia) Kabwe Warriors
7	FW	Johnson Bwalya	3 December 1967 (aged 26)		(Switzerland) FC Bulle
11	FW	Kalusha Bwalya	16 August 1963 (aged 30)		(Netherlands) PSV Eindhoven
12	FW	Kenneth Malitoli	20 August 1966 (aged 27)		(Tunisia) Espérance
17	FW	Gibby Mbasela	24 October 1962 (aged 31)		(Tunisia) Espérance
9	FW	Zeddy Saileti	16 January 1969 (aged 25)		(Zambia) Nkana Red Devils

== Group D ==
=== Ghana ===
Coach: Edward Aggrey-Fynn

No.	Pos.	Player	Date of birth (age)	Caps	Club
	GK	Simon Addo	11 December 1974 (aged 19)		(Ghana) Ashanti Gold SC
1	GK	Edward Ansah	1 February 1963 (aged 31)		(Ghana) Port Authority
	GK	Anthony Mensah	31 October 1972 (aged 21)		(Ghana) Asante Kotoko
	DF	Frank Amankwah	29 December 1971 (aged 22)		(Ghana) Asante Kotoko
	DF	Emmanuel Ampeah	22 April 1968 (aged 25)		(Ghana) Asante Kotoko
	DF	Emmanuel Armah	22 April 1968 (aged 25)		(Ghana) Hearts of Oak
5	DF	Anthony Baffoe	25 May 1965 (aged 28)		(France) Metz
	DF	Afo Dodoo	23 November 1973 (aged 20)		(Ghana) Ashanti Gold SC
13	DF	Agyeman Duah	17 October 1973 (aged 20)		(Ghana) Asante Kotoko
	DF	Stephen Frimpong Manso	15 May 1959 (aged 34)		(Ghana) Asante Kotoko
	DF	Alexander Opoku	31 August 1974 (aged 19)		(Germany) VfB Leipzig
	DF	Bernard Whyte	22 October 1968 (aged 25)		(Ghana) Hearts of Oak
	MF	Joachin Yaw Acheampong	2 November 1973 (aged 20)		(Ghana) Ashanti Gold SC
11	MF	Charles Akonnor	12 March 1974 (aged 20)		(Germany) Fortuna Köln
	MF	Samuel Johnson	25 July 1973 (aged 20)		(Ghana) Hearts of Oak
	MF	Nii Lamptey	16 December 1974 (aged 19)		(Netherlands) PSV Eindhoven
	MF	Oscar Laud	1 May 1976 (aged 17)		(Ghana) Dawu Youngsters
	FW	George Arthur	30 June 1968 (aged 25)		(Ghana) Asante Kotoko
10	FW	Abedi Pele	5 November 1962 (aged 31)		(France) Olympique Lyonnais
	FW	Kwame Ayew	28 December 1973 (aged 20)		(Italy) Lecce
8	FW	Prince Polley	4 May 1969 (aged 24)		(Netherlands) Twente
9	FW	Tony Yeboah	6 June 1966 (aged 27)		(Germany) Eintracht Frankfurt

=== Guinea ===
Coach: Naby Camara

No.	Pos.	Player	Date of birth (age)	Caps	Club
	GK	Fodé Laye Camara	28 September 1971 (aged 22)		(Guinea) Horoya AC
	GK	Saliou Diallo	3 November 1976 (aged 17)		(Guinea) Hafia FC
	DF	Abdoul Karim Bangoura	9 February 1970 (aged 24)		(France) Bastia
	DF	Sita Camara	11 March 1974 (aged 20)		(Guinea) Université Club Kankan
	DF	Ousmane Fernández	4 February 1969 (aged 25)		(Guinea) ASFAG
	DF	Karifa Sidibé			(France) Aubervilliers
	DF	Morlaye Soumah	4 November 1971 (aged 22)		(France) Valenciennes
	DF	Edgar Barbara Sylla	22 March 1970 (aged 24)		(France) Évry
	DF	Mohamadou Sylla			(Belgium) KFC Avenir Lembeek
	DF	Mohamed Ofei Sylla	15 August 1974 (aged 19)		(France) Vannes OC
	MF	Ansou Camara			(Belgium) R.W.D. Molenbeek
	MF	Ousmane N'Gom Camara	26 May 1975 (aged 18)		(Guinea) AS Kaloum Star
	MF	Sékou Oumar Drame	23 December 1973 (aged 20)		(Ivory Coast) Stade Abidjan
	MF	Sékou Soumah	18 August 1974 (aged 19)		(Netherlands) Willem II
	MF	Abdoul Salam Sow	13 August 1970 (aged 23)		(Belgium) K.V. Kortrijk
	MF	Mohamed Lamine Sylla	22 February 1971 (aged 23)		(Netherlands) Willem II
	MF	Pablo Thiam	3 January 1974 (aged 20)		(Germany) 1. FC Köln
	FW	Titi Camara	17 November 1972 (aged 21)		(France) AS Saint-Etienne
	FW	Fodé Camara	9 December 1973 (aged 20)		(Belgium) FCN Sint-Niklaas
	FW	Souleymane Oularé	16 October 1972 (aged 21)		(Belgium) K.S.K. Beveren
	FW	Alkhaly Soumah	6 April 1975 (aged 18)		(Guinea) Hafia FC

=== Senegal ===
Coach: Jules Bocandé and Saar Boubacar

No.	Pos.	Player	Date of birth (age)	Caps	Club
	GK	Papa Waly N'Diaye	10 April 1974 (aged 19)		(Senegal) ASC Jeanne d'Arc
	GK	René Charles N'Diaye			(Senegal) AS Douanes
1	GK	Cheikh Seck	8 January 1958 (aged 36)		Unattached
	DF	Moustapha Diagne	15 August 1966 (aged 27)		(France) Fontainebleau
	DF	Mamadou Mariem Diallo	2 March 1967 (aged 27)		(Senegal) Port Autonome
6	DF	Boubacar Gassama			(Senegal) Casa Sport
	DF	Momath Gueye			(Senegal) ASC Ndiambour
	DF	Aly Male	15 November 1970 (aged 23)		(Senegal) ASC Jeanne d'Arc
	DF	Adolphe Mendy	16 January 1960 (aged 34)		(Senegal) ASC Ndiambour
	DF	Issa Tambedou	28 September 1966 (aged 27)		(Senegal) Port Autonome
	MF	Moussa Kamara	26 January 1971 (aged 23)		(Senegal) AS Douanes
	MF	Lamine Moise Cissé	12 December 1971 (aged 22)		(Senegal) ASC Diaraf
	MF	Mamadou Faye	31 December 1967 (aged 26)		(France) Bastia
	MF	Mame Birame Mangane	19 November 1969 (aged 24)		(Portugal) Estrela da Amadora
	MF	Abdoul Yoro N'Diaye	22 September 1974 (aged 19)		(Senegal) AS Douanes
	MF	Lamine Sagna	17 November 1969 (aged 24)		(Senegal) ASC Diaraf
	FW	Mamadou Diallo	21 August 1971 (aged 22)		(Morocco) Kawkab Marrakesh
	FW	Mamadou Diarra	18 October 1970 (aged 23)		(Senegal) Port Autonome
	FW	Alassane Dione			(Senegal) AS Douanes
	FW	Souleymane Sané	26 February 1961 (aged 33)		(Germany) SG Wattenscheid 09
	FW	Atanas Tendeng	23 June 1970 (aged 23)		(Senegal) Casa Sport
	FW	Amara Traoré	25 September 1965 (aged 28)		(France) FC Gueugnon
