= 1994 African Cup of Nations qualification =

Football tournament

This page details the qualifying process qualifying for the 1994 African Cup of Nations. Zaire was originally chosen to host the final tournament, however it was replaced by Tunisia.

The qualification took place in 8 groups. 10 teams would progress to the tournament. Ivory Coast and Tunisia qualified automatically as defending champions and hosts respectively. Qualification began on 14 June 1992 and ended on 24 October 1993.

== Preliminary round ==
Team 1	Agg.	Team 2	1st leg	2nd leg	3rd leg
Lesotho	4–0	Botswana	0–0	4–0	
Guinea-Bissau	4–2	Cape Verde	3–1	0–1	1–0

14 June 1992

Lesotho	0–0	Botswana

Setsoto Stadium, Maseru
28 June 1992

Botswana	0–4	Lesotho
		Khali 20'; Lekhotla 46'; Mokhathi 60'; Mohale 85'

Botswana National Stadium, Gaborone

Lesotho won 4–0 on aggregate.

14 June 1992

Guinea-Bissau	3–1	Cape Verde

Bissau
28 June 1992

Cape Verde	1–0	Guinea-Bissau

Praia

Play-off

5 July 1992

Guinea-Bissau	1–0	Cape Verde

Bissau

Guinea-Bissau won 1–0 after the play-off.

== Qualifying round ==
=== Group 1 ===
Team	Pld	W	D	L	GF	GA	GD	Pts
Gabon	6	4	2	0	10	2	+8	10
Cameroon	6	3	3	0	7	0	+7	9
Niger	6	2	1	3	7	10	−3	5
Benin	6	0	0	6	3	15	−12	0

16 August 1992

Gabon	0–0	Cameroon

Stade Omar Bongo, Libreville
Attendance: 21,000
16 August 1992

Benin	1–2	Niger
Sossa 66'		Barkire 19'; Lembo 80'

Stade de l'Amitié, Cotonou
Attendance: 15,000
Referee: Mason Goe (Liberia)

30 August 1992

Cameroon	2–0	Benin
Ewane 27'; Tiki 60'

Stade Omnisports, Yaoundé
30 August 1992

Niger	1–3	Gabon
Lembo 11' (pen.)		Nzamba 4', 7', 83'

Stade Général Seyni Kountché, Niamey
Referee: Ousmane Souleymane Diallo (Burkina Faso)

11 April 1993

Gabon	2–0	Benin
Mombo 20'; Manon 23'

Stade Omar Bongo, Libreville
Attendance: 10,000
11 April 1993

Niger	0–0	Cameroon

Stade Général Seyni Kountché, Niamey

25 April 1993

Niger	4–1	Benin
Barkire; Lembo; Saley		Isoufou

Stade Général Seyni Kountché, Niamey
Attendance: 6,000
25 April 1993

Cameroon	0–0	Gabon

Stade Omnisports, Yaoundé
Attendance: 25,000

11 July 1993

Benin	0–3	Cameroon
		Tchami 12'; Embé 21'; Loga 90'

Stade de l'Amitié, Cotonou
11 July 1993

Gabon	3–0	Niger
Ndong Nzé 15'; Nzamba 75'; Mackaya 90'

Stade Omar Bongo, Libreville

25 July 1993

Benin	1–2	Gabon
Sacramento 52'		Nzamba 54', 89'

Stade de l'Amitié, Cotonou
Referee: Anthony Edusah (Ghana)
25 July 1993

Cameroon	2–0	Niger
Yombi 60'; Embé 67'

Stade Omnisports, Yaoundé

=== Group 2 ===
Team	Pld	W	D	L	GF	GA	GD	Pts
Nigeria	6	3	2	1	12	1	+11	8
Uganda	6	2	3	1	7	6	+1	7
Ethiopia	6	2	1	3	7	12	−5	5
Sudan	6	1	2	3	2	9	−7	4

15 August 1992

Uganda	3–1	Ethiopia
Mayanja 25', 30'; Aloro 80'		Yemani 75'

Nakivubo Stadium, Kampala
Attendance: 20,000
Referee: Martin Omondi Bita (Kenya)
16 August 1992

Sudan	0–0	Nigeria

Khartoum Stadium, Khartoum
Attendance: 26,000
Referee: Ali Tahir Hafidh (Tanzania)

29 August 1992

Nigeria	2–0	Uganda
Amokachi 16'; Siasia 87'

Surulere Stadium, Lagos
Referee: Jean Fidèle Diramba (Gabon)
30 August 1992

Ethiopia	3–0	Sudan
Habtemariam 35'; Kebede 43'; Begashaw 83'

Addis Ababa Stadium, Addis Ababa

11 April 1993

Sudan	1–1	Uganda
El-Neel 30' (pen.)		Sambo 45'

Khartoum Stadium, Khartoum
11 April 1993

Ethiopia	1–0	Nigeria
Ergicho 28'

Addis Ababa Stadium, Addis Ababa

23 April 1993

Nigeria	4–0	Sudan
Yekini 48' (pen.); Amunike 54', 87'; Ekpo 65'

Surulere Stadium, Lagos
24 April 1993

Ethiopia	2–2	Uganda

Addis Ababa Stadium, Addis Ababa

9 July 1993

Sudan	1–0	Ethiopia

Khartoum Stadium, Khartoum
17 July 1993

Uganda	0–0	Nigeria

Nakivubo Stadium, Kampala
Attendance: 25,000
Referee: Haroun Onderah (Kenya)

24 July 1993

Uganda	1–0	Sudan
Mayanja 20'

Nakivubo Stadium, Kampala
24 July 1993

Nigeria	6–0	Ethiopia
Inenga 29'; Yekini 33', 44', 64'; Ugbade 50'; Rufai 90' (pen.)

Surulere Stadium, Lagos

=== Group 3 ===
Algeria was disqualified for fielding ineligible player Mourad Karouf in the match against Senegal on 10 January 1993 in Dakar; their place was taken by Senegal who finished third.
Togo withdrew after completing 6 matches (4 draws, 2 losses); their results were annulled and are not listed below.

Team	Pld	W	D	L	GF	GA	GD	Pts
Sierra Leone	6	4	2	0	9	1	+8	10
Algeria (D)	6	4	1	1	13	4	+9	9
Senegal	6	2	1	3	8	9	−1	5
Guinea-Bissau	6	0	0	6	2	18	−16	0
Togo (W)	0	–	–	–	–	–	—	0

(D) Disqualified; (W) Withdrew
14 August 1992

Algeria	3–1	Guinea-Bissau
Meziane 13'; Rahmouni 20'; Saïb 49'		Sirou 60'

Ahmed Zabana Stadium, Oran
Attendance: 30,000
Referee: Kadry Abdel Azim (Egypt)
16 August 1992

Senegal	2–0 (Annulled)	Togo
Diallo 15', 36'

Stade de l'Amitié, Dakar
Referee: Omer Yengo (Congo)

29 August 1992

Sierra Leone	1–0	Algeria
Kallon 60'

National Stadium, Freetown
Referee: Mamadouba Camara (Guinea)
30 August 1992

Senegal	3–0	Guinea-Bissau
Diallo 45', 50'; Diop 67'

Stade de l'Amitié, Dakar
Referee: Bai Jobe (Gambia)

3 October 1992

Togo	0–0 (Annulled)	Algeria

Stade de Kégué, Lomé
Referee: Louis Yana (Cameroon)
4 October 1992

Guinea-Bissau	0–3	Sierra Leone

Estádio 24 de Setembro, Bissau
Referee: Sidi Békaye Magassa (Mali)

8 November 1992

Sierra Leone	2–0	Senegal

National Stadium, Freetown
8 November 1992

Togo	0–0 (Annulled)	Guinea-Bissau

Stade de Kégué, Lomé
Referee: Kabuya Kalumba (Zaire)

9 January 1993

Sierra Leone	0–0 (Annulled)	Togo

Stade du 28 Septembre, Conakry
10 January 1993

Senegal	1–2	Algeria
Goal		Meftah 26'; Brahimi 57'

Stade de l'Amitié, Dakar

24 January 1993

Togo	1–1 (Annulled)	Senegal
Akpalo 9'		Sané 22'

Stade de Kégué, Lomé
24 January 1993

Guinea-Bissau	1–4	Algeria
Forbes 10'		Rahmouni 21'; Tasfaout 31'; Dziri 75', 88'

Estádio 24 de Setembro, Bissau

9 April 1993

Algeria	0–0	Sierra Leone

19 May Stadium, Annaba
Attendance: 25,000
11 April 1993

Guinea-Bissau	0–3	Senegal
		Diallo 9', 30'; Mangane 68'

Estádio 24 de Setembro, Bissau

23 April 1993

Algeria	4–0 (Annulled)	Togo
Tasfaout 34', 42'; Brahimi 72'; Zekri 84'

Stade Birouana, Tlemcen
24 April 1993

Sierra Leone	2–0	Guinea-Bissau

National Stadium, Freetown

11 July 1993

Senegal	1–1	Sierra Leone
Mangane 14'		Mansaray 30'

Stade de l'Amitié, Dakar
11 July 1993

Guinea-Bissau	n/p	Togo
		Withdrew

Estádio 24 de Setembro, Bissau

25 July 1993

Algeria	4–0	Senegal
Tasfaout 3', 62', 76'; Zekri 32'

Stade Birouana, Tlemcen
26 July 1993

Togo	n/p	Sierra Leone
Withdrew

Stade de Kégué, Lomé

=== Group 4 ===
Team	Pld	W	D	L	GF	GA	GD	Pts
Zaire	6	3	2	1	13	3	+10	8
Kenya	6	3	2	1	11	6	+5	8
Mozambique	6	1	3	2	5	7	−2	5
Lesotho	6	0	3	3	4	17	−13	3

16 August 1992

Zaire	2–0	Mozambique
Kabongo 20', 85'

Stade des Martyrs, Kinshasa
16 August 1992

Lesotho	2–2	Kenya
Majoro 12'; Khali 42'		Onyera 32'; Nandwa 87'

Setsoto Stadium, Maseru
Referee: Wallace Mabuza (Swaziland)

29 August 1992

Kenya	1–3	Zaire
Nachok 55'		N'Gole 32'; Bapupa 49'; Okitakatshi 57'

Nyayo National Stadium, Nairobi
Referee: Joel Mondoka (Zambia)
30 August 1992

Mozambique	3–0	Lesotho
Tico-Tico

Estádio da Machava, Maputo
Referee: Gerald Gwatidzo (Zimbabwe)

11 April 1993

Mozambique	0–0	Kenya

Estádio da Machava, Maputo
11 April 1993

Lesotho	1–1	Zaire
Goal		Goal

Setsoto Stadium, Maseru

24 April 1993

Kenya	3–0	Lesotho
Nachok 15'; Origi 54', 71'

Nairobi City Stadium, Nairobi
25 April 1993

Mozambique	0–0	Zaire

Estádio da Machava, Maputo

11 July 1993

Zaire	0–1	Kenya
		Nachok 30'

Stade des Martyrs, Kinshasa
11 July 1993

Lesotho	1–1	Mozambique
Goal		Tico-Tico

Setsoto Stadium, Maseru

24 July 1993

Kenya	4–1	Mozambique
Odhiambo 23', 60'; Origi 65'; Nachok 68'		Tico-Tico 16'

Moi International Sports Centre, Nairobi
25 July 1993

Zaire	7–0	Lesotho
Nganzadi 7'; Masudi 18', 36', 79'; Lukaku 42', 77'; Ekanza 48'

Stade des Martyrs, Kinshasa

=== Group 5 ===
Team	Pld	W	D	L	GF	GA	GD	Pts
Zambia	6	4	2	0	10	2	+8	10
Zimbabwe	6	3	3	0	9	3	+6	9
South Africa	6	1	2	3	5	10	−5	4
Mauritius	6	0	1	5	2	11	−9	1

15 August 1992

Zambia	2–1	Mauritius
Nyirenda 55'; Makinka 66'		Philogène 2'

Independence Stadium, Lusaka
Attendance: 18,000
Referee: Getachew Mekonen (Ethiopia)

16 August 1992

Zimbabwe	4–1	South Africa
Takawira 7'; Gumbo 20'; Ndlovu 50' (pen.), 62'		Masinga 21'

Rufaro Stadium, Harare
Attendance: 51,000
Referee: Henry Mwafulirwa (Malawi)

30 August 1992

Mauritius	0–1	Zimbabwe
		Gumbo 38'

Sir Anerood Jugnauth Stadium, Belle Vue Maurel
Attendance: 18,000
Referee: Mady Kanoso Bora (Madagascar)

30 August 1992

South Africa	0–1	Zambia
		Mwitwa 72'

Soccer City, Johannesburg
Attendance: 20,000
Referee: Phuru Liphoto (Lesotho)

10 April 1993

Zambia	0–0	Zimbabwe

Independence Stadium, Lusaka
Attendance: 12,000

11 April 1993

South Africa	0–0	Mauritius

Rand Stadium, Johannesburg
Attendance: 20,000
Referee: Milkton Jaky (Madagascar)

24 April 1993

South Africa	1–1	Zimbabwe
Maponyane 6'		Nkonjera 80'

Soccer City, Johannesburg
Attendance: 30,000
Referee: João dos Nascimento (Angola)

25 April 1993

Mauritius	0–3	Zambia
		Mutale

Sir Anerood Jugnauth Stadium, Belle Vue Maurel
Attendance: 18,000

11 July 1993

Zimbabwe	2–0	Mauritius
Lunga 37'; Sawu 63'

Rufaro Stadium, Harare

11 July 1993

Zambia	3–0	South Africa
Chiyangi 1'; Bwalya 66' (pen.); Makwaza 71'

Independence Stadium, Lusaka
Attendance: 40,000
Referee: Ntambidila wa Ntambidila (Zaire)

25 July 1993

Zimbabwe	1–1	Zambia
McKop 28'		Bwalya 80'

Rufaro Stadium, Harare
Attendance: 60,000

25 July 1993

Mauritius	1–3	South Africa
Ithier 10'		Mosimane 31'; Augustine 33'; Masinga 70'

Sir Anerood Jugnauth Stadium, Belle Vue Maurel
Attendance: 18,000
Referee: Julio César M. (Mozambique)

=== Group 6 ===
Chad withdrew after competing two matches (lost both); their results were annulled and are not listed below.
Guinea and Burundi were tied; a play-off match was held in a neutral ground to determine who will qualify.

Team	Pld	W	D	L	GF	GA	GD	Pts
Guinea	4	1	3	0	5	4	+1	5
Burundi	4	1	3	0	5	4	+1	5
Congo	4	0	2	2	0	2	−2	2
Chad (W)	0	–	–	–	–	–	—	0

(W) Withdrew
16 August 1992

Burundi	1–0	Congo
Abdi 25'

Prince Louis Rwagasore Stadium, Bujumbura
Attendance: 12,000
Referee: Christopher Yolisichra-Musa (Uganda)
16 August 1992

Chad	0–3 Annulled	Guinea
		Oularé 10'; T. Camara 50'; F. Camara 85'

Stade Idriss Mahamat Ouya, N'Djamena

30 August 1992

Guinea	2–2	Burundi
F. Camara 43'; Oularé 44'		Nduwayo 7'; Mbuyi 44'

Stade du 28 Septembre, Conakry
Referee: Mohamed Bahar (Morocco)
30 August 1992

Congo	2–0 Annulled	Chad
Tchibota 49' (pen.); Younga-Mouhani 70'

Stade Alphonse Massemba-Débat, Brazzaville
Referee: Zeli Sinko (Ivory Coast)

11 April 1993

Guinea	1–0	Congo
Soumah 84'

Stade du 28 Septembre, Conakry
Attendance: 16,000

25 April 1993

Congo	0–0	Burundi

Stade Municipal, Pointe-Noire
Attendance: 4,000

11 July 1993

Burundi	2–2	Guinea
Ngando 16', 86' (pen.)		T. Camara 58'; Soumah 70'

Prince Louis Rwagasore Stadium, Bujumbura

15 August 1993

Congo	0–0	Guinea

Stade Municipal, Pointe-Noire
Attendance: 6,000

Play-off

24 October 1993

Burundi	0–0 (a.e.t.)	Guinea
Penalties
	4–5

Stade d'Angondjé, Libreville
Attendance: 15,000

=== Group 7 ===
Tanzania and Burkina Faso withdrew after competing two matches each; their results were annulled and are not listed below.

Team	Pld	W	D	L	GF	GA	GD	Pts
Ghana	2	2	0	0	3	0	+3	4
Liberia	2	0	0	2	0	3	−3	0
Tanzania (W)	0	–	–	–	–	–	—	0
Burkina Faso (W)	0	–	–	–	–	–	—	0

(W) Withdrew
15 August 1992

Burkina Faso	1–1 Annulled	Liberia
Bambara 58'		Traoré 30' (o.g.)

Stade du 4 Août, Ouagadougou
Referee: Gregorio Badupa (Sierra Leone)
15 August 1992

Tanzania	2–2 Annulled	Ghana
Bakari 35'; Mwamba 53'		Hasule 22' (o.g.); Zblade 70'

CCM Kirumba Stadium, Mwanza
Referee: Jonathan Gatera (Rwanda)

30 August 1992

Ghana	3–0 Annulled	Burkina Faso
Yeboah 2', 4'; Ahmed 84'

Accra Sports Stadium, Accra
Referee: Sylvain Abikanlou (Benin)
30 August 1992

Liberia	1–1 Annulled	Tanzania
Sebwe 52'		Holder 86'

Samuel Kanyon Doe Sports Complex, Monrovia
Referee: Emmanuel Obafemi (Nigeria)

10 April 1993

Ghana	1–0	Liberia
Manso 87'

Accra Sports Stadium, Accra
Attendance: 35,000

25 July 1993

Liberia	0–2	Ghana
		Yeboah; Abedi Pele

Samuel Kanyon Doe Sports Complex, Monrovia

=== Group 8 ===
Libya and Mauritania withdrew without playing any matches.

Team	Pld	W	D	L	GF	GA	GD	Pts
Mali	6	3	1	2	8	7	+1	7
Egypt	6	2	2	2	6	5	+1	6
Morocco	6	2	2	2	5	4	+1	6
Malawi	6	2	1	3	4	7	−3	5
Libya (W)	0	–	–	–	–	–	—	0
Mauritania (W)	0	–	–	–	–	–	—	0

(W) Withdrew
15 August 1992

Malawi	1–0	Egypt
Mtawali 81'

Lilongwe

29 August 1992

Malawi	1–1	Mali

Lilongwe

4 October 1992

Mali	2–1	Morocco
Traoré 40'; Cissé 54'		El Khalej 89'

Stade Modibo Keïta, Bamako
Referee: Idrissa Sarr (Mauritania)

8 November 1992

Morocco	0–0	Egypt

Stade Mohammed V, Casablanca

9 April 1993

Egypt	2–1	Mali
H. Hassan 14'; Ezzat 24'		Keita 47'

Cairo International Stadium, Cairo
11 April 1993

Morocco	0–1	Malawi
		Waya 89'

Moulay Abdellah Stadium, Rabat

23 April 1993

Egypt	2–0	Malawi
I. Hassan 45'; Rayyan 55'

Alexandria Stadium, Alexandria
25 April 1993

Morocco	1–0	Mali
Fertout 76'

Stade Mohammed V, Casablanca

11 July 1993

Egypt	1–1	Morocco
Ezzat 67'		Laghrissi 22'

Alexandria Stadium, Alexandria
11 July 1993

Mali	2–1	Malawi

Stade Modibo Keïta, Bamako

25 July 1993

Malawi	0–2	Morocco
		Sabek 33' (pen.); Rokbi 75'

Silver Stadium, Lilongwe
25 July 1993

Mali	2–1	Egypt
Traoré 39'; Sidibé 85' (pen.)		El-Kass 41'

Stade Modibo Keïta, Bamako

== Qualified teams ==
The 12 qualified teams are:

- Ivory Coast (holders)
- Egypt
- Gabon
- Ghana
- Guinea
- Mali
- Nigeria
- Senegal *
- Sierra Leone
- Tunisia (host)
- Zaire
- Zambia

* Senegal replaced Algeria (disqualified)
