= 1999–2000 Saudi Premier League =

Saudi Premier League
- Season: 1999–2000
- Champions: Al-Ittihad (4th title)
- Relegated: Al-Tai; Al-Raed
- Asian Club Championship: Al-Ittihad; Al-Hilal
- Top goalscorer: Hamzah Idris (33 goals)

Statistics of the 1999–2000 Saudi Premier League.

== Clubs ==
Locations of teams in the 1999-2000 Saudi Professional League

Club	Location	Stadium	Head coach
Al-Ahli	Jeddah	Prince Abdullah Al-Faisal Stadium	(Brazil) Zanata
Al-Ettifaq	Dammam	Prince Mohamed bin Fahd Stadium	(Colombia) César Maturana
Al-Hilal	Riyadh	King Fahd Stadium	(Romania) Anghel Iordănescu
Al-Ittihad	Jeddah	Prince Abdullah Al-Faisal Stadium	(Brazil) Oscar
Al-Najma	Unaizah	Department of Education Stadium	(Ukraine) Yuriy Sevastyanenko
Al-Nassr	Riyadh	King Fahd Stadium	(Federal Republic of Yugoslavia) Milan Živadinović
Al-Raed	Buraidah	King Abdullah Sport City Stadium	(Bosnia and Herzegovina) Senad Kreso
Al-Riyadh	Riyadh	King Fahd Stadium	
Al-Shabab	Riyadh	King Fahd Stadium	(Federal Republic of Yugoslavia) Đorđe Korać
Al-Tai	Ḥaʼil	Prince Abdul Aziz bin Musa'ed Stadium	(Romania) Ion Dumitru
Al-Wehda	Mecca	King Abdul Aziz Stadium	(Romania) Eugen Moldovan
Sdoos	Riyadh		

=== Foreign players ===
Club	Player 1	Player 2	Player 3	Player 4	Former players
Al-Ahli	(Brazil) Marcos Aurélio	(Colombia) Ricardo Pérez	(Mali) Mahamadou Sidibé	(Senegal) Abdoul Yoro N'Diaye	
Al-Ettifaq	(Kuwait) Faraj Laheeb				
Al-Hilal	(Brazil) Sérgio Ricardo	(Kuwait) Jasem Al-Huwaidi	(Nigeria) Ayuba Mbwas Mangut	(Zambia) Elijah Litana	(Brazil) Adriano Alves
Al-Ittihad	(Brazil) Gerson	(Italy) Roberto Donadoni	(Morocco) Redouane El Allaly	(Nigeria) Mutiu Adepoju	(Brazil) Darci
Al-Najma	(Ghana) Isaac Kwakye				
Al-Nassr	(Algeria) Moussa Saïb	(Brazil) Milson	(Morocco) Ahmed Bahja	(Morocco) Smahi Triki	(Peru) Álvaro Barco
Al-Raed	(Senegal) Ahmad Nan	(Senegal) Aly Male	(Senegal) Mody N'Diaye		
Al-Riyadh	(Senegal) Mamoun Diop	(Senegal) Moussa N'Daw			
Al-Shabab	(Mali) Yaya Dissa	(Morocco) Youssef Meriana			
Al-Tai	(Nigeria) Yaya Jaco				
Al-Wehda	(Algeria) Tarek Hadj Adlane	(Malawi) Ernest Mtawali			
Sdoos	(Senegal) Madu Job	(Senegal) Mohammed Manga			

== League table ==
Pos	Team	Pld	W	D	L	GF	GA	GD	Pts	Qualification or relegation
1	Al-Ittihad (C)	22	16	3	3	69	23	+46	51	Qualification to Asian Club Championship and Championship play-offs
2	Al-Ahli	22	15	6	1	64	20	+44	51	Qualification to Championship play-offs
3	Al-Shabab	22	14	4	4	37	22	+15	46	Qualification to Championship play-offs
4	Al-Nassr	22	13	6	3	31	18	+13	45	Qualification to Championship play-offs
5	Al-Hilal	22	11	6	5	39	19	+20	39	Qualification to Asian Club Championship (Note: Al-Hilal qualified for the Asian Club Championship as the 1999–2000 Asian Club Championship winners.)
6	Al-Riyadh	22	9	6	7	28	25	+3	33	
7	Al-Ettifaq	22	6	7	9	25	30	−5	25	
8	Al-Wehda	22	6	5	11	31	58	−27	23	
9	Al-Najma	22	6	1	15	18	46	−28	19	
10	Sdoos	22	4	3	15	18	36	−18	15	
11	Al-Raed	22	3	5	14	26	51	−25	14	Relegation to Saudi Second Division
12	Al-Tai	22	1	5	16	12	50	−38	8	Relegation to Saudi Second Division

(C) Champions

== Championship play-offs ==
=== Semi-finals ===
26 April 2000	Al-Nassr	0–0	Al-Ittihad	King Fahd Stadium, Riyadh
				Referee: Omer Al Mehannah

3 May 2000	Al-Ittihad	2–0	Al-Nassr	Prince Abdullah al-Faisal Stadium, Jeddah
	Tariq Al-Muwallad 37'; Hamzah Idris 90'			Referee: Yousef Al-Aqeely

Al-Ittihad won 2–0 on aggregate

27 April 2000	Al-Shabab	1–1	Al-Ahli	King Fahd Stadium, Riyadh
	Abdullah Al-Waked 64' (pen.)		85' Ricardo Pérez	Referee: Abdul Rahman Al-Zaid

4 May 2000	Al-Ahli	2–1	Al-Shabab	Prince Abdullah al-Faisal Stadium, Jeddah
	Talal Al-Meshal 25'; Talal Al-Meshal 81'		54' Abdullah Al-Waked	Referee: Mujib Al-Dosari

Al-Ahli won 3–2 on aggregate

=== Final ===
17 May 2000	Al-Ittihad	2–1 (a.e.t.)	Al-Ahli	Prince Abdullah al-Faisal Stadium, Jeddah
	Tariq Al-Muwallad 20'; Sulaiman Al-Hadaithy 101'		38' (pen.) Talal Al-Meshal	Attendance: 45,000; Referee: Ibrahim Al-Omar

Saudi Premier League
1999–00 winners

4th title
