= Mohamed Sesay =

Sierra Leonean footballer

Personal information
- Full name: Mohamed Sesay
- Date of birth: February 22, 1984 (age 42)
- Place of birth: Freetown, Sierra Leone
- Position: Right midfielder

Team information
- Current team: A.S.D. Tagliacozzo
- Number: 9

Youth career
- 2000–01: Kallon F.C.

Senior career*
Years	Team	Apps	(Gls)
2001–2002	Kallon F.C.	0	(0)
2002–2003	Milan	0	(0)
2002–2003	Monza	0	(0)
2003–2004	Sulmona	?	(5)
2004–2005	FC Francavilla (al Mare)	?	(6)
2005–2006	Atessa	0	(0)
2005–2006	Guardiagrele	28	(9)
2006–2007	Casoli	?	(24)
2007–2008	Polisportiva Cavaliere		
2008–2009	Rosetana		
2009–2010	Real Carsoli		
2016–	A.S.D. Tagliacozzo	11	(11)

International career
2007–2009	Sierra Leone		
- * Club domestic league appearances and goals

Mohamed Sesay (born February 22, 1984, in Freetown, Sierra Leone) is a Sierra Leonean international footballer, who currently plays for A.S.D. Tagliacozzo.

== International ==
In 2007 national team coach John Sherington called on Sesay to play for Sierra Leone, in the qualification matches for the African Cup of Nations, first on 12 October against Benin, and on 17 October against Guinea-Bissau.

== Privates ==
Sesay is the cousin of Mohamed Kallon.
