= Papa N'Diaye =

Papa N'Diaye can refer to:

- Papa Waly N'Diaye
- Papa M'Baye N'Diaye
