= Christian Cole =

Sierra Leonean football coach

Personal information
- Place of birth: Sierra Leone

Managerial career
- Years: Team
- 1989: Sierra Leone
- 1991: Sierra Leone
- 2001: Sierra Leone
- Mighty Blackpool
- 2010–2011: Sierra Leone

Christian Cole is a Sierra Leonean football coach.

== Career ==
Cole has had four spells in charge of the national team.

In January 2011, Minister of Employment, Youth and Sports Paul Kamara removed Cole from the managership, replacing him with Swedish coach Lars-Olof Mattsson. The incident sparked a feud between Kamara's ministry and the SLFA, which preferred Cole.
