= List of rulers of the Ngoni dynasty of Jere (Qeko) =

This is a list of rulers of the Ngoni dynasty.

== Jere, (Qeko), (Malawi) and (Tanzania) ==
Jere Dynasty (Qeko dynasty) (Ngoni Dynasty)

| Term | Incumbent | Notes |
|---|---|---|
Inkosi ya makosi (Paramount Chief)
| 1840 to 1848 | Zwangendaba a Hlatshwayo, Inkosi ya makosi |
| 1848 to 1850 | Ntabeni, Regent |
| 1850 to 1854 | Mgayi, Regent |
| 1854 to 1857 | Gwaza Jere, Regent |
| 1857 to 1891 | Mmbelwa I, Inkosi ya makosi |
| 1891 to 1896 | Mwamba, Regent |
| 1896 to 1915 | Cimtunga, Inkosi ya makosi |
| 1915 to 1928 | Interregnum |
| 1928 to 1959 | Mmbelwa II, Inkosi ya makosi |
| 1958 to 1984 | Mmbelwa III, Inkosi ya makosi |
| 1984 to 2013 | Mmbelwa IV, Inkosi ya makosi |
| 2014 to 2017 | Mperella I, Inkosi ya makosi |
| 2017 to present | Mperella II, Inkosi ya makosi |
