= Mohamed Brahimi =

Mohamed Brahimi may refer to:

- Mohamed Brahimi (footballer, born 1970), Algerian footballer
- Mohamed Brahimi (footballer, born 1998), French footballer
