= Mangane =

Mangane is a surname. Notable people with the surname include:

- Kader Mangane (born 1983), Senegalese footballer
- Mame Birame Mangane (born 1969), Senegalese footballer
- Moktar Mangane (born 1982), Senegalese footballer
