= Zakari Junior Lambo =

Belgian-Nigerien footballer

Personal information
- Date of birth: 19 January 1999 (age 27)
- Place of birth: Aalst, Belgium
- Height: 1.78 m (5 ft 10 in)
- Position: Winger

Team information
- Current team: Heist
- Number: 19

Youth career
- 2015–2016: Mouscron
- 2016–2017: Ronse

Senior career*
Years	Team	Apps	(Gls)
2017–2018	Ronse	29	(6)
2018–2019	Winkel	28	(8)
2019–2020	Ronse	18	(8)
2020–2022	Knokke	26	(11)
2022–2023	La Louvière	23	(7)
2023–2025	Lokeren-Temse	28	(2)
2025–	Heist	12	(3)

International career^{‡}
2021–	Niger	11	(1)
- * Club domestic league appearances and goals as of 23 November 2025 ‡ National team caps and goals as of 16:58, 25 December 2024 (UTC)

Zakari Junior Lambo (born 19 January 1999) is a professional footballer who plays as a winger for Belgian Division 2 club Heist. Born in Belgium, he represents the Niger national team.

== Career ==
A youth product of Mouscron and Ronse, Lambo began his career with the semi-pro side Ronse. He transferred to Winkel in 2018, before returning to Ronse the following year. On 5 April 2020, Lambo signed a 2-year contract with Knokke.

In the summer 2022, Lambo joined La Louvière. A year later, he moved to Lokeren-Temse.

== International career ==
Lambo was born in Belgium to a Nigerien father and Burkinabé mother, and holds all three passports. He was called up to represent the Niger national team for a set of friendlies in June 2021. He debuted with Niger in a 2–0 friendly loss to the Gambia on 5 June 2021.

== Personal life ==
Lambo is the son of the former Nigerien international footballer Zakari Lambo.
