= Musa Kanu =

Sierra Leonean footballer

Personal information
- Date of birth: 4 March 1976 (age 50)
- Height: 1.69 m (5 ft 7 in)
- Position: Midfielder

Senior career*
Years	Team	Apps	(Gls)
1992–1998	K.S.C. Lokeren	114	(14)
1999–2003	HSV Hoek		
- Berchem Sport

International career
1994–2002	Sierra Leone		
- * Club domestic league appearances and goals

Musa Kanu (born 4 March 1976) is a retired Sierra Leonean football midfielder. He was a squad member for the 1994 and 1996 African Cup of Nations.
