= Aly Kaba =

Guinean politician

Deputy in the National Assembly (Guinea)
- President: Alpha Conde
- Constituency: Kouroussa
- Preceded by: Famako Mamady Camara

President of the Group of the Presidential Majority
- In office 22 April 2020 – 5 September 2021
- Preceded by: Amadou Damaro Camara

Personal details
- Party: Rally of the Guinean People
- Education: École Primaire El hadj Oumar Tall, Lycée Amilcar Cabral
- Alma mater: Julius Nyerere University of Kankan

Aly Kaba is a Guinean politician who represents the constituency of Kouroussa, in the National Assembly (Guinea). He is the President of the Majority Rally of the Guinean People Party of former president Alpha Conde.
