= Brima George =

Sierra Leonean footballer

Personal information
- Date of death: 20 February 2013
- Position: Forward

Senior career*
| Years | Team | Apps | (Gls) |
- Diamond Stars

International career
| 1994 | Sierra Leone | 1 | (0) |
- * Club domestic league appearances and goals

Brima George (died 20 February 2013) was a Sierra Leonean footballer who played as a forward. He made one appearance for the Sierra Leone national team in 1994. He was also named in Sierra Leone's squad for the 1994 African Cup of Nations tournament. George died in poverty, after suffering from mental illness for more than a decade.
