= Mwamba =

Mwamba is an African given name. Notable people with the name include:

- Mwamba Luchembe (born 1960), Zambian politician
- Alexis Thambwe Mwamba (born 1943), Congolese politician
- Anthony Mwamba (1960–2021), Zambian boxer
- Bertin Mwamba (born 1932), Congolese politician
- Christopher Mwamba, Zambian boxer
- Emmanuel Mwamba (born 1971), Zambian diplomat
- Félix Mwamba Musasa (born 1976), Congolese football player
- Geoffrey Bwalya Mwamba (born 1959), Zambian businessman and politician
- Godfrey Mwamba (born 1950), Zambian boxer
- Kazadi Mwamba (1947–1998), Zambian goalkeeper
- Kongolo Mwamba, first king of the Luba Empire
- Martin Mwamba (born 1964), Zambian footballer
- Meji Mwamba (born 1959), Democratic Republic of the Congo boxer
- Mmasekgoa Masire-Mwamba, Botswana women politician
- Patrick Mwamba (born 1964), Zambian boxer
- Rémy Mwamba (1921–1967), Congolese politician
- Trevor Mwamba (born 1958), Anglican bishop of Botswana

== See also ==
- Muamba (disambiguation), includes a list of people with the name Muamba
