= Chikondi Banda =

Malawian footballer

Personal information
- Date of birth: 28 December 1979
- Date of death: 8 August 2013 (aged 33)
- Position: Midfielder

Senior career*
Years	Team	Apps	(Gls)
1999–2006	Big Bullets		
2007	Michiru Castles		

International career
2000–2001	Malawi	7	(1)
- * Club domestic league appearances and goals

Chikondi Banda (28 December 1979 – 8 August 2013) was a Malawian international footballer who played as a midfielder.

== Career ==
Banda played club football for Big Bullets and Michiru Castles.

He made his international debut for Malawi in 2000, earning a total of 7 caps, including appearing in one FIFA World Cup qualifying match.

== Illness and death ==
Banda died on 8 August 2013, due to cerebral malaria, aged 33.

== Personal life ==
He is the father of the footballer Peter Banda.
