= Parfait Ndong =

Gabonese footballer

Personal information
- Full name: Parfait Juste Nguema Ndong
- Date of birth: 23 July 1973 (age 53)
- Place of birth: Ndjolé, Gabon
- Height: 1.80 m (5 ft 11 in)
- Position: Defender

Senior career*
Years	Team	Apps	(Gls)
- Petrosport
- Mbilinga
1994-1995	Amora	21	(1)
1995-1996	Maia	22	(1)
1996-1998	Chaves	17	(1)
1998	Penafiel	2	(0)

International career
1991-1997	Gabon	33	(1)
- * Club domestic league appearances and goals

Parfait Justé Nguema Ndong (born 23 July 1973) is a Gabonese former professional footballer who played as a defender.

== Career ==
In 1995, Ndong signed for Portuguese third division side Maia from Amora in the Portuguese second division.

In 1996, he signed for Portuguese top flight club Chaves. While playing for Gabon, Ndong suffered a fractured knee, causing him to retire from professional football, before joining a team in the Swiss lower leagues.
