= Muamba =

Muamba may refer to:

- Muamba (stew) or Moambe, ingredient in stews and sauces in African cuisine

== People ==
- Artyom Ntumba Muamba (born 1993), Russian footballer
- Cauchy Muamba (born 1987), Canadian football player
- Fabrice Muamba, England footballer
- Hénoc Muamba, Canadian football player
- Loick Pires, Portuguese footballer

== See also ==
- Mwamba, given name and surname
