= Michiru Castles FC =

Michiru Castles
- Full name: Michiru Castles
- Nickname(s): Hardware Stars
- Ground: Kamuzu Stadium; Blantyre
- Capacity: 50,000
- League: TNM Super League

Michiru Castles are a Malawian football (soccer) club based in Blantyre. The club plays in the Malawi Second Division.

In 1977 the team won the TNM Super League.

== Achievements ==
- Malawi Premiere Division: 1

1977

== Performance in CAF competitions ==
- CAF Champions League: 1 appearance

1978 African Cup of Champions Clubs – Preliminary Round

== Notable players ==
- (Malawi) Chikondi Banda
- (Malawi) Ernest Mtawali
