= Ibrahim Koroma (footballer, born 1973) =

Sierra Leonean footballer

Personal information
- Date of birth: 4 July 1973 (age 53)
- Position: Defender

Senior career*
Years	Team	Apps	(Gls)
1991–1995	K. Boom		

International career
1993–2000	Sierra Leone	9	(2)
- * Club domestic league appearances and goals

Ibrahim Koroma (born 4 July 1973) is a Sierra Leonean footballer who played as a defender. He played for K. Boom between 1991 and 1995. He also played in nine matches for the Sierra Leone national football team from 1993 to 2000. He was also named in Sierra Leone's squad for the 1994 African Cup of Nations tournament.
