= Brima Kamara (footballer) =

Sierra Leonean footballer (1972–1999)

Personal information
- Date of birth: 5 May 1972
- Date of death: 7 July 1999 (aged 27)
- Position: Goalkeeper

Senior career*
Years	Team	Apps	(Gls)
1994–1996	East End Lions		
1997–1999	El Mansoura		

International career
1994–1997	Sierra Leone		
- * Club domestic league appearances and goals

Brima Kamara (5 May 1972 – 7 July 1999) was a Sierra Leonean professional footballer who played as a goalkeeper. He was a squad member for the 1994 and 1996 African Cup of Nations.
