= Mariama Kesso Diallo =

Guinean writer living in Switzerland

Mariama Kesso Diallo is a Guinean writer living in Switzerland.

Diallo graduated from the University of Kankan and the University of Geneva. In 2000 she published the autobiographical novel La chance, describing her escape from Guinea with her children in 1977. Long resident in Geneva, she has worked as a sociologist and a consultant for UNESCO and other international organizations.
