= Sita Camara =

Guinean footballer

Personal information
- Date of birth: 11 March 1974 (age 52)
- Position: Defender

College career
Years	Team	Apps	(Gls)
1994	University of Kankan		

Senior career*
Years	Team	Apps	(Gls)
1999–2002	El Qanah		(4)

International career
1994–1996	Guinea	3	(0)
- * Club domestic league appearances and goals

Sita Camara (born 11 March 1974) is a Guinean footballer who played as a defender. He played in three matches for the Guinea national football team from 1994 to 1996. He was also named in Guinea's squad for the 1994 African Cup of Nations tournament.
