= Guy Roger Nzamba =

Gabonese footballer

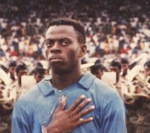

Personal information
- Full name: Guy Roger Nzamba
- Date of birth: 13 July 1970 (age 56)
- Place of birth: Port Gentil, Gabon
- Height: 1.75 m (5 ft 9 in)
- Position: Forward

Senior career*
Years	Team	Apps	(Gls)
1986	AS Sogara		
1987–1988	Petro Sport		
1989–1990	AS Sogara		
1990–1995	Auxerre B	46	(14)
1992–1993	Auxerre	1	(0)
1993–1994	→ Mulhouse	22	(3)
1994–1995	→ Angers	13	(1)
1995	Orlando Pirates		
1996	FC 105 Libreville		
1996–1997	Triestina	13	(2)
1997–1998	Southend United	1	(0)
1999–2001	KV Kortrijk		

International career
1988–2000	Gabon	52	(21)
- * Club domestic league appearances and goals

Guy Roger Nzamba (born 13 July 1970) is a Gabonese former professional footballer, who played as a forward. He represented the Gabon national team between 1988 and 2000, scoring 21 goals in 52 matches.

== Career ==
Nzamba made his debut in the Football League for Southend United on 20 September 1997, at home to Fulham in a 1–0 victory. He came on as a substitute in the 40th minute for Paul Williams before being substituted himself in the 65th minute by Carl Beeston.

He also represented the Gabon national team on a number of occasions.

== Career statistics ==
Scores and results list Gabon's goal tally first, score column indicates score after each Nzamba goal.

List of international goals scored by Guy Roger Nzamba
No.	Date	Venue	Opponent	Score	Result	Competition	Ref.
1	24 November 1998	Stade Omar Bongo, Libreville, Gabon	Mali	4–0	4–0	Friendly	
2	4 December 1998	Ahmadou Ahidjo Stadium, Yaoundé, Cameroon	Equatorial Guinea	2–0	3–0	1988 UDEAC Cup	
3	8 December 1998	Ahmadou Ahidjo Stadium, Yaoundé, Cameroon	Cameroon	1–0	1–0	1988 UDEAC Cup	
4	14 April 1991	Stade Tata Raphaël, Kinshasa, Democratic Republic of Congo	Zaire	1–1	1–2	1992 African Cup of Nations qualification	
5	30 August 1992	Stade Général Seyni Kountché, Niamey, Niger	Niger	1–0	3–1	1994 African Cup of Nations qualification	
6	30 August 1992	Stade Général Seyni Kountché, Niamey, Niger	Niger	2–0	3–1	1994 African Cup of Nations qualification	
7	30 August 1992	Stade Général Seyni Kountché, Niamey, Niger	Niger	3–1	3–1	1994 African Cup of Nations qualification	
8	11 October 1992	Stade Omar Bongo, Libreville, Gabon	Mozambique	1–0	3–1	1994 FIFA World Cup qualification	
9	11 October 1992	Stade Omar Bongo, Libreville, Gabon	Mozambique	2–1	3–1	1994 FIFA World Cup qualification	
10	19 December 1992	Stade Omar Bongo, Libreville, Gabon	Senegal	2–1	3–2	1994 FIFA World Cup qualification	
11	17 January 1993	Estádio da Machava, Maputo, Mozambique	Mozambique	1–0	1–1	1994 FIFA World Cup qualification	
12	11 July 1993	Stade Omar Bongo, Libreville, Gabon	Niger	2–0	3–0	1994 African Cup of Nations qualification	
13	25 July 1993	Stade de l'Amitié, Cotonou, Benin	Benin	1–1	2–1	1994 African Cup of Nations qualification	
14	25 July 1993	Stade de l'Amitié, Cotonou, Benin	Benin	2–1	2–1	1994 African Cup of Nations qualification	
15	20 November 1994	Stade Omar Bongo, Libreville, Gabon	Zambia	2–0	2–1	1996 African Cup of Nations qualification	
16	30 November 1995	Stade Omar Bongo, Libreville, Gabon	Algeria	1–1	2–1	Friendly	
17	22 December 1995	Stade du 4 Août, Ouagadougou, Burkina Faso	Burkina Faso	1–1	5–2	Friendly	
18	22 December 1995	Stade du 4 Août, Ouagadougou, Burkina Faso	Burkina Faso	2–1	5–2	Friendly	
19	22 December 1995	Stade du 4 Août, Ouagadougou, Burkina Faso	Burkina Faso	4–2	5–2	Friendly	
20	27 December 1995	Stade Modibo Kéïta, Bamako, Mali	Mali	2–0	2–1	Friendly	
