= Lars-Olof Mattsson =

Swedish football coach

Personal information
- Date of birth: 13 November 1954 (age 71)
- Place of birth: Köla, Sweden

Senior career*
Years	Team	Apps	(Gls)
- Köla AIK
- IFK Arvika
- IF Olsfors
- Mariestads BK
- Torsby IF
- Köla AIK

Managerial career
- 1987: Gimo
- 1988: Säffle
- 1990–1991: Oddevold
- 1993: Degerfors IF
- 1994–1995: Fredrikstad
- 1996–1997: Ljungskile
- 1998–1999: Sweden U21
- 2001–2002: Västra Frölunda
- 2003–2004: Moss
- 2005: FK Tønsberg
- 2006: Ljungskile
- 2007–2010: FC Trollhättan
- 2011–2013: Sierra Leone
- 2014–2015: Oddevold
- 2017–2018: Ljungskile
- * Club domestic league appearances and goals

Lars-Olof Mattsson (born 13 November 1954) is a Swedish football coach and former player.

== Career ==
Mattsson played for Köla AIK, IFK Arvika, IF Olsfors, Mariestads BK and Torsby IF.

He previously coached clubs in Sweden and Norway, such as Gimo IF, Säffle FF, IK Oddevold, Degerfors IF, Fredrikstad FK, Ljungskile SK, Sweden under-21 team, Västra Frölunda IF, Moss FK, FK Tønsberg and FC Trollhättan.

Mattsson took charge of the Sierra Leone national team in January 2011, and in March of that year publicly expressed a desire to remain in the job once his one-match contract expired. In April 2011, Mattsson's contract was extended until the end of the 2012 Africa Cup of Nations qualifying campaign. However, Mattsson, who was appointed by the Sports Ministry, was not recognised by the Sierra Leone Football Association, until a meeting between the two organisations confirmed Mattsson's role as manager.

Mattsson was awarded a full-time contract in May 2012.

On 28 March 2013, Mattsson quit his job as manager of the Sierra Leone national team, and announced he wanted to take a break from football. However, the Sierra Leone Football Association denied knowledge of the resignation.

In 2019, Mattson was appointed to the coaching staff of Lillestrøm SK.
