= Osaid Marah =

Sierra Leonean footballer

Personal information
- Date of birth: 26 May 1960 (age 66)
- Position: Goalkeeper

Senior career*
Years	Team	Apps	(Gls)
c. 1993–1996	K.V.K. Tienen		

International career
1994–1996	Sierra Leone		
- * Club domestic league appearances and goals

Osaid Marah (born 26 May 1960) is a retired Sierra Leonean football goalkeeper. He was a squad member for the 1994 and 1996 African Cup of Nations.
