= François Amégasse =

Gabonese footballer

Personal information
- Full name: François Amégasse Akol
- Date of birth: 10 October 1965 (age 61)
- Position: Defender

Senior career*
Years	Team	Apps	(Gls)
1983–1988	AS Sogara		
1993–1997	Mbilinga FC		
1999–2000	Petrosport		

International career
1984–2000	Gabon	110	(9)
- * Club domestic league appearances and goals

François Amégasse Akol (born 10 October 1965) is a Gabonese former footballer who played as a defender. He was capped 110 times by the Gabon national team, scoring nine goals, and represented Gabon at the 1994, 1996 and 2000 African Cup of Nations. Amégasse captained Gabon at the 2000 African Cup of Nations finals.

After he retired from playing, Amégasse continued to be involved in football. He was named an ambassador to the 2017 Africa Cup of Nations finals in Gabon.

== See also ==
- List of men's footballers with 100 or more international caps
