= John Sherington =

Sierra Leonean football manager

Personal information
- Full name: John Jebbor Sherington
- Date of birth: 1952 (age 73–74)

International career
Years	Team	Apps	(Gls)
1972	Sierra Leone	?	(?)

Managerial career
- 1996–97: Sierra Leone
- 2003–06: Sierra Leone
- 2015: Sierra Leone

John Jebbor Sherington (sometimes spelt as John Sherrington or Jeboh Sherrington) is a former head coach of the Sierra Leone national football team.

== Career ==
As a player, he represented Sierra Leone in the 1974 FIFA World Cup qualification campaign, playing against Ivory Coast in October 1972.

In 1996-1997 and from 2003 to 2007, Sherington was the head coach of the Sierra Leone. He was an assistant to Brazilian José Antonio Nogueira from 1997 to 2003. He was sacked in October 2007.

He was appointed as national team coach in June 2015.
