= Happy Sichikolo =

Zambian footballer (born 1973)

Personal information
- Date of birth: 22 November 1973 (age 52)
- Place of birth: Kabwe, Zambia
- Position: Midfielder

International career
Years	Team	Apps	(Gls)
1994	Zambia	5	(0)

Happy Sichikolo (born 22 November 1973) is a Zambian footballer. He played in five matches for the Zambia national football team in 1994. He was also named in Zambia's squad for the 1994 African Cup of Nations tournament.
