= Francis Ntumba Danga =

Congolese footballer

Personal information
- Date of birth: 27 July 1963 (age 63)
- Position: Defender

Senior career*
Years	Team	Apps	(Gls)
1993–1994	K.F.C. Lommel S.K.		
1995–1996	Brest		

International career
- DR Congo
- * Club domestic league appearances and goals

Francis Ntumba Danga (born 27 July 1963) is a Congolese former professional footballer who played as a defender. He was a squad member of the DR Congo national team at the 1994 and 1996 Africa Cup of Nations.
