= Kingsley Musabula =

Zambian footballer (born 1973)

Personal information
- Date of birth: 26 December 1973 (age 52)

International career
Years	Team	Apps	(Gls)
1994–2000	Zambia	12	(0)

Kingsley Musabula (born 26 December 1973) is a Zambian footballer. He played in 12 matches for the Zambia national football team from 1994 to 2000. He was also named in Zambia's squad for the 1994 African Cup of Nations tournament.
