= Kubu Lembi =

Congolese footballer

- Lembi with Royal Antwerp in 1997

Personal information
- Full name: Victor Kubu Lembi
- Date of birth: 19 August 1972 (age 54)
- Place of birth: Kinshasa
- Position: Midfielder

Senior career*
Years	Team	Apps	(Gls)
1988–1991	DC Motema Pembe		
1991–1993	Sporting Lokeren		
1993–1995	Royal Antwerp F.C.		
1995–1997	K.S.V. Waregem		
1997–1999	Royal Antwerp F.C.		
1999–2001	HSV Hoek		
2001–2002	Dunaferr SE		

International career
- DR Congo
- * Club domestic league appearances and goals

Kubu Lembi (born 19 August 1972) is a retired Congolese football midfielder. He was a squad member at the 1994 Africa Cup of Nations.
