= Harrison Tembo =

Zambian footballer (born 1969)

Personal information
- Date of birth: 21 January 1969 (age 57)

International career
Years	Team	Apps	(Gls)
1994–1998	Zambia	5	(0)

Harrison Tembo (born 21 January 1969) is a Zambian footballer. He played in five matches for the Zambia national football team from 1994 to 1998. He was also named in Zambia's squad for the 1994 African Cup of Nations tournament.
