= Stanley Nduwayo =

Burundian footballer

Stanley Nduwayo nicknamed "Maradona" is a former international attacking midfielder player from Burundi. He played for Vital'O and lost the 1992 African Cup Winners' Cup.

Nduwayo played for the Burundi national football team, including appearing in qualifying matches for the 1998 FIFA World Cup.

He was notorious for his ability to score on free kicks and was known for his technical abilities.

== See also ==
- Football in Burundi
- List of football clubs in Burundi
