= Radhouane Salhi =

Tunisian footballer

Personal information
- Full name: Radhouane Salhi
- Date of birth: 18 December 1967 (age 58)
- Place of birth: Sousse, Tunisia
- Height: 1.86 m (6 ft 1 in)
- Position: Goalkeeper

Senior career*
Years	Team	Apps	(Gls)
1986–2001	Étoile du Sahel	201	(0)

International career
1994–2000	Tunisia	9	(0)
- * Club domestic league appearances and goals

Radhouane Salhi (Arabic: رضوان صالحي) (born 18 December 1967) is a former Tunisian footballer who played as a goalkeeper for the national team. He spent his entire 15-year career at Étoile du Sahel.

== International career ==
Salhi made his debut for the Tunisia national football team in December 1994 against Algeria and was named in squad for the 1998 FIFA World Cup, without playing any matches. His last international match was a friendly match against Togo in January 2000, coming off the bench to replace Chokri El Ouaer.

== Honours ==
Étoile du Sahel

- Tunisian Ligue: 1986, 1987, 1997
- Tunisian President Cup: 1996
- Tunisian Super Cup: 1986, 1987
- African Cup Winners' Cup: 1997
- CAF Cup: 1995, 1999
- African Super Cup: 1998
