= Ibrahim Sory Touré =

Malian footballer

Personal information
- Date of birth: 15 September 1970
- Date of death: 21 October 1996 (aged 26)

International career
Years	Team	Apps	(Gls)
1994	Mali	3	(0)

Ibrahim Sory Touré (15 September 1970 – 21 October 1996) was a Malian footballer. He played in three matches for the Mali national football team in 1994. He was also named in Mali's squad for the 1994 African Cup of Nations tournament.
