= Issa Tambedou =

Senegalese footballer

Personal information
- Date of birth: 28 September 1966 (age 60)
- Position: Defender

Senior career*
Years	Team	Apps	(Gls)
1992–1994	Port Autonome		

International career
1992–1995	Senegal	13	(0)
- * Club domestic league appearances and goals

Issa Tambedou (born 28 September 1966) is a Senegalese footballer who played as a defender. He played in 13 matches for the Senegal national football team from 1992 to 1995. He was also named in Senegal's squad for the 1994 African Cup of Nations tournament.
