= Placide Nyangala =

Gabonese footballer

Personal information
- Date of birth: 30 December 1967 (age 58)

Senior career*
Years	Team	Apps	(Gls)
1985–1986	FC 105 Libreville		
1986–1989	AS Nancy Lorraine	2	(0)
1989–1990	SAS Épinal	28	(0)
1990–1992	US Orléans	27	(0)
1992–1994	Aurillac FCA		
1994–1995	SV Stockerau		
1995–1996	RC Lons-le-Saunier		
1996–1997	FC Lorient		

International career
1994	Gabon	2	(0)
- * Club domestic league appearances and goals

Placide Nyangala (born 30 December 1967) is a Gabonese footballer. Besides Gabon, he has played in France, Austria, and Saudi Arabia. He played in two matches for the Gabon national football team in 1994. He was also named in Gabon's squad for the 1994 African Cup of Nations tournament.
