= Mounkaïla Idé Barkiré =

Nigerien footballer

Personal information
- Full name: Mounkaïla Garike Idé Barkiré
- Date of birth: 19 January 1972 (age 54)
- Place of birth: Niger
- Height: 1.92 m (6 ft 4 in)
- Position: Striker

Senior career*
Years	Team	Apps	(Gls)
1996	Sahel SC		
1997–1998	Hutnik Kraków	10	(3)
1999	Africa Sports d'Abidjan		

International career
1992–1998	Niger	13	(7)
- * Club domestic league appearances and goals

Mounkaïla Garike Idé Barkiré (born 19 January 1972), also known by his nickname Bappa, is a Nigerien former professional footballer who played as a striker. From 1992 to 1998, he scored seven goals in thirteen matches for the Niger national team.

== Honours ==
Sahel SC

- Ligue 1 (Niger): 1996

Africa Sports d'Abidjan

- Ligue 1 (Ivory Coast): 1999
