= Mariestads BK =

Swedish football club

- Full name: Mariestads Bollklubb
- Nickname: MBK or Bollis
- Founded: July 3rd 1929
- Ground: Vänershofs IP; Mariestad; Sweden
- Chairman: Örjan Johansson
- Coach: Per-Arne Lundkvist
- League: Division 5 Västergötland Norra
- 2010: Division 5 Västergötland Norra, 3rd
Home colours	Away colours

Mariestads BK is a Swedish football club located in Mariestad, currently playing in Division 5 Västergötland Norra.

== Background ==
Mariestads Bollklubb was formed in July 1929 by Alla Lindqvist. The club name is often abbreviated as MBK or nicknamed "Bollis". The club has a loyal fan base, with the most famous grouping being known as Bollis Trogna (BT) – which translates as "Loyal Bollis".

Since their foundation Mariestads BK has participated mainly in the middle and lower divisions of the Swedish football league system. The club currently plays in Division 5 Västergötland Norra which is the seventh tier of Swedish football. They play their home matches at the Vänershofs IP in Mariestad.

Mariestads BK are affiliated to Västergötlands Fotbollförbund. The other main club in the town is IFK Mariestad and the rivalry is enormous. The activity and support in the Mariestads BK fan base has later diminished due to an increased number of police arrests and charges.

== Recent history ==
In recent seasons Mariestads BK have competed in the following divisions:

2011 – Division V, Västergötland Norra
2010 – Division V, Västergötland Norra
2009 – Division V, Västergötland Norra
2008 – Division V, Västergötland Norra
2007 – Division IV, Västergötland Norra
2006 – Division V, Västergötland Norra
2005 – Division IV, Västergötland Norra
2004 – Division IV, Västergötland Norra
2003 – Division IV, Västergötland Norra
2002 – Division IV, Västergötland Norra
2001 – Division IV, Västergötland Norra
2000 – Division IV, Västergötland Norra
1999 – Division IV, Västergötland Norra

== Attendances ==
In recent seasons Mariestads BK have had the following average attendances:

Season	Average attendance	Division / Section	Level
2009	Not available	Div 5 Västergötland Norra	Tier 7
2010	111	Div 5 Västergötland Norra	Tier 7

* Attendances are provided in the Publikliga sections of the Svenska Fotbollförbundet website.
