= Souleymane Sangaré =

Malian footballer (born 1969)

Personal information
- Date of birth: 20 August 1969 (age 57)
- Position: Centre-back

Senior career*
Years	Team	Apps	(Gls)
1992–1994	Real Bamako		
1994–?	Aswan SC		
- Dina Farms

International career
1994–1999	Mali	11	(0)
- * Club domestic league appearances and goals

Souleymane Sangaré (born 20 August 1969) is a Malian former professional footballer who played as a centre-back. He made eleven appearances for the Mali national team from 1994 to 1999. He was also named in Mali's squad for the 1994 African Cup of Nations tournament.
