= Yacouba Komara =

Ivorian footballer

Personal information
- Date of birth: 8 January 1971 (age 55)

International career
Years	Team	Apps	(Gls)
1990–1999	Ivory Coast	12	(1)

Yacouba Komara (born 8 January 1971) is an Ivorian footballer. He played in 12 matches for the Ivory Coast national football team from 1990 to 1999. He was also named in Ivory Coast's squad for the 1994 African Cup of Nations tournament.
