= Amidu Karim =

Sierra Leonean footballer

Personal information
- Date of birth: 10 October 1974 (age 52)
- Position: Forward

Senior career*
Years	Team	Apps	(Gls)
1993–1994	Mighty Blackpool		
1994–1997	Gomhoriat Shebin		
1997–2002	Ghazl Suez		

International career
1994–1997	Sierra Leone		

Managerial career
- 2017–2023: Sierra Leone (assistant coach)
- 2023–2025: Sierra Leone
- * Club domestic league appearances and goals

Amidu Karim (born 10 October 1974) is a Sierra Leonean football coach and a former striker who is the manager of the Sierra Leone national football team. He was a squad member for the 1994 and 1996 African Cup of Nations.

== Managerial record ==
As of match played 19 November 2024

Managerial record by team and tenure
Team	Nat	From	To	Record					Ref.
Team	Nat	From	To	G	W	D	L	Win %	Ref.
Sierra Leone		October 2023	January 2025	14	4	4	6	28.57	
Career Total				14	4	4	6	28.57	—
