= Abdoulaye Traoré (Malian footballer) =

Malian footballer

Personal information
- Date of birth: 13 August 1970 (age 56)

International career
Years	Team	Apps	(Gls)
1993–1995	Mali	10	(0)

Abdoulaye Traoré (born 13 August 1970) is a Malian footballer.

== Career ==
He played in ten matches for the Mali national football team from 1993 to 1995. He was also named in Mali's squad for the 1994 African Cup of Nations tournament.
