= Claude Babé =

Gabonese footballer

Personal information
- Date of birth: 17 January 1970 (age 56)

International career
Years	Team	Apps	(Gls)
1994–2001	Gabon	14	(0)

Claude Babé (born 17 January 1970) is a Gabonese footballer. He played in 14 matches for the Gabon national football team from 1994 to 2001. He was also named in Gabon's squad for the 1994 African Cup of Nations tournament.
