= Mohamed Ofei Sylla =

Guinean footballer (1974–2019)

Personal information
- Full name: Mohamed Ofei Sylla
- Date of birth: 15 August 1974
- Place of birth: Guinea
- Date of death: 4 February 2019 (aged 44)
- Place of death: Conakry
- Position: Midfielder

Senior career*
Years	Team	Apps	(Gls)
1993–1994	Vannes OC		
1997–1998	Ismaily SC		
1999–2000	Gaziantepspor	23	(0)
2000–2001	Denizlispor	6	(0)

International career
1993–1999	Guinea	22	(0)
- * Club domestic league appearances and goals

Mohamed Ofei Sylla (15 August 1974 – 4 February 2019) was a Guinean professional footballer who played as a midfielder.

== Club career ==
Sylla played in the Turkish Super Lig for Gaziantepspor and Denizlispor.

== International career ==
Sylla played for the Guinea national football team, including appearing at the finals of the 1994 African Nations Cup and 1998 African Nations Cup.

== Later life and death ==
Sylla died on 4 February 2019, aged 44, following a short illness.
