= Thierry Retoa =

Gabonese footballer

Personal information
- Date of birth: 21 November 1971 (age 54)

International career
| Years | Team | Apps | (Gls) |
| 1993–1995 | Gabon | 8 | (1) |

Thierry Retoa (born 21 November 1971) is a Gabonese footballer. He played in eight matches for the Gabon national football team from 1993 to 1995. He was also named in Gabon's squad for the 1994 African Cup of Nations tournament.
