= Demba N'Diaye =

Malian footballer

Personal information
- Date of birth: 26 October 1969 (age 57)

International career
Years	Team	Apps	(Gls)
1994	Mali	3	(0)

Demba N'Diaye (born 26 October 1969) is a Malian footballer. He played in three matches for the Mali national football team in 1994. He was also named in Mali's squad for the 1994 African Cup of Nations tournament.
