= Francis Koumba =

Gabonese footballer

Personal information
- Date of birth: 16 July 1970 (age 56)
- Place of birth: Libreville, Gabon

International career
Years	Team	Apps	(Gls)
1993–2002	Gabon	43	(0)

Francis Koumba (born 16 July 1970) is a Gabonese footballer. He played in 43 matches for the Gabon national football team from 1993 to 2002. He was also named in Gabon's squad for the 1994 African Cup of Nations tournament.
