= Sékou Sangaré =

Malian footballer

Personal information
- Date of birth: 14 September 1974 (age 52)
- Position: Midfielder

Senior career*
Years	Team	Apps	(Gls)
1993–1995	Auxerre B	35	(1)
1995–1996	Tours	10	(0)
1996–1999	Aubervilliers	13	(0)
2000–2001	Paris	15	(0)
Total		73	(1)

International career
1994–2001	Mali		
- * Club domestic league appearances and goals

Sékou Sangaré (born 14 September 1974) is a Malian former professional footballer who played as a midfielder.

== Career ==
Sangaré played club football for Auxerre B, Tours, Aubervilliers and Paris.

He was a member of the Mali national team from 1994 to 2001, competing at the 1994 African Cup of Nations.
