= Koukouvi Akpalo =

Togolese footballer

Personal information
- Full name: Kokouvi Gnavor Akpalo
- Date of birth: 12 December 1972 (age 53)
- Position: Midfielder

International career
Years	Team	Apps	(Gls)
1990–1998	Togo	46	(3)

Koukouvi Gnavor Akpalo (born 12 December 1972) is a Togolese footballer. He played in 31 matches for the Togo national football team from 1993 to 1998. He was also named in Togo's squad for the 1998 African Cup of Nations tournament.
