= Loukima Tamoukini =

Congolese footballer (born 1975)

Personal information
- Full name: Loukima Tamoukini
- Date of birth: 6 September 1975 (age 51)
- Place of birth: Kinshasa, Zaire
- Height: 1.78 m (5 ft 10 in)
- Position: Midfielder

Team information
- Current team: Casa Cultura Corval

Senior career*
Years	Team	Apps	(Gls)
1993–1994	Vita Club		
1994–1995	Leixões		
1995–1997	Unknown		
1997	Aubervilliers	2	(0)
1998–2002	Penafiel	124	(3)
2002–2003	Maia	32	(2)
2003–2005	Feirense	50	(1)
2005–2006	Gondomar	32	(1)
2006	Marco	12	(2)
2007–2008	Olhanense	28	(1)
2008–2009	Louletano	29	(2)
2009–2011	Atlético Reguengos	39	(0)
2011–2012	Redondense	30	(0)
2012–2014	Monte do Trigo	34	(2)
2014–2015	Perolivense	6	(0)
2015–2019	Casa Corval	14	(0)

International career
1994	Zaire	?	(?)
- * Club domestic league appearances and goals as of 8 May 2016

Loukima Tamukini (born, Lukima Tamukini, 6 September 1975 in Kinshasa) is an ex-Congolese footballer who played as defensive midfielder.

== International career ==
Lukima played for Zaire at the 1994 editions of the Africa Cup of Nations, with tournament ending in quarter-final exits.
