= Ousmane Soumano =

Malian footballer

Personal information
- Date of birth: 31 December 1973 (age 52)

International career
Years	Team	Apps	(Gls)
1994	Mali	4	(0)

Ousmane Soumano (born 31 December 1973) is a Malian footballer. He played in four matches for the Mali national football team in 1994. He was also named in Mali's squad for the 1994 African Cup of Nations tournament.
