= Edgar Barbara Sylla =

Guinean footballer

Personal information
- Date of birth: 22 March 1972 (age 54)
- Position: Defender

Senior career*
Years	Team	Apps	(Gls)
c. 1993 – c. 1998	AS Évry		

International career
- Guinea
- * Club domestic league appearances and goals

Edgar Barbara Sylla (born 22 March 1972) is a Guinean former professional footballer who played as a defender. He was a squad member at the 1994 and 1998 Africa Cup of Nations.
