= Etienne Kassa-Ngoma =

Gabonese footballer

Personal information
- Date of birth: 13 June 1962 (age 64)

International career
Years	Team	Apps	(Gls)
1992–1997	Gabon	92	(7)

Etienne Kassa-Ngoma (born 13 June 1962) is a Gabonese footballer. He played in 41 matches for the Gabon national football team from 1992 to 1997. He was also named in Gabon's squad for the 1994 African Cup of Nations tournament.
