= Mohamed Mansaray =

Sierra Leonean footballer

Personal information
- Date of birth: 25 December 1974 (age 51)

International career
Years	Team	Apps	(Gls)
1993–2000	Sierra Leone	15	(2)

Mohamed Mansaray (born 25 December 1974) is a Sierra Leonean footballer. He played in 15 matches for the Sierra Leone national football team from 1993 to 2000. He was also named in Sierra Leone's squad for the 1994 African Cup of Nations tournament.
