= Zakari Lambo =

Nigerien footballer

Personal information
- Full name: Jacques Andre Zakari Lambo
- Date of birth: 14 May 1976 (age 50)
- Place of birth: Argoum Doutchi, Niger
- Height: 1.74 m (5 ft 9 in)
- Position: Striker

Senior career*
| Years | Team | Apps | (Gls) |
| 1993 | JS du Ténéré | | |
| 1994 | Étoile Filante de Ouagadougou | | |
| 1994–1996 | Hutnik Kraków | 38 | (13) |
| 1996 | RCD Mallorca | | |
| 1997–1998 | Eendracht Aalst | 33 | (7) |
| 1999–2000 | VfR Mannheim | 19 | (2) |
| 2000–2001 | UR Namur | | |
| 2002 | Hutnik Kraków | | |
| 2002–2004 | R.F.C. Tournai | | |
| 2004–2005 | KVC Zwevegem Sport | | |
| 2005–2008 | KVK Ieper | | |
| 2008–2009 | Eendracht Wervik | | |

International career
| 1992–1995 | Niger | 20 | (15) |
- * Club domestic league appearances and goals

Jacques Andre Zakari Lambo (born 14 May 1976) is a Nigerien former professional footballer who played as a striker.

He played most of his professional career in Poland and Belgium, appearing for ten different clubs.

== Football career ==
Lambo started his professional career in Nigeren club JS du Ténéré; then he played for Burkinabé club Étoile Filante de Ouagadougou. He arrived in Kraków at age 18, and soon he became a regular player for Hutnik Kraków. After a brief spell with Spanish club RCD Mallorca, he went to Belgium, when he spent most of the subsequent years, playing for Eendracht Aalst, UR Namur, R.F.C. Tournai, KVC Zwevegem Sport, KVK Ieper and Eendracht Wervik. He also played for German side VfR Mannheim and, for the second time, for Hutnik Kraków.

Zakari Lambo represented Niger at senior level, scoring fifteen goals in twenty matches.

== Personal life ==
Lambo is the father of the footballer Zakari Junior Lambo, who also represented the Niger national team.
