= Lamine Moise Cissé =

Senegalese footballer

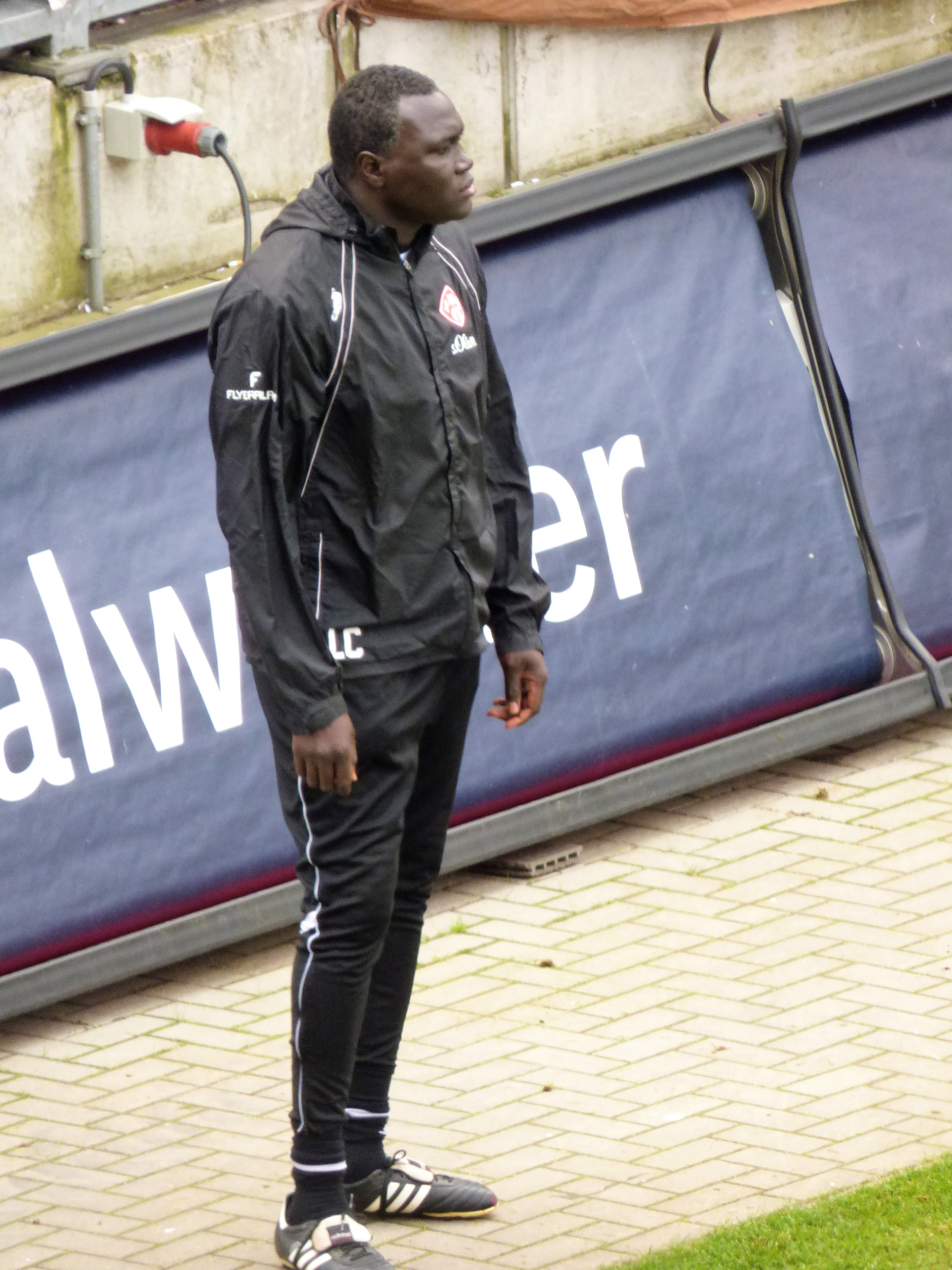

Personal information
- Date of birth: 12 December 1971 (age 54)
- Place of birth: Dakar, Senegal

International career
Years	Team	Apps	(Gls)
1993–2000	Senegal	12	(0)

Lamine Moise Cissé (born 12 December 1971) is a Senegalese footballer. He played in 12 matches for the Senegal national football team from 1993 to 2000. He was also named in Senegal's squad for the 1994 African Cup of Nations tournament.
