= Michel Biyoghé =

Gabonese footballer

Personal information
- Date of birth: 9 December 1970 (age 55)

International career
Years	Team	Apps	(Gls)
1993–2003	Gabon	20	(0)

Michel Biyoghé (born 9 December 1970) is a Gabonese footballer. He played in 20 matches for the Gabon national football team from 1993 to 2003. He was also named in Gabon's squad for the 1994 African Cup of Nations tournament.
