= Taoufik Hicheri =

Tunisian footballer

Personal information
- Date of birth: 8 January 1965 (age 61)
- Place of birth: Tunis, Tunisia
- Position: Defender

Senior career*
| Years | Team | Apps | (Gls) |
| –1991 | Espérance Tunis | | |
| 1991–1994 | Vitória | 48 | (1) |
| 1994–1997 | CS M'saken | | |
| 1997–1999 | Espérance Tunis | | |

International career
| 1989–1998 | Tunisia | 55 | (2) |
- * Club domestic league appearances and goals

Taoufik Hicheri (born 8 January 1965) is a Tunisian former footballer. He played 55 matches for the Tunisia national football team from 1989 to 1998. He was also named in Tunisia's squad for the 1998 African Cup of Nations tournament.
