= Raymond Zarpanelian =

French football coach (1933–2011)

Personal information
- Date of birth: 17 May 1933
- Place of birth: Paris, France
- Date of death: 29 March 2011 (aged 77)
- Place of death: Paris, France

Managerial career
- Years: Team
- 1993–1994: Sierra Leone
- 1997: ASF Bobo Dioulasso
- Al-Ansar

Raymond Zarpanelian (17 May 1933 – 29 March 2011) was an Armenian-French football coach who was last known to have been based at Al-Ansar in Saudi Arabia.

== Career ==
=== Sierra Leone ===
In 1993, he was appointed manager of Sierra Leone.

Assisted by Sam Obi Metzger, Zarpanelian guided Sierra Leone to a 4–0 defeat to Ivory Coast and a 0–0 stalemate with Zambia at the 1994 Africa Cup of Nations, causing him to step down as coach and go back to Paris.

=== Burkina Faso ===
Working with ASFA Yennenga in early 1997, the Franco-Armenian took charge of ASF Bobo Dioulasso by summer of that year, driving them to a runners-up position in the league and a national cup trophy.

=== Uganda ===
Visited Uganda with French journalist Frank Simon to watch the 2000 CECAFA Cup and observe East African football.

== Personal life and death ==
The former Sierra Leone mentor was said to have been a magnanimous person.

Diagnosed with kidney cancer, Zarpanelian died at a hospital in Paris at the age of 78 in 2011 and was buried on 6 April. Previously, he was linked with the Central African Republic technical director position. The Raymond Zarpanelian Trophy was launched in 2014 to honor an African-based French football technician each year, with Pascal Janin getting the award for his achievements with Stade Malien.
