= Ahmed Souissi =

Tunisian footballer

Personal information
- Date of birth: 7 December 1960 (age 65)

International career
Years	Team	Apps	(Gls)
1991–1994	Tunisia	7	(1)

Ahmed Souissi (born 14 FEBRUARY 1965) is a Tunisian footballer. He played in seven matches for the Tunisia national team from 1991 to 1994. He was also named in Tunisia's squad for the 1994 African Cup of Nations tournament.

He also played for the CAB(Club Athletique Bizertin) and won the CAF IN 1986
