= José Antonio Nogueira =

Brazilian footballer and coach (born 1965)

Personal information
- Full name: José Antonio Goldberger Gomes Nogueira
- Date of birth: 26 November 1965 (age 60)
- Place of birth: São Paulo, Brazil

Managerial career
- Years: Team
- 1991–1994: Nacional-SP
- 1994–1996: Nagoya Gakuin University
- 1999–2000: Emelec
- 2001–2002: São Paulo U-15
- 2003–2004: Sierra Leone
- 2005–2006: São Bernardo
- 2006: Guinea-Bissau
- 2007–2008: Al-Ahli
- 2009–2010: ABC
- 2010–2011: Nacional-SP
- 2011: Saint Kitts and Nevis
- 2014: Grêmio Barueri
- 2017: Portuguesa
- 2018–2019: Pakistan
- 2018–2019: Pakistan U23
- 2020–2022: Capital
- 2023: SKA Brasil
- 2026: Nacional-SP
- 2026: Afghanistan

José Antonio Goldberger Gomes Nogueira is a Brazilian football coach.

== Coaching career ==
Nogueira started his coaching career in 1998 with University of São Paulo. His first professional football team was Nacional. Nogueira has also coached internationally with Sierra Leone in 2003, Guinea-Bissau in 2006, and Saint Kitts and Nevis in 2011.

In 2018, he was appointed coach of the Pakistan national team. He signed a three-year contract according to the head of the PFF, Faisal Saleh Hayat. He was let go by the PFF in 2019. He claimed that PFF had not paid him his salary and filed a case, winning in August 2020. In February 2026, Nogueira returned to Asia as the new head coach of the Afghanistan national football team.

== Honours ==
Emelec

- Ecuadorian Serie A runner-up:1998

Al-Ahli

- Kings Cup: 2007
