= Lofti Ben Sassi =

Tunisian footballer

Personal information
- Date of birth: 27 October 1965 (age 61)
- Place of birth: Béja, Tunisia
- Position: Midfielder

International career
Years	Team	Apps	(Gls)
1994	Tunisia	2	(0)

Lofti Ben Sassi (born 27 October 1965) is a Tunisian former footballer. He played in two matches for the Tunisia national football team in 1994. He was also named in Tunisia's squad for the 1994 African Cup of Nations tournament.
