= Martin Mwamba =

Zambian footballer (born 1964)

Personal information
- Date of birth: 6 November 1964 (age 61)

International career
| Years | Team | Apps | (Gls) |
| 1994 | Zambia | 2 | (0) |

Martin Mwamba (born 6 November 1964) is a Zambian footballer. He played in two matches for the Zambia national football team in 1994. He was also named in Zambia's squad for the 1994 African Cup of Nations tournament.
