= Mohamed Brahimi (footballer, born 1970) =

Algerian football manager

Personal information
- Date of birth: 20 January 1970 (age 56)
- Place of birth: Boudghene, Tlemcen, Algeria
- Position: Striker

Senior career*
Years	Team	Apps	(Gls)
1990–2003	WA Tlemcen		
1996–1997	CS Sfaxien		

International career
1993–1997	Algeria	8	(4)
- * Club domestic league appearances and goals

Mohamed Brahimi (born 20 January 1970) is a retired Algerian football striker. He was best goal scorer of the Algerian First league 1995-1996 with 14 goals.
