= Abdoul Yoro N'Diaye =

Senegalese footballer

Personal information
- Date of birth: 22 September 1974 (age 52)

International career
Years	Team	Apps	(Gls)
1994–1997	Senegal	5	(0)

Abdoul Yoro N'Diaye (born 22 September 1974) is a Senegalese footballer. He played in five matches for the Senegal national football team from 1994 to 1997. He was also named in Senegal's squad for the 1994 African Cup of Nations tournament.
