= Ernest Mtawali =

Malawian footballer

Personal information
- Full name: Ernest-Chirwali Mtawali
- Date of birth: 10 October 1966 (age 60)
- Place of birth: Malawi
- Position: Midfielder

Senior career*
Years	Team	Apps	(Gls)
1984–1992	Bloemfontein Celtic		
1992–1994	Mamelodi Sundowns		
1994–1995	Newell's Old Boys	4	(0)
1995–1996	Talleres		
1997–1999	Toulouse FC	27	(0)
1999–2000	Al-Wehda		
2000–2003	Orlando Pirates		
2003–2004	Ajax Cape Town		

International career
1986–2003	Malawi	27	(2)

Managerial career
- 2015–2016: Malawi
- * Club domestic league appearances and goals

Ernest Mtawali, also known as Ernest Chirwali, (born October 10, 1966) is a Malawian retired football (soccer) midfielder.

Mtawali initially played for Hardware Stars in his home country. In South Africa he played for Welkom Real Hearts, Bloemfontein Celtic, Sundowns FC, Orlando Pirates, Hellenic FC and Ajax Cape Town. He also had stints with Newell's Old Boys in Argentina, Toulouse FC in France, Al-Wehda in Saudi Arabia and also represented his country's national team.

He is also reported to have played in the Italian third division, under a false name in order to evade a FIFA ban on players who had played in Apartheid-era South Africa.

He was appointed as caretaker manager of the Malawi national team in June 2015.
