= Mamadou Mariem Diallo =

Senegalese footballer

Personal information
- Date of birth: 2 March 1967 (age 59)
- Place of birth: Senegal
- Position: Defender

Senior career*
Years	Team	Apps	(Gls)
1991–1994	Port Autonome		

International career
1987–1994	Senegal	46	(3)
- * Club domestic league appearances and goals

Mamadou Mariem Diallo (born 2 March 1967) is a Senegalese former footballer who played as a defender.

== Club career ==
Diallo played for Ligue 1 (Senegal) club Port Autonome between 1991 and 1994.

== International career ==
He played in forty-six matches for the Senegal national football team from 1987 to 1994. He was also named in Senegal's squad for the 1992 African Cup of Nations tournament.
