= Aly Male =

Senegalese footballer

Personal information
- Date of birth: 15 November 1970 (age 55)
- Place of birth: Dakar, Senegal
- Position: Midfielder

International career
Years	Team	Apps	(Gls)
1992–1997	Senegal	30	(1)

Aly Male (born 15 November 1970) is a Senegalese footballer. He played in 30 matches for the Senegal national football team from 1992 to 1997. He was also named in Senegal's squad for the 1992 African Cup of Nations tournament.
