= Julius Nyerere University of Kankan =

University in Kankan, Guinea

Coordinates: 10°22′30.36″N 9°18′6.34″W

- Université Julius Nyerere de Kankan
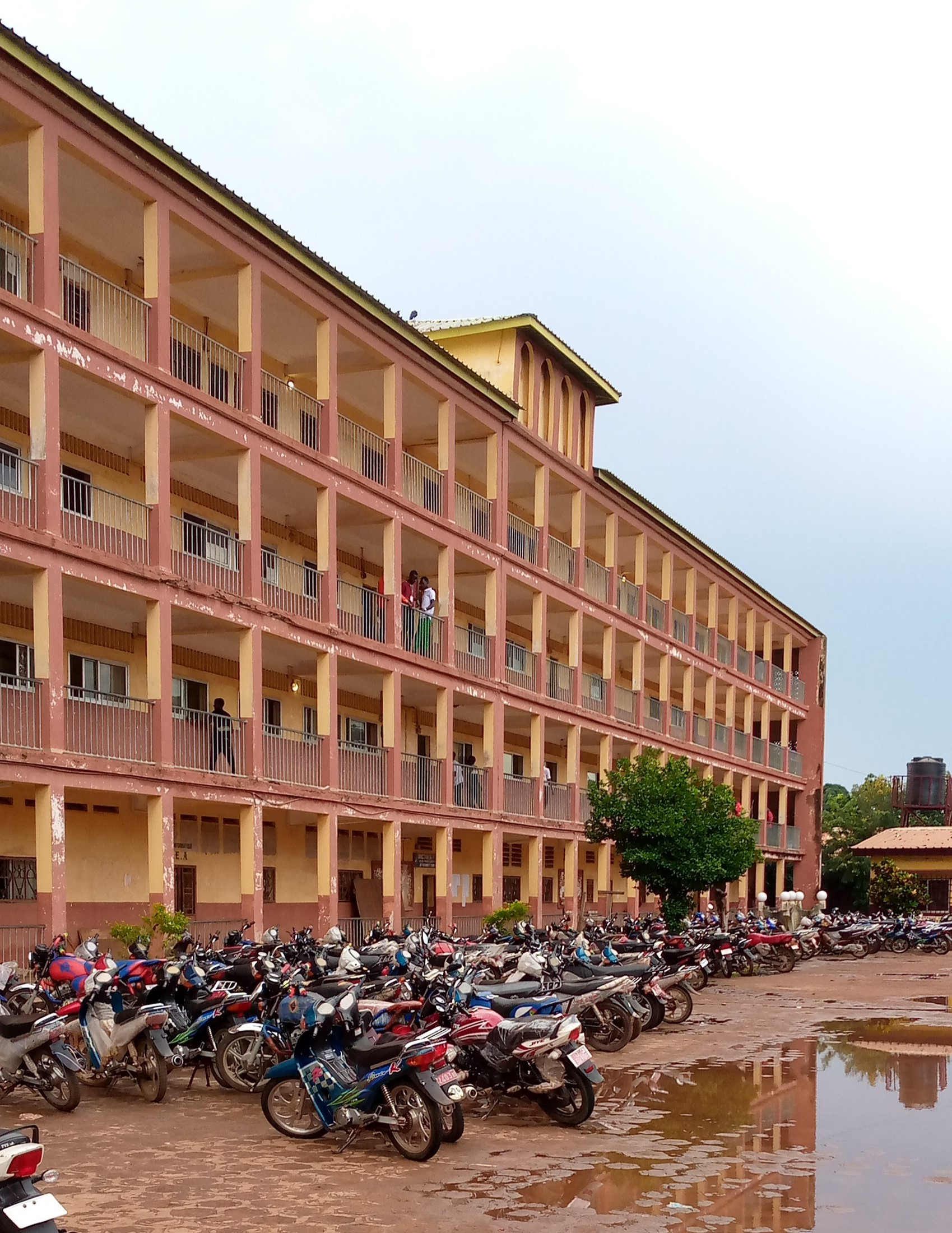
- Established: 1968
- Affiliations: Agence universitaire de la Francophonie
- Rector: Moustapha Sangaré.
- Location: Kankan, Guinea
- Website: www.ujnk.org

Julius Nyerere University of Kankan (UJNK), also known as Université de Kankan, is a university in Kankan, Guinea. It is named after Julius Nyerere, the first President of Tanzania.

== History ==
In 1964 the school was founded as an École normale secondaire, with the intended goal of training Secondary School and Lycée teachers. It was re-dubbed école normale supérieure in 1966. In 1968 the school became a national university in affiliation with the Gamal Abdel Nasser University in Conakry, with the name Institut Polytechnique de Kankan. The school was renamed « université Julius-Nyerere de Kankan » en September 27, 1989. Alumni include the writer Mariama Kesso Diallo.

== Organisation ==
The university is composed of four faculties, a higher school and masters:

- Faculty of natural sciences (Faculté des sciences de la nature)
- Faculty of Social Sciences (Faculté des sciences sociales)
- Faculty of Economic Sciences and Management (Faculté des sciences économiques et de gestion)
- Faculty of Literature and Language (Faculté des lettres et langue)
- Higher School of Information Sciences (École supérieure des sciences de l'information)
- Master in biodiversity and ecology (Master biodiversité et écologie)
- Master in physical chemistry and material science (Master physico-chimique et des matériaux)
- multidisciplinary Master in social sciences (Master pluridisciplinaire en sciences sociales)

== Notable alumni ==
- Aly Kaba - politician

== See also ==
- List of Islamic educational institutions
- List of buildings and structures in Guinea
