= Papa Waly N'Diaye =

Senegalese footballer

Personal information
- Date of birth: 10 April 1974 (age 52)

International career
Years	Team	Apps	(Gls)
1993–1997	Senegal	15	(0)

Papa Waly N'Diaye (born 10 April 1974) is a Senegalese footballer. He played in 15 matches for the Senegal national football team from 1993 to 1997. He was also named in Senegal's squad for the 1994 African Cup of Nations tournament.
