= Mame Birame Mangane =

Senegalese footballer

Personal information
- Date of birth: 19 November 1969 (age 56)
- Position: Midfielder

Senior career*
Years	Team	Apps	(Gls)
1989–1991	ASC HLM		
1991–1993	ASC Jaraaf		
1993–1996	Estrela da Amadora	26	(5)
1996–1997	AD Camacha	3	(0)
1997	C.D. Beja	7	(0)

International career
1993–1994	Senegal	7	(2)
- * Club domestic league appearances and goals

Mame Birame Mangane (born 19 November 1969) is a Senegalese former professional footballer who played as a midfielder. He made seven appearances for the Senegal national team in 1993 and 1994. He was also named in Senegal's squad for the 1994 African Cup of Nations tournament.
