= Petrosport F.C. =

Petrosport FC
- Full name: Petrosport Football Club
- Nickname: Elf Oil Company Team
- Founded: 1956
- Ground: Stade Pierre Claver Divounguy; Port-Gentil, Gabon
- Capacity: 7,000
- Chairman: ?
- Manager: ?
- League: Gabon Championnat National D3
Home colours	Away colours

Petrosport Football Club is a Gabonese football club founded in 1956 and based in Port-Gentil, Ogooué-Maritime province. They play in the Gabon Championnat National D3.

The team was founded in 1956.

== Achievements ==
- Gabon Championnat National D1: 1

1975–1976

== Stadium ==
Currently the team plays at the Stade Pierre Claver Divounguy.
