= Sierra Leone national football team =

Sierra Leone
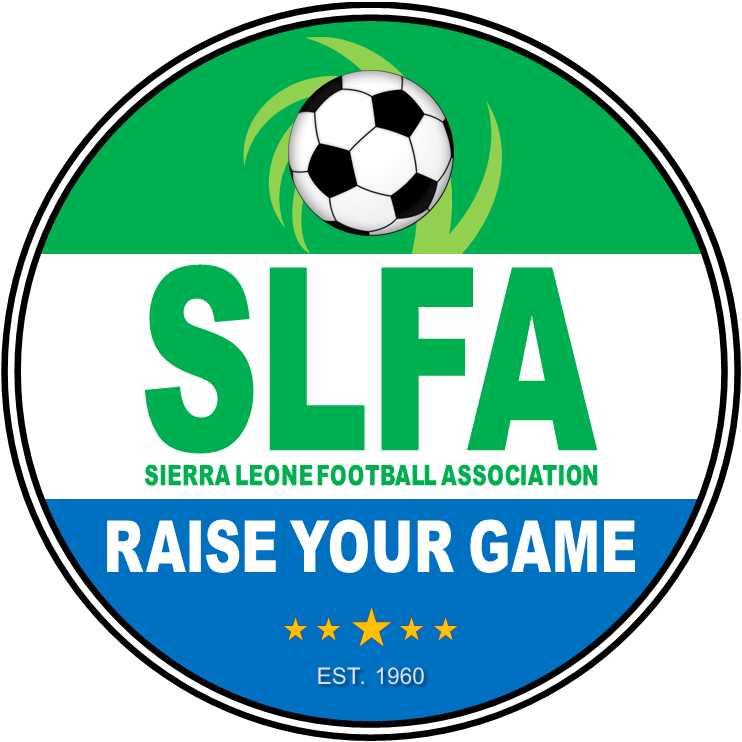
- Nickname: Leone Stars
- Association: Sierra Leone Football Association (SLFA)
- Confederation: CAF (Africa)
- Sub-confederation: WAFU (West Africa)
- Head coach: Didier Gomes Da Rosa
- Captain: Osman Kakay
- Most caps: Umaru Bangura (55)
- Top scorer: Mohamed Kallon; Kei Kamara (8)
- Home stadium: Freetown National Stadium
- FIFA code: SLE
First colours	Second colours	Third colours

FIFA ranking
- Current: 130 ▼8 (7 October 2026)
- Highest: 50 (August 2014)
- Lowest: 172 (September 2007)

First international
- Sierra Leone 0–2 Nigeria (Freetown, Sierra Leone; 10 August 1949)

Biggest win
- Sierra Leone 5–1 Niger (Freetown, Sierra Leone; 7 March 1976); Sierra Leone 5–1 Niger (Freetown, Sierra Leone; 3 June 1995); Sierra Leone 4–0 São Tomé and Príncipe (Freetown, Sierra Leone; 22 April 2000)

Biggest defeat
- Mali 6–0 Sierra Leone (Bamako, Mali; 17 June 2007); Syria 6–0 Sierra Leone (Syria; 5 June 2009)

Africa Cup of Nations
- Appearances: 3 (first in 1994)
- Best result: Group stage (1994, 1996, 2021)

The Sierra Leone national football team represents Sierra Leone in association football and is governed by the Sierra Leone Football Association. It has qualified for Africa Cup of Nations three times.

== History ==
Sierra Leone's first match was at home on 10 August 1949 against another British colony, Nigeria, and was lost 2–0. In 1954 it played another British colony and British administered U.N trust territory, Gold Coast and Trans-Volta Togoland, and lost 2–0 away. On 22 April 1961, it hosted Nigeria and lost 4–2. On 12 November 1966, it hosted Liberia in its first match against a non-British colony and earned its first draw, 1–1. A week later, it lost 2–0 in Liberia. On 13 January 1971, it played its first match against a non-African team, West Germany's B-team. The match in Sierra Leone was won 1–0 by the Germans. Sierra Leone's first match outside Africa was its first against an Asian nation, China. It lost 4–1 in China on 5 April 1974.

In August 2014, Sierra Leone FA cancelled all association football matches in an effort to stop the spread of the 2014 Ebola virus epidemic in Sierra Leone, a week after Liberian FA did the same. Sierra Leonean players playing outside Sierra Leone, such as Michael Lahoud playing in the United States, were discriminated against, with opposition players refusing to swap shirts, shake hands and allow them to certain places of the stadium because they fear that they could be carrying the disease. The Sierra Leonean national team wasn't allowed to play home games and all players had to be foreign-based.

== Results and fixtures ==
The following is a list of match results in the last 12 months, as well as any future matches that have been scheduled.

Win Draw Loss Fixture

=== 2026 ===
27 March 2026 FIFA Series	Oman	Cancelled	Sierra Leone	Baku, Azerbaijan
15:00 UTC+4				Stadium: Dalga Arena
Note: Match cancelled due to Oman withdrawing following the 2026 Iran war.

30 March 2026 FIFA Series	Azerbaijan	1–1 (9–8 p)	Sierra Leone	Sumgait, Azerbaijan
19:00 UTC+4	R. Mammadov 72'	Report	D. Kanu 28'	Stadium: Sumgayit City Stadium; Referee: Asker Nadjafaliev (Uzbekistan)
	Penalties
	T. Bayramov (penalty scored); K. Alıyev (penalty scored); Isgandarli (penalty scored); A. Guseynov (penalty missed); Sadykhov (penalty scored); R. Akhmedzade (penalty scored); Khaybulayev (penalty scored); Kryvotsyuk (penalty scored); R. Mammadov (penalty scored); B. Guseynov (penalty scored)		(penalty missed) A. Koroma; (penalty scored) Kaikai; (penalty scored) Gandi; (penalty scored) Kamara; (penalty scored) Quee; (penalty scored) Bah; (penalty scored) Kallon; (penalty scored) Jarjue Kabia; (penalty scored) N. Jalloh; (penalty missed) Turay

6 June Friendly	Sierra Leone	1–0	Liberia	Freetown, Sierra Leone
16:00 UTC+0	Jarjue Kabia 67'	Report		Stadium: Bo Stadium

9 June Friendly	Liberia	3–1	Sierra Leone	Paynesville, Liberia
16:00 UTC+0	Teclar 30'; Kosiah 43', 71'	Report	D. Kanu 90+4'	Stadium: Samuel Kanyon Doe Sports Complex

24 September 2027 AFCON qualification	Sierra Leone	2–3	Zimbabwe	El Jadida, Morocco
19:00 UTC+0	Conteh 7'; Tarawallie 27'	Report	Munetsi 72', 89'; Chirewa 77'	Stadium: Ben M'Hamed El Abdi Stadium; Referee: Lucky Razake Kasalirwe (Uganda)

28 September 2027 AFCON qualification	Equatorial Guinea	1–0	Sierra Leone	Yaoundé, Cameroon
17:00 UTC+1	Zúñiga 1'	Report		Stadium: Ahmadou Ahidjo Stadium; Referee: Fabrice Senyo (Togo)

11 November 2027 AFCON qualification	DR Congo	v	Sierra Leone	TBD, DR Congo
TBD				Stadium: TBD

15 November 2027 AFCON qualification	Sierra Leone	v	DR Congo	TBD, Sierra Leone
TBD				Stadium: TBD

=== 2027 ===
24 March 2027 AFCON qualification	Zimbabwe	v	Sierra Leone	TBD, Zimbabwe
TBD				Stadium: TBD

28 March 2027 AFCON qualification	Sierra Leone	v	Equatorial Guinea	TBD, Sierra Leone
TBD				Stadium: TBD

== Coaching history ==
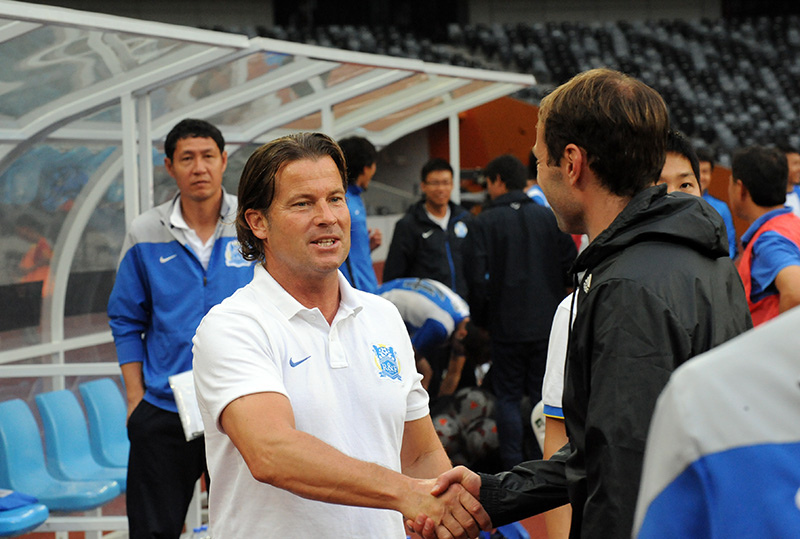
Roger Palmgren, here in a white shirt, became the manager of Sierra Leone in 1994

- (West Germany) Burkhard Pape (1966–1968)
- (West Germany) Klaus Ebbighausen (1976–1978)
- (England) Warwick Rimmer (1979)
- (Sierra Leone) Christian Cole (1989)
- (Sierra Leone) Christian Cole (1991)
- (France) Raymond Zarpanelian (1993–1994)
- (Sweden) Roger Palmgren (1994–1996)
- (Sierra Leone) John Sherington (1996–1997)
- (Sierra Leone) Abdulai Sesay (1997–2000)
- (Federal Republic of Yugoslavia) Dušan Drašković (2000)
- (Sierra Leone) Christian Cole (2001)
- (Brazil) José Antonio Nogueira (2003)
- (Sierra Leone) John Sherington (2003–2006)
- (Nigeria) James Peters (2006–2007)
- (Sierra Leone) Mohamed Kanu (2007–2009)
- (Sierra Leone) Daniel Koroma (2009–2010)
- (Sierra Leone) Christian Cole (2010–2011)
- (Sweden) Lars-Olof Mattsson (2011–2013)
- (Northern Ireland) Johnathan McKinstry (2013–2014)
- (Sierra Leone) Atto Mensah (2014)
- (Sierra Leone) John Ajina Sesay (2014–2015)
- (Sierra Leone) John Sherington (2015)
- (Ghana) Sellas Tetteh (2015–2017)
- (Sierra Leone) John Keister (2017–2019)
- (Ghana) Sellas Tetteh (2019–2020)
- (Sierra Leone) John Keister (2020–2023)
- (Sierra Leone) Amidu Karim (2023–2025)
- (Sierra Leone) Mohamed Kallon (2025–2026)

== Players ==
=== Current squad ===
The following players were called up for the 2027 Africa Cup of Nations qualification matches against DR Congo on 12 and 17 November.

Information correct as of 28 September 2026, after the match against Equatorial Guinea.

No.	Pos.	Player	Date of birth (age)	Caps	Goals	Club
	GK	Ibrahim Sesay	18 October 2004 (age 22)	13	0	(Football Federation of Armenia) Alashkert
	GK	Francis Koroma	15 May 2000 (age 26)	4	0	(Nigeria Football Federation) Katsina United
	GK	Mamadou Jalloh	29 November 2006 (age 19)	3	0	(Football Association of Finland) VPS
	DF	Osman Kakay	25 August 1997 (age 29)	29	0	(Slovak Football Association) Košice
	DF	Emmanuel Samadia	19 April 2001 (age 25)	28	0	(United States Soccer Federation) Hartford Athletic
	DF	Alpha Turay	26 May 2005 (age 21)	12	0	(Egyptian Football Association) El Gouna
	DF	Juma Bah	11 April 2006 (age 20)	9	1	(German Football Association) FC Augsburg
	DF	MJ Kamson-Kamara	14 February 2006 (age 20)	2	0	(Scottish Football Association) Kilmarnock
	MF	Saidu Fofanah	14 September 1997 (age 29)	13	1	(Ethiopian Football Federation) Wolaitta Dicha
	MF	Tyrese Fornah	11 September 1999 (age 27)	11	0	(The Football Association) Northampton Town
	MF	Ibrahim Turay	12 October 2000 (age 26)	9	1	(Football Association of Iceland) Stjarnan
	MF	Momoh Kamara	6 May 2005 (age 21)	8	1	(Swedish Football Association) Elfsborg
	MF	Saidu Kamara	3 March 2002 (age 24)	8	0	(Ethiopian Football Federation) CBE SA
	MF	Samuel Bekoe	24 August 1997 (age 29)	3	0	(Guinean Football Federation) Hafia
	FW	Alhassan Koroma	9 June 2000 (age 26)	27	3	(United Arab Emirates Football Association) Baniyas
	FW	Augustus Kargbo	24 August 1999 (age 27)	24	5	(The Football Association) Blackburn Rovers
	FW	Sullay Kaikai	26 August 1995 (age 31)	22	1	(The Football Association) Cambridge United
	FW	Alie Conteh	29 October 2002 (age 24)	8	2	(Football Association of Finland) Inter Turku
	FW	Daniel Kanu	14 November 2004 (age 22)	8	1	(The Football Association) Notts County
	FW	Idris Kanu	5 December 1999 (age 26)	5	0	(The Football Association) Barnet
	FW	Sallieu Tarawallie	3 January 1995 (age 31)	4	1	(Sierra Leone Football Association) Kallon
	FW	Santigie Sesay	1 July 2003 (age 23)	1	0	(Football Association of Montenegro) Arsenal Tivat
	FW	Raees Bangura-Williams	2 July 2004 (age 22)	0	0	(The Football Association) Cambridge United
	FW	Mohamed Fofanah	30 August 2005 (age 21)	0	0	(Sierra Leone Football Association) East End Lions
	FW	Malachi Jones	23 September 2003 (age 23)	0	0	(United States Soccer Federation) New York City

=== Recent call-ups ===
The following players have been called up to the national team in the past 12 months but are not part of the current squad.

Pos.	Player	Date of birth (age)	Caps	Goals	Club	Latest call-up
GK	Alhaji Sesay	9 October 1998 (age 28)	7	0	(Sierra Leone) Bhantal	v. Liberia, 9 June 2026
GK	Mohamed Kargbo	1 January 2005 (age 21)	0	0	(Sierra Leone) Old Edwardians	v. Liberia, 9 June 2026
DF	Abdoulie Jarjue Kabia	27 January 2001 (age 25)	9	0	(Belarus) Minsk	v. Equatorial Guinea, 28 September 2026
DF	Alex Bangura	13 July 1999 (age 27)	5	0	(England) Middlesbrough	v. Equatorial Guinea, 28 September 2026
DF	Ernest Koroma	19 June 2006 (age 20)	0	0	(Sierra Leone) Bhantal	v. Liberia, 9 June 2026
DF	Nathaniel Jalloh	7 September 2005 (age 21)	10	0	(Sierra Leone) Kallon	v. Azerbaijan, 30 March 2026
DF	Citta Bah	27 April 2006 (age 20)	0	0	(Denmark) Midtjylland	v. Azerbaijan, 30 March 2026
MF	Kallum Cesay	4 September 2002 (age 24)	5	2	(England) Salford City	v. Equatorial Guinea, 28 September 2026
MF	Hindolo Mustapha	29 July 2006 (age 20)	3	1	(England) Notts County	v. Equatorial Guinea, 28 September 2026
MF	Azeem Abdulai	9 December 2002 (age 23)	1	0	(Scotland) Hibernian	v. Equatorial Guinea, 28 September 2026
MF	Abu Dumbuya	29 January 1999 (age 27)	22	1	(Libya) Al-Wefaq Ajdabiya	v. Liberia, 9 June 2026
MF	John Bilili Sesay	1 August 2007 (age 19)	4	0	(Republic of Ireland) Bray Wanderers	v. Liberia, 9 June 2026
MF	Kwame Quee	7 September 1996 (age 30)	36	3	(Iceland) Ungmennafélagið Víkingur	v. Azerbaijan, 30 March 2026
MF	Kamil Conteh	26 December 2002 (age 23)	12	0	(England) Lincoln City	v. Azerbaijan, 30 March 2026
MF	Alpha Kabia	22 November 2005 (age 20)	1	0	(United States) Minnesota United	v. Azerbaijan, 30 March 2026
MF	Santigie Fornah	1 February 2007 (age 19)	0	0	(Sierra Leone) SLIFA	v. Azerbaijan, 30 March 2026
FW	Josh Koroma	9 November 1998 (age 28)	4	0	(England) Chesterfied	v. Equatorial Guinea, 28 September 2026
FW	Mustapha Bundu	27 February 1997 (age 29)	24	4	(Germany) Hannover 96	v. Liberia, 9 June 2026
FW	Mohamed Buya Turay	10 January 1995 (age 31)	21	3	Free agent	v. Liberia, 9 June 2026
FW	Amadou Bakayoko	1 January 1996 (age 30)	18	4	(Japan) Hokkaido Consadole Sapporo	v. Liberia, 9 June 2026
FW	Samuel Gandi	19 October 2006 (age 20)	4	1	(Moldova) Politehnica UTM Chișinău	v. Liberia, 9 June 2026
FW	Yayah Kallon	30 June 2001 (age 25)	2	0	(Italy) Casertana	v. Liberia, 9 June 2026
FW	Sampha Kamara	20 October 1988 (age 38)	0	0	(Finland) OPS	v. Liberia, 9 June 2026
FW	Jay Tee Kamara	10 May 2002 (age 24)	1	0	(United States) Portland Hearts of Pine	v. Azerbaijan, 30 March 2026
Notes^{INJ} Withdrew due to injury.^{PRE} Preliminary squad / standby^{RET} Had announced retirement from international association football.^{SUS} Is serving a suspension.^{PRI} Absent due to private circumstances.^{WD} Withdrawn.

== Records ==
As of 12 October 2025
Players in bold are still active with Sierra Leone.

=== Most appearances ===
Umaru Bangura is Sierra Leone's most capped player with 55 appearances.

Rank	Name	Caps	Goals	Career
1	Umaru Bangura	55	4	2006–2022
2	Ibrahim Bah	45	3	1986–1998
2	Kei Kamara	45	8	2008–2025
4	Mohamed Kallon	41	8	1995–2012
5	Sheriff Suma	37	3	2006–2015
6	**Kwame Quee**	35	3	2012–present
7	**Yeami Dunia**	34	0	2012–present
8	Medo Kamara	33	1	2008–2021
9	Julius Wobay	32	4	2001–2018
10	Ibrahim Kargbo	30	1	2000–2013

=== Top goalscorers ===
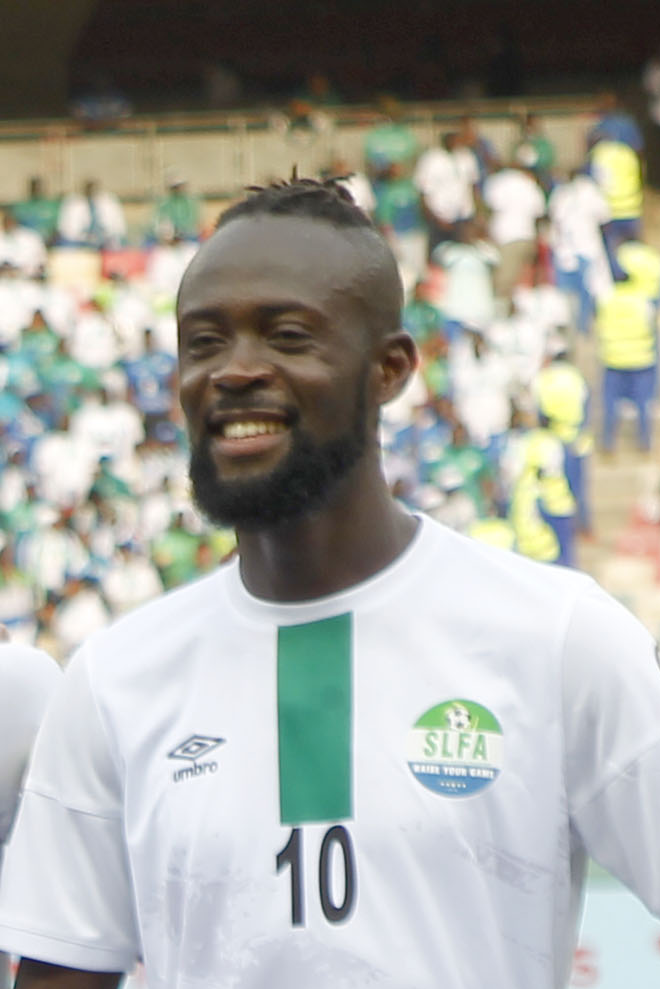
Kei Kamara is Sierra Leone's joint-top scorer with 8 goals.

Rank	Name	Goals	Caps	Ratio	Career
1	Mohamed Kallon	8	41	0.2	1995–2012
1	Kei Kamara	8	45	0.18	2008–2025
3	Lamine Conteh	6	20	0.3	1993–2006
4	**Alhaji Kamara**	5	19	0.26	2012–present
4	**Augustus Kargbo**	5	24	0.21	2021–present
6	John Dumbuya	4	4	1	1984–1987
6	Teteh Bangura	4	12	0.33	2011–2014
6	**Amadou Bakayoko**	4	16	0.25	2022–present
6	Alhassan Kamara	4	16	0.25	2012–2018
6	**Musa Noah Kamara**	4	16	0.25	2018–present
6	Abu Kanu	4	16	0.25	1994–2003
6	Mustapha Bangura	4	17	0.24	2005–2016
6	**Mustapha Bundu**	4	23	0.17	2019–present
6	Julius Wobay	4	32	0.13	2001–2018
6	Umaru Bangura	4	55	0.07	2006–2022

== Competitive record ==
=== FIFA World Cup ===
FIFA World Cup record									Qualification record					
Year	Round	Position	Pld	W	D	L	GF	GA	Pld	W	D	L	GF	GA
(Chile) 1962 and (England) 1966	Not affiliated to CAF								Not affiliated to CAF					
(Mexico) 1970	Did not enter								Did not enter					
(West Germany) 1974	Did not qualify								2	0	0	2	0	3
(Argentina) 1978	Did not qualify								4	1	1	2	8	9
(Spain) 1982	Did not qualify								2	0	1	1	3	5
(Mexico) 1986	Did not qualify								2	0	0	2	0	5
(Italy) 1990	Did not enter								Did not enter					
(United States) 1994	Withdrew								Withdrew					
(France) 1998	Did not qualify								7	2	1	4	4	8
(South Korea) (Japan) 2002	Did not qualify								10	2	1	7	6	17
(Germany) 2006	Did not qualify								2	0	1	1	1	2
(South Africa) 2010	Did not qualify								8	3	2	3	5	8
(Brazil) 2014	Did not qualify								6	2	2	2	10	10
(Russia) 2018	Did not qualify								2	1	0	1	2	2
(Qatar) 2022	Did not qualify								2	1	0	1	2	3
(Canada) (Mexico) (United States) 2026	Did not qualify								10	4	3	3	12	10
(Morocco) (Portugal) (Spain) 2030	To be determined								To be determined					
(Saudi Arabia) 2034	To be determined								To be determined					
Total		0/16							57	16	12	29	53	82

=== Africa Cup of Nations ===
Year	Round	Position	Pld	W	D*	L	GF	GA	Squad
(Ethiopia) 1962	Not affiliated to CAF								
(Ghana) 1963	Not affiliated to CAF								
(Tunisia) 1965	Not affiliated to CAF								
(Ethiopia) 1968	Did not enter								
(Sudan) 1970	Withdrew								
(Cameroon) 1972	Did not enter								
(Egypt) 1974	Did not qualify								
(Ethiopia) 1976	Did not enter								
(Ghana) 1978	Did not qualify								
(Nigeria) 1980	Did not enter								
(Libya) 1982	Did not qualify								
(Ivory Coast) 1984	Did not qualify								
(Egypt) 1986	Withdrew								
(Morocco) 1988	Did not qualify								
(Algeria) 1990	Withdrew								
(Senegal) 1992	Did not qualify								
(Tunisia) 1994	Round 1	10th	2	0	1	1	0	4	Squad
(South Africa) 1996	Round 1	13th	3	1	0	2	2	7	Squad
(Burkina Faso) 1998	Withdrew								
(Ghana) (Nigeria) 2000	Disqualified due to civil war								
(Mali) 2002	Did not qualify								
(Tunisia) 2004	Did not qualify								
(Egypt) 2006	Did not qualify								
(Ghana) 2008	Did not qualify								
(Angola) 2010	Did not qualify								
(Equatorial Guinea) (Gabon) 2012	Did not qualify								
(South Africa) 2013	Did not qualify								
(Equatorial Guinea) 2015	Did not qualify								
(Gabon) 2017	Did not qualify								
(Egypt) 2019	Disqualified due to FIFA suspension								
(Cameroon) 2021	Group stage	18th	3	0	2	1	2	3	Squad
(Ivory Coast) 2023	Did not qualify								
(Morocco) 2025	Did not qualify								
(Kenya) (Tanzania) (Uganda) 2027	To be determined								
2028	To be determined								
Total	0 titles	3/35	8	1	3	4	4	14	—

== Coaching staff ==
Head coach	(Sierra Leone) Amidu Karim
Assistant coach	(Sierra Leone) Alusine Sesay
Assistant coach	(Sierra Leone) Amara Rahman Bangura
Sport therapist	(Belgium) Joris De Vos
Head of medical	(Sierra Leone) Osman Fofanah
Team manager	(Sierra Leone) Abdulai Kargbo

== Honours ==
=== Regional ===
- Amílcar Cabral Cup
  - (gold) Champions (2): 1993, 1995
  - (silver) Runners-up (2): 1984, 1986
