= Zaire national football team results =

This article provides details of international football games played by the Zaire national football team from 1971 to 1997, when the Democratic Republic of the Congo was named Zaire.

== 1970s ==
=== 1972 ===
25 February 1972 1972 CAN group stage	Zaire	1–1	Sudan	Douala, Cameroon
	Mayanga 53'		Hasabu El-Sagheer 55'	Stadium: Stade de la Réunification; Attendance: 5,000; Referee: Sané Mady Diallo (Mali)

27 February 1972 1972 CAN group stage	Zaire	2–0	Congo	Douala, Cameroon
	N'Tumba 16', 59'			Stadium: Stade de la Réunification; Attendance: 7,000; Referee: Théodore Laclé (Togo)

29 February 1972 1972 CAN group stage	Morocco	1–1	Zaire	Douala, Cameroon
	Faras 3'		Mayanga 36'	Stadium: Stade de la Réunification; Attendance: 20,000; Referee: Robert Foiret (Mauritius)

2 March 1972 1972 CAN semifinals	Zaire	3–4 (a.e.t.)	Mali	Douala, Cameroon
	N'Tumba 6'; Etepé 61'; Ngassebe 78'		Traoré 17'; Keita 48', 92'; Touré 68'	Stadium: Stade de la Réunification; Attendance: 2,000; Referee: George Lamptey (Ghana)

4 March 1972 1972 CAN third place match	Cameroon	5–2	Zaire	Yaoundé, Cameroon
	Akono 4' (pen.); N'Dongo 31'; Owona 32'; Mouthé 34'; N'Doga 42'		Etepé 13'; Mayanga 17'	Stadium: Stade Omnisports; Attendance: 4,000; Referee: George Lamptey (Ghana)

6 June 1972 1974 FIFA WC qualification	Togo	0–0	Zaire	Lomé, Togo
				Stadium: Stade Général Eyadema; Attendance: 5,719; Referee: Sunny Olufemi Woghiren (Nigeria)

20 June 1972 1974 FIFA WC qualification	Zaire	4–0	Togo	Kinshasa, Zaire
	Kembo 27'; Mayanga 37', 73'; Etepé 79'			Stadium: Stade du 20 Mai; Attendance: 24,025; Referee: Stanislas Kamdem (Cameroon)

2 July 1972 Friendly	Zaire	6–0	Guinea	Kinshasa, Zaire
	? (?); ? (?); ? (?); ? (?); ? (?); ? (?)			Stadium: Stade du 20 Mai

=== 1973 ===
4 February 1973 1974 FIFA WC qualification	Cameroon	0–1	Zaire	Douala, Cameroon
			N'Tumba 2'	Stadium: Stade de la Réunification; Attendance: 21,752; Referee: Moise Kante Kangni (Dahomey)

25 February 1973 1974 FIFA WC qualification	Zaire	0–1	Cameroon	Kinshasa, Zaire
			Ndongo 43'	Stadium: Stade du 20 Mai; Attendance: 46,916; Referee: Francis Wolbert Anguiley (Gabon)

27 February 1973 1974 FIFA WC qualification	Zaire	2–0	Cameroon	Kinshasa, Zaire
	Etepé 3'; Tshinabu 88' (pen.)			Stadium: Stade du 20 Mai; Attendance: 16,271; Referee: Francis Wolbert Anguiley (Gabon)

15 April 1973 1974 CAN qualification	Upper Volta	0–5	Zaire	Ouagadougou, Upper Volta
			Kidumu (?); Mayanga (?); Mavuba (?)

22 April 1973 1974 CAN qualification	Zaire	4–1	Upper Volta	Kinshasa, Zaire
	? (?); ? (?); ? (?); ? (?)		? (?)	Stadium: Stade du 20 Mai

27 May 1973 1974 CAN qualification	Cameroon	2–1	Zaire	Yaoundé, Cameroon
	? (?); ? (?)		? (?)	Stadium: Stade Omnisports

14 June 1973 1974 CAN qualification	Zaire	2–0	Cameroon	Kinshasa, Zaire
	? (?); ? (?)			Stadium: Stade du 20 Mai

5 August 1973 1974 FIFA WC qualification	Ghana	1–0	Zaire	Accra, Ghana
	Armah 35' (pen.)			Stadium: Ohene Djan Stadium; Attendance: 30,000; Referee: Gebreyesus Tesfaye (Ethiopia)

19 August 1973 1974 FIFA WC qualification	Zaire	4–1	Ghana	Kinshasa, Zaire
	N'Tumba 1'; Kembo 10'; Etepé 65'; Mavuba 89' (pen.)		Sam 51'	Stadium: Stade du 20 Mai; Attendance: 80,869; Referee: Marc-Emile N'Difo (Cameroon)

4 November 1973 1974 FIFA WC qualification	Zambia	0–2	Zaire	Lusaka, Zambia
			Mayanga 22'; Etepé 33'	Stadium: 7 April Stadium; Attendance: 33,793; Referee: Farah Weheliye Addo (Somalia)

18 November 1973 1974 FIFA WC qualification	Zaire	2–1	Zambia	Kinshasa, Zaire
	Kembo 32'; Etepé 82'		Kapita 33'	Stadium: Stade du 20 Mai; Attendance: 6,050; Referee: Badara N'Diaye (Senegal)

9 December 1973 1974 FIFA WC qualification	Zaire	3–0	Morocco	Kinshasa, Zaire
	Kembo 41', 70'; Ekofa 79'			Stadium: Stade du 20 Mai; Attendance: 70,000; Referee: Major George Lamptey (Ghana)

23 December 1973 1974 FIFA WC qualification	Morocco	0–2 (w/o)	Zaire	Mohammedia, Morocco
	Withdrew			Stadium: Stade El Bachir

=== 1974 ===
3 March 1974 1974 CAN group stage	Zaire	2–1	Guinea	Damanhur, Egypt
	Mulamba 18', 65'		Sylla 25'	Stadium: Ala'ab Damanhour Stadium; Attendance: 1,500; Referee: Saad Gamar (Libya)

5 March 1974 1974 CAN group stage	Congo	2–1	Zaire	Alexandria, Egypt
	M'Bono 70'; Minga 81'		Mayanga 25'	Stadium: Alexandria Stadium; Attendance: 8,000; Referee: Abdelkrim Benghezal (Algeria)

7 March 1974 1974 CAN group stage	Zaire	4–1	Mauritius	Alexandria, Egypt
	Mulamba 15'; Mayanga 19', 76'; Etepé 38'		Imbert 61'	Stadium: Alexandria Stadium; Attendance: 15,000; Referee: Wallace Johnson (Sierra Leone)

9 March 1974 1974 CAN semifinals	Egypt	2–3	Zaire	Cairo, Egypt
	Ilunga 41' (o.g.); Abo Gresha 54'		Mulamba 55', 72'; Mantantu 61'	Stadium: Nasser Stadium; Attendance: 50,000; Referee: Abdelkader Aouissi (Algeria)

12 March 1974 1974 CAN Final	Zaire	2–2 (a.e.t.)	Zambia	Cairo, Egypt
	Mulamba 65', 117'	Report	Kaushi 40'; Sinyangwe 120'	Stadium: Nasser Stadium; Attendance: 55,000; Referee: Saad Gamar (Libya)

14 March 1974 1974 CAN Final	Zaire	2–0	Zambia	Cairo, Egypt
	Mulamba 30', 76'	Report		Stadium: Nasser Stadium; Attendance: 1,000; Referee: Saad Gamar (Libya)

14 June 1974 1974 FIFA WC group stage	Zaire	0–2	Scotland	Dortmund, West Germany
19:30 CET		Report	Lorimer 26'; Jordan 34'	Stadium: Westfalenstadion; Attendance: 25,800; Referee: Gerhard Schulenburg (West Germany)

18 June 1974 1974 FIFA WC group stage	Yugoslavia	9–0	Zaire	Gelsenkirchen, West Germany
19:30 CET	Bajević 8', 30', 81'; Džajić 14'; Šurjak 18'; Katalinski 22'; Bogićević 35'; Oblak 61'; Petković 65'	Report		Stadium: Parkstadion; Attendance: 31,700; Referee: Omar Delgado Gómez (Colombia)

22 June 1974 1974 FIFA WC group stage	Zaire	0–3	Brazil	Gelsenkirchen, West Germany
16:00 CET		Report	Jairzinho 12'; Rivellino 66'; Valdomiro 79'	Stadium: Parkstadion; Attendance: 36,200; Referee: Nicolae Rainea (Romania)

6 September 1974 Friendly	Libya	0–2	Zaire	Tripoli, Libya
			? (?); ? (?)

=== 1975 ===
6 April 1975 1976 Olympics qualification	Zaire	4–1	Upper Volta	Kinshasa, Zaire
	? (?); ? (?); ? (?); ? (?)		? (?)	Stadium: Stade du 20 Mai

27 April 1975 1976 Olympics qualification	Upper Volta	1–2	Zaire	Ouagadougou, Upper Volta
	? (?)		? (?); ? (?)	Stadium: Stade Municipal de Ouagadougou

12 July 1975 Friendly	Egypt	3–2	Zaire	Tehran, Iran
	? (?); ? (?); ? (?)		? (?); ? (?)	Stadium: Aryamehr Stadium

15 July 1975 Friendly	Iran	3–1	Zaire	Tehran, Iran
	? (?); ? (?); ? (?)		? (?)	Stadium: Aryamehr Stadium

9 October 1975 Friendly	Uganda	1–2	Zaire	Kampala, Uganda
	? (?)		? (?); ? (?)

19 November 1975 Friendly	Cameroon	2–1	Zaire	Yaoundé, Cameroon
	? (?); ? (?)		? (?)	Stadium: Stade Omnisports

30 November 1975 1976 Olympics qualification	Senegal	3–1	Zaire	Dakar, Senegal
	? (?); ? (?); ? (?)		? (?)	Stadium: Stade Demba Diop

14 December 1975 1976 Olympics qualification	Zaire	2–0 (4–5 p)	Senegal	Kinshasa, Zaire
	? (?); ? (?)			Stadium: Stade du 20 Mai

=== 1976 ===
1 March 1976 1976 CAN group stage	Nigeria	4–2	Zaire	Dire Dawa, Tunisia
	Mohammed 28', 44'; Ojebode 37' (pen.); Usiyan 90'		Kabasu 51'; Ekofa 58'	Stadium: Dire Dawa Stadium; Attendance: 4,000; Referee: Hédi Seoudi (Tunisia)

4 March 1976 1976 CAN group stage	Morocco	1–0	Zaire	Dire Dawa, Tunisia
	Zahraoui 80'			Stadium: Dire Dawa Stadium; Attendance: 4,000; Referee: Yousef Alghoul (Libya)

6 March 1976 1976 CAN group stage	Zaire	1–1	Sudan	Dire Dawa, Tunisia
	Mulamba 41'		Gagarin 14'	Stadium: Dire Dawa Stadium; Attendance: 4,000; Referee: Robert Foiret (Mauritius)

29 June 1976 Friendly	Rwanda	1–6	Zaire	Libreville, Gabon
	? (?)		? (?); ? (?); ? (?); ? (?); ? (?); ? (?)

1 July 1976 Friendly	Gabon	1–1	Zaire	Libreville, Gabon
	? (?)		? (?)

3 July 1976 Friendly	Cameroon	2–1	Zaire	Libreville, Gabon
	? (?); ? (?)		? (?)

5 July 1976 Friendly	Burundi	0–1	Zaire	Libreville, Gabon
			? (?)

1976 1978 FIFA WC qualification	Zaire	(w/o)	Central African Republic
			Withdrew

=== 1977 ===
19 July 1977 1977 Beijing Tournament	China	3–2	Zaire	Beijing, China
	Zhixing (?); Shangbin (?); Changtai (?)		? (?); ? (?)

29 July 1977 1977 Beijing Tournament	Iran	1–3	Zaire	Beijing, China
	? (?)		? (?); ? (?); ? (?)

1977 1978 FIFA WC qualification	Nigeria	(w/o)	Zaire
			Withdrew

=== 1979 ===
15 April 1979 1980 CAN qualification	Congo	4–2	Zaire	Brazzaville, PR Congo
	? (?); ? (?); ? (?); ? (?)		? (?); ? (?)	Stadium: Stade de la Revolution

29 April 1979 1980 CAN qualification	Zaire	4–1	Congo	Kinshasa, Zaire
	Ngeleme 44' (?); Mukendi (?); Babo (?)		Bahamboula 14'	Stadium: Stade du 20 Mai

30 June 1979 Friendly	Zaire	2–1	Zambia	Kinshasa, Zaire
	? (?); ? (?)		? (?)	Stadium: Stade du 20 Mai

8 July 1979 Friendly	Zaire	4–1	Togo	Kinshasa, Zaire
	? (?); ? (?); ? (?); ? (?)		? (?)	Stadium: Stade du 20 Mai

15 July 1979 Friendly	Kenya	2–2	Zaire	Nairobi, Kenya
	? (?); ? (?)		? (?); ? (?)

25 July 1979 Friendly	Benin	0–1	Zaire	Porto-Novo, Benin
			? (?)

28 July 1979 Friendly	Benin	0–3	Zaire	Porto-Novo, Benin
			? (?); ? (?); ? (?)

5 August 1979 1980 CAN qualification	Zaire	3–2	Guinea	Kinshasa, Zaire
	Ayel 18', 81'; Kiyika 88'		Bangoura 42', 64'	Stadium: Stade du 20 Mai

19 August 1979 1980 CAN qualification	Guinea	3–1	Zaire	Conakry, Guinea
	? (?); ? (?); ? (?)		? (?)	Stadium: Stade du 28 Septembre

== 1980s ==
=== 1980 ===
25 June 1980 Friendly	Zaire	1–2	Congo	Kinshasa, Zaire
	? (?)		? (?); ? (?)	Stadium: Stade du 20 Mai

27 June 1980 Friendly	Zaire	1–1	Gabon	Kinshasa, Zaire
	? (?)		? (?)	Stadium: Stade du 20 Mai

13 July 1980 1982 FIFA WC qualification	Zaire	5–2	Mozambique	Kinshasa, Zaire
	Kiyika 30' (pen.), 82' (pen.); Muteba 67', 87'; Ilunga 85'		Guiamba (?)	Stadium: Stade du 20 Mai; Attendance: 34,871; Referee: Théodore Koudou Poll (Ivory Coast)

27 July 1980 1982 FIFA WC qualification	Mozambique	1–2	Zaire	Maputo, Mozambique
	Rui Marcos 55'		Muteba 15'; Mayélé 17'	Attendance: 50,000; Referee: Angelo Ratovonony (Madagascar)

16 November 1980 1982 FIFA WC qualification	Madagascar	1–1	Zaire	Antananarivo, Madagascar
	Kira 26'		Malgbanga 74'	Stadium: Mahamasina Municipal Stadium; Attendance: 12,191; Referee: Jean Cyril Monty (Mauritius)

23 November 1980 Friendly	Guinea	2–1	Zaire	Conakry, Guinea
	? (?); ? (?)		? (?)	Stadium: Stade du 28 Septembre

21 December 1980 1982 FIFA WC qualification	Zaire	3–2	Madagascar	Kinshasa, Zaire
	Suzeti 1'; Mayélé 26'; Malgbanga 75'		Tshikalu 19' (o.g.); Bin Amidou 39'	Stadium: Stade du 20 Mai; Attendance: 37,754; Referee: Joseph Blanchard-Angaud (PR Congo)

=== 1981 ===
5 April 1981 1982 CAN qualification	Zaire	2–1	Mozambique	Kinshasa, Zaire
	? (?); ? (?)		? (?)	Stadium: Stade du 20 Mai; Referee: Théodore Koudou Poll (Ivory Coast)

12 April 1981 1982 FIFA WC qualification	Zaire	1–0	Cameroon	Kinshasa, Zaire
	N'Kama 23'			Stadium: Stade du 20 Mai; Attendance: 80,000; Referee: Suleiman El-Naim (Sudan)

19 April 1981 1982 CAN qualification	Mozambique	3–3	Zaire	Maputo, Mozambique
	? (?); ? (?); ? (?)		? (?); ? (?); ? (?)	Referee: Angelo Ratovonony (Madagascar)

26 April 1981 1982 FIFA WC qualification	Cameroon	6–1	Zaire	Yaoundé, Cameroon
	Milla 3', 45', 90'; M'Bida 13'; Kundé 52', 67' (pen.)		N'Kama 53'	Stadium: Ahmadou Ahidjo Stadium; Attendance: 55,197; Referee: Aissaoui Boudabbous (Tunisia)

26 June 1981 Friendly	Zambia	3–1	Zaire	Lusaka, Zambia
	? (?); ? (?); ? (?)		? (?)

28 June 1981 Friendly	Zambia	2–2	Zaire	Lusaka, Zambia
	? (?); ? (?)		? (?); ? (?)

16 July 1981 Friendly	Benin	1–2	Zaire	Porto-Novo, Benin
	? (?)		? (?); ? (?)

22 July 1981 1982 CAN qualification	Ghana	2–2	Zaire	Accra, Ghana
	? (?); ? (?)		? (?); ? (?)

29 July 1981 Friendly	Congo	2–2	Zaire	Brazzaville, PR Congo
	? (?); ? (?)		? (?); ? (?)	Stadium: Stade de la Revolution

2 August 1981 1982 CAN qualification	Zaire	1–2	Ghana	Kinshasa, Zaire
	? (?)		? (?); ? (?)	Stadium: Stade du 20 Mai; Referee: Kabalamuna Chayu (Zambia)

23 August 1981 1981 Central African Games	Cameroon	0–2	Zaire	Luanda, Angola
			? (?); ? (?)

25 August 1981 1981 Central African Games	Gabon	1–1	Zaire	Luanda, Angola
	? (?)		? (?)

27 August 1981 1981 Central African Games	Congo	1–2	Zaire	Luanda, Angola
	? (?)		? (?); ? (?)

29 August 1981 1981 Central African Games	Angola	1–1	Zaire	Luanda, Angola
	? (?)		? (?)

=== 1982 ===
1982 1984 CAN qualification	Malawi	(w/o)	Zaire
			Withdrew

=== 1984 ===
8 January 1984 Friendly	Zaire	2–2	Cameroon	Kinshasa, Zaire
	? (?); ? (?)		? (?); ? (?)	Stadium: Stade du 20 Mai

11 November 1984 1986 CAN qualification	Zaire	2–0	Gabon	Kinshasa, Zaire
	? (?); ? (?)			Stadium: Stade du 20 Mai

25 November 1984 1986 CAN qualification	Gabon	1–1	Zaire	Libreville, Gabon
	Minko (?)		? (?)

=== 1985 ===
5 March 1985 Friendly	Ivory Coast	2–0	Zaire	Yamoussoukro, Ivory Coast
	? (?); ? (?)

31 March 1985 1986 CAN qualification	Congo	2–5	Zaire	Brazzaville, PR Congo
	Nis 42'; Nkounkou 80'		Santos 5'; Kabongo 15', 50'; Ngeleme 25'; Kiyika 28'	Stadium: Stade de la Revolution; Attendance: 20,000

14 April 1985 1986 CAN qualification	Zaire	0–0	Congo	Kinshasa, Zaire
				Stadium: Stade du 20 Mai

30 June 1985 1985 IOT	Réunion	1–2	Zaire	Saint-Denis, Réunion
	? (?)		? (?); ? (?)

2 July 1985 1985 IOT	Malawi	0–1	Zaire	Saint-Denis, Réunion
			? (?)

9 July 1985 Friendly	Kenya	0–1	Zaire	Nairobi, Kenya
			? (?)

25 August 1985 1986 CAN qualification	Morocco	1–0	Zaire	Casablanca, Morocco
	Merry 46' (pen.)			Stadium: Stade Mohammed V

8 September 1985 1986 CAN qualification	Zaire	0–0	Morocco	Lubumbashi, Zaire
				Stadium: Stade Municipal

19 November 1985 Mobutu 20th Anniversary	Zaire	0–1	Zambia	Kinshasa, Zaire
			? (?)	Stadium: Stade du 20 Mai

24 November 1985 Mobutu 20th Anniversary	Zaire	1–2	Ivory Coast	Kinshasa, Zaire
	? (?)		? (?); ? (?)	Stadium: Stade du 20 Mai

=== 1986 ===
27 September 1986 Friendly	Zambia	2–2	Zaire	Lusaka, Zambia
	? (?); ? (?)		? (?); ? (?)

28 September 1986 Friendly	Zambia	0–1	Zaire	Lusaka, Zambia
			? (?)

=== 1987 ===
18 March 1987 Friendly	Ivory Coast	2–1	Zaire	Yamoussoukro, Ivory Coast
	? (?); ? (?)		? (?)

22 March 1987 Friendly	Ivory Coast	1–3	Zaire	Yamoussoukro, Ivory Coast
	? (?)		Mangala (?)

29 March 1987 1988 CAN qualification	Zaire	3–0	Angola	Kinshasa, Zaire
	Tueba (?); Muntubila (?); Nkama (?)			Stadium: Stade du 20 Mai; Referee: Kabalamuna Chayu (Zambia)

11 April 1987 1988 CAN qualification	Angola	1–0	Zaire	Luanda, Angola
	Jesus 19' (pen.)			Referee: Gabriel Ondziel-Dinga (PR Congo)

21 April 1987 1987 Central African Games	Angola	2–1	Zaire	Brazzaville, PR Congo
	? (?); ? (?)		? (?)	Stadium: Stade de la Revolution

23 April 1987 1987 Central African Games	Congo	0–0	Zaire	Brazzaville, PR Congo
				Stadium: Stade de la Revolution

29 April 1987 1987 Central African Games	Chad	0–4	Zaire	Brazzaville, PR Congo
			? (?); ? (?); ? (?); ? (?)	Stadium: Stade de la Revolution

5 July 1987 1988 CAN qualification	Senegal	0–0	Zaire	Dakar, Senegal
				Stadium: Stade Demba Diop

19 July 1987 1988 CAN qualification	Zaire	0–0 (4–2 p)	Senegal	Kinshasa, Zaire
				Stadium: Stade du 20 Mai; Attendance: 80,000

=== 1988 ===
13 March 1988 1988 CAN group stage	Morocco	1–1	Zaire	Casablanca, Morocco
	Merry 43' (pen.)	Report	Lutonadio 88'	Stadium: Stade Mohammed V Attendance: 80,000; Referee: Gebreyesus Tesfaye (Ethiopia)

16 March 1988 1988 CAN group stage	Ivory Coast	1–1	Zaire	Casablanca, Morocco
	Traoré 74'	Report	Kabongo 37'	Stadium: Stade Mohammed V Attendance: 45,000; Referee: Bin Nasser (Tunisia)

19 March 1988 1988 CAN group stage	Algeria	1–0	Zaire	Casablanca, Morocco
	Ferhaoui 36'	Report		Stadium: Stade Mohammed V Attendance: 80,000; Referee: Mongbo (Benin)

13 November 1988 Friendly	Zaire	1–0	Congo	Kinshasa, Zaire
	? (?)			Stadium: Stade du 20 Mai

31 December 1988 Friendly	Zaire	0–0	Angola	Kinshasa, Zaire
				Stadium: Stade du 20 Mai

=== 1989 ===
8 January 1989 1990 FIFA WC qualification	Zaire	3–1	Tunisia	Kinshasa, Zaire
	Mapuata 23', 33'; Wawa 61'		Limam 7'	Stadium: Stade du 20 Mai; Attendance: 21,900; Referee: Tadesse Degefa (Ethiopia)

22 January 1989 1990 FIFA WC qualification	Zambia	4–2	Zaire	Lusaka, Zambia
	Nyirenda 10'; Msiska 17'; Makinka 25'; Bwalya 75'		Kabongo 29', 78'	Stadium: Independence Stadium; Attendance: 50,000; Referee: Sydney Picon-Ackong (Mauritius)

29 January 1989 Friendly	Senegal	1–1	Zaire	Dakar, Senegal
	? (?)		? (?)	Stadium: Stade Demba Diop

31 January 1989 Friendly	Senegal	2–1	Zaire	Dakar, Senegal
	? (?); ? (?)		? (?)	Stadium: Stade Demba Diop

1989 1990 CAN qualification	Zaire	(w/o)	Sierra Leone
			Withdrew

1 June 1989 Friendly	Ivory Coast	1–1	Zaire	Yamoussoukro, Ivory Coast
	? (?)		? (?)

4 June 1989 Friendly	Gabon	0–0	Zaire	Libreville, Gabon

11 June 1989 1990 FIFA WC qualification	Zaire	0–0	Morocco	Kinshasa, Zaire
				Stadium: Stade du 20 Mai; Attendance: 50,000; Referee: Badara Sène (Senegal)

25 June 1989 1990 FIFA WC qualification	Tunisia	1–0	Zaire	Tunis, Tunisia
	Maâloul 74' (pen.)			Stadium: Stade El Menzah; Attendance: 25,000; Referee: Mohamed Hansal (Algeria)

10 July 1989 Friendly	Kenya	1–0	Zaire	Nairobi, Kenya
	? (?)

16 July 1989 1990 CAN qualification	Egypt	2–0	Zaire	Cairo, Egypt
	Hassan 57'; Shawky 67'			Stadium: Cairo International Stadium; Attendance: 90,000; Referee: Abdelali Naciri (Morocco)

30 July 1989 1990 CAN qualification	Zaire	0–0	Egypt	Kinshasa, Zaire
				Stadium: Stade du 20 Mai; Referee: Badou Jasseh (Gambia)

13 August 1989 1990 FIFA WC qualification	Zaire	1–0	Zambia	Kinshasa, Zaire
	Kabongo			Stadium: Stade du 20 Mai; Attendance: 80,000; Referee: Mohamed Mohamed Hafez (Egypt)

27 August 1989 1990 FIFA WC qualification	Morocco	1–1	Zaire	Kenitra, Morocco
	Madih 58'		Makukula 47'	Stadium: Stade Municipal; Attendance: 1,839; Referee: Abderrahmane Bergui (Algeria)

== 1990s ==
=== 1990 ===
4 August 1990 Friendly	Malawi	1–0	Zaire	Lilongwe, Malawi
	? (?)

6 August 1990 Friendly	Malawi	1–0	Zaire	Lilongwe, Malawi
	? (?)

8 August 1990 Friendly	Malawi	0–0	Zaire	Lilongwe, Malawi

12 August 1990 Friendly	Zambia	0–0	Zaire	Lusaka, Zambia
				Stadium: Independence Stadium

19 August 1990 1992 CAN qualification	Zaire	2–0	Tanzania	Kinshasa, Zaire
	Kabongo 6', 75'			Stadium: Stade du 20 Mai; Attendance: 50,000; Referee: William Ochieng (Kenya)

2 September 1990 1992 CAN qualification	Uganda	2–1	Zaire	Kampala, Uganda
	Senoga 8'; Musisi 62'		Kabongo 18'	Stadium: Nakivubo Stadium; Attendance: 20,000; Referee: Sylvanus Anthony Oghina (Kenya)

=== 1991 ===
14 April 1991 1992 CAN qualification	Zaire	2–1	Gabon	Kinshasa, Zaire
	N'Galula 70'; Mukanya 85'		Nzamba 74'	Stadium: Stade du 20 Mai; Attendance: 18,000; Referee: Laurent Pettcha (Cameroon)

27 April 1991 1992 CAN qualification	Tanzania	1–0	Zaire	Dar es Salaam, Tanzania
	Haule 63'			Stadium: Tanzania National Stadium; Attendance: 15,000; Referee: Charles Masembe (Uganda)

9 July 1991 Friendly	Congo	0–0	Zaire	Brazzaville, PR Congo
				Stadium: Stade de la Revolution

14 July 1991 1992 CAN qualification	Zaire	1–0	Uganda	Kinshasa, Zaire
	Balenga 82' (pen.)			Stadium: Stade du 20 Mai; Attendance: 70,000; Referee: ? (Cameroon)

28 July 1991 1992 CAN qualification	Gabon	0–0	Zaire	Libreville, Gabon
				Stadium: Stade Omar Bongo; Attendance: 50,000; Referee: Simon Bantsimba (PR Congo)

=== 1992 ===
5 January 1992 Friendly	Ivory Coast	0–2	Zaire	Dakar, Senegal
			? (?); ? (?)	Stadium: Stade de l'Amitie

14 January 1992 1992 CAN group stage	Morocco	1–1	Zaire	Dakar, Senegal
	Rokbi 89'		N'Gole 90'	Stadium: Stade de l'Amitie; Attendance: 5,000

16 January 1992 1992 CAN group stage	Cameroon	1–1	Zaire	Dakar, Senegal
	Omam-Biyik 15'		Tueba 1'	Stadium: Stade de l'Amitie; Attendance: 10,000

19 January 1992 1992 CAN group quarterfinals	Nigeria	1–0	Zaire	Dakar, Senegal
	Yekini 22'			Stadium: Stade de l'Amitie; Attendance: 35,000; Referee: Idrissa Sarr (Mauritania)

16 August 1992 1994 CAN qualification	Zaire	2–0	Mozambique	Kinshasa, Zaire
	Kabongo 20', 85'			Stadium: Kamanyola Stadium; Attendance: 32,000

29 August 1992 1994 CAN qualification	Kenya	1–3	Zaire	Nairobi, Kenya
	Nachok 55'		N'Gole 32'; Bapupa 49'; Okitakatshi 57'	Stadium: Nyayo National Stadium; Referee: Joel Mondoka (Zambia)

11 October 1992 1994 FIFA WC qualification	Zaire	4–2 (Note: Match result later annulled by FIFA.)	Liberia	Kinshasa, Zaire
	Kabongo 39', 50'; Lukaku 72', 85'		Sebwe 32'; Sogbie 55'	Stadium: Stade du 20 Mai; Attendance: Jean-Fidèle Diramba (Gabon; Referee: 28,238

25 October 1992 1994 FIFA WC qualification	Swaziland	1–0	Zaire	Lobamba, Swaziland
	Terblanche 85'			Stadium: Somhlolo National Stadium; Attendance: 8,000; Referee: Haroun Onderah (Kenya)

=== 1993 ===
10 January 1993 1994 FIFA WC qualification	Zaire	1–2	Cameroon	Kinshasa, Zaire
	Katschi 85' (pen.)		Ebongué 50'; Tchami 60'	Stadium: Stade du 20 Mai; Attendance: 28,941; Referee: Joel Dwarf Mondoka (Zambia)

17 January 1993 1994 FIFA WC qualification	Liberia	Not played	Zaire	Liberia

31 January 1993 1994 FIFA WC qualification	Zaire	Not played	Swaziland	Kinshasa, Zaire
				Stadium: Stade du 20 Mai; Referee: Bantsimba (Republic of the Congo)

1 March 1993 1994 FIFA WC qualification	Cameroon	0–0	Zaire	Yaoundé, Cameroon
				Stadium: Stade Omnisports; Attendance: 10,000; Referee: Anthony Edusah (Ghana)

11 April 1993 1994 CAN qualification	Lesotho	1–1	Zaire	Maseru, Lesotho
	? (?)		? (?)	Stadium: Setsoto Stadium

25 April 1993 1994 CAN qualification	Mozambique	0–0	Zaire	Maputo, Mozambique
				Stadium: Estádio da Machava

11 July 1993 1994 CAN qualification	Zaire	0–1	Kenya	Kinshasa, Zaire
			Nachok 30'	Stadium: Kamanyola Stadium

25 July 1993 1994 CAN qualification	Zaire	7–0	Lesotho	Kinshasa, Zaire
	Nganzadi 7'; Masudi 18', 36', 79'; Lukaku 42', 77'; Simba 48'			Stadium: Kamanyola Stadium

=== 1994 ===
12 March 1994 Friendly	Congo	2–1	Zaire	Brazzaville, Republic of the Congo
	? (?); ? (?)		? (?)	Stadium: Stade Alphonse Massemba-Débat

15 March 1994 Friendly	Gabon	2–1	Zaire	Libreville, Gabon
	? (?); ? (?)		? (?)	Stadium: Stade Omar Bongo

28 March 1994 1994 CAN group stage	Mali	0–1	Zaire	Tunis, Tunisia
			Lemba 45'	Stadium: Stade El Menzah; Attendance: 8,000; Referee: Ali Bujsaim (United Arab Emirates)

30 March 1994 1994 CAN group stage	Tunisia	1–1	Zaire	Tunis, Tunisia
	Rouissi 43' (pen.)		Nsumbu 55'	Stadium: Stade El Menzah; Attendance: 45,000; Referee: Jamal Al Sharif (Syria)

2 April 1994 1994 CAN group quarterfinals	Zaire	0–2	Nigeria	Tunis, Tunisia
			Yekini 51', 71' (pen.)	Stadium: Stade El Menzah; Attendance: 2,000; Referee: Lim Kee Chong (Mauritius)

19 August 1994 Friendly	Congo	2–0	Zaire	Brazzaville, Republic of the Congo
	? (?); ? (?)			Stadium: Stade Alphonse Massemba-Débat

24 August 1994 Friendly	Zaire	2–0	Congo	Kinshasa, Zaire
	? (?); ? (?)			Stadium: Kamanyola Stadium

26 August 1994 Friendly	Zaire	1–1	Congo	Kinshasa, Zaire
	? (?)		? (?)	Stadium: Kamanyola Stadium

4 September 1994 1996 CAN qualification	Zaire	1–1	Malawi	Kinshasa, Zaire
	Essende 80'		Maduka 85'	Stadium: Kamanyola Stadium; Attendance: 50,000; Referee: Pierre Alain Mounguengui (Gabon)

16 October 1994 1996 CAN qualification	Cameroon	1–0	Zaire	Douala, Cameroon
	Mouyémé 2'			Stadium: Stade de la Réunification; Attendance: 20,000

13 November 1994 1996 CAN qualification	Zimbabwe	2–1	Zaire	Harare, Zimbabwe
	A. Ndlovu 52'; P. Ndlovu 89' (pen.)		Essende 66'	Stadium: National Sports Stadium; Attendance: 45,000; Referee: Christian Chikuka (Zambia)

=== 1995 ===
8 January 1995 1996 CAN qualification	Zaire	3–0	Lesotho	Kinshasa, Zaire
	Lukaku 1' (pen.); Mukanya 37'; Mbiyavanga 82'			Stadium: Kamanyola Stadium; Attendance: 35,000

22 January 1995 1996 CAN qualification	Swaziland	Not played	Zaire	Swaziland

9 April 1995 1996 CAN qualification	Malawi	0–1	Zaire	Lilongwe, Malawi
			Essende 11'	Stadium: Silver Stadium; Attendance: 20,000

23 April 1995 1996 CAN qualification	Zaire	2–1	Cameroon	Kinshasa, Zaire
	Mbote 75'; N'Gole 82'		Mouyémé 68'	Stadium: Kamanyola Stadium; Attendance: 45,000; Referee: Kouakou N'Dri (Ivory Coast)

4 June 1995 1996 CAN qualification	Zaire	5–0	Zimbabwe	Kinshasa, Zaire
	Kiniambi 26'; Lembi 29', 35', 55'; Mpia 77'			Stadium: Kamanyola Stadium; Attendance: 50,000

16 July 1995 1996 CAN qualification	Zaire	Not played	Swaziland	Zaire

30 July 1995 1996 CAN qualification	Lesotho	Not played	Zaire	Lesotho

12 December 1995 Friendly	Zaire	2–2	Congo	Kinshasa, Zaire
	? (?); ? (?)		? (?); ? (?)	Stadium: Kamanyola Stadium

=== 1996 ===
16 January 1996 1996 CAN group stage	Zaire	Not played	Nigeria	Johannesburg, South Africa
				Stadium: FNB Stadium

19 January 1996 1996 CAN group stage	Gabon	2–0	Zaire	Durban, South Africa
	Mackaya 21' (pen.); Bekogo 34'			Stadium: Kings Park Stadium; Attendance: 4,000; Referee: Omer Yengo (Republic of the Congo)

25 January 1996 1996 CAN group stage	Zaire	2–0	Liberia	Johannesburg, South Africa
	Lukaku 5' (pen.); Essende 72'			Stadium: FNB Stadium; Attendance: 3,000; Referee: Said Belqola (Morocco)

28 January 1996 1996 CAN group quarterfinals	Ghana	1–0	Zaire	Port Elizabeth, South Africa
	Yeboah 22'	Report		Stadium: EPRU Stadium; Attendance: 8,000; Referee: Sidi Bekaye Magassa (Mali)

8 April 1996 Friendly	Congo	2–1	Zaire	Brazzaville, Republic of the Congo
	? (?); ? (?)		? (?)	Stadium: Stade Alphonse Massemba-Débat

28 April 1996 Friendly	Zaire	1–3	Congo	Kinshasa, Zaire
	? (?)		? (?); ? (?); ? (?)	Stadium: Kamanyola Stadium

2 June 1996 1998 FIFA WC qualification	Mauritius	1–5	Zaire	Port Louis, Mauritius
	Mocude 64'	Report	Mamale 1'; Ngonge 15'; Tondelva 60'; Elonga-Ekakia 77', 2'	Stadium: Anjalay Stadium; Attendance: 2,448; Referee: Eric Hubert (Réunion)

16 June 1996 1998 FIFA WC qualification	Zaire	2–0	Mauritius	Kinshasa, Zaire
	Ngonge 45'; Tondelva 90'	Report		Stadium: Kamanyola Stadium; Attendance: 80,000; Referee: Jean-Fidèle Diramba (Gabon)

29 August 1996 Friendly	Morocco	7–0	Zaire	Settat, Morocco
	Hadji 22'; Fertout 24', 32', 90'; Nader 36'; Raghib 70'; Abrami 72' (pen.)	Report		Stadium: Stade Mohammed V Attendance: 10,000; Referee: Abderrahim El Arjoune (Morocco)

6 October 1996 1998 CAN qualification	Zaire	0–0	Liberia	Kinshasa, Zaire
				Stadium: Kamanyola Stadium; Attendance: 75,000

9 November 1996 1998 FIFA WC qualification	South Africa	1–0	Zaire	Johannesburg, South Africa
15:00	Masinga 67'	Report		Stadium: FNB Stadium; Attendance: 55,000; Referee: Said Belqola (Morocco)

=== 1997 ===
12 January 1997 1998 FIFA WC qualification	Zaire	1–1	Congo	Kinshasa, Zaire
15:30	Lembi 13'	Report	Bongo 4'	Stadium: Kamanyola Stadium; Attendance: 60,000; Referee: Lucien Bouchardeau (Niger)

26 January 1997 1998 CAN qualification	Tanzania	1–2	Zaire	Dar es Salaam, Tanzania
	Kizito 79'		Mbayo 52'; Kayu 85'	Stadium: Tanzania National Stadium; Attendance: 12,000

23 February 1997 1998 CAN qualification	Togo	1–1	Zaire	Lomé, Togo
	Noutsoudje 90'		Simba 26'	Stadium: Stade Municipal; Attendance: 20,000; Referee: Yahya Hadqa (Morocco)

9 April 1997 1998 FIFA WC qualification	Zaire	2–2	Zambia	Harare, Zimbabwe
15:00	N'tsunda 29'; Bazamba 51'	Report	Malitoli 22'; Tembo 81'	Stadium: National Sports Stadium; Attendance: 20,000; Referee: Lim Kee Chong (Mauritius)

27 April 1997 1998 FIFA WC qualification	Zaire	1–2	South Africa	Lomé, Togo
15:30	Tumba 26'	Report	Khumalo 21'; Masinga 66'	Stadium: Stade de Kégué; Attendance: 7,000; Referee: Emmanuel Obafemi (Nigeria)

== Head-to-head records ==
Key
Positive balance (more Wins)
Neutral balance (Wins = Losses)
Negative balance (more Losses)

Head-to-head records (excluding walk-overs)
Opponent	Pld	W	D	L	GF	GA	W%	D%	L%
Algeria	1	0	0	1	0	1	0	0	100
Angola	5	1	2	2	5	4	20	40	40
Benin	3	3	0	0	6	1	100	0	0
Brazil	1	0	0	1	0	3	0	0	100
Burundi	1	1	0	0	1	0	100	0	0
Cameroon	17	6	3	8	20	25	35.29	17.65	47.06
Chad	1	1	0	0	4	0	100	0	0
China	1	0	0	1	2	3	0	0	100
Congo	19	5	7	7	25	26	26.32	36.84	36.84
Egypt	4	1	1	2	5	7	25	25	50
Gabon	10	2	6	2	9	9	20	60	20
Ghana	5	1	2	2	7	7	20	40	40
Guinea	5	3	0	2	13	8	60	0	40
Iran	2	1	0	1	4	4	50	0	50
Ivory Coast	5	2	2	1	8	5	40	40	20
Kenya	4	1	1	2	5	5	25	25	50
Lesotho	3	2	1	0	11	1	66.67	33.33	0
Liberia	3	2	1	0	6	2	66.67	33.33	0
Libya	1	1	0	0	2	0	100	0	0
Madagascar	2	1	1	0	4	3	50	50	0
Malawi	5	1	3	1	2	3	20	60	20
Mali	2	1	0	1	4	4	50	0	50
Mauritius	3	3	0	0	11	2	100	0	0
Morocco	7	1	4	2	6	11	14.29	71.43	28.57
Mozambique	6	4	2	0	14	7	66.67	33.33	0
Nigeria	3	0	0	3	2	7	0	0	100
Rwanda	1	1	0	0	6	1	100	0	0
Scotland	1	0	0	1	0	2	0	0	100
Senegal	6	1	3	2	5	6	16.67	50	33.33
South Africa	2	0	0	2	2	4	0	0	100
Sudan	2	0	2	0	2	2	0	100	0
Swaziland	1	0	0	1	0	1	0	0	100
Tanzania	3	2	0	1	4	2	66.67	0	33.33
Togo	4	2	2	0	9	2	50	50	0
Tunisia	3	1	1	1	4	3	33.33	33.33	33.33
Uganda	3	2	0	1	4	3	66.67	0	33.33
Upper Volta (Note: Modern day Burkina Faso)	4	4	0	0	15	3	100	0	0
Yugoslavia	1	0	0	1	0	9	0	0	100
Zambia	11	4	4	3	17	16	36.36	36.36	27.27
Zimbabwe	2	1	0	1	6	2	50	0	50
Totals	163	62	48	53	250	204	38.04	29.45	32.52
