= 1998 FIFA World Cup qualification (CAF) =

Tournament details
- Dates: 31 May 1996 – 17 August 1997
- Teams: 36 (from 1 confederation)

Tournament statistics
- Matches played: 91
- Goals scored: 229 (2.52 per match)
- Attendance: 2,810,227 (30,882 per match)
- Top scorer(s): (Angola) Paulão (Burkina Faso) Mamadou Zongo (Kenya) Mike Okoth Origi (Zimbabwe) Vitalis Takawira (5 goals each)

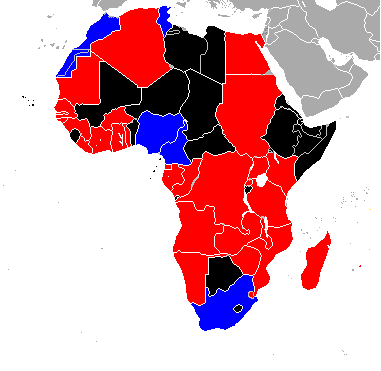
Result: Countries that qualified for the 1998 FIFA World Cup Countries that did not qualify for the 1998 FIFA World Cup Countries that did not enter, withdrew or were disqualified

Listed below are the dates and results for the 1998 FIFA World Cup qualification rounds for the African zone (CAF). For an overview of the qualification rounds, see the article 1998 FIFA World Cup qualification.

A total of 38 CAF teams entered the competition. However, Mali and Niger both withdrew before the draw was made. The African Zone was allocated five places (out of 32) in the final tournament.

== Summary ==
There would be two rounds of play:

- First round: Cameroon, Nigeria, Morocco and Egypt, the four highest-ranked teams according to FIFA, received byes and advanced to the final round directly. The remaining 32 teams were paired up to play knockout matches on a home-and-away basis. The winners advanced to the final round.
- Final round: The 20 teams were divided into five groups of four teams each. The teams played against each other on a home-and-away basis. The group winners qualified. These were:
  - Tunisia
  - Cameroon
  - Morocco
  - Nigeria
  - South Africa

== First round ==
Team 1	Agg.	Team 2	1st leg	2nd leg
Mauritania	0–2	Burkina Faso	0–0	0–2
Namibia	3–1	Mozambique	2–0	1–1
Malawi	0–4	South Africa	0–1	0–3
Uganda	1–5	Angola	0–2	1–3
Guinea-Bissau	4–5	Guinea	3–2	1–3
Gambia	2–5	Liberia	2–1	0–4
Swaziland	0–3	Gabon	0–1	0–2
Burundi	2–0	Sierra Leone	1–0	1–0
Madagascar	3–4	Zimbabwe	1–2	2–2
Congo	3–1	Ivory Coast	2–0	1–1
Mauritius	1–7	Zaire	1–5	0–2
Rwanda	1–5	Tunisia	1–3	0–2
Kenya	3–2	Algeria	3–1	0–1
Togo	3–2	Senegal	2–1	1–1
Sudan	2–3	Zambia	2–0	0–3
Tanzania	1–2	Ghana	0–0	1–2

=== First leg ===
31 May 1996
17:00

Mauritania	0–0	Burkina Faso
	Report

Stade National, Nouakchott
Attendance: 15,000
Referee: Alhagi Ibrahima Faye (Togo)

1 June 1996
15:00

Namibia	2–0	Mozambique
Hoeseb 28'; Ortmann 80'	Report

Independence Stadium, Windhoek
Attendance: 5,000
Referee: Antonio Augusto Silva (Angola)

1 June 1996
15:00

Malawi	0–1	South Africa
	Report	Tinkler 21'

Chichiri Stadium, Blantyre
Attendance: 55,000
Referee: Charles Masembe (Uganda)

1 June 1996
16:30

Uganda	0–2	Angola
	Report	Da Silva 35' (pen.); Paulão 60' (pen.)

Nakivubo Stadium, Kampala
Attendance: 12,000
Referee: Isaack Omar Abdulkadir (Tanzania)

1 June 1996
16:30

Guinea-Bissau	3–2	Guinea
Tavares 11', 36'; C. Có 60' (pen.)	Report	Camara 53', 54'

Estádio 24 de Setembro, Bissau
Attendance: 15,000
Referee: Falla N'Doye (Senegal)

1 June 1996
17:00

Gambia	2–1	Liberia
Corr 18' (pen.); Sillah 58'	Report	Debbah 35' (pen.)

Independence Stadium, Bakau
Attendance: 2,000
Referee: Mamadouba Camara (Guinea)

2 June 1996
15:30

Swaziland	0–1	Gabon
	Report	Ogandaga 5'

Somhlolo National Stadium, Lobamba
Attendance: 10,000
Referee: Feliz Onias Tangawarima (Mozambique)

2 June 1996
15:00

Burundi	1–0	Sierra Leone
Wambo 85'	Report

Prince Louis Rwagasore Stadium, Bujumbura
Attendance: 6,000
Referee: Ahmed Salih Salah (Sudan)

2 June 1996
15:00

Madagascar	1–2	Zimbabwe
Raoelijaona 85'	Report	Sawu 79'; Takawira 89'

Antananarivo
Attendance: 30,000
Referee: Lim Kee Chong (Mauritius)

2 June 1996
15:30

Congo	2–0	Ivory Coast
Niere 42'; Miyamou 89'	Report

Stade Alphonse Massemba-Débat, Brazzaville
Attendance: 6,000
Referee: Aka Amuam (Cameroon)

2 June 1996
15:00

Mauritius	1–5	Zaire
Mocude 64'	Report	Emeka 1'; Ngonge 15'; Tondelua 60'; Elonga-Ekakia 77', 82'

Stade Anjalay, Port Louis
Attendance: 2,448
Referee: Eric Hubert (Reunion)

2 June 1996
15:30

Rwanda	1–3	Tunisia
Mupenzi 48'	Report	Sellimi 43' (pen.), 47'; Ben Slimane 60'

Stade Régional Nyamirambo, Kigali City
Attendance: 8,000
Referee: Bisingu-Wabelo Buenkadila (Zaire)

2 June 1996
16:00

Kenya	3–1	Algeria
Kwarula 58'; Motego 63' (pen.); Otieno 87'	Report	Zerrouki 78'

Moi International Sports Centre, Nairobi
Attendance: 30,000
Referee: Kine Tebebu (Ethiopia)

2 June 1996
16:00

Togo	2–1	Senegal
Oyawolé 31'; Noutsoudje 88'	Report	Traoré 80'

Stade de Kégué, Lomé
Attendance: 20,000
Referee: Emmanuel Okoampah (Ghana)

1 June 1996
19:00

Sudan	2–0	Zambia
Khalid Ahmed Elmustafa 12'; Anas Elnour 52'	Report

Al-Hilal Stadium, Khartoum
Attendance: 11,983
Referee: Martin Omondi Bita (Kenya)

8 June 1996
16:00

Tanzania	0–0	Ghana
	Report

National Stadium, Dar es Salaam
Attendance: 15,000
Referee: Charles Baku Ndukize (Burundi)

=== Second leg ===
16 June 1996
16:00

Burkina Faso	2–0	Mauritania
Ouédraogo 44'; Traore 81'	Report

Stade du 4 Août, Ouagadougou
Attendance: 13,000
Referee: Sylvain Abikanlou (Benin)

Burkina Faso won 2–0 on aggregate

16 June 1996
14:30

Mozambique	1–1	Namibia
Macamo 25'	Report	Khob 84'

Estádio da Machava, Maputo
Attendance: 20,000
Referee: Milson Bahirah Jaky (Madagascar)

Namibia won 3–1 on aggregate

15 June 1996
15:00

South Africa	3–0	Malawi
Bartlett 4', 42'; Fish 38'	Report

FNB Stadium, Johannesburg
Attendance: 30,000
Referee: Edwin Mmonwagotlhe Senai (Botswana)

South Africa won 4–0 on aggregate

16 June 1996
15:30

Angola	3–1	Uganda
Paulão 1', 58'; Paulo Silva 7'	Report	Robert Kizito 3'

Estádio da Cidadela, Luanda
Attendance: 30,000
Referee: Goshen Hatimbula (Zambia)

Angola won 5–1 on aggregate

16 June 1996
16:30

Guinea	3–1	Guinea-Bissau
Soumah 33', 59'; Bangoura 61'	Report	N. Có 47'

Stade du 28 Septembre, Conakry
Attendance: 15,000
Referee: Moussa Kanoute (Mali)

Guinea won 5–4 on aggregate

23 June 1996
17:00

Liberia	4–0	Gambia
Clarke 25'; Weah 79'; Makor 87'; Debbah 90'	Report

Accra Sports Stadium, Accra
Attendance: 7,609
Referee: Samuel Kamara (Sierra Leone)

Liberia won 5–2 on aggregate

16 June 1996
16:00

Gabon	2–0	Swaziland
Mackaya 28'; Ngoukou 56'	Report

Stade Omar Bongo, Libreville
Attendance: 11,625
Referee: Omer Yengo (Congo)

Gabon won 3–0 on aggregate

16 June 1996
16:30

Sierra Leone	0–1	Burundi
	Report	Mbuyi 30'

National Stadium, Freetown
Attendance: 40,000
Referee: Olufemi Orimison Olaniyan (Nigeria)

Burundi won 2–0 on aggregate but withdrew before the Final Round started, so their place was given to Sierra Leone.

16 June 1996
15:00

Zimbabwe	2–2	Madagascar
Zviripayi 52'; Takawira 69'	Report	R. Rasoanaivo 23'; H. Rasoanaivo 67'

National Sports Stadium, Harare
Attendance: 36,885
Referee: Ian McLeod (South Africa)

Zimbabwe won 4–3 on aggregate

16 June 1996
15:30

Ivory Coast	1–1	Congo
Dao 29'	Report	Imboula 85'

Stade Félix Houphouët-Boigny, Abidjan
Attendance: 20,000
Referee: Gamal Al-Ghandour (Egypt)

Congo won 3–1 on aggregate

16 June 1996
15:30

Zaire	2–0	Mauritius
Ngonge 45'; Tondelua 90'	Report

Stade Kamanyola, Kinshasa
Attendance: 80,000
Referee: Jean-Fidèle Diramba (Gabon)

Zaire won 7–1 on aggregate

16 June 1996
17:00

Tunisia	2–0	Rwanda
Berkhissa 17'; Sellimi 46' (pen.)	Report

Stade El Menzah, Tunis
Attendance: 18,000
Referee: Mohamed Kouradji (Algeria)

Tunisia won 5–1 on aggregate

14 June 1996
17:00

Algeria	1–0	Kenya
Tasfaout 81'	Report

Stade 5 Juillet 1962, Algiers
Attendance: 25,000
Referee: Sahli Ferid (Tunisia)

Kenya won 3–2 on aggregate

16 June 1996
16:30

Senegal	1–1	Togo
Diallo 30'	Report	Gnavor 85'

Stade Leopold Senghor, Dakar
Attendance: 15,000
Referee: Lassana Gassama (Mauritania)

Togo won 3–2 on aggregate

16 June 1996
15:00

Zambia	3–0	Sudan
Lota 13'; Mutale 35'; Tembo 76'	Report

Independence Stadium, Lusaka
Attendance: 19,000
Referee: Wallace Mabuza (Swaziland)

Zambia won 3–2 on aggregate

17 June 1996
15:00

Ghana	2–1	Tanzania
Johnson 70'; Augustine 81'	Report	Daima 71'

Kumasi Sports Stadium, Kumasi
Attendance: 45,000
Referee: Lucien Bouchardeau (Niger)

Ghana won 2–1 on aggregate

== Final round ==
Key:

- Teams highlighted in green qualified for the finals.

=== Group 1 ===
Team	Pld	W	D	L	GF	GA	GD	Pts
Nigeria	6	4	1	1	10	4	6	13
Guinea	6	4	0	2	10	5	5	12
Kenya	6	3	1	2	11	12	−1	10
Burkina Faso	6	0	0	6	7	17	−10	0

9 November 1996
16:00

Nigeria	2–0	Burkina Faso
Amokachi 46', 77'	Report

Lagos National Stadium, Lagos
Attendance: 55,000
Referee: Omer Yengo (Congo)

10 November 1996
16:30

Guinea	3–1	Kenya
T. Camara 17'; F. Camara 34'; Soumah 82'	Report	Okoth 12'

Stade du 28 Septembre, Conakry
Attendance: 30,000
Referee: Mohamed Kouradji (Algeria)

12 January 1997
16:00

Kenya	1–1	Nigeria
Simiyu 22'	Report	Akpoborie 48'

Moi International Sports Centre, Nairobi
Attendance: 60,000
Referee: Abdul Rahman Al-Zaid (Saudi Arabia)

12 January 1997
15:30

Burkina Faso	0–2	Guinea
	Report	Oularé 17'; Soumah 44'

Stade du 4 Août, Ouagadougou
Attendance: 28,000
Referee: Zeli Sinko (Ivory Coast)

5 April 1997
16:00

Nigeria	2–1	Guinea
Amokachi 66', 67'	Report	T. Camara 87'

Lagos National Stadium, Lagos
Attendance: 40,000
Referee: Said Belqola (Morocco)

6 April 1997
16:00

Kenya	4–3	Burkina Faso
Okoth 55', 75', 85', 87'	Report	Zongo 12', 70'; F. Sanou 42' (pen.)

Moi International Sports Centre, Nairobi
Attendance: 35,000
Referee: Sahli Ferid (Tunisia)

27 April 1997
16:00

Burkina Faso	1–2	Nigeria
Zongo 76'	Report	Adepoju 42'; Amunike 58'

Stade du 4 Août, Ouagadougou
Attendance: 12,224
Referee: Sahli Ferid (Tunisia)

27 April 1997
16:00

Kenya	1–0	Guinea
Otieno 3'	Report

Moi International Sports Centre, Nairobi
Attendance: 50,000
Referee: Charles Masembe (Uganda)

7 June 1997
16:00

Nigeria	3–0	Kenya
Oliseh 13'; Amunike 43'; Oruma 83'	Report

Lagos National Stadium, Lagos
Attendance: 25,000
Referee: Lim Kee Chong (Mauritius)

8 June 1997
16:00

Guinea	3–1	Burkina Faso
F. Camara 9' (pen.); Balma 27' (o.g.); Oulare 54'	Report	Zongo 8'

Stade du 28 Septembre, Conakry
Attendance: 7,000
Referee: Omer Yengo (Congo)

16 August 1997
16:00

Burkina Faso	2–4	Kenya
Zongo 16'; O. Sanou 80'	Report	Simiyu 8'; Were 44'; Sunguti 70', 75'

Stade Municipal, Bobo Dioulasso
Attendance: 10,000
Referee: Coffi Codjia (Benin)

16 August 1997
16:30

Guinea	1–0	Nigeria
F. Camara 50'	Report

Stade du 28 Septembre, Conakry
Attendance: 25,000
Referee: Alex Quartey (Ghana)

=== Group 2 ===
Team	Pld	W	D	L	GF	GA	GD	Pts
Tunisia	6	5	1	0	10	1	9	16
Egypt	6	3	1	2	15	5	10	10
Liberia	6	1	1	4	2	10	−8	4
Namibia	6	1	1	4	6	17	−11	4

8 November 1996
15:15

Egypt	7–1	Namibia
Maher 1', 15', 69'; A. Hassan 11'; I. Hassan 34'; H. Hassan 72', 83'	Report	Shivute 24'

Cairo International Stadium, Cairo
Attendance: 35,000
Referee: Sidi Magassa (Mali)

10 November 1996
15:00

Liberia	0–1	Tunisia
	Report	Jelassi 87'

Accra Sports Stadium, Accra
Attendance: 25,000
Referee: Jean-Fidèle Diramba (Gabon)

11 January 1997
16:00

Namibia	0–0	Liberia
	Report

Independence Stadium, Windhoek
Attendance: 12,000
Referee: Petros Mathabela (South Africa)

12 January 1997
14:00

Tunisia	1–0	Egypt
Baya 10'	Report

Stade El Menzah, Tunis
Attendance: 35,000
Referee: Masayoshi Okada (Japan)

6 April 1997
15:00

Liberia	1–0	Egypt
Weah 29'	Report

Accra Sports Stadium, Accra
Attendance: 15,000
Referee: Zeli Sinko (Ivory Coast)

6 April 1997
15:00

Namibia	1–2	Tunisia
Ouseb 74'	Report	Herichi 15'; Badra 68'

Independence Stadium, Windhoek
Attendance: 25,000
Referee: Milson Jaky (Madagascar)

26 April 1997
15:00

Namibia	2–3	Egypt
Uutoni 62'; Ouseb 87' (pen.)	Report	H. Hassan 77', 89'; Khashaba 79' (pen.)

Independence Stadium, Windhoek
Attendance: 6,000
Referee: Amuam Aka (Cameroon)

27 April 1997
16:00

Tunisia	2–0	Liberia
Sellimi 66'; Badra 75'	Report

Stade El Menzah, Tunis
Attendance: 40,000
Referee: Mamadouba Camara (Guinea)

8 June 1997
15:00

Liberia	1–2	Namibia
Daye 5'	Report	Shivute 35'; Uri Khob 82'

Accra Sports Stadium, Accra
Attendance: 11,960
Referee: Jean-Fidèle Diramba (Gabon)

8 June 1997
20:15

Egypt	0–0	Tunisia
	Report

Cairo International Stadium, Cairo
Attendance: 46,000
Referee: Karim Daho (Algeria)

17 August 1997
20:15

Egypt	5–0	Liberia
Khashaba 21' (pen.); Hanafy 24'; Sabry 46'; Kamouna 68'; Emam 77'	Report

Cairo International Stadium, Cairo
Attendance: 35,000
Referee: Kine Tibebu (Ethiopia)

17 August 1997
19:45

Tunisia	4–0	Namibia
Baya 19', 57'; Souayah 31'; Limam 70'	Report

Stade El Menzah, Tunis
Attendance: 15,000
Referee: Salah Ahmed Mohamed Salih (Sudan)

=== Group 3 ===
Team	Pld	W	D	L	GF	GA	GD	Pts
South Africa	6	4	1	1	7	3	4	13
Congo	6	3	1	2	5	5	0	10
Zambia	6	2	2	2	7	6	1	8
DR Congo	6	0	2	4	4	9	−5	2

In May 1997, Zaire were renamed the Democratic Republic of the Congo (Congo DR).

9 November 1996
15:00

South Africa	1–0	Zaire
Masinga 67'	Report

FNB Stadium, Johannesburg
Attendance: 55,000
Referee: Said Belqola (Morocco)

10 November 1996
16:30

Congo	1–0	Zambia
Niere 86'	Report

Stade Municipal, Pointe-Noire
Attendance: 40,000
Referee: Charles Masembe (Uganda)

11 January 1997
15:00

Zambia	0–0	South Africa
	Report

Independence Stadium, Lusaka
Attendance: 75,000
Referee: Tajaddin Fares (Syria)

12 January 1997
15:30

Zaire	1–1	Congo
Lembi 13'	Report	Bongo 4'

Stade Kamanyola, Kinshasa
Attendance: 60,000
Referee: Lucien Bouchardeau (Niger)

6 April 1997
15:30

Congo	2–0	South Africa
Younga-Mouhani 60', 64'	Report

Stade Municipal, Pointe-Noire
Attendance: 38,000
Referee: Sidi Magassa (Mali)

9 April 1997
15:00

Zaire	2–2	Zambia
N'tsunda 29'; Bazamba 51'	Report	Malitoli 22'; Tembo 81'

National Sports Stadium, Harare
Attendance: 20,000
Referee: Lim Kee Chong (Mauritius)

27 April 1997
15:30

Zaire	1–2	South Africa
Tumba 26'	Report	Khumalo 21'; Masinga 66'

Stade de Kégué, Lomé
Attendance: 7,000
Referee: Emmanuel Obafemi (Nigeria)

27 April 1997
15:00

Zambia	3–0	Congo
Lota 40'; Miti 85'; Bwalya 85'	Report

Independence Stadium, Lusaka
Attendance: 25,000
Referee: Sidi Magassa (Mali)

8 June 1997
15:30

Congo	1–0	DR Congo
Younga-Mouhani 60'	Report

Stade Municipal, Pointe-Noire
Attendance: 30,000
Referee: Mamadouba Camara (Guinea)

8 June 1997
15:00

South Africa	3–0	Zambia
Mkhalele 8'; Masinga 17'; Williams 54'	Report

FNB Stadium, Johannesburg
Attendance: 73,000
Referee: Gamal Al-Ghandour (Egypt)

16 August 1997
15:30

South Africa	1–0	Congo
Masinga 14'	Report

FNB Stadium, Johannesburg
Attendance: 80,000
Referee: Charles Masembe (Uganda)

16 August 1997
15:00

Zambia	2–0	DR Congo
Kamwandi 32', 56'	Report

Independence Stadium, Lusaka
Attendance: 12,000
Referee: Edwin Senai (Botswana)

=== Group 4 ===
Team	Pld	W	D	L	GF	GA	GD	Pts
Cameroon	6	4	2	0	10	4	6	14
Angola	6	2	4	0	7	4	3	10
Zimbabwe	6	1	1	4	6	7	−1	4
Togo	6	1	1	4	6	14	−8	4

10 November 1996
15:30

Angola	2–1	Zimbabwe
Akwá 43'; Paulão 51'	Report	Ndlovu 60'

Estádio da Cidadela, Luanda
Attendance: 60,000
Referee: Gamal Al-Ghandour (Egypt)

10 November 1996
16:00

Togo	2–4	Cameroon
Noutsoudje 50'; Salou 83' (pen.)	Report	Tchami 10', 24', 55'; Missé-Missé 63'

Stade de Kégué, Lomé
Attendance: 15,000
Referee: Lim Kee Chong (Mauritius)

12 January 1997
15:30

Cameroon	0–0	Angola
	Report

Ahmadou Ahidjo Stadium, Yaoundé
Attendance: 75,000
Referee: Said Belqola (Morocco)

12 January 1997
15:00

Zimbabwe	3–0	Togo
Chihuri 16'; Takawira 21' (pen.), 49'	Report

National Sports Stadium, Harare
Attendance: 45,000
Referee: Omer Yengo (Congo)

6 April 1997
15:00

Angola	3–1	Togo
Paulão 29'; Akwá 45'; Sousa 51'	Report	Oyawolé 21'

Estádio da Cidadela, Luanda
Attendance: 30,000
Referee: Emmanuel Okoampah (Ghana)

6 April 1997
15:30

Cameroon	1–0	Zimbabwe
Tchoutang 80'	Report

Ahmadou Ahidjo Stadium, Yaoundé
Attendance: 50,000
Referee: Jean-Fidèle Diramba (Gabon)

27 April 1997
15:30

Cameroon	2–0	Togo
Tchoutang 87'; Mboma 90'	Report

Ahmadou Ahidjo Stadium, Yaoundé
Attendance: 25,000
Referee: Lucian Bouchardeau (Niger)

27 April 1997
15:00

Zimbabwe	0–0	Angola
	Report

National Sports Stadium, Harare
Attendance: 47,257
Referee: Ian McLeod (South Africa)

8 June 1997
15:00

Angola	1–1	Cameroon
Akwá 55'	Report	Mboma 47'

Estádio da Cidadela, Luanda
Attendance: 60,000
Referee: Charles Masembe (Uganda)

8 June 1997
16:00

Togo	2–1	Zimbabwe
Salou 8', 21'	Report	Takawira 65' (pen.)

Stade de Kégué, Lomé
Attendance: 10,000
Referee: Zeli Sinko (Ivory Coast)

17 August 1997
14:00

Togo	1–1	Angola
Ouadja 47'	Report	Quinzinho 43'

Stade de Kégué, Lomé
Attendance: 4,500
Referee: Sidi Magassa (Mali)

17 August 1997
16:00

Zimbabwe	1–2	Cameroon
Dinha 82'	Report	Mboma 50', 54'

National Sports Stadium, Harare
Attendance: 12,736
Referee: Gamal Al-Ghandour (Egypt)

=== Group 5 ===
Gabon vs Sierra Leone was not played, since neither team could advance with a win.

Team	Pld	W	D	L	GF	GA	GD	Pts
Morocco	6	5	1	0	14	2	12	16
Sierra Leone	5	2	1	2	4	6	−2	7
Ghana	6	1	3	2	7	7	0	6
Gabon	5	0	1	4	1	11	−10	1

9 November 1996
18:00

Morocco	4–0	Sierra Leone
Hababi 16'; Raghib 50', 55'; Fertout 57'	Report

Prince Moulay Abdellah Stadium, Rabat
Attendance: 25,000
Referee: Olufemi Olaniyan (Nigeria)

10 November 1996
16:00

Gabon	1–1	Ghana
Nguema 65'	Report	Pele 66'

Stade Omar Bongo, Libreville
Attendance: 45,000
Referee: Ian McLeod (South Africa)

11 January 1997
16:30

Sierra Leone	1–0	Gabon
Kanu 46'	Report

National Stadium, Freetown
Attendance: 40,000
Referee: Olufemi Olaniyan (Nigeria)

12 January 1997
14:45

Ghana	2–2	Morocco
Johnson 77'; Moses 89'	Report	Bassir 30'; Hadji 70'

Baba Yara Stadium, Kumasi
Attendance: 45,000
Referee: Ali Mohamed Bujsaim (UAE)

5 April 1997
16:30

Sierra Leone	1–1	Ghana
Conteh 87'	Report	A. Kamara 23' (o.g.)

National Stadium, Freetown
Attendance: 30,000
Referee: Lucien Bouchardeau (Niger)

6 April 1997
16:00

Gabon	0–4	Morocco
	Report	Bahja 2', 5'; Bassir 44', 45'

Stade Omar Bongo, Libreville
Attendance: 40,000
Referee: Charles Masembe (Uganda)

Match abandoned after 53 minutes due to crowd trouble. FIFA allowed the result to stand

26 April 1997
16:30

Sierra Leone	0–1	Morocco
	Report	Bassir 40'

National Stadium, Freetown
Attendance: 45,000
Referee: Falla N'Doye (Senegal)

27 April 1997
15:00

Ghana	3–0	Gabon
Aboagye 42'; Gargo 60', 64' (pen.)	Report

Accra Sports Stadium, Accra
Attendance: 35,000
Referee: Ahmed Shinnawi (Egypt)

8 June 1997
20:00

Morocco	1–0	Ghana
Raghib 67'	Report

Stade Mohammed V, Casablanca
Attendance: 80,000
Referee: Sidi Magassa (Mali)

8 June 1997
16:00

Gabon	P–P	Sierra Leone
	Report

Stade Omar Bongo, Libreville
Referee: Lucien Bouchardeau (Niger)

Match postponed due to Sierra Leone not being able to travel from Freetown due to conflict. The match was never rearranged due to the result having no effect on final group standings

16 August 1997
20:00

Morocco	2–0	Gabon
Naybet 24'; Bahja (45(+2))	Report

Stade Mohammed V, Casablanca
Attendance: 125,000
Referee: Hussein Moussa (Egypt)

17 August 1997
15:00

Ghana	0–2	Sierra Leone
	Report	Amidu 14'; Kallon 47'

Accra Sports Stadium, Accra
Attendance: 3,000
Referee: Lazare Essimi Mbengue (Cameroon)

== Qualified teams ==
The following five teams from CAF qualified for the final tournament.

Team	Qualified as	Qualified on	Previous appearances in FIFA World Cup
Nigeria	Final Round Group 1 winners	7 June 1997	1 (1994)
Tunisia	Final Round Group 2 winners	8 June 1997	1 (1978)
South Africa	Final Round Group 3 winners	16 August 1997	0 (debut)
Cameroon	Final Round Group 4 winners	17 August 1997	3 (1982, 1990, 1994)
Morocco	Final Round Group 5 winners	8 June 1997	3 (1970, 1986, 1994)

== Goalscorers ==
There were 229 goals scored in 91 matches, for an average of 2.52 goals per match.

5 goals

- (Angola) Paulão
- (Burkina Faso) Mamadou Zongo
- (Kenya) Mike Okoth Origi
- (Zimbabwe) Vitalis Takawira

4 goals

- (Cameroon) Patrick Mboma
- (Egypt) Hossam Hassan
- (Guinea) Titi Camara
- (Guinea) Momo Soumah
- (Morocco) Salaheddine Bassir
- (Nigeria) Daniel Amokachi
- (South Africa) Phil Masinga
- (Tunisia) Adel Sellimi

3 goals

- (Angola) Akwá
- (Cameroon) Alphonse Tchami
- (Republic of the Congo) Macchambes Younga-Mouhani
- (Egypt) Ali Maher
- (Guinea) Fodé Camara
- (Morocco) Ahmed Bahja
- (Morocco) Khalid Raghib
- (Tunisia) Zoubeir Baya

2 goals

- (Angola) Paulo Jorge da Silva
- (Cameroon) Bernard Tchoutang
- (Republic of the Congo) Olivier Niere
- (Egypt) Hady Khashaba
- (Ghana) Mohammed Gargo
- (Ghana) Samuel Johnson
- (Guinea) Souleymane Oularé
- (Guinea-Bissau) Pereira Tavares
- (Kenya) Musa Otieno
- (Kenya) Kennedy Simiyu
- (Kenya) Maurice Sunguti
- (Liberia) James Debbah
- (Liberia) George Weah
- (Namibia) Mohammed Ouseb
- (Namibia) Eliphas Shivute
- (Namibia) Gervatius Uri Khob
- (Nigeria) Emmanuel Amunike
- (South Africa) Shaun Bartlett
- (Togo) Bachirou Salou
- (Togo) Kossi Noutsoudje
- (Togo) Djima Oyawolé
- (Tunisia) Khaled Badra
- (Zaire) Elos Elonga-Ekakia
- (Zaire) Michel Ngonge
- (Zaire) Jerry Tondelua
- (Zambia) Frazer Kamwandi
- (Zambia) Dennis Lota
- (Zambia) Andrew Tembo

1 goal

- (Algeria) Abdelhafid Tasfaout
- (Algeria) Sid Ahmed Zerrouki
- (Angola) Fernando Manuel Sousa
- (Angola) Joaquim Alberto Silva
- (Burkina Faso) Kassoum Ouédraogo
- (Burkina Faso) Firmin Sanou
- (Burkina Faso) Ousmane Sanou
- (Burkina Faso) Brahima Traore
- (Burundi) Jean-Marie Mbuyi
- (Burundi) Sutche Wambo
- (Cameroon) Jean-Jacques Missé-Missé
- (Republic of the Congo) Christ Bongo
- (Republic of the Congo) Charles Imboula
- (Republic of the Congo) Sousa Miyamou
- (Ivory Coast) Lassina Dao
- (Egypt) Hazem Emam
- (Egypt) Hesham Hanafy
- (Egypt) Ahmed Hassan
- (Egypt) Ibrahim Hassan
- (Egypt) Samir Kamouna
- (Egypt) Abdel Sattar Sabry
- (Gabon) Brice Mackaya
- (Gabon) Anicet Yala Ngoukou
- (Gabon) Théodore Nzue Nguema
- (Gabon) Jonas Ogandaga
- (The Gambia) Abdul Aziz Corr
- (The Gambia) Ebrima Ebou Sillah
- (Ghana) Felix Aboagye
- (Ghana) Augustine Ahinful
- (Ghana) Arthur Moses
- (Ghana) Abedi Pele
- (Guinea) Tibou Bangoura
- (Guinea-Bissau) Cipriano Có
- (Guinea-Bissau) Nando Có
- (Kenya) Vincent Kwarula
- (Kenya) Henry Motego
- (Kenya) Francis Were
- (Liberia) Robert Clarke
- (Liberia) Prince Daye
- (Liberia) Oliver Makor
- (Madagascar) Jiana Raoelijaona
- (Madagascar) Etienne Hajason Rasoanaivo
- (Madagascar) Etienne Rado Rasoanaivo
- (Mauritius) Antoine Mocude
- (Morocco) Youssef Fertout
- (Morocco) El Arbi Hababi
- (Morocco) Mustapha Hadji
- (Morocco) Noureddine Naybet
- (Mozambique) Armando Macamo
- (Namibia) Ewald Hoeseb
- (Namibia) Johannes Ortmann
- (Namibia) Simon Uutoni
- (Nigeria) Mutiu Adepoju
- (Nigeria) Jonathan Akpoborie
- (Nigeria) Sunday Oliseh
- (Nigeria) Wilson Oruma
- (Rwanda) Leon Mupenzi
- (Senegal) Mamadou Diallo
- (Senegal) Omar Traoré
- (Sierra Leone) Jamiru Amidu
- (Sierra Leone) Lamin Conteh
- (Sierra Leone) Mohamed Kallon
- (Sierra Leone) Abu Kanu
- (South Africa) Mark Fish
- (South Africa) Doctor Khumalo
- (South Africa) Helman Mkhalele
- (South Africa) Eric Tinkler
- (South Africa) Mark Williams
- (Sudan) Khalid Ahmed Elmustafa
- (Sudan) Anas Elnour
- (Tanzania) Mohamed Daima
- (Togo) Kokouni Akpalo Gnavor
- (Togo) Lantame Ouadja
- (Togo) Tadjou Salou
- (Tunisia) Mehdi Ben Slimane
- (Tunisia) Hédi Berkhissa
- (Tunisia) Taoufik Herichi
- (Tunisia) Riadh Jelassi
- (Tunisia) Jameleddine Limam
- (Tunisia) Skander Souayah
- (Uganda) Robert Kizito
- (Zaire) Epotele Bazamba
- (Zaire) Emeka Mamale
- (Zaire) Nzelo Hervé Lembi
- (Zaire) Étienne N'tsunda
- (Zaire) Zico Tumba
- (Zambia) Johnson Bwalya
- (Zambia) Kenneth Malitoli
- (Zambia) Mwape Miti
- (Zambia) Vincent Mutale
- (Zimbabwe) Kennedy Chihuri
- (Zimbabwe) Edelbert Dinha
- (Zimbabwe) Adam Ndlovu
- (Zimbabwe) Agent Sawu
- (Zimbabwe) Cloudious Zviripayi

1 own goal

- (Burkina Faso) Mohamadi Balma (playing against Guinea)
- (Sierra Leone) Abubakar Kamara (playing against Ghana)
