= Ebony Shoe =

Association football award in Belgium

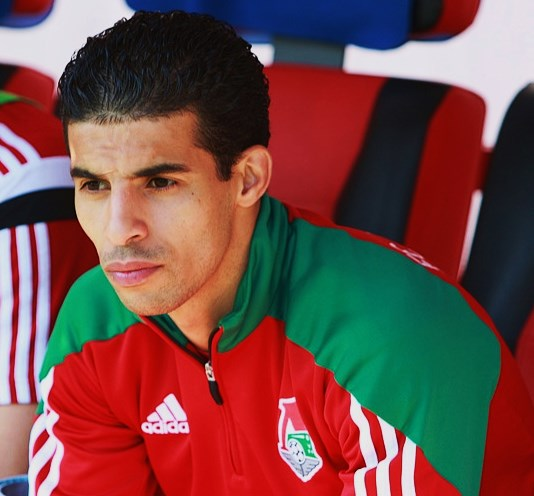
Moroccan Mbark Boussoufa won the Ebony Shoe a record three times

The Ebony Shoe award (Dutch: Ebbenhouten schoen, French: Soulier d'ébène) is a football award in Belgium given annually to the best African or African origin player in the Belgian Pro League. The jury is composed of the coaches of league clubs, the Belgium national team manager, sport journalists, and one or more honorary jurors.

As of 2026, Mbark Boussoufa (3 wins), Daniel Amokachi (2 wins), Vincent Kompany (2 wins) and Dieumerci Mbokani (2) are the only players to have won the trophy more than once.

== History ==
The Ebony Shoe was created in 1992 by Cerina de Rosen, Fely Samuna, Bernard Malaba Tshienda, Eugene Bunga and Moro Mukota in association with the African Culture Promotion. The reasoning for it was because it was felt by a number of African students in Belgium that football players of African origin were being overlooked for individual awards. It was based upon the Golden Shoe award that already existed. Eligibility was determined as a player being born in Africa or being of African descent for those born outside of Africa. It also led to the inspiration of the creation of Le Lion Belge (Belgian Lion Award) by for the best player of Magrebian origin, also using a panel of journalists and honorary jurors to determine the winner. For a number of players, it is the first individual award they have received in their careers.

Selection for the award is made by a panel of club managers from Belgium's top three divisions, the Belgium national football team manager as well as journalists, judges and honorary jurors. The award is made in two parts. Three quarters of the way through a season, a vote is held to determine the five player shortlist with a second vote being held after the season has finished to decide which of the shortlisted players had won the Ebony Shoe.

In 2021, Paul Onuachu won the Ebony Shoe, becoming the first Nigerian to win it in 25 years while also winning the Belgian Professional Footballer of the Year and being the top scorer in Belgium. In 2023, La Tribune discussed which winner had the most impact, with Vincent Kompany and Mbark Boussoufa being named as the two that had.

== Winners ==
Year	Winner		Second		Third	
Year	Player	Club	Player	Club	Player	Club
1992	Daniel Amokachi (NGA)	Club Brugge	only the winner declared			
1993	Victor Ikpeba (NGA)	RFC Liège	Chidi Nwanu (NGA)	Beveren	Daniel Amokachi (NGA)	Club Brugge
1994	Daniel Amokachi (NGA)	Club Brugge	Jean-Jacques Missé-Missé (CMR)	Charleroi	Roger Lukaku (ZAI)	Seraing
1995	Godwin Okpara (NGA)	Eendracht Aalst	Celestine Babayaro (NGA)	Anderlecht	Yaw Preko (GHA)	Anderlecht
1996	Celestine Babayaro (NGA)	Anderlecht	Michel Ngonge (ZAI)	Harelbeke	Jean-Claude Mukanya (ZAI)	Lommel
1997	Émile Mpenza (BEL) ( (Democratic Republic of the Congo) )	Mouscron	Mbo Mpenza (BEL) ( (Democratic Republic of the Congo) )	Mouscron	Khalilou Fadiga (SEN)	Lommel
1998	Eric Addo (GHA)	Club Brugge	Souleymane Oularé (GUI)	Genk	Khalilou Fadiga (SEN)	Club Brugge
1999	Souleymane Oularé (GUI)	Genk	only the winner ranked; the rest of the top 5 unordered (Fadiga, Keita, É. Mpenza and M. Mpenza)			
2000	Hervé Nzelo-Lembi (COD)	Club Brugge	Elos Elonga-Ekakia (COD)	Anderlecht	Souleymane Youla (GUI)	Lokeren
2001	Mido (EGY)	Gent	Hervé Nzelo-Lembi (COD)	Club Brugge	Adékambi Olufadé (TOG)	Lokeren
2002	Moumouni Dagano (BFA)	Genk	Sambégou Bangoura (GUI)	Lokeren	Ibrahim Kargbo (SLE)	RWDM
2003	Aruna Dindane (CIV)	Anderlecht	Sambégou Bangoura (GUI)	Lokeren	Paul Kpaka (SLE)	Germinal Beerschot
2004	Vincent Kompany (BEL) ( (Democratic Republic of the Congo) )	Anderlecht	Aruna Dindane (CIV)	Anderlecht	Mbo Mpenza (BEL) ( (Democratic Republic of the Congo) )	Mouscron
2005	Vincent Kompany (BEL) ( (Democratic Republic of the Congo) )	Anderlecht	Sambégou Bangoura (GUI)	Standard Liège	Aruna Dindane (CIV)	Anderlecht
2006	Mbark Boussoufa (MAR)	Gent	Ibrahim Salou (GHA)	Zulte Waregem	Mohammed Tchité (BDI)	Standard Liège
2007	Mohammed Tchité (BDI)	Anderlecht	Ahmed Hassan (EGY)	Anderlecht	Adékambi Olufadé (TOG)	Gent
2008	Marouane Fellaini (BEL) ( (Morocco) )	Standard Liège	Mbark Boussoufa (MAR)	Anderlecht	Mohamed Sarr (SEN)	Standard Liège
2009	Mbark Boussoufa (MAR)	Anderlecht	Copa (CIV)	Lokeren	Nana Asare (GHA)	Mechelen
2010	Mbark Boussoufa (MAR)	Anderlecht	Romelu Lukaku (BEL) ( (Democratic Republic of the Congo) )	Anderlecht	Dorge Kouemaha (CMR)	Club Brugge
2011	Romelu Lukaku (BEL) ( (Democratic Republic of the Congo) )	Anderlecht	Mohammed Tchité (BDI)	Standard Liège	Mehdi Carcela (MAR)	Standard Liège
2012	Dieumerci Mbokani (COD)	Anderlecht	Cheikhou Kouyaté (SEN)	Anderlecht	Mohammed Tchité (BDI)	Standard Liège
2013	Mbaye Leye (SEN)	Zulte Waregem	Cheikhou Kouyaté (SEN)	Anderlecht	Dieumerci Mbokani (COD)	Anderlecht
2014	Michy Batshuayi (BEL) ( (Democratic Republic of the Congo) )	Standard Liège	Hamdi Harbaoui (TUN)	Lokeren	Paul-Jose M'Poku (BEL) ( (Democratic Republic of the Congo) )	Standard Liège
2015	Neeskens Kebano (COD)	Charleroi	Moses Simon (NGA)	Gent	Chancel Mbemba (COD)	Anderlecht
2016	Sofiane Hanni (ALG)	Mechelen	Nana Asare (GHA)	Gent	Frank Acheampong (GHA)	Anderlecht
2017	Youri Tielemans (BEL) ( (Democratic Republic of the Congo) )	Anderlecht	Landry Dimata (BEL) ( (Democratic Republic of the Congo) )	Oostende	Sofiane Hanni (ALG)	Anderlecht
2018	Anthony Limbombe (BEL) ( (Democratic Republic of the Congo) )	Club Brugge	Mehdi Carcela (MAR)	Standard Liège	Ibrahima Seck (SEN)	Genk
2019	Mbwana Samatta (TAN)	Genk	only the winner ranked; the rest of the top 5 unordered (Boli, Carcela, Dimata and Danjuma)			
2020	Dieumerci Mbokani (DRC)	Antwerp	Clinton Mata (ANG)	Club Brugge	Simon Deli (CIV)	Club Brugge
2021	Paul Onuachu (NGA)	Genk	Clinton Mata (ANG)	Club Brugge	Théo Bongonda (BEL) ( (Democratic Republic of the Congo) )	Genk
2022	Tarik Tissoudali (MAR)	Gent	Paul Onuachu (NGA)	Genk	Joshua Zirkzee (NED) ( (Nigeria) )	Anderlecht
2023	Mike Trésor (BEL) ( (Burundi) )	Genk	Victor Boniface (NGA)	Union SG	Gift Orban (NGA)	Gent
2024	Kévin Denkey (TOG)	Cercle Brugge	Mohamed Amoura (ALG)	Union SG	Bilal El Khannous (MAR)	Genk
2025	Tolu Arokodare (NGA)	Genk	Noah Sadiki (DRC)	Union SG	Zakaria El Ouahdi (MAR)	Genk
2026	Zakaria El Ouahdi (MAR)	Genk	Adem Zorgane (ALG)	Union SG	Raphael Onyedika (NGA)	Club Brugge

== Breakdown of winners ==
=== By country of origin ===
Country	Number of wins	Winning years
Democratic Republic of the Congo	11	1997, 2000, 2004, 2005, 2011, 2012, 2014, 2015, 2017, 2018, 2020
Nigeria	7	1992, 1993, 1994, 1995, 1996, 2021, 2025
Morocco	6	2006, 2008, 2009, 2010, 2022, 2026
Burundi	2	2007, 2023
Ghana	1	1998
Guinea	1	1999
Egypt	1	2001
Burkina Faso	1	2002
Ivory Coast	1	2003
Senegal	1	2013
Algeria	1	2016
Tanzania	1	2019
Togo	1	2024

=== By club ===
Club	Number of wins	Winning years
Anderlecht	10	1996, 2003, 2004, 2005, 2007, 2009, 2010, 2011, 2012, 2017
Genk	7	1999, 2002, 2019, 2021, 2023, 2025, 2026
Club Brugge	5	1992, 1994, 1998, 2000, 2018
Gent	3	2001, 2006, 2022
Standard Liège	2	2008, 2014
RFC Liège	1	1993
Eendracht Aalst	1	1995
Mouscron	1	1997
Zulte Waregem	1	2013
Charleroi	1	2015
Mechelen	1	2016
Antwerp	1	2020
Cercle Brugge	1	2024
