= Mamadou Zongo =

Burkinabe footballer (born 1980)

- Zongo with Universitatea Cluj in 2007

Personal information
- Date of birth: 8 October 1980 (age 46)
- Place of birth: Bobo-Dioulasso, Upper Volta
- Height: 1.76 m (5 ft 9 in)
- Position: Striker

Team information
- Current team: ASFB (head coach)

Senior career*
Years	Team	Apps	(Gls)
1996	RC Bobo	25	(22)
1997	ASEC Mimosas	22	(18)
1997–2004	Vitesse	77	(14)
2004–2006	De Graafschap	24	(2)
2006	VVV-Venlo	0	(0)
2006–2007	Ethnikos	11	(1)
2007	Universitatea Cluj	2	(0)
2010–2012	ASFA Yennenga		
Total		161	(57)

International career
1996–2005	Burkina Faso	24	(14)

Managerial career
- 2013–2014: Santos FC Ouagadougou
- 2015–: ASFB
- * Club domestic league appearances and goals

Mamadou "Bebeto" Zongo (born 8 October 1980) is a Burkinabé football coach and former player who played as a striker.

== Club career ==
=== Early career ===
Zongo was born in Bobo-Dioulasso, Upper Volta (today Burkina Faso). He began playing football in 1996 at RC Bobo, winning the Burkinabé Premier League championship at the end of his first season, netting a personal record of 22 goals in 25 matches. In the next season he went to play for ASEC Mimosas for which he scored 18 goals in 22 Côte d'Ivoire Premier Division games, as the team won The Double.

=== Career in Netherlands ===
Afterwards, Zongo went to play for Dutch side Vitesse, making his Eredivisie debut on 31 October 1998 when coach Herbert Neumann sent him in the 62nd to replace Marko Perović in a 2–1 away loss to Heerenveen. On 3 December, he netted his first goals when he managed a double in a 5–3 away win over Willem II, and in the following round he scored another brace in a 2–0 victory against NAC Breda. In the same season he made his debut in European competitions, helping his side get past AEK Athens in the first round of the 1998–99 UEFA Cup, being eliminated in the second round by Bordeaux. In the next season he netted a brace in a 2–1 win over RKC Waalwijk in the league and helped his side once again get past the first round of the UEFA Cup by eliminating Beira-Mar, but they were defeated in the following round by Lens. In the second round of the 2000–01 UEFA Cup, Zongo made his last two made his last two of his seven total appearances in the competition, as he played in both legs of the loss to Inter Milan on the away goal rule after 1–1 on aggregate. From 2001 to 2003 he missed two seasons, being unable to play due to a ligament injury on his right knee, which required five operations.

In 2004, Zongo went to play for De Graafschap, making his league debut under coach Gert Kruys on 22 August in a 1–1 draw against Den Bosch. In the following round he opened the score in a 2–1 loss to Roda JC. On 22 May 2005, he made his last Eredivisie appearance, playing in a 2–1 home loss to his former team, Vitesse, having a total of 101 matches with 16 goals scored in the competition. De Graafschap was relegated at the end of the season. Zongo stayed with the club for one more season in which he made no appearances. In 2005 he moved to VVV-Venlo, also in the second league, but again did not play.

=== Late career ===
In 2006, Zongo joined Ethnikos in the Greek second league. Subsequently, he signed on a free transfer for Romanian club, Universitatea Cluj in November 2007 and had a salary of $9,000 per month. He made his Liga I debut on 24 November, being used by coach Gheorghe Mulțescu as a starter in a 1–1 draw against Politehnica Iași. After only two matches, he was released by the club board in December 2007, because of his recurring knee injury. In October 2010, he signed a contract for ASFA Yennega of Burkina Faso and spent the last two years of his playing career with the club.

== International career ==
Zongo played 24 games in which he scored 14 goals for Burkina Faso, making his debut on 9 November 1996 under coach Ivan Vutov in a 2–0 away loss to Nigeria in the 1998 World Cup qualifiers. His following four games were also during the World Cup qualifiers, Zongo scoring in all of them, starting with a brace against Kenya and one goal against each of Guinea, Nigeria and Kenya again, but all the matches resulted in losses. Afterwards he played in three games during the successful 2000 African Cup of Nations qualifiers, scoring two goals in two wins over Burundi. Then coach René Taelman used him in all three group stage matches in the final tournament which were losses to Senegal and Egypt, but also a draw against Zambia. In the following years, Zongo made two appearances in which he netted three goals in the 2002 World Cup qualifiers and played four games and scored once in a 1–0 win over Angola during the 2002 African Cup of Nations qualifiers. His last four games for The Stallions were in the 2006 World Cup qualifiers, netting one goal in a 1–0 victory against Ghana, with his last match being a 2–1 home loss to Cape Verde, played on 26 March 2005.

== Coaching career ==
In April 2013, Zongo became head coach of the Burkinabé side Santos.

He was appointed head coach of ASFB in 2015.

== Career statistics ==
=== International ===
Scores and results list Burkina Faso's goal tally first, score column indicates score after each Zongo goal.

List of international goals scored by Mamadou Zongo
No.	Date	Venue	Opponent	Score	Result	Competition	Ref.
1	6 April 1997	Moi International Sports Centre, Kasarani, Kenya	Kenya	1–0	3–4	1998 FIFA World Cup qualification	
2	6 April 1997	Moi International Sports Centre, Kasarani, Kenya	Kenya	3–1	3–4	1998 FIFA World Cup qualification	
3	27 April 1997	Stade du 4 Août, Ouagadougou, Burkina Faso	Nigeria	1–2	1–2	1998 FIFA World Cup qualification	
4	8 June 1997	Stade du 28 Septembre, Conakry, Guinea	Guinea	1–0	1–3	1998 FIFA World Cup qualification	
5	16 August 1997	Stade Wobi, Bobo-Dioulasso, Burkina Faso	Kenya	1–1	2–4	1998 FIFA World Cup qualification	
6	28 February 1999	Intwari Stadium, Bujumbura, Burundi	Burundi	1–1	2–1	2000 African Cup of Nations qualification	
7	11 April 1999	Stade du 4 Août, Ouagadougou, Burkina Faso	Burundi	2–0	3–1	2000 African Cup of Nations qualification	
8	23 April 2000	Stade du 4 Août, Ouagadougou, Burkina Faso	Ethiopia	1–0	3–0	2002 FIFA World Cup qualification	
9	23 April 2000	Stade du 4 Août, Ouagadougou, Burkina Faso	Ethiopia	3–0	3–0	2002 FIFA World Cup qualification	
10	14 June 2000	Nairobi City Stadium, Nairobi, Kenya	Kenya	1–0	1–0	Friendly	
11	17 June 2000	Kamuzu Stadium, Blantyre, Malawi	Malawi	1–0	1–1	2002 FIFA World Cup qualification	
12	13 January 2001	Stade du 4 Août, Ouagadougou, Burkina Faso	Angola	1–0	1–0	2002 African Cup of Nations qualification	
13	5 June 2004	Stade du 4 Août, Ouagadougou, Burkina Faso	Ghana	1–0	1–0	2006 FIFA World Cup qualification	
14	17 August 2004	Stade du 5 Juillet, Algiers, Algeria	Algeria	1–1	2–2	Friendly	

== Honours ==
RC Bobo

- Burkinabé Premier League: 1996

ASEC Mimosas

- Côte d'Ivoire Premier Division: 1997
- Côte d'Ivoire Cup: 1997
