= Lukaku =

Lukaku is a surname. Notable people with the surname include:

- Roger Lukaku (1967–2025), Belgian and Congolese former footballer.
- Romelu Lukaku (born 1993), Belgian footballer and son of Roger Lukaku
- Jordan Lukaku (born 1994), Belgian footballer and son of Roger Lukaku
