= Taelman =

Taelman is a surname. Notable people with the name include:

- Martine Taelman (born 1965), Belgian politician
- Oscar Taelman (1877–1945), Belgian rower
- René Taelman (1945–2019), Belgian football manager
