= Riadh Jelassi =

Tunisian footballer

Personal information
- Full name: Riadh Jelassi
- Date of birth: 7 July 1971 (age 55)
- Place of birth: Tebourba, Tunisia
- Height: 1.77 m (5 ft 10 in)
- Position: Striker

Senior career*
Years	Team	Apps	(Gls)
1995–2000	Étoile Sportive du Sahel		
2001	Al-Shabab		
2001–2004	Espérance Tunis		

International career
1996–2002	Tunisia	20	(5)
- * Club domestic league appearances and goals

Riadh Jelassi (Arabic: رياض جلاسي) (born 7 July 1971 in Tebourba) is a Tunisian former professional footballer who played as a striker.

He was a member of the Tunisian national team at the World Cups in 1998 and 2002, although he only appeared as a substitute in Tunisia's last 1998 World Cup match against Romania, already eliminated. He scored 5 goals in 20 appearances for Tunisia.

== International goals ==
#	Date	Venue	Opponent	Score	Result	Competition
1	10 November 1996	Accra Sports Stadium, Accra, Ghana	Liberia	1–0	1–0	1998 FIFA World Cup qualification
2	13 July 1997	Stade El Menzah, Tunis	Guinea	1–0	1–0	1998 African Cup of Nations qualification
3	9 August 1997	Stade El Menzah, Tunis	Nigeria	2–0	2–0	1997 LG Cup final
4	2 June 2001	Stade Omar Bongo, Libreville	Gabon	1–1	1–1	2002 African Cup of Nations qualification
5	1 July 2001	Stade El Menzah, Tunis	Congo	6–0	6–0	2002 FIFA World Cup qualification
