= Firmin Sanou =

Burkinabé footballer

Personal information
- Date of birth: 21 April 1973
- Place of birth: Bobo-Dioulasso, Upper Volta
- Height: 1.78 m (5 ft 10 in)
- Position: Defender

Senior career*
Years	Team	Apps	(Gls)
1991–1994	RC Bobo Dioulasso		
1995–2000	EF Ouagadougou		
2000–2004	ASOA Valence	82	(2)
2004–2005	UMS Montélimar		
2005–2006	AS Valence		
2006–2009	SO Chambéry		

International career
1994–2003	Burkina Faso	42	(2)
- * Club domestic league appearances and goals

Firmin Sanou (born 21 April 1973) is a Burkinabé former professional footballer who played as a defender.

He was part of the Burkinabé 1998 African Nations Cup team, who finished fourth after losing to Congo DR on penalties in the bronze final. He was later part of the 2002 African Nations Cup team, who finished bottom of group B in the first round of competition, thus failing to secure qualification for the quarter-finals.

== Career statistics ==
=== International goals ===
Scores and results list Burkina Faso's goal tally first, score column indicates score after each Sanou goal.

List of international goals scored by Firmin Sanou
No.	Date	Venue	Opponent	Score	Result	Competition
1	29 March 1997	Sheikh Amri Abeid Memorial Stadium, Arusha, Tanzania	Tanzania	?–?	2–3	Friendly
2	6 April 1997	Moi International Sports Centre, Nairobi, Kenya	Kenya	2–0	3–4	1998 FIFA World Cup qualification
