= CS Avion =

Association football club in France

- Full name: Club Sportif Avionnais
- Founded: 1922; 104 years ago
- Ground: Stade François-Blin; Avion, Pas-de-Calais
- Capacity: 4,800
- Chairman: (France) Jean-Luc Dezellus
- Manager: (Algeria) Chérif Oudjani
- League: Championnat de France Amateurs 2 (Group B)
- 2007–08: Division d'Honneur de Nord-Pas-de-Calais; Promoted
Home colours

Club Sportif Avionnais or simply CS Avion is a French professional football club founded in 1922. They are based in Avion, Pas-de-Calais and are currently competing in the Championnat de France Amateurs 2 Group B, the fifth tier in the French football league system. They play at the Stade François-Blin, which has a capacity of 4,800 spectators. They are a regular participant in the Coupe de France, often appearing in the stages where the professional clubs enter.

== History ==
Club Sportif Avionnais was founded in 1922. The club's great success came early in their existence. During the 1950s, as an amateur club, they reached the Coupe de France Round of 64 and Round of 32 on several occasions. In league play, the club has only made it as far as the Championnat de France Amateurs, their last appearance being during the 2004–05 season, in which they were relegated after four consecutive seasons there. Following their quick relegation from CFA 2, they were relocated to the Division d'Honneur de Nord-Pas-de-Calais. After two seasons there, they achieved promotion back to CFA 2 for the 2008–09 season.

They had a remarkable run during the 2007–08 Coupe de France, where they made it all the way to the Round of 64 before being eliminated by Ligue 1 club and lesser rivals Lille OSC. The club also operates a successful youth team, which is usually composed of young players that have been rejected or released from bigger Nord-Pas-de-Calais clubs, such as RC Lens and Lille. They appear often in the Coupe Gambardella reaching as far as the quarterfinals during the 2005–06 season.

== Current squad ==
As of Tue Mar 02, 2011

Note: Flags indicate national team as defined under FIFA eligibility rules; some limited exceptions apply. Players may hold more than one non-FIFA nationality.

No.	Pos.	Nation	Player
—	GK	FRA	Grégory Crombez
—	GK	FRA	Romain Lorandi
—	GK	FRA	Mallory Bochu
—	GK	FRA	Jérôme Lambenne
—	DF	MAD	Pascal Razakanantenaina
—	DF	MAD	Lalaina Nomenjanahary
—	DF	FRA	Maxime Deleau
—	DF	FRA	Romain Dubreucq
—	DF	FRA	Jérôme Eickmayer
—	DF	SEN	Laurent Mendy
—	DF	FRA	Johan Dumesic
—	DF	FRA	Alexis Blicq
—	MF	FRA	Mathieu Moulin
—	MF	MAD	Dimitri Carlos Zozimar
—	MF	FRA	Jordan Strappe

No.	Pos.	Nation	Player
—	MF	FRA	Thomas Bodart
—	MF	BRA	Alessandro Furtado
—	MF	FRA	Aymen Djedidi
—	MF	FRA	Franck Roszak
—	MF	CIV	Hermann Kouadio
—	MF	CIV	Saïb Ouattara
—	MF	CIV	Ali Keita
—	MF	FRA	Hamza Trasim
—	MF	FRA	Bruno Custos
—	FW	CPV	Emelson Brito Do Rosario
—	FW	FRA	Pierrick Capelle
—	FW	COD	Alain Massamba
—	FW	FRA	Sofiane Hadjal
—	FW	FRA	Nahim Malim

== Former players ==
- (Democratic Republic of the Congo) Zico Tumba

== Honours ==
- Coupe d'Artois: 1995, 1994, 1991
- Division d'Honneur de Nord-Pas-de-Calais: 2000, 1958
- Regional League de Nord-Pas-de-Calais: 1986, 1982
- Promotion League de Nord-Pas-de-Calais: 1993
