= Fernando Sousa =

Angolan retired footballer (born 1967)

Personal information
- Full name: Fernando Manuel Gomes Sousa
- Date of birth: 4 August 1967 (age 59)
- Place of birth: Luanda, Angola
- Height: 1.73 m (5 ft 8 in)
- Position: Midfielder

Youth career
- 1980–1981: Vitória Lisboa
- 1981–1982: Oriental
- 1982–1986: Sporting CP

Senior career*
Years	Team	Apps	(Gls)
1986–1987	Alverca		
1987–1989	Vialonga		
1989–2000	Campomaiorense	227	(14)
2001–2002	O Elvas		
2002–2004	Benavilense		

International career
1997–1998	Angola	13	(1)
- * Club domestic league appearances and goals

Fernando Manuel Gomes de Sousa (born 4 August 1967) is an Angolan former professional footballer who played as a midfielder.

== Club career ==
Born in Luanda, Sousa played his entire career in Portugal. His spell as a professional consisted of 11 1/2 seasons with S.C. Campomaiorense which he represented in all four major levels, with Primeira Liga totals of 73 games and two goals.

Sousa part of the side who reached the final of the Portuguese Cup, being an unused substitute in the 1–0 loss to S.C. Beira-Mar. He retired in 2004, at the age of 36.

== International career ==
Sousa played 13 times for the Angola national team, scoring his only goal on 6 April 1997 against Togo, in a 1998 FIFA World Cup qualification match.

== Career statistics ==
#	Date	Venue	Opponent	Result	Competition
1	6 April 1997	Estádio da Cidadela, Luanda, Angola	Togo	3–1	1998 World Cup qualification
