= Jerry Tondelua =

Congolese former footballer (born 1975)

Personal information
- Full name: Jerry Tondelua Mbuilua
- Date of birth: 27 February 1975 (age 51)
- Place of birth: Kinshasa, Zaire
- Position: Striker

Senior career*
Years	Team	Apps	(Gls)
1994–1997	Sodigraf		
1997–1999	Cercle Brugge	28	(9)
1999–2000	Oostende	20	(3)
2000–2001	Al Wahda		
Total		48+	(12+)

International career^{‡}
1996–2001	DR Congo (Note: DR Congo was known as Zaire until 1997.)	13	(8)
Medal record
Representing DR Congo
Men's football
Africa Cup of Nations
Third place	1998 Burkina Faso
- * Club domestic league appearances and goals as of 21:20, 4 April 2021 (UTC) ‡ National team caps and goals as of 21:20, 4 April 2021 (UTC)

Jerry Tondelua Mbuilua (born 27 February 1975) is a Congolese former footballer who played as a striker. He played club football for Sodigraf, Cercle Brugge, Oostende and Al Wahda and international football for the DR Congo national football team, representing his country at the 1998 African Cup of Nations.

== Career statistics ==
=== International ===
Scores and results list DR Congo's goal tally first, score column indicates score after each Tondelua goal.

List of international goals scored by Jerry Tondelua
No.	Date	Venue	Opponent	Score	Result	Competition
1	28 April 1996	Kamanyola Stadium, Kinshasa, Zaire	Congo	1–0	3–1	Friendly
2	28 April 1996	Kamanyola Stadium, Kinshasa, Zaire	Congo	2–0	3–1	Friendly
3	2 June 1996	Anjalay Stadium, Belle Vue Harel, Mauritius	Mauritius	3–0	5–1	1998 FIFA World Cup qualification
4	16 June 1996	Kamanloya Stadium, Kinshasa, Zaire	Mauritius	2–0	2–0	1998 FIFA World Cup qualification
5	9 February 1998	Stade Municipal, Ouagadougou, Burkina Faso	Togo	1–0	2–0	1998 Africa Cup of Nations
6	9 February 1998	Stade Municipal, Ouagadougou, Burkina Faso	Togo	2–0	2–0	1998 Africa Cup of Nations
7	20 February 1998	Stade Omnisports de Bobo-Dioulasso, Bobo-Dioulasso, Burkina Faso	Cameroon	1–0	1–0	1998 Africa Cup of Nations
8	27 February 1998	Stade Municipal, Ouagadougou, Burkina Faso	Burkina Faso	3–4	4–4 (4–1 p)	1998 African Cup of Nations

== Honours ==
DR Congo

- African Cup of Nations: 3rd place, 1998
