= Origi =

Origi is the surname of three related footballers:

- Mike Origi (born 1967), played for Kenya and various Belgian clubs
- Arnold Origi (born 1983), plays for Kenya and Lillestrøm, has played for various Kenyan and Norwegian clubs
- Divock Origi (born 1995), plays for Belgium and AC Milan
