= Macchambes Younga-Mouhani =

Congolese footballer (born 1974)

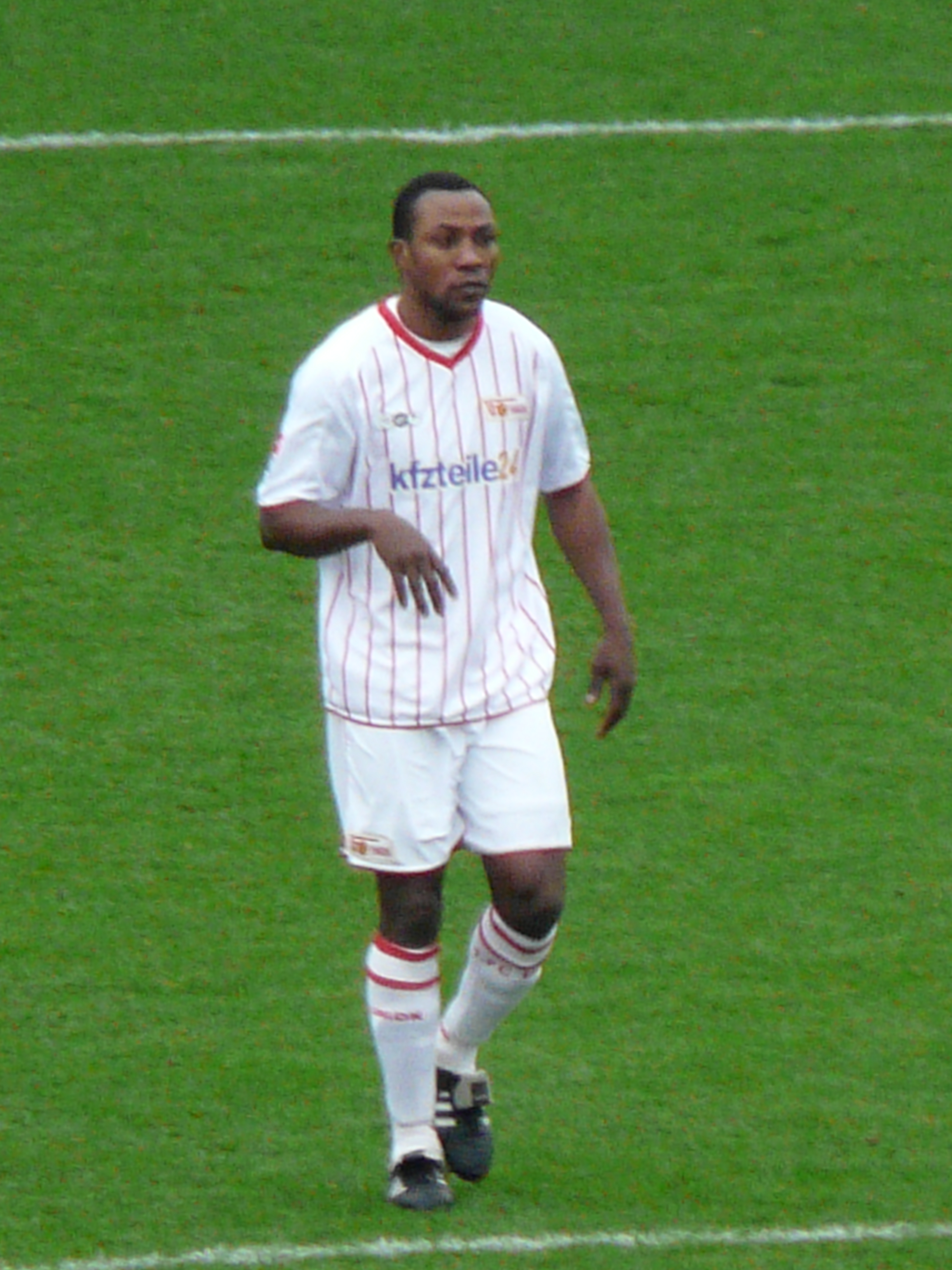
- Macchambes Younga-Mouhani in 2009

Personal information
- Date of birth: 1 August 1974 (age 52)
- Place of birth: Loubomo, People's Republic of the Congo
- Height: 1.79 m (5 ft 10 in)
- Position: Defensive midfielder

Senior career*
Years	Team	Apps	(Gls)
1992–1993	Diables Noirs		
1994–1995	Schwarz-Weiß Düren		
1995–1996	Borussia Mönchengladbach	2	(0)
1996–1997	Fortuna Düsseldorf	29	(3)
1996–2000	Fortuna Köln	71	(19)
2000–2005	Wacker Burghausen	129	(28)
2005–2007	Rot-Weiss Essen	51	(14)
2007–2011	Union Berlin	104	(8)
2011–2012	FC Wegberg-Beeck	16	(5)

International career
1992–2000	Republic of the Congo	17	(4)
- * Club domestic league appearances and goals

Macchambes "Mac" Younga-Mouhani (born 1 August 1974) is a Congolese former professional footballer who played as a defensive midfielder.

== Playing career ==
=== Early career ===
Younga in the former People's Republic of the Congo, where he started playing football in the streets. He later became a player for Diables Noirs and made his debut as a Congolese international against Chad at the age of 17. His national coach at the time, the German Armin Fickert, was also the one who put him in contact with clubs in Europe and thus enabled him to move to German club Schwarz-Weiß Düren. The Younga family still lives in Düren today.

Younga's career in German professional football began in the 1995–96 Bundesliga season with Borussia Mönchengladbach. He made two appearances there and then moved to Fortuna Düsseldorf, where he was relegated from the Bundesliga after the first season and afterwards joined Fortuna Köln in the following season. In Cologne that he became a regular starter.

=== Wacker and Rot-Weiss Essen ===
In early–2001, Younga joined Wacker Burghausen and stayed with the club for four years. During this time, he became a regular for the club and became renowned for his energy on the pitch. With Wacker, he promoted from the Regionalliga Süd to the 2. Bundesliga. He then moved to Rot-Weiss Essen for two years, who also won promotion to the 2. Bundesliga, but failed to stay up in the next year and thus suffered relegation again. Nevertheless, he impressed with Essen, and he became more broadly known when TV presenter Stefan Raab invited him to his show. The reason for this was a spectacular goal in the 2005–06 season against Chemnitzer FC, when Younga waited behind the goalkeeper for him to perform a goal kick, then proceeded to win the ball from him and shoot it into the empty goal. The goal was named "Goal of the Week" by ARD and thus made it into the selection for "Goal of the Month".

=== Union Berlin ===
After the relegation of Rot-Weiss Essen, Younga followed his coach Uwe Neuhaus to Union Berlin. There he struggled to find playing time in his first season and was temporarily demoted to the reserve team. In the following season, Younga was able to develop into an integral part of the team and make a major contribution to Union's return to the 2. Bundesliga. With Union he managed survival in the second tier for two consecutive seasons. He was a reserve player in the 2010–11 season. His foul on VfL Bochum player Matías Concha also caused a stir, as he suffered a broken tibia and fibula. Younga was then sued by Concha for €200,000 in damages, but the Berlin-Tegel Regional Court dismissed the lawsuit in August 2012. At the end of the season, his contract with Union was not extended. He then moved back to the Rhineland to FC Wegberg-Beeck in the sixth tier Mittelrheinliga.

== Managerial career ==
Since February 2014, Younga has been the under-19 coach of 1. FC Düren.

== Career statistics ==
=== International ===
Appearances and goals by national team and year
National team	Year	Apps	Goals
Congo	1992	3	1
Congo	1993	1	0
Congo	1994	1	0
Congo	1995	–	
Congo	1996	3	0
Congo	1997	3	3
Congo	1998	1	0
Congo	1999	3	0
Congo	2000	2	0
Total		17	4

Scores and results list Congo's goal tally first, score column indicates score after each Younga-Mohani goal.

List of international goals scored by Macchambes Younga-Mohani
No.	Date	Venue	Opponent	Score	Result	Competition
1	30 August 1992	Stade Alphonse Massemba-Débat, Brazzaville, Congo	Chad	2–0	2–0	1994 Africa Cup of Nations qualification
2	6 April 1997	Stade Municipal, Pointe-Noire, Congo	South Africa	1–0	2–0	1998 FIFA World Cup qualification
3	6 April 1997	Stade Municipal, Pointe-Noire, Congo	South Africa	2–0	2–0	1998 FIFA World Cup qualification
4	8 June 1997	Stade Municipal, Pointe-Noire, Congo	DR Congo	1–0	1–0	1998 FIFA World Cup qualification
