= Hesham Hanafy =

Egyptian footballer (born 1973)

Personal information
- Date of birth: 12 August 1973 (age 53)
- Place of birth: Cairo, Egypt
- Position: Midfielder

Senior career*
Years	Team	Apps	(Gls)
1994–2001	Al-Ahly		
2002–2006	Haras El-Hodood		

International career
1995–1999	Egypt	15	(2)
- * Club domestic league appearances and goals

Hesham Hanafy (born 12 August 1973) is an Egyptian former footballer. He was a member of the Egypt national football team during his rise at Al-Ahly. Hanafy made several appearances for the Egypt national football team, including 1998 FIFA World Cup qualifying matches.

== International Goals ==
Scores and results list Egypt's goal tally first.

#	Date	Venue	Opponent	Score	Result	Competition
1.	27 July 1997	Alexandria Stadium, Egypt	Ethiopia	2–0	8-1	1998 Africa Cup of Nations qualifier
2.	17 August 1997	Cairo International Stadium, Egypt	Liberia	2–0	5–0	1998 FIFA World Cup qualifier
