= Edelbert Dinha =

Zimbabwean footballer (born 1973)

Personal information
- Date of birth: 13 March 1973 (age 53)
- Place of birth: Salisbury, Rhodesia
- Position: Midfielder

Senior career*
Years	Team	Apps	(Gls)
1992–1993	Darryn T	50	(21)
1993–1994	CAPS United FC	16	(1)
1994–1995	Sokół Pniewy	2	(0)
1995–1996	Sokół Tychy	3	(0)
1996–1998	CAPS United FC	96	(11)
1998–2002	Ajax Cape Town	130	(8)
2002–2006	Orlando Pirates	53	(3)
2006–2007	FC AK	17	(3)
2007–2008	Mpumalanga Black Aces		

International career
1997–2006	Zimbabwe	12	
- * Club domestic league appearances and goals as of 24 October 2013

Edelbert Dinha (born 13 March 1973 in Salisbury) is a Zimbabwean former professional footballer who played as a midfielder.

He works at Shumba Sports Management. He is the agent of Archford Gutu and Rodreck Mutuma.

== International career ==
He was a member of the Zimbabwean 2006 African Nations Cup team, who finished bottom of their group in the first round of competition, thus failing to secure qualification for the quarter-finals.

== Clubs ==
- 1993–1994: CAPS United FC
- 1994–1995: Petrolofisi
- 1994–1995: Sokół Pniewy
- 1995–1996: Sokół Tychy
- 1996–1998: CAPS United FC
- 1998–1999: Seven Stars
- 1999–2002: Ajax Cape Town
- 2002–2006: Orlando Pirates
- 2006–2007: FC AK
- 2008: Mpumalanga Black Aces
