= Andrew Tembo =

Zambian footballer (born 1971)

Personal information
- Full name: Andrew Tembo
- Date of birth: 19 August 1971 (age 55)
- Place of birth: Lusaka, Zambia
- Height: 6 ft 1 in (1.85 m)
- Position: Midfielder

Youth career
- –1991: Zamsure F.C.

Senior career*
Years	Team	Apps	(Gls)
1991–1996	Zamsure F.C.		
1994–1995	Marseille	2	(0)
1997–2006	OB	248	(14)
2006–2007	Ølstykke	23	(0)
2007–2008	Hjørring	0	(0)
2008–2010	B1909		

International career
1995–2001	Zambia	48	(9)
- * Club domestic league appearances and goals

Andrew Tembo (born 19 August 1971) is a former Zambian football midfielder.

== Career ==
Tembo previously played 284 matches and scored 15 goals for Odense BK, having joined them in the summer of 1997. Prior to that he played for Zamsure FC. He also had a one-season spell at Marseille.

Tembo earned 35 caps for the Zambia national team. As a young player in April 1993 he almost boarded the fateful flight which killed the entire Zambia squad, however he was asked not to board the flight at the last minute.

In 2012, he was selected to Odense BKs all-time top-11 "De største striber" (The greatest "stripes") by OBs fans.

== Career statistics ==
=== International ===
Appearances and goals by national team and year
National team	Year	Apps	Goals
Zambia	1993	1	0
Zambia	1994	–	
Zambia	1995	6	4
Zambia	1996	16	2
Zambia	1997	8	2
Zambia	1998	7	1
Zambia	1999	4	0
Zambia	2000	3	0
Zambia	2001	3	0
Total		37	9

Scores and results list Zambia's goal tally first, score column indicates score after each Tembo goal.

List of international goals scored by Andrew Tembo
No.	Date	Venue	Opponent	Score	Result	Competition
1	5 November 1995	Independence Stadium, Lusaka, Zambia	Jamaica	1–0	4–2	Friendly
2	5 November 1995	Independence Stadium, Lusaka, Zambia	Jamaica	4–2	4–2	Friendly
3	24 November 1995	Mmabatho Stadium, Mafikeng, South Africa	Zimbabwe	1–1	1–1	1995 Simba Cup
4	26 November 1995	FNB Stadium, Johannesburg, South Africa	Egypt	1–3	1–3	1995 Simba Cup
5	16 June 1996	Independence Stadium, Lusaka, Zambia	Sudan	3–0	3–0	1998 FIFA World Cup qualification
6	25 September 1996	Prince Saud bin Jalawi Sports City Stadium, Khobar, Saudi Arabia	Saudi Arabia	3–0	3–1	Friendly
7	25 January 1997	Chichiri Stadium, Blantyre, Malawi	Malawi	2–0	2–0	1998 Africa Cup of Nations qualification
8	9 April 1997	National Sports Stadium, Harare, Zimbabwe	Zaire	2–2	2–2	1998 FIFA World Cup qualification
9	16 January 1998	Independence Stadium, Bakau, Gambia	Gambia	2–0	2–0	Friendly

== Honours ==
OB

- Danish Cup: 2001–02
