= Kossi Noutsoudje =

Togolese footballer

Personal information
- Date of birth: 16 October 1977 (age 49)
- Position: Striker

Senior career*
Years	Team	Apps	(Gls)
1994–1997	Entente II		
1998–1999	Goldfields Obuasi		
2000–2001	ASEC Mimosas		
2002–2003	Goldfields Obuasi		
2004–2007	ASFA Yennenga		

International career^{‡}
1994–2002	Togo	37	(13)
- * Club domestic league appearances and goals as of 1 August 2020 ‡ National team caps and goals as of 1 August 2020

Kossi Noutsoudje (born 16 October 1977) is a retired Togolese football striker. He was a squad member for the 1998 African Cup of Nations. Playing in four countries, he became league champion in 2000 and 2001 with ASEC Mimosas and in 2006 with ASFA Yennega.

== International goals ==
Scores and results list Togo's goal tally first, score column indicates score after each Noutsoudje goal.

List of international goals scored by Kossi Noutsoudje
No.	Date	Venue	Opponent	Score	Result	Competition	Ref.
1	2 June 1996	Stade de Kégué, Lomé, Togo	Senegal	2-1	2-1	1998 FIFA World Cup qualification	
2	20 August 1996	Stade Municipal, Lomé, Togo	Benin	1-0	2-0	Friendly	
3	10 November 1996	Stade Municipal, Lomé, Togo	Cameroon	1-2	2-4	1998 FIFA World Cup qualification	
4	23 February 1997	Stade Municipal, Lomé, Togo	DR Congo	1-1	1-1	1998 African Cup of Nations qualification	
5	13 July 1997	Stade Municipal, Lomé, Togo	Liberia	2-0	4-0	1998 African Cup of Nations qualification	
6	11 January 1998	Stade Municipal, Lomé, Togo	Mozambique	1-0	1-2	Friendly	
7	2 August 1998	Stade Omar Bongo, Libreville, Gabon	São Tomé and Príncipe	1-0	4-0	2000 African Cup of Nations qualification	
8	2 August 1998	Stade Omar Bongo, Libreville, Gabon	São Tomé and Príncipe	2-0	4-0	2000 African Cup of Nations qualification	
9	18 August 1998	Stade Municipal, Lomé, Togo	São Tomé and Príncipe	1-0	2-0	2000 African Cup of Nations qualification	
10	3 January 1999	Felix Houphouet Boigny Stadium, Abidjan, Ivory Coast	Ivory Coast	1-3	1-3	Friendly	
11	28 February 1999	Stade Municipal, Lomé, Togo	Morocco	1-1	2-3	2000 African Cup of Nations qualification	
12	8 October 2000	Stade de Kégué, Lomé, Togo	Uganda	2-0	3-0	2002 African Cup of Nations qualification	
13	17 June 2001	Stade de Kégué, Lomé, Togo	Senegal	1-0	1-0	2002 African Cup of Nations qualification	
