= Robert Clarke (footballer) =

Liberian footballer

Personal information
- Date of birth: 4 September 1967 (age 59)

Senior career*
Years	Team	Apps	(Gls)
1992–1993	Mechelen	14	(2)
1993–1994	SV Prüm	15	(4)
1994–1995	Sportfreunde Eisbachtal		
1995–1996	FC Saarbrücken	10	(0)
1996–1997	SV Elversbrg	27	(4)
1997–1998	Athinaikos	11	(0)
1998–1999	Doxa Katokopias		

International career
1995–1997	Liberia	12	(1)
- * Club domestic league appearances and goals

Robert Clarke (born 4 September 1967) is a Liberian former professional footballer who played in twelve matches for the Liberia national team from 1995 to 1997. He was also named in Liberia's squad for the 1996 African Cup of Nations tournament.
