= Kennedy Chihuri =

Zimbabwean footballer (born 1969)

Personal information
- Date of birth: 2 April 1969 (age 57)
- Place of birth: Zimbabwe
- Height: 1.78 m (5 ft 10 in)
- Position: Midfielder

Youth career
- 1981–1986: CAPS United

Senior career*
Years	Team	Apps	(Gls)
1986–1994	Chapungu United		
1994–1996	Tatran Prešov	49	(6)
1996	Slavia Prague	4	(0)
1997–2004	Viktoria Žižkov	196	(26)

International career
1994–2003	Zimbabwe	30	(0)
- * Club domestic league appearances and goals

Kennedy Chihuri (born 2 April 1969) is a Zimbabwean retired footballer. He played 200 matches in the Czech First League, almost all of them for FK Viktoria Žižkov. He was the first black player in the Czech league. He won the Czech Cup with Žižkov in the 2000–01 season. Chihuri made 30 appearances for the Zimbabwe national football team.
