= Momo Wandel Soumah (footballer) =

Guinean footballer

Personal information
- Date of birth: 20 April 1977
- Date of death: 13 February 2017 (aged 39)
- Place of death: Conakry, Guinea
- Position: Forward

Senior career*
Years	Team	Apps	(Gls)
1994–1996	AS Kaloum		
1996–1998	Étoile Sportive du Sahel		
1998–2000	ASC Jeanne d'Arc		
2000–2002	ASEC Mimosas		

International career
1996–1998	Guinea	13	(5)
- * Club domestic league appearances and goals

Momo Wandel Soumah (20 April 1977 – 13 February 2017) was a Guinean professional footballer who played as a forward. He played in 13 matches for the Guinea national football team from 1996 to 1998. He was also named in Guinea's squad for the 1998 African Cup of Nations tournament. Soumah died of a heart attack in 2017 during training to become a professional football referee.
