= Abu Kanu (footballer, born 1972) =

Sierra Leonean footballer

Personal information
- Full name: Abu Kanu
- Date of birth: 31 March 1972 (age 54)
- Place of birth: Magburaka, Sierra Leone
- Position: Striker

Youth career
- Freetown United

Senior career*
Years	Team	Apps	(Gls)
1993–1995	East End Lions		
1995–1996	Spånga IS		
1997	Penang FA		
1997–1999	Slaven Belupo	32	(2)
2008–2009	Old Edwardians		

International career
1990–1997	Sierra Leone	15	(8)

Managerial career
- FC Knokke (youth coach)
- Sierra Leone
- * Club domestic league appearances and goals

Abu Kanu, commonly known as Gbanaloko, (born 31 March 1972 in Magburaka) is a retired Sierra Leonean football striker. Kanu was a member of the Leone Stars squad that participated in the 1994 African Nations Cup in Tunisia. He is the second highest all-time goal scorer for the Sierra Leone national football team with 15 goals, an during his playing days with Sierra Leone, Kanu was most prolific scorer in the team.

Kanu had a spell with NK Slaven Belupo in the Prva HNL.
