= Emeka Mamale =

Democratic Republic of the Congo footballer (1977–2020)

Personal information
- Full name: Emeka Esanga Mamale
- Date of birth: 21 October 1977
- Place of birth: Zaire
- Date of death: 25 June 2020 (aged 42)
- Position: Striker

Senior career*
Years	Team	Apps	(Gls)
1995–1996	DC Motema Pembe		
1996–1997	Pohang Steelers	6	(1)
- Charleroi
- QwaQwa Stars
–2000	Kaizer Chiefs		
2000–2001	Lokeren		
- AC Cabinda
–2003	Osseka		
2003–2004	1º de Agosto		
- Silver Stars
2007–2008	Hapoel Acre	7	(1)
2009	TC Elima		
2010–2011	DC Motema Pembe		

International career
- Congo DR
Medal record
Representing DR Congo
Men's football
Africa Cup of Nations
Third place	1998 Burkina Faso
- * Club domestic league appearances and goals

Emeka Esanga Mamale(21 October 1977 – 25 June 2020) was a football player from the DR Congo.

== Career ==
At age 33, Mamale joined Matadi side TC Elima on a six-month contract.

He represented his country at the 1996, 1998 and 2000 African Cup of Nations.

He died on 25 June 2020.

== Career statistics ==
=== International ===
Scores and results list DR Congo's goal tally first, score column indicates score after each Mamale goal.

List of international goals scored by Emeka Mamale
No.	Date	Venue	Opponent	Score	Result	Competition
1	2 June 1996	Anjalay Stadium, Mapou, Mauritius	Mauritius	1–0	5–1	1998 FIFA World Cup qualification

== Honours ==
DR Congo

- African Cup of Nations: 3rd place, 1998
