= Brice Mackaya =

Gabonese footballer

Personal information
- Date of birth: 23 July 1968 (age 58)
- Place of birth: Moanda, Gabon
- Height: 1.77 m (5 ft 10 in)
- Position: Forward

Senior career*
Years	Team	Apps	(Gls)
1986–1994	Petrosport	155	(70)
1995	Vasas	2	(0)
1995–1996	Vác	9	(1)
1996–2001	Petrosport	83	(30)
Total		249	(101)

International career
1992–1999	Gabon	38	(15)
- * Club domestic league appearances and goals

Brice Mackaya (born 23 July 1968) is a Gabonese former professional footballer who played as a forward.

== Career statistics ==
=== International ===
Scores and results list Gabon's goal tally first, score column indicates score after each Mackaya goal.

List of international goals scored by Brice Mackaya
No.	Date	Venue	Opponent	Score	Result	Competition	Ref.
1	14 June 1992	Stade Omar Bongo, Libreville, Gabon	Togo	1–0	1–0	Friendly	
2	11 July 1993	Stade Omar Bongo, Libreville, Gabon	Niger	3–0	3–0	1994 African Cup of Nations qualification	
3	13 November 1994	Stade Omar Bongo, Libreville, Gabon	Mauritius	3–0	3–0	1996 African Cup of Nations qualification	
4	4 June 1995	Stade George V, Curepipe, Mauritius	Mauritius	1–0	3–0	1996 African Cup of Nations qualification	
5	26 November 1995	Stade Omar Bongo, Libreville, Gabon	Cameroon	1–1	1–2	Friendly	
6	30 November 1995	Stade Omar Bongo, Libreville, Gabon	Algeria	2–1	2–1	Friendly	
7	22 December 1995	Stade du 4 Août, Ouagadougou, Burkina Faso	Burkina Faso	5–2	5–2	Friendly	
8	7 January 1996	National Sports Stadium, Harare, Zimbabwe	Zimbabwe	–	2–1	Friendly	
9	7 January 1996	National Sports Stadium, Harare, Zimbabwe	Zimbabwe	–	2–1	Friendly	
10	19 January 1996	Kings Park Stadium, Durban, South Africa	Zaire	1–0	2–0	1996 African Cup of Nations	
11	28 January 1996	Kings Park Stadium, Durban, South Africa	Tunisia	1–1	1–1	1996 African Cup of Nations	
12	16 June 1996	Stade Omar Bongo, Libreville, Gabon	Swaziland	1–0	2–0	1998 FIFA World Cup qualification	
