= Abubakar Kamara =

Sierra Leonean footballer (born 1970)

Personal information
- Date of birth: 19 August 1970 (age 56)
- Place of birth: Freetown, Sierra Leone

International career
Years	Team	Apps	(Gls)
1994–1997	Sierra Leone	12	(0)

Abubakar Kamara (born 19 August 1970) is a Sierra Leonean footballer. He played in 12 matches for the Sierra Leone national football team from 1994 to 1997. He was also named in Sierra Leone's squad for the 1994 African Cup of Nations tournament.
