= Brahima Traoré =

Burkinabé footballer & manager (born 1974)

Personal information
- Date of birth: 24 February 1974 (age 52)
- Place of birth: Upper Volta
- Position: Midfielder

Senior career*
Years	Team	Apps	(Gls)
–1992	ASFA Yennenga		
1992–1998	FC Bressuire		
2001–2002	Persib Bandung		

International career
1991–2000	Burkina Faso	38	(3)

Managerial career
- 2012: Al Dhaid FC (assistant)
- * Club domestic league appearances and goals

Brahima Traoré (born 24 February 1974) is a Burkinabé football manager and former player.

== Club career ==
A midfielder, Traoré played for ASFA Yennenga, FC Bressuire.

== International career ==
Traoré played for the Burkina Faso national team at the 1996, 1998 and 2000 African Cup of Nations.

== Coaching career ==
In 2012, Traoré worked as assistant manager for Al Dhaid FC.
