= Epotele Bazamba =

Congolese footballer

Personal information
- Date of birth: 13 May 1976 (age 50)
- Position: Midfielder

Senior career*
| Years | Team | Apps | (Gls) |
- AS Dragons

International career
| 1997–2001 | DR Congo | 18 | (1) |
Medal record
Representing DR Congo
Men's football
Africa Cup of Nations
| Third place | 1998 Burkina Faso |
- * Club domestic league appearances and goals

Epotele Bazamba (born 13 May 1976) is a Congolese former footballer who played as a midfielder. He played in 18 matches for the DR Congo national team from 1997 to 2001. He was also named in the DR Congo's squad for the 1998 African Cup of Nations tournament.

== Honours ==
DR Congo

- African Cup of Nations: 3rd place, 1998
