= Khalid Raghib =

Moroccan footballer (born 1969)

Personal information
- Date of birth: 22 September 1969 (age 57)
- Position: Midfielder

International career
Years	Team	Apps	(Gls)
- Morocco

Khalid Raghib (born 22 September 1969) is a Moroccan former footballer. He competed in the 1992 Summer Olympics.
