= Jean-Claude Mukanya =

Swiss footballer (born 1968)

Personal information
- Full name: Jean-Claude Mukanya Kabeya
- Date of birth: 1 May 1968 (age 58)
- Place of birth: Switzerland
- Height: 1.87 m (6 ft 2 in)
- Position: Defender

Senior career*
| Years | Team | Apps | (Gls) |
| 1987–1989 | KFC Eeklo | | |
| 1989–1996 | KFC Lommel | 100 | (10) |
| 1996–1997 | NAC Breda | 9 | (0) |
| 1997–1999 | Eendracht Aalst | 47 | (3) |
| 1999–2001 | Hapoel Be'er Sheva | | |

International career
| 1991–1999 | DR Congo | | |
- * Club domestic league appearances and goals

Jean-Claude Mukanya (born 1 May 1968) is a former professional footballer who played as a defender in Belgium for KFC Eeklo, KFC Lommel and Eendracht Aalst, in the Netherlands for NAC Breda and in Israel for Hapoel Be'er Sheva. Born in Switzerland, he represented the DR Congo national team at international level.
