= Lucien Bouchardeau =

Nigerien football referee (1961–2018)

- Bouchardeau in 1998
- Full name: Lucien Bouchardeau
- Born: 18 December 1961; Niamey, Niger
- Died: 20 February 2018 (aged 56); Niamey, Niger

International
Years	League	Role

Lucien Bouchardeau (18 December 1961 – 20 February 2018) was a Nigerien football referee. Born in Niamey, he is best remembered for having officiated the 1998 FIFA World Cup first-round match between the teams of Italy and Chile. He called a penalty against Chile in the 85th minute, which allowed Italy the chance to tie the match 2–2. Following the game he talked to the press about his fear he would be sacked from the tournament, which would mark the end of his career. He also officiated matches at the 1996 Olympics, 1997 Confederations Cup and the 1998 and 1996 African Cup of Nations. He died on 20 February 2018 at the age of 56 from heart failure.

== Selected record ==
1998 FIFA World Cup – France
Date	Match	Result	Stadium	Role
11 June 1998	Italy – Chile	2–2	Stade Chaban-Delmas, Bordeaux	Main referee
21 June 1998	United States – Iran	1–2	Stade de Gerland, Lyon	Fourth official
