= Étienne N'tsunda =

Congolese footballer

Personal information
- Full name: Étienne N'tsunda Mvumbi
- Date of birth: 20 November 1974 (age 51)
- Place of birth: Kinshasa, Zaire
- Height: 1.70 m (5 ft 7 in)
- Position: Forward

Youth career
- Orlando Pirates

Senior career*
Years	Team	Apps	(Gls)
1992–1994	Orlando Pirates		
1994–1995	Porto	0	(0)
1994–1995	→ Penafiel (loan)	18	(7)
1995–1996	Académica	29	(7)
1996–1998	Chaves	44	(4)
1998–1999	Vitória Guimarães	8	(0)
1999–2000	Koblenz		
2000–2001	Freamunde	6	(0)
2001	Famalicão		
2002–2004	SuperSport United		

International career
?–?	DR Congo	16	(2)
- * Club domestic league appearances and goals

Étienne N'tsunda Mvumbi (born 20 November 1974), known as N'tsunda, is a Congolese retired footballer who played as a forward.

He played most of his 12-year professional career in Portugal and South Africa.

== Club career ==
Born in Kinshasa, N'tsunda started playing professionally in South Africa, with Orlando Pirates FC. In 1994, aged 19, he moved to FC Porto in Portugal, but never appeared officially for the club, going on to resume his career in the country's second division, first with F.C. Penafiel on loan.

N'tsunda made his Primeira Liga debut in the 1996–97 season, scoring two goals in 28 games for G.D. Chaves to help the northerners finish in tenth position. On 30 January 1998 he came from the bench to net twice in a 3–2 home win against Sporting Clube de Portugal and, in March, signed for fellow league side Vitória de Guimarães, where he appeared rarely due to injury.

After one year in Germany with lowly TuS Koblenz, N'tsunda returned to Portugal and its second level, appearing with little impact for S.C. Freamunde. He subsequently competed in division three with F.C. Famalicão, finishing his career at only 29 with SuperSport United F.C. in South Africa.
