= René Taelman =

Belgian football manager (1945–2019)

René Taelman (5 May 1945 – 13 August 2019) was a Belgian football manager.

== Career ==
Taelman managed Burkina Faso (2000 African Cup of Nations), Benin, Cercle Brugge K.S.V., JS Kabylie (2005) and Akhdar in the Libyan Premier League.
