= Zico Tumba =

Democratic Republic of the Congo footballer (born 1977)

Personal information
- Date of birth: 29 April 1977 (age 49)
- Place of birth: Kinshasa, Zaire
- Position: Forward

Senior career*
Years	Team	Apps	(Gls)
1996–1998	Metz	11	(2)
1997–1998	→ Mulhouse (loan)	36	(11)
1998–2000	De Graafschap	59	(10)
2001–2004	NEC	72	(11)
2004–2005	Sète 34	20	(3)
2005–2006	USL Dunkerque	4	(0)
2006–2008	CS Avion		

International career
1997–1998	DR Congo	3	(1)
- * Club domestic league appearances and goals

Zico Tumba (born 29 April 1977) is a Congolese former professional footballer who played as a forward in France and the Netherlands. He gained three caps for the DR Congo national team.

== Club career ==
Born in Kinshasa, Zaire, Tumba came to Clermont-Ferrand, France with his father at age 11. He progressed through the youth academy of Metz alongside players such as Robert Pires and Louis Saha. In the 1996–97 season, Tumba made his debut in Ligue 1. He left for Mulhouse on loan in his second season at senior level, where he had a successful season and scored 12 times in 39 games.

His performances with Mulhouse earned him a move to the Netherlands, where he would initially play for De Graafschap for 3 seasons. Tumba played regularly and played 59 games and scored 10 times. In 2001, Tumba left for NEC, where he made 74 appearances and scored 11 goals.

After the 2003–04 season, Tumba decided to retire from professional football at the age of 27. In an interview in De Gelderlander he said: "Professional football is bad. The people who are in it are not honest and there is no respect. It's all about money. Today you are good and tomorrow everyone throws you away. That's not my world. I don't miss anything. I have a new life and I'm much happier with that."

Tumba moved to France and started playing football with the amateurs of Sète 34. There, he won promotion to the second division, but chose to leave for USL Dunkerque as he did not want to play at the professional level again. From 2006 to 2008, he played for CS Avion in the Régional 1, the sixth level of French football.

== International career ==
Tumba gained 3 caps for the DR Congo national team in which he scored 1 goal.

== After football ==
Tumba owned his own shop with African articles in Lens.

In March 2014, he became assistant coach of Le Touquet AC as well as coaching the women's team.
