= Nzelo Hervé Lembi =

Congolese footballer

Hervé Lembi
Personal information
- Full name: Nzelo Hervé Lembi
- Date of birth: 25 August 1975 (age 51)
- Place of birth: Kinshasa, Zaire
- Height: 1.82 m (5 ft 11 1/2 in)
- Position: Defender

Senior career*
Years	Team	Apps	(Gls)
1990–1991	Bingu		
1991–1992	AS Vita		
1992–1995	SC Lokeren	48	(13)
1995–2002	Club Brugge	134	(15)
2002–2006	1. FC Kaiserslautern	90	(3)
2006–2007	Metalurh Donetsk	14	(0)
2007–2009	Germinal Beerschot Antwerpen	17	(0)

International career
1994–2005	DR Congo	4	(1)
- * Club domestic league appearances and goals

Nzelo Hervé Lembi (born 25 August 1975) is a retired Congolese former football defender.

He joined Germinal Beerschot in autumn 2007.

Having lived in Belgium for ten years, he also holds Belgian nationality.

Lembi's father, Simon Lembi (known as "Lemons"), was also a Zaire international footballer.
