= Elos Elonga-Ekakia =

Democratic Republic of the Congo footballer

Personal information
- Date of birth: 5 February 1974 (age 52)
- Place of birth: Zaire
- Height: 1.78 m (5 ft 10 in)
- Position: Striker

Senior career*
Years	Team	Apps	(Gls)
1993	AS Vita Club		
1993–1994	Beveren	0	(0)
1994–1998	Lokeren	86	(29)
1998–1999	Club Brugge	20	(2)
1999–2002	Anderlecht	28	(10)
2002–2004	Royal Francs Borains	9	(2)
- SC Grimbergen
- SK Lochristi

International career
1994–1998	DR Congo	8	(2)
- * Club domestic league appearances and goals

Elos Elonga-Ekakia (born 5 February 1974) is a retired Congolese footballer who played at both professional and international levels, as a striker.

== Club career ==
After beginning his career at AS Vita Club, Elonga-Ekakia later played in Belgium for Beveren, Lokeren, Club Brugge, Anderlecht and Royal Francs Borains.

While at Anderlecht, Elonga-Ekakia nearly died in a car crash.

== International career ==
He was also a member of the DR Congo national team between 1994 and 1998. He has represented his country in 2 FIFA World Cup qualification matches.
