= Roger Lukaku =

Congolese footballer (1967–2025)

- Lukaku with Seraing in 1994

Personal information
- Full name: Roger Menama Lukaku
- Date of birth: 6 June 1967
- Place of birth: Kinshasa, Zaire (now DR Congo)
- Date of death: 28 September 2025 (aged 58)
- Place of death: Kinshasa, DR Congo
- Height: 1.86 m (6 ft 1 in)
- Position: Forward

Senior career*
Years	Team	Apps	(Gls)
1986	Vita Club		
1987–1990	Africa Sports		
1990–1993	Boom	43	(11)
1993–1995	Seraing	60	(27)
1995–1996	Germinal Ekeren	28	(3)
1996–1997	Gençlerbirliği	30	(4)
1997–1998	Mechelen	17	(4)
1998–1999	Oostende	20	(2)

International career
1990–1996	Zaire	13	(6)
- * Club domestic league appearances and goals

Roger Menama Lukaku (6 June 1967 – 28 September 2025) was a Congolese footballer who played as a forward. Throughout his career, he played for KV Oostende, KV Mechelen and Germinal Ekeren. He is the father of footballers Romelu Lukaku and Jordan Lukaku.

== Early life ==
Roger Lukaku was born in Zaire on 6 June 1967. He started out playing football for Vita Sports, a local club, before moving to Africa Sports d'Abidjan.

== Club career ==
In 1990, at the age of 23, Roger Lukaku began his career in Belgium. His first club was Belgian Second Division club FC Boom. With this club he achieved promotion to the Belgian First Division in 1992. The club was relegated in 1993 and Lukaku moved to RFC Seraing. With RFC Seraing he finished third in the Belgian First Division. He stayed with RFC Seraing for two seasons before moving to Germinal Ekeren. Again his club finished in third place. In 1996, he played for Turkish side Gençlerbirliği but he returned to Belgium after only one season to play for KV Mechelen. In 1998, he changed club and played for Belgian First Division side KV Oostende.

After the relegation of the club in 1999 the 32-year-old stopped playing professional football. He continued to play in lower divisions for RJS Ath-Maffle, KFC Wintam and in 2006 for KGR Katelijne where he finished his playing career in 2007.

== International career ==
Lukaku played for the Zaire national team in the 1994 FIFA World Cup qualifying rounds. He also participated at the 1994 and 1996 African Cup of Nations finals. In total he scored 6 goals in 13 matches.

== Personal life and death ==
After retiring, he and his wife Adolphine fell into poverty. He was the father of professional footballers Romelu Lukaku and Jordan Lukaku and uncle of Boli Bolingoli.

He was arrested on 29 March 2013 after being sentenced in absentia to 15 months in prison for assaulting his girlfriend on two occasions in February 2011 and January 2012. He requested provisional release, because he did not receive a court notification and subsequently could not defend himself in court. This was granted and he was released from prison after eleven days. He was given a new trial on 24 June 2013, where he was sentenced to 120 hours of community service.

Lukaku died on 28 September 2025, at the age of 58.
