= 1996 African Cup of Nations squads =

List of footballers

Below is a list of squads used in the 1996 African Cup of Nations.

== Group A ==
=== South Africa ===
Head coach: (South Africa) Clive Barker

No.	Pos.	Player	Date of birth (age)	Caps	Club
1	GK	Andre Arendse	27 June 1967 (aged 28)		(South Africa) Cape Town Spurs
16	GK	Roger De Sá	1 October 1964 (aged 31)		(South Africa) Mamelodi Sundowns
22	GK	John Tlale	15 May 1967 (aged 28)		(South Africa) QwaQwa Stars
5	DF	Mark Fish	14 March 1974 (aged 21)		(South Africa) Orlando Pirates
13	DF	Edward Motale	29 July 1966 (aged 29)		(South Africa) Orlando Pirates
2	DF	Sizwe Motaung	7 January 1970 (aged 26)		(South Africa) Mamelodi Sundowns
3	DF	David Nyathi	22 March 1969 (aged 26)		(South Africa) Cape Town Spurs
4	DF	Lucas Radebe	12 April 1969 (aged 26)		(England) Leeds United
9	DF	Neil Tovey (c)	2 April 1962 (aged 33)		(South Africa) Kaizer Chiefs
14	DF	Andrew Tucker	25 December 1968 (aged 27)		(South Africa) Pretoria City
8	MF	Linda Buthelezi	28 June 1969 (aged 26)		(South Africa) Mamelodi Sundowns
15	MF	Doctor Khumalo	26 June 1967 (aged 28)		(South Africa) Kaizer Chiefs
20	MF	Augustine Makalakalane	15 September 1965 (aged 30)		(Switzerland) Zürich
19	MF	Helman Mkhalele	20 October 1969 (aged 26)		(South Africa) Orlando Pirates
18	MF	John Moeti	30 August 1967 (aged 28)		(South Africa) Orlando Pirates
12	MF	Zane Moosa	23 September 1968 (aged 27)		(South Africa) Mamelodi Sundowns
10	MF	John Moshoeu	18 December 1965 (aged 30)		(Turkey) Kocaelispor
21	MF	Eric Tinkler	30 July 1970 (aged 25)		(Portugal) Vitória de Setúbal
17	FW	Shaun Bartlett	31 October 1972 (aged 23)		(South Africa) Cape Town Spurs
6	FW	Philemon Masinga	28 June 1969 (aged 26)		(England) Leeds United
7	FW	Daniel Mudau	4 September 1968 (aged 27)		(South Africa) Mamelodi Sundowns
11	FW	Mark Williams	11 August 1966 (aged 29)		(England) Wolverhampton Wanderers

=== Cameroon ===
Head coach: (Cameroon) Jules-Frederic Nyongha

No.	Pos.	Player	Date of birth (age)	Caps	Club
1	GK	William Andem	14 June 1968 (aged 27)		(Brazil) Cruzeiro
16	GK	Alioum Boukar	3 January 1972 (aged 24)		(Turkey) Samsunspor
21	GK	Vincent Ongandzi	22 November 1975 (aged 20)		(Cameroon) Tonnerre Yaoundé
15	DF	Hans Agbo	26 September 1967 (aged 28)		(Cameroon) Olympic Mvolyé
5	DF	Bertin Ebwellé	11 September 1962 (aged 33)		(Cameroon) Canon Yaoundé
4	DF	Tobie Mimboe	30 June 1964 (aged 31)		(Paraguay) Cerro Porteño
14	DF	Michel Ndoumbé	1 January 1971 (aged 25)		(Hungary) Újpest
17	DF	Rigobert Song	1 July 1976 (aged 19)		(France) Metz
3	DF	Pierre Womé	26 March 1979 (aged 16)		(Cameroon) Canon Yaoundé
8	MF	Marc-Vivien Foé	1 May 1975 (aged 20)		(France) Lens
12	MF	Sunday Jang	25 December 1973 (aged 22)		(Cameroon) Olympic Mvolyé
19	MF	Marcel Mahouvé	16 January 1973 (aged 22)		(Cameroon) Tonnerre Yaoundé
20	MF	Georges Mouyeme	15 April 1971 (aged 24)		(France) Angers
6	MF	Roland Njume Ntoko	30 November 1972 (aged 23)		(Slovenia) Publikum
10	MF	Augustine Simo	18 September 1978 (aged 17)		(Italy) Torino
18	MF	Joseph Tchango	28 November 1978 (aged 17)		(Cameroon) Coton Sport
11	FW	Nicolas Dikoume	21 November 1973 (aged 22)		(Cameroon) Canon Yaoundé
2	FW	Joseph Mbarga	2 July 1975 (aged 20)		(Cameroon) Olympic Mvolyé
13	FW	Basile Essa Mvondo	19 April 1978 (aged 17)		(Cameroon) Aigle Nkongsamba
7	FW	François Omam-Biyik	21 May 1966 (aged 29)		(Mexico) América
9	FW	Alphonse Tchami	14 September 1971 (aged 24)		(Argentina) Boca Juniors
22	FW	Bernard Tchoutang	2 September 1976 (aged 19)		(Turkey) Vanspor

=== Egypt ===
Head coach: (Netherlands) Ruud Krol

No.	Pos.	Player	Date of birth (age)	Caps	Club
1	GK	Nader El-Sayed	31 December 1972 (aged 23)		(Egypt) Al-Zamalek
22	GK	Essam Abdel-Azim	1 November 1970 (aged 25)		(Egypt) Al-Ittihad Al-Iskandary
21	GK	Sayed El-Swerky			(Egypt) Ismaily SC
2	DF	Yasser Radwan	22 April 1972 (aged 23)		(Egypt) Baladeyet El-Mahalla
3	DF	Fawzi Gamal	23 October 1966 (aged 29)		(Egypt) Ismaily SC
4	DF	Hany Ramzy	10 March 1969 (aged 26)		(Germany) Werder Bremen
5	DF	Samir Ibrahim Kamouna	2 April 1972 (aged 23)		(Egypt) Al-Mokawloon al-Arab
6	DF	Medhat Abdel-Hady	12 June 1974 (aged 21)		(Egypt) Al-Zamalek
7	DF	Hamza El-Gamal	2 March 1970 (aged 25)		(Egypt) Ismaily SC
9	MF	Mohamed Kamouna	13 June 1969 (aged 26)		(Egypt) El Mansoura SC
12	MF	Ismail Youssef	28 June 1964 (aged 31)		(Egypt) Al-Zamalek
13	MF	Moustafa Reyad	6 February 1966 (aged 29)		(Egypt) Al-Masry
14	MF	Hazem Emam	10 May 1975 (aged 20)		(Egypt) Al-Zamalek
11	MF	Magdy Tolba	24 December 1964 (aged 31)		(Egypt) Al Ahly
17	MF	Ahmed Hassan	2 May 1975 (aged 20)		(Egypt) Ismaily SC
19	MF	Abdel Sattar Sabry	19 June 1974 (aged 21)		(Egypt) Al-Mokawloon al-Arab
20	MF	Hady Khashaba	19 December 1972 (aged 23)		(Egypt) Al Ahly
16	FW	Mohamed Salah Abougreisha	1 January 1970 (aged 26)		(Egypt) Ismaily SC
10	FW	Ahmed El-Kass	8 July 1965 (aged 30)		(Egypt) Al-Zamalek
15	FW	Ali Maher	3 December 1973 (aged 22)		(Egypt) Tersana
18	FW	Ahmed "Koushary" Abdel Monem	8 January 1971 (aged 25)		(Egypt) Al Ahly
8	FW	Ibrahim El-Masry	19 August 1971 (aged 24)		(Egypt) Al-Masry

=== Angola ===
Head coach: (Portugal) Carlos Alhinho

No.	Pos.	Player	Date of birth (age)	Caps	Club
1	GK	Orlando Dias de Camargo	25 February 1966 (aged 29)		(Tunisia) Espérance Tunis
22	GK	Rui Hélio Tatá Ferrão Mateus			(Portugal) Caçadores das Taipas
12	GK	Simao Paulo	31 December 1969 (aged 26)		(Angola) Saneamento Rangol
2	DF	Amadeu	6 April 1966 (aged 29)		(Portugal) Penafiel
5	DF	Neto	10 October 1971 (aged 24)		(Angola) Primeiro de Agosto
13	DF	Aurélio	18 April 1974 (aged 21)		(Angola) Petro de Luanda
21	DF	Fua	7 April 1969 (aged 26)		(Portugal) União de Leiria
4	DF	Hélder Vicente	30 September 1975 (aged 20)		(Angola) Primeiro de Agosto
16	DF	Wilson	13 March 1969 (aged 26)		(Portugal) Gil Vicente
14	DF	Minhonha	3 November 1966 (aged 29)		(Angola) Primeiro de Maio
20	MF	Abel Campos	4 May 1962 (aged 33)		(Portugal) Alverca
6	MF	Carlos Pedro	6 April 1969 (aged 26)		(Portugal) Espinho
8	MF	Castela	7 February 1970 (aged 25)		(Angola) Primeiro de Maio
18	MF	Diogo	20 May 1969 (aged 26)		(Angola) Primeiro de Maio
9	MF	Joni	25 March 1970 (aged 25)		(Portugal) Salgueiros
7	MF	Paulão	22 October 1969 (aged 26)		(Portugal) Benfica
19	MF	Walter	20 November 1967 (aged 28)		(Portugal) Vitória de Guimarães
10	MF	Akwá	30 May 1977 (aged 18)		(Portugal) Alverca
17	FW	Luizinho	11 August 1969 (aged 26)		(Portugal) Braga
15	FW	Quinzinho	4 March 1974 (aged 21)		(Portugal) Porto
3	FW	Rosário			(Angola) Petro de Luanda
11	FW	Túbia	15 August 1966 (aged 29)		(Portugal) Desportivo das Aves

== Group B ==
=== Zambia ===
Head coach: (Denmark) Roald Poulsen

No.	Pos.	Player	Date of birth (age)	Caps	Club
22	GK	Collins Mbulo	15 January 1970 (aged 25)		(Zambia) Mufulira Wanderers
16	GK	Davies Phiri	1 April 1976 (aged 19)		(Zambia) Kabwe Warriors
1	GK	James Phiri	8 February 1969 (aged 26)		(Zambia) Zanaco FC
13	DF	Aggrey Chiyangi	5 June 1964 (aged 31)		(Zambia) Power Dynamos FC
2	DF	Harrison Chongo	5 June 1969 (aged 26)		(Saudi Arabia) Al Taawon
21	DF	Allan Kamwanga	30 October 1968 (aged 27)		(Zambia) Mufulira Wanderers
3	DF	Elijah Litana	5 December 1970 (aged 25)		(Saudi Arabia) Al-Hilal
19	DF	Hillary Makasa	12 January 1976 (aged 20)		(Zambia) Roan United
20	DF	Mordon Malitoli	5 August 1968 (aged 27)		(Zambia) Nkana Red Devils
5	DF	Jones Mwewa	12 March 1973 (aged 22)		(Zambia) Power Dynamos FC
17	MF	Joel Bwalya	24 October 1972 (aged 23)		(Belgium) Cercle Brugge
7	MF	Johnson Bwalya	3 December 1967 (aged 28)		(Switzerland) SC Kriens
15	MF	John Lungu	12 June 1966 (aged 29)		(Zambia) Roan United
4	MF	Kenneth Malitoli	20 August 1966 (aged 29)		(Tunisia) Espérance
14	MF	Bilton Musonda	9 April 1971 (aged 24)		(Zambia) Mufulira Wanderers
10	MF	Vincent Mutale	28 April 1973 (aged 22)		(Zambia) Mufulira Wanderers
6	MF	Alex Namazaba	5 May 1973 (aged 22)		(Zambia) Lusaka Dynamos
12	MF	Andrew Tembo	19 August 1971 (aged 24)		(Zambia) Zamsure FC
11	FW	Kalusha Bwalya	16 August 1963 (aged 32)		(Mexico) América
9	FW	Dennis Lota	8 November 1973 (aged 22)		(Zambia) Konkola Blades
18	FW	Mwape Miti	24 May 1973 (aged 22)		(Zambia) Power Dynamos FC
8	FW	Zeddy Saileti	16 January 1969 (aged 26)		(Finland) RoPS

=== Algeria ===
Head coach: (Algeria) Ali Fergani

No.	Pos.	Player	Date of birth (age)	Caps	Club
1	GK	Aomar Hamened	7 February 1969 (aged 26)		(Algeria) JS Kabylie
2	DF	Fayçal Hamdani	13 July 1970 (aged 25)		(Algeria) WA Boufarik
3	DF	Tarek Ghoul	6 January 1975 (aged 21)		(Algeria) USM El Harrach
4	DF	Rezki Amrouche	17 November 1970 (aged 25)		(Algeria) JS Kabylie
5	DF	Mourad Slatni	5 February 1966 (aged 29)		(Algeria) CR Belouizdad
6	DF	Mahieddine Meftah	25 September 1968 (aged 27)		(Algeria) JS Kabylie
7	FW	Kamel Kaci-Saïd	13 December 1967 (aged 28)		(Egypt) Zamalek SC
8	MF	Billel Dziri	21 January 1972 (aged 23)		(Algeria) USM Alger
9	FW	Ali Meçabih	2 April 1972 (aged 23)		(Algeria) MC Oran
10	MF	Khaled Lounici	9 July 1967 (aged 28)		(Algeria) USM El Harrach
11	FW	Nacer Zekri	3 August 1971 (aged 24)		(Algeria) USM Alger
12	MF	Karim Bakhti	13 October 1969 (aged 26)		(Algeria) CR Belouizdad
13	MF	Sid Ahmed Zerrouki	30 August 1970 (aged 25)		(Algeria) MC Oran
14	MF	Tahar Cherif El-Ouazzani (c)	10 July 1967 (aged 28)		(Algeria) MC Oran
15	MF	Ali Dahleb	25 August 1969 (aged 26)		(Algeria) WA Tlemcen
16	GK	M'hamed Haniched	30 April 1968 (aged 27)		(Algeria) US Chaouia
17	FW	Azzedine Rahim	31 March 1972 (aged 23)		(Algeria) USM Alger
18	MF	Moussa Saïb	5 March 1969 (aged 26)		(France) AJ Auxerre
19	MF	Abdelaziz Guechir	6 April 1968 (aged 27)		(Algeria) CA Batna
20	DF	Tarek Lazizi	8 June 1971 (aged 24)		(Algeria) MC Alger
21	DF	Omar Belatoui	4 September 1969 (aged 26)		(Algeria) MC Oran
22	GK	Reda Acimi	25 May 1969 (aged 26)		(Algeria) WA Tlemcen

=== Burkina Faso ===
Head coach: (Burkina Faso) Idrissa Traore, then (Burkina Faso) Calixte Zagre for the last match

No.	Pos.	Player	Date of birth (age)	Caps	Club
16	GK	Siaka Coulibaly	10 March 1972 (aged 23)		(Burkina Faso) USFA
1	GK	Ibrahima Diarra	16 February 1971 (aged 24)		(Morocco) FUS Rabat
5	DF	Brahima Cissé	5 October 1977 (aged 18)		(Burkina Faso) USFA
13	DF	Ousseni Diop	20 December 1970 (aged 25)		(Burkina Faso) ASFA Yennega
22	DF	Pierre Kouada	29 June 1966 (aged 29)		(Burkina Faso) Etoile Filante
6	DF	Camille Palenfo	6 September 1971 (aged 24)		(Burkina Faso) ASFA Yennega
3	DF	Firmin Sanou	21 April 1973 (aged 22)		(Burkina Faso) Etoile Filante
21	DF	Zakaria Zeba	20 September 1972 (aged 23)		(Burkina Faso) USFA
4	MF	Hassane Kamagate	6 May 1970 (aged 25)		(Burkina Faso) ASFA Yennega
8	MF	Mamadou Kone	6 March 1974 (aged 21)		(Burkina Faso) USFA
15	MF	Sidi Napon	29 August 1972 (aged 23)		(France) Entente Sportive Viry-Châtillon
7	MF	Aboubakari Ouattara	20 December 1970 (aged 25)		(Burkina Faso) ASFA Yennega
12	MF	Brahima Traoré	24 February 1974 (aged 21)		(France) FC Bressuire
18	MF	Vincent Ye	9 August 1966 (aged 29)		(France) FC Sète
14	MF	Boureima Zongo	16 March 1972 (aged 23)		(Burkina Faso) Racing Club de Bobo
10	FW	Aboubakari Ouédraogo	23 June 1970 (aged 25)		(Burkina Faso) ASFA Yennega
11	FW	Ousmane Sanou	11 March 1978 (aged 17)		(Netherlands) Willem II
20	FW	Salif Sanou	3 June 1974 (aged 21)		(Burkina Faso) ASF Bobo-Dioulasso
19	FW	Salifou Traoré	25 January 1973 (aged 22)		(Burkina Faso) USFA
2	FW	Seydou Traoré	17 September 1970 (aged 25)		(France) FC Bressuire
9	FW	Youssouf Traoré	11 May 1974 (aged 21)		(Algeria) USM Aïn Beïda

=== Sierra Leone ===
Head coach: (Sweden) Roger Palmgren

No.	Pos.	Player	Date of birth (age)	Caps	Club
16	GK	Brima Kamara	5 May 1972 (aged 23)		(Sierra Leone) East End Lions
1	GK	Osaid Marah	26 May 1960 (aged 35)		(Belgium) K.V.K. Tienen
14	DF	Ibrahim Bah	8 March 1969 (aged 26)		(Sierra Leone) Ports Authority F.C.
3	DF	Lamine Bangura	18 April 1972 (aged 23)		(Ivory Coast) ASEC Abidjan
5	DF	Kewullay Conteh	31 December 1977 (aged 18)		(Italy) Atalanta B.C.
12	DF	Gbessay Bangura	30 January 1974 (aged 21)		(Sweden) Spanga IS
4	DF	Abu Bakerr Kamara	15 April 1977 (aged 18)		(Egypt) Ismaily SC
17	DF	Francis Koroma	4 January 1975 (aged 21)		(Sierra Leone) Diamond Stars
13	DF	Ibrahim Bobson Kamara	22 September 1975 (aged 20)		(Sierra Leone) Mighty Blackpool
15	DF	Ibrahim Kamara	17 March 1981 (aged 14)		(Scotland) Motherwell F.C.
6	DF	John Sama	24 March 1972 (aged 23)		(Sweden) Visby IF
18	MF	Amidu Karim	10 July 1974 (aged 21)		(Egypt) Gomhoriat Shebin SC
8	MF	Ahmed Kanu	5 July 1968 (aged 27)		(Belgium) Eendracht Aalst
7	MF	Musa Kanu	4 March 1976 (aged 19)		(Belgium) K.S.C. Lokeren
11	MF	Rashid Wurie	27 December 1972 (aged 23)		(Belgium) K. Beerschot V.A.C.
15	MF	Ibrahim Koroma	4 July 1973 (aged 22)		
2	FW	Lamine Conteh	17 January 1976 (aged 19)		(Germany) SV Meppen
19	FW	Gbessay Sesay	11 May 1968 (aged 27)		(Portugal) Vitória Setúbal
10	FW	Mohamed Kallon	6 October 1979 (aged 16)		(Switzerland) FC Lugano
9	FW	Musa Kallon	8 April 1970 (aged 25)		(Romania) Sportul Studenţesc
21	FW	Abu Kanu	31 March 1972 (aged 23)		(Sweden) Spanga IS
20	FW	Mohamed Sillah	1 September 1975 (aged 20)		(Belgium) K.F.C. Lommel S.K.

== Group C ==
=== Gabon ===
Head coach: (Gabon) Alain da Costa

No.	Pos.	Player	Date of birth (age)	Caps	Club
16	GK	Claude Babe	17 January 1970 (aged 25)		(Gabon) FC 105 Libreville
22	GK	Jacques Dekousshoud	12 May 1964 (aged 31)		(Gabon) FC 105 Libreville
1	GK	Germain Mendome	21 August 1970 (aged 25)		(Gabon) Mbilinga FC
11	DF	François Amegasse	10 October 1965 (aged 30)		(Gabon) Mbilinga FC
17	DF	Serge Bayonne	31 October 1970 (aged 25)		(Gabon) FC 105 Libreville
14	DF	Francis Koumba	16 July 1970 (aged 25)		(Gabon) Mangasport
4	DF	Jean-Martin Mouloungui	30 November 1969 (aged 26)		(Gabon) Mbilinga FC
5	DF	Guy-Roger Nzeng	30 May 1970 (aged 25)		(Gabon) Petrosport
3	DF	Landry Poulangoye	9 March 1976 (aged 19)		(France) FC Mulhouse
8	MF	Pierre Aubameyang (c)	29 May 1965 (aged 30)		(Gabon) FC 105 Libreville
6	MF	Etienne Kassa-Ngoma	13 June 1962 (aged 33)		(Gabon) Mbilinga FC
7	MF	Jean-Daniel Ndong-Nze	24 January 1970 (aged 25)		(Gabon) FC 105 Libreville
19	MF	Serge Ngoma	29 January 1974 (aged 21)		(France) Blagnac FC
2	MF	Jonas Ogandaga	1 August 1975 (aged 20)		(Gabon) Mbilinga FC
13	MF	Valery Ondo	14 August 1967 (aged 28)		(Tunisia) Espérance
9	MF	Anicet Yala	9 August 1976 (aged 19)		(Gabon) Mangasport
21	FW	Aurelien Bekogo	27 December 1975 (aged 20)		(Gabon) Mangasport
12	FW	Brice Mackaya	23 July 1968 (aged 27)		(Hungary) Vasas Budapest
10	FW	Régis Manon	22 October 1965 (aged 30)		(Gabon) FC 105 Libreville
20	FW	Albin Nbonga Nze	6 September 1971 (aged 24)		(Gabon) FC 105 Libreville
15	FW	Guy Roger Nzamba	13 July 1970 (aged 25)		(Gabon) FC 105 Libreville
18	FW	Constant Tamboucha	3 May 1976 (aged 19)		(Gabon) FC 105 Libreville

=== Zaire ===
Head coach: (Turkey) Muhsin Ertuğral, then (Zaire) Médard Lusadusu Basilwa for the last two games

No.	Pos.	Player	Date of birth (age)	Caps	Club
16	GK	Nzamongini Babale	13 March 1975 (aged 20)		(Zaire) DC Motemba Pembe
1	GK	Mpangi Merikani	4 April 1967 (aged 28)		(South Africa) Real Rovers
17	GK	Bilolo Tambwe			(Zaire) AS Vita Club
4	DF	Ntumba Danga	27 July 1963 (aged 32)		(France) Stade Brestois 29
7	DF	Michel Mazingu-Dinzey	15 October 1972 (aged 23)		(Germany) FC St. Pauli
14	DF	Roger Hitoto	24 February 1969 (aged 26)		(France) Lille OSC
19	DF	Kabwe Kasongo	31 July 1970 (aged 25)		(Zaire) Lubumbashi Sport
2	DF	Epangala Lukose	20 April 1964 (aged 31)		(Zaire) AS Vita Club
3	DF	Ngamala Monka	5 June 1968 (aged 27)		(Zaire) DC Motemba Pembe
5	DF	Mutamba Kabongo	9 December 1970 (aged 25)		(Zaire) AS Bantous
6	MF	Nzelo Hervé Lembi	25 August 1975 (aged 20)		(Belgium) Club Brugge
21	MF	Ndiaye Kalenga	12 December 1967 (aged 28)		(Turkey) Ankaragücü
13	MF	Zola Kiniambi	26 June 1970 (aged 25)		(Zaire) AS Vita Club
18	MF	Emeka Mamale	21 August 1977 (aged 18)		(Zaire) DC Motemba Pembe
8	MF	Kabeya Mukanya	1 May 1968 (aged 27)		(Belgium) K.F.C. Lommelse S.K.
10	MF	N'Dinga Mbote Amily	11 September 1966 (aged 29)		(Portugal) Vitória Guimarães
15	FW	Yves Essende-Liombi	20 August 1968 (aged 27)		(Belgium) Olympic Charleroi
11	FW	Roger Menana Lukaku	6 June 1966 (aged 29)		(Belgium) Germinal Ekeren
22	FW	Banga Kasongo	26 June 1974 (aged 21)		(Zaire) AS Vita Club
9	FW	Andre Kona N'Gole	16 June 1970 (aged 25)		(Turkey) Gençlerbirliği S.K.
12	FW	Michel Ngonge	17 August 1967 (aged 28)		(Belgium) K.R.C. Harelbeke
20	FW	Bunene Ngaduane	30 July 1972 (aged 23)		(Turkey) Ankaragücü

=== Liberia ===
Head coach: (Liberia) Wilfred Lardner

No.	Pos.	Player	Date of birth (age)	Caps	Club
16	GK	Pewou Bestman	10 July 1975 (aged 20)		(Liberia) Invincible Eleven
1	GK	Anthony Tokpah	26 July 1977 (aged 18)		(Croatia) Hajduk Split
20	GK	Michael Wreh	4 May 1975 (aged 20)		(Liberia) Mighty Barolle
4	DF	Jenkins Cooper	15 April 1975 (aged 20)		(Liberia) Mighty Barolle
18	DF	Terrence Dixon	27 August 1975 (aged 20)		(Liberia) Deportivo Travederos
22	DF	Fallah Johnson	26 October 1976 (aged 19)		(Liberia) Mighty Barolle
12	DF	Simon Mattar			(Liberia) Invincible Eleven
17	DF	Zizi Roberts	19 July 1979 (aged 16)		(Liberia) Junior Professional FC
14	DF	Alexander Theo	11 February 1969 (aged 26)		(South Africa) Bloemfontein Celtic
5	DF	Henry Beetoe	15 April 1975 (aged 20)		
7	MF	Robert Clarke	4 September 1967 (aged 28)		(Germany) 1. FC Saarbrücken
21	MF	Arthur Farh	12 June 1972 (aged 23)		(Germany) Stuttgarter Kickers
19	MF	Alexander Freeman	3 January 1970 (aged 26)		(Malaysia) Kelantan FA
3	MF	Jonah Sarrweah	24 September 1975 (aged 20)		(Ivory Coast) Africa Sports
6	MF	Kelvin Sebwe	4 April 1972 (aged 23)		(France) Toulouse FC
10	FW	James Debbah	14 December 1976 (aged 19)		(France) OGC Nice
2	FW	Oliver Makor	9 October 1973 (aged 22)		(France) Grenoble Foot
8	FW	Joe Nagbe	2 September 1968 (aged 27)		(France) OGC Nice
11	FW	Mass Sarr Jr	6 February 1973 (aged 22)		(Croatia) Hajduk Split
13	FW	Jonathan Sogbie	1 January 1967 (aged 29)		(Switzerland) Servette FC
9	FW	George Weah	1 October 1966 (aged 29)		(Italy) AC Milan
15	FW	Christopher Wreh	14 May 1975 (aged 20)		(France) AS Monaco

== Group D ==
=== Ghana ===
Head coach: (Brazil) Ismael Kurtz

No.	Pos.	Player	Date of birth (age)	Caps	Club
16	GK	Simon Addo	11 December 1974 (aged 21)		(Ghana) Ghapoha
22	GK	Richard Kingson	13 June 1978 (aged 17)		(Ghana) Great Olympics
1	GK	Crenstil Nanbanyin	9 April 1971 (aged 24)		(Ghana) Ashanti Gold SC
5	DF	Joseph Addo	21 September 1971 (aged 24)		(Germany) FSV Frankfurt
2	DF	Frank Amankwah	29 December 1971 (aged 24)		(Ghana) Asante Kotoko
3	DF	Isaac Asare	1 September 1974 (aged 21)		(Belgium) R.S.C. Anderlecht
12	DF	Stephen Baidoo	25 February 1976 (aged 19)		(Ghana) Ashanti Gold SC
4	DF	Afo Dodoo	23 November 1973 (aged 22)		(Greece) Kalamata
15	DF	Samuel Johnson	25 July 1973 (aged 22)		(Greece) Kalamata
14	DF	Samuel Kuffour	3 September 1976 (aged 19)		(Germany) FC Bayern Munich
8	MF	Joachin Yaw Acheampong	2 November 1973 (aged 22)		(Spain) Real Sociedad
19	MF	Daniel Addo	6 November 1976 (aged 19)		(Germany) Bayer Leverkusen
18	MF	Samuel Kumah	26 June 1970 (aged 25)		(Saudi Arabia) Al-Shabab
13	MF	Nii Lamptey	10 December 1974 (aged 21)		(England) Coventry City
10	MF	Abedi Pelé	5 November 1964 (aged 31)		(Italy) Torino Calcio
6	MF	Mallam Yahaya	31 December 1974 (aged 21)		(Germany) Borussia Dortmund
17	FW	Felix Aboagye	5 December 1975 (aged 20)		(Egypt) Al Ahly
11	FW	Charles Akonnor	12 March 1974 (aged 21)		(Germany) Fortuna Köln
20	FW	Kwame Ayew	28 December 1973 (aged 22)		(Portugal) Uniao Leiria
7	FW	Yaw Preko	8 September 1974 (aged 21)		(Belgium) R.S.C. Anderlecht
9	FW	Ibrahim Tanko	25 July 1977 (aged 18)		(Germany) Borussia Dortmund
21	FW	Tony Yeboah	6 June 1966 (aged 29)		(England) Leeds United

=== Ivory Coast ===
Head coach: (France) Pierre Pleimelding

No.	Pos.	Player	Date of birth (age)	Caps	Club
22	GK	Alain Gouaméné	15 June 1966 (aged 29)		(France) Toulouse FC
16	GK	Seydou Diarra	16 April 1968 (aged 27)		(Ivory Coast) ASEC Abidjan
1	GK	Obou Macaire	28 December 1970 (aged 25)		(Ivory Coast) Stella Club d'Adjamé
2	DF	Basile Aka Kouamé	6 April 1963 (aged 32)		(Ivory Coast) ASEC Abidjan
15	DF	Ghislain Akassou	15 February 1975 (aged 20)		(Ivory Coast) ASEC Abidjan
21	DF	Lassina Dao	6 February 1971 (aged 24)		(Ivory Coast) ASEC Abidjan
4	DF	Cyril Domoraud	22 July 1971 (aged 24)		(France) Red Star 93
6	DF	Kpassagnon Gneto	25 February 1971 (aged 24)		(Ivory Coast) Africa Sports
5	DF	Brahima Kamara	17 March 1966 (aged 29)		(Ivory Coast) Stade Abidjan
12	DF	Jean-Marie Kouassi	3 March 1975 (aged 20)		(Ivory Coast) ASEC Abidjan
3	DF	Rufin Biagne Lue	5 January 1968 (aged 28)		(Ivory Coast) Africa Sports
17	MF	Adama Kone	26 July 1969 (aged 26)		(Ivory Coast) Africa Sports
18	MF	Serge Dié	4 October 1977 (aged 18)		(Ivory Coast) Africa Sports
7	MF	Tchiressoua Guel	27 December 1975 (aged 20)		(Ivory Coast) ASEC Abidjan
8	MF	Ibrahima Kone	26 July 1969 (aged 26)		(Ivory Coast) Africa Sports
13	MF	Aliou Siby Badra	26 February 1971 (aged 24)		(Ivory Coast) ASEC Abidjan
19	MF	Donald-Olivier Sie	3 April 1970 (aged 25)		(Ivory Coast) ASEC Abidjan
9	FW	Ibrahima Bakayoko	31 December 1976 (aged 19)		(France) Montpellier HSC
11	FW	Michel Bassole	18 July 1972 (aged 23)		(Saudi Arabia) Al-Ittifaq
20	FW	Joël Tiéhi	12 June 1964 (aged 31)		(France) FC Martigues
10	FW	Abdoulaye Traoré	4 March 1967 (aged 28)		(Ivory Coast) ASEC Abidjan
14	FW	Moussa Traoré	25 December 1971 (aged 24)		(France) Olympique Alès

=== Tunisia ===
Head coach: (Poland) Henryk Kasperczak

No.	Pos.	Player	Date of birth (age)	Caps	Club
22	GK	Hassen Bejaoui	14 February 1975 (aged 20)		(Tunisia) CA Bizerte
1	GK	Chokri El Ouaer	15 August 1966 (aged 29)		(Tunisia) Espérance
16	GK	Boubaker Zitouni	16 November 1965 (aged 30)		(Tunisia) Club Africain
15	DF	Khaled Badra	8 April 1973 (aged 22)		(Tunisia) Espérance
5	DF	Hédi Ben Rekhissa	28 June 1972 (aged 23)		(Tunisia) Espérance
4	DF	Mounir Boukadida	24 October 1967 (aged 28)		(Tunisia) Étoile Sahel
21	DF	Lassad Hanini	2 May 1971 (aged 24)		(Tunisia) Club Africain
14	DF	Sabri Jaballah	28 June 1973 (aged 22)		(Tunisia) AS Marsa
13	DF	Bechir Sahbani	22 October 1972 (aged 23)		(Tunisia) CA Bizerte
17	DF	Ahmed Trabelsi	27 July 1973 (aged 22)		(Tunisia) Club Africain
8	MF	Zoubeir Baya	15 May 1971 (aged 24)		(Tunisia) Étoile Sahel
20	MF	Riadh Bouazizi	8 April 1973 (aged 22)		(Tunisia) Étoile Sahel
6	MF	Ferid Chouchane	19 April 1973 (aged 22)		(Tunisia) Étoile Sahel
12	MF	Sofiane Fekhi	9 August 1968 (aged 27)		(Tunisia) CS Sfaxien
10	MF	Kais Ghodhbane	7 January 1976 (aged 20)		(Tunisia) Étoile Sahel
11	MF	Adel Sellimi	16 November 1972 (aged 23)		(Tunisia) Club Africain
3	MF	Sami Trabelsi	4 February 1968 (aged 27)		(Tunisia) CS Sfaxien
19	FW	Belhassen Aloui	17 March 1973 (aged 22)		(Tunisia) CS Hammam-Lif
9	FW	Abdelkader Ben Hassen	24 September 1969 (aged 26)		(Tunisia) Espérance
18	FW	Mehdi Ben Slimane	1 January 1974 (aged 22)		(Tunisia) AS Marsa
2	FW	Imed Ben Younes	16 June 1974 (aged 21)		(Tunisia) Étoile Sahel
7	FW	Jameleddine Limam	11 June 1967 (aged 28)		(Tunisia) Stade Tunisien

=== Mozambique ===
Head coach: (Portugal) Rui Caçador

No.	Pos.	Player	Date of birth (age)	Caps	Club
22	GK	Luisinho	14 April 1973 (aged 22)		(Mozambique) Desportivo Maputo
1	GK	Manuel Valoi	6 August 1968 (aged 27)		(Mozambique) Maxaquene
12	GK	Rui Evora	11 August 1970 (aged 25)		(Mozambique) Costa do Sol
20	DF	João Chissano	26 July 1970 (aged 25)		(Mozambique) Costa do Sol
17	DF	Luis Parruque	28 July 1969 (aged 26)		(Mozambique) Desportivo Maputo
14	DF	Pinto Barros	4 May 1973 (aged 22)		(Mozambique) Ferroviário Maputo
2	DF	Sérgio Faife	26 April 1970 (aged 25)		(Mozambique) Costa do Sol
5	DF	Tomás Inguana	13 January 1973 (aged 23)		(Mozambique) Desportivo Maputo
3	DF	Zé Augusto	18 April 1968 (aged 27)		(Mozambique) Costa do Sol
8	MF	Ali Hassan	4 June 1964 (aged 31)		(Portugal) Torres Novas
6	MF	Antonio Muchanga	24 November 1965 (aged 30)		(Mozambique) Maxaquene
11	MF	Danito	20 March 1970 (aged 25)		(Mozambique) Ferroviário Maputo
9	MF	Nana	11 September 1967 (aged 28)		(Mozambique) Costa do Sol
21	MF	Riquito	1 April 1966 (aged 29)		(Mozambique) Costa do Sol
18	MF	Tico-Tico	16 August 1973 (aged 22)		(Mozambique) Desportivo Maputo
13	MF	Mavó	4 October 1971 (aged 24)		(Mozambique) Ferroviário Beira
16	MF	Zé Bernardo	28 December 1971 (aged 24)		(Mozambique) Desportivo Maputo
19	FW	Arnaldo Ouana	22 December 1969 (aged 26)		(Mozambique) Costa do Sol
4	FW	Cachela Boane	28 December 1972 (aged 23)		(Mozambique) Maxaquene
10	FW	Chiquinho Conde	22 November 1965 (aged 30)		(Portugal) Belenenses
7	FW	Jojó	6 September 1970 (aged 25)		(Portugal) Penafiel
