= 2000 African Cup of Nations qualification =

Football tournament

This page details the process of qualifying for the 2000 African Cup of Nations.

== Preliminary round ==
| Team 1 | Agg. | Team 2 | 1st leg | 2nd leg |
|---|---|---|---|---|
| Libya | 1–6 | Algeria | 1–3 | 0–3 |
| Benin | 2–3 | Angola | 2–1 | 0–2 |
| Mali | 3–0 | Cape Verde | 3–0 | 0–0 |
| Chad | 1–1 (a) | Congo | 1–1 | 0–0 |
| Equatorial Guinea | 0–5 | Gabon | 0–2 | 0–3 |
| Djibouti | 1–12 | Kenya | 0–3 | 1–9 |
| Niger | 2–3 | Liberia | 2–1 | 0–2 |
| Swaziland | 2–3 | Madagascar | 1–2 | 1–1 |
| Lesotho | 2–4 | Mauritius | 1–1 | 1–3 |
| Botswana | 1–2 | Mozambique | 0–0 | 1–2 |
| Namibia | 3–1 | Malawi | 2–1 | 1–0 |
| Burundi | 2–0 | Tanzania | 1–0 | 1–0 |
| São Tomé and Príncipe | 0–6 | Togo | 0–4 | 0–2 |
| Uganda | 5–0 | Rwanda | 5–0 | 0–0 |
| Senegal | w/o | Gambia | — | — |
| Sierra Leone | w/o | Mauritania | — | — |
| Eritrea | w/o | Ethiopia | — | — |

31 July 1998

| Libya | 1–3 | Algeria |
|---|---|---|
| Al-Tawerghi 84' | Report | Tasfaout 56', 75'; Adjali 82' |

June 11 Stadium, Tripoli
Attendance: 40,000
Referee: Mourad Daami (Tunisia)
14 August 1998

| Algeria | 3–0 | Libya |
|---|---|---|
| Adjali 9'; Boukessassa 57'; Tasfaout 65' | Report |

19 May Stadium, Annaba
Attendance: 35,000
Referee: Abderrahim El Arjoun (Morocco)

2 August 1998

| Benin | 2–1 | Angola |
|---|---|---|
| Tchomogo 6', 32' | | Chicangala 36' |

Stade de l'Amitié, Cotonou
Attendance: 8,000
Referee: Ibrahim Djingarey Amadou (Niger)
16 August 1998

| Angola | 2–0 | Benin |
|---|---|---|
| Akwá |

Estádio da Cidadela, Luanda
Attendance: 16,000
Referee: Bisingu Buenkadila (DR Congo)

2 August 1998

| Mali | 3–0 | Cape Verde |
|---|---|---|
| Yaya Dissa; Harouna Diarra; Brahima Traoré |

Stade Modibo Kéïta, Bamako
Attendance: 15,000
Referee: Idrissa Seck (Senegal)
16 August 1998

| Cape Verde | 0–0 | Mali |

Estádio da Várzea, Praia
Attendance: 6,000

2 August 1998

| Chad | 1–1 | Congo |
|---|---|---|
| Abana | | Tsoumou |

Stade Omnisports, N'Djaména
Attendance: 6,500
16 August 1998

| Congo | 0–0 | Chad |

Stade Municipal, Pointe Noire
Attendance: 5,000
Referee: Baba Touré (Togo)

2 August 1998

| Equatorial Guinea | 0–2 | Gabon |
|---|---|---|
| | | Bounguedza 60'; Nguema 65' |

Estádio Patrice Lumumba, Bata
Attendance: 11,000
16 August 1998

| Gabon | 3–0 | Equatorial Guinea |
|---|---|---|
| Ogouérowo 34'; Londo 52'; Nguema 89' |

Stade Omnisports, Libreville
Attendance: 6,000

31 July 1998

| Djibouti | 0–3 | Kenya |
|---|---|---|
| | | Sunguti 4', 20'; Ongao 70' |

Moi International Sports Centre, Nairobi
Attendance: 15,000
15 August 1998

| Kenya | 9–1 | Djibouti |
|---|---|---|
| Okoth 3', 6', 67'; Sunguti 19', 26'; Oduor 30', 85'; Ambani 75', 83' | | Dirieh Hamed 25' |

Moi International Sports Centre, Nairobi
Attendance: 12,000

Note: both games were played in Kenya.

2 August 1998

| Niger | 2–1 | Liberia |
|---|---|---|
| Idé Barkiré 5' (pen.); Yattaga 44' | | Sarr 87' |

Stade Général-Seyni-Kountché, Niamey
Attendance: 4,000
16 August 1998

| Liberia | 2–0 | Niger |
|---|---|---|
| Wreh 30'; Roberts 45' |

Samuel Kanyon Doe Sports Complex, Monrovia
Attendance: 10,000

2 August 1998

| Swaziland | 1–2 | Madagascar |
|---|---|---|
| M. Dlamini 28' | | Rasoanaivo 22'; Mosa 65' |

Somholo National Stadium, Lobamba
Attendance: 1,000
23 August 1998

| Madagascar | 1–1 | Swaziland |
|---|---|---|
| Menakely 15' | | S. Dlamini 49' |

Mahamasina Municipal Stadium, Antananarivo
Attendance: 30,000

2 August 1998

| Lesotho | 1–1 | Mauritius |
|---|---|---|
| Seema 30' (pen.) | | Cundasamy 3' |

Setsoto Stadium, Maseru
Attendance: 9,000
23 August 1998

| Mauritius | 3–1 | Lesotho |
|---|---|---|
| Cundasamy 34'; Perlé 65'; Ithier 90' | | Mohapi |

Stade George V, Curepipe
Attendance: 25,200

2 August 1998

| Botswana | 0–0 | Mozambique |

National Stadium, Gaborone
Attendance: 6,000
15 August 1998

| Mozambique | 2–1 | Botswana |
|---|---|---|
| Dário | | Duiker |

Estádio da Machava, Maputo
Attendance: 25,000

1 August 1998

| Namibia | 2–1 | Malawi |
|---|---|---|
| Samaria 9'; Nauseb 60' | | Nakhumwa 22' |

National Stadium, Windhoek
Attendance: 5,000
15 August 1998

| Malawi | 0–1 | Namibia |
|---|---|---|
| | | Nauseb 15' |

Chichiri Stadium, Blantyre
Attendance: 8,000

2 August 1998

| Burundi | 1–0 | Tanzania |
|---|---|---|
| Mbuyi 55' |

Prince Louis Rwagasore Stadium, Bujumbura
Attendance: 5,000
Referee: Wa Ntambidila (DR Congo)
15 August 1998

| Tanzania | 0–1 | Burundi |
|---|---|---|
| | | Daoudi 88' |

Benjamin Mkapa National Stadium, Dar es Salaam
Attendance: 7,000

2 August 1998

| São Tomé and Príncipe | 0–4 | Togo |
|---|---|---|
| | | Noutsoudje 9' (pen.), 19'; Goumai; Yedibahoma 77' |

Stade Omar Bongo, Libreville, Gabon
(neutral ground)
Attendance: 3,000
18 August 1998

| Togo | 2–0 | São Tomé and Príncipe |
|---|---|---|
| Noutsoudje 4'; Adjamgba 71' |

Stade Municipal, Lomé
Attendance: 4,000

1 August 1998

| Uganda | 5–0 | Rwanda |
|---|---|---|
| Musisi 1', 43', 47'; Obwinyi 42'; Mutyaba 83' |

Nakivubo Stadium, Kampala
Attendance: 18,000
16 August 1998

| Rwanda | 0–0 | Uganda |

Stade Amahoro, Kigali
Attendance: 15,000

| Senegal | w/o | Gambia |

Gambia withdrew, Senegal advanced automatically.

| Sierra Leone | w/o | Mauritania |

Mauritania withdrew, Sierra Leone advanced automatically.

23 August 1998

| Eritrea | w/o | Ethiopia |

Cairo, Egypt

Ethiopia withdrew due to Eritrean–Ethiopian War, Eritrea advanced automatically.

== Group round ==
Group round took place between 2 October 1998 and 20 June 1999.

=== Group 1 ===
Ghana qualified as hosts as of 15 March 1999; their results where annulled. Eritrea qualified for the playoff.

| Team | Pld | W | D | L | GF | GA | GD | Pts |
|---|---|---|---|---|---|---|---|---|
| Cameroon | 4 | 3 | 1 | 0 | 8 | 1 | +7 | 10 |
| Eritrea | 4 | 1 | 1 | 2 | 2 | 4 | −2 | 4 |
| Mozambique | 4 | 1 | 0 | 3 | 4 | 9 | −5 | 3 |
| Ghana (H) | 0 | 0 | 0 | 0 | 0 | 0 | 0 | 0 |

(H) Awarded hosting rights
4 October 1998

| Mozambique | 3–1 | Eritrea |
|---|---|---|
| Dário 30'; Tomás 35'; Tico-Tico 44' | | Zerom 44' |

Estádio da Machava, Maputo
Attendance: 25,000
Referee: Felix Tangawarima (Zimbabwe)
4 October 1998

| Cameroon | 1–3 Annulled | Ghana |
|---|---|---|
| Olembé 35' | | Akonnor 12'; Johnson 35'; Nyarko 89' |

Stade de la Réunification, Douala
Attendance: 40,000

23 January 1999

| Eritrea | 0–0 | Cameroon |

Asmara Stadium, Asmara
Attendance: 5,000
Referee: Ahmed El-Shinawi (Egypt)
24 January 1999

| Ghana | 1–0 Annulled | Mozambique |
|---|---|---|
| Akonnor 54' |

Accra Sports Stadium, Accra
Attendance: 30,000

28 February 1999

| Cameroon | 1–0 | Mozambique |
|---|---|---|
| M'Boma 25' |

Ahmadou Ahidjo Stadium, Yaoundé
Attendance: 55,000
Referee: Coffi Codjia (Benin)
28 February 1999

| Ghana | 5–0 Annulled | Eritrea |
|---|---|---|
| Ahinful 5'; Preko 27', 56', 84'; Ofori-Quaye 68' |

Accra Sports Stadium, Accra
Attendance: 50,000

11 April 1999

| Mozambique | 1–6 | Cameroon |
|---|---|---|
| Tico-Tico 60' | | Job 26', 28'; M'Boma 33', 42'; Njanka 74'; Suffo 83' |

Estádio da Machava, Maputo
Attendance: 18,000
Referee: Edwin Senai (Botswana)

6 June 1999

| Cameroon | 1–0 | Eritrea |
|---|---|---|
| Song |

Ahmadou Ahidjo Stadium, Yaoundé
Referee: Haroun Boukar (Chad)

19 June 1999

| Eritrea | 1–0 | Mozambique |
|---|---|---|
| Fishaye 81' |

Asmara Stadium, Asmara
Attendance: 5,000

=== Group 2 ===
Sierra Leone withdrew due to the Sierra Leone Civil War on 22 March 1999, their result was annulled.

| Team | Pld | W | D | L | GF | GA | GD | Pts |
|---|---|---|---|---|---|---|---|---|
| Morocco | 4 | 2 | 2 | 0 | 6 | 4 | +2 | 8 |
| Togo | 4 | 1 | 1 | 2 | 6 | 6 | 0 | 4 |
| Guinea | 4 | 1 | 1 | 2 | 3 | 5 | −2 | 4 |
| Sierra Leone (W) | 0 | 0 | 0 | 0 | 0 | 0 | 0 | 0 |

(W) Withdrew
4 October 1998

| Togo | 2–0 | Guinea |
|---|---|---|
| T. Salou 5' (pen.); Ouadja 58' |

Stade Municipal, Lomé
Attendance: 15,000
Referee: Coffi Codjia (Benin)
4 October 1998

| Morocco | 3–0 Annulled | Sierra Leone |
|---|---|---|
| Chippo 22'; Bassir 42'; Camacho 82' |

Mohamed V Stadium, Casablanca
Attendance: 25,000
Referee: Djibril M'Baye (Senegal)

24 January 1999

| Guinea | 1–1 | Morocco |
|---|---|---|
| Oularé 30' | | Hadji 46' |

Stade du 28 Septembre, Conakry
Attendance: 18,000
Referee: Zeli Sinko (Ivory Coast)

28 February 1999

| Togo | 2–3 | Morocco |
|---|---|---|
| Noutsoudje 32'; Goumai 63' | | Camacho 2', 72'; Hadji 39' |

Stade Municipal, Lomé
Attendance: 15,000
Referee: Alex Quartey (Ghana)

11 April 1999

| Morocco | 1–1 | Togo |
|---|---|---|
| Chippo 40' | | Oyawolé 67' |

Mohamed V Stadium, Casablanca
Attendance: 50,000
Referee: Mohsen Boukhir (Tunisia)

6 June 1999

| Morocco | 1–0 | Guinea |
|---|---|---|
| Camacho 6' |

Moulay Abdellah Stadium, Rabat
Attendance: 70,000
Referee: Lazzoun Boucif (Algeria)

20 Jun 1999

| Guinea | 2–1 | Togo |
|---|---|---|
| F. Camara 53', 64' | | Kader 61' |

Stade Saifoullaye Diallo, Labé
Attendance: 28,000
Referee: Malick Sillah (Gambia)

=== Group 3 ===
| Team | Pld | W | D | L | GF | GA | GD | Pts |
|---|---|---|---|---|---|---|---|---|
| Ivory Coast | 6 | 3 | 2 | 1 | 7 | 2 | +5 | 11 |
| Congo | 6 | 3 | 1 | 2 | 6 | 5 | +1 | 10 |
| Mali | 6 | 2 | 3 | 1 | 5 | 3 | +2 | 9 |
| Namibia | 6 | 0 | 2 | 4 | 2 | 10 | −8 | 2 |

3 October 1998

| Namibia | 0–1 | Congo |
|---|---|---|
| | | Mokossi 80' |

National Stadium, Windhoek
Attendance: 10,000
Referee: Edwin Senai (Botswana)
4 October 1998

| Mali | 0–1 | Ivory Coast |
|---|---|---|
| | | Koné 87' |

Stade Modibo Kéïta, Bamako
Attendance: 15,000
Referee: Lucien Bouchardeau (Niger)

24 January 1999

| Ivory Coast | 3–0 | Namibia |
|---|---|---|
| Diallo 10', 90'; Diomandé 32' |

Stade Félix Houphouët-Boigny, Abidjan
Attendance: 15,000
Referee: Sillah Malick (Gambia)
24 January 1999

| Congo | 0–0 | Mali |

Stade Municipal, Pointe Noire
Referee: Felix Tangawarima (Zimbabwe)

28 February 1999

| Congo | 1–0 | Ivory Coast |
|---|---|---|
| Ntounou 10' |

Stade Municipal, Pointe Noire
Attendance: 12,000
Referee: Gilbert Njike (Cameroon)

11 April 1999

| Mali | 2–1 | Namibia |

Stade Modibo Kéïta, Bamako
Attendance: 20,000
Referee: Seydou Ba (Mauritania)
11 April 1999

| Ivory Coast | 2–0 | Congo |
|---|---|---|
| Bakayoko 20'; Tiéhi 25' |

Stade Félix Houphouët-Boigny, Abidjan
Attendance: 40,000
Referee: Manuel Monteiro Duarte (Cape Verde)

8 May 1999

| Namibia | 0–0 | Mali |

National Stadium, Windhoek
Attendance: 10,000
Referee: Eusebio Alfredo (Mozambique)

5 June 1999

| Namibia | 1–1 | Ivory Coast |
|---|---|---|
| Jacobs 56' | | Diallo 78' |

National Stadium, Windhoek
Attendance: 10,000
Referee: Antônio da Silva (Angola)
6 June 1999

| Mali | 3–1 | Congo |

Stade Modibo Kéïta, Bamako
Referee: Pierre Mouguengui (Gabon)

20 June 1999

| Ivory Coast | 0–0 | Mali |

Stade Félix Houphouët-Boigny, Abidjan
Attendance: 45,000
Referee: Karim Daho (Algeria)
20 June 1999

| Congo | 3–0 | Namibia |
|---|---|---|
| Bokatola 24'; Buitys 53'; Guié-Mien 87' |

Stade Municipal, Pointe Noire
Referee: Olaniyan Olufemi (Nigeria)

=== Group 4 ===
| Team | Pld | W | D | L | GF | GA | GD | Pts |
|---|---|---|---|---|---|---|---|---|
| South Africa | 6 | 3 | 2 | 1 | 10 | 5 | +5 | 11 |
| Gabon | 6 | 3 | 1 | 2 | 10 | 10 | 0 | 10 |
| Mauritius | 6 | 1 | 3 | 2 | 6 | 8 | −2 | 6 |
| Angola | 6 | 1 | 2 | 3 | 7 | 10 | −3 | 5 |

3 October 1998

| South Africa | 1–0 | Angola |
|---|---|---|
| Bartlett 86' |

First National Bank Stadium, Johannesburg
Attendance: 25,000
Referee: Homary Mohamady (Madagascar)
4 October 1998

| Gabon | 2–0 | Mauritius |
|---|---|---|
| Londo 17'; Ogandaga 85' |

Stade Omar Bongo, Libreville
Attendance: 6,000
Referee: Souleymane Konaté (Cameroon)

23 January 1999

| Mauritius | 1–1 | South Africa |
|---|---|---|
| Périatambée 56' | | Masinga 44' |

Stade George V, Curepipe
Attendance: 32,385
Referee: Richard Phiri (Zambia)
24 January 1999

| Angola | 3–1 | Gabon |
|---|---|---|
| Akwá 7', 51', 90' | | Mouloungui 34' |

Estádio da Cidadela, Luanda
Attendance: 15,000
Referee: Abdulkadir Isaack Omar (Tanzania)

27 February 1999

| South Africa | 4–1 | Gabon |
|---|---|---|
| Moeti 45'; Masinga 50'; Bartlett 57'; McCarthy 80' | | Nguema 27' |

Odi Stadium, Mabopane
Attendance: 50,000
Referee: Hailemalik Tessema (Ethiopia)
28 February 1999

| Angola | 0–2 | Mauritius |
|---|---|---|
| | | Perle 29'; Bax 84' |

Estádio da Cidadela, Luanda
Attendance: 25,000

10 April 1999

| Gabon | 1–0 | South Africa |
|---|---|---|
| Londo 90+3' (pen.) |

Stade Omar Bongo, Libreville
Attendance: 18,000
Referee: Joseph Mandzioukouta (Congo)
10 April 1999

| Mauritius | 1–1 | Angola |
|---|---|---|
| Perle 31' | | Bodunha 16' |

Stade George V, Curepipe
Attendance: 31,979
Referee: Roger Raharison (Madagascar)

5 June 1999

| South Africa | 2–0 | Mauritius |
|---|---|---|
| Mngomeni 57'; McCarthy 80' |

Kings Park Stadium, Durban
Attendance: 45,000
Referee: Wilfred Mukuna (Zimbabwe)
6 June 1999

| Gabon | 3–1 | Angola |
|---|---|---|
| Nguema 17', 40'; Amégasse 80' | | Valente 81' |

Stade Omar Bongo, Libreville
Referee: Ibrahim Djingarey (Niger)

20 June 1999

| Angola | 2–2 | South Africa |
|---|---|---|
| Zito 70'; Jaburú 74' | | Mkhalele 32'; Mudau 48' |

Estádio da Cidadela, Luanda
Attendance: 25,000
Referee: Said Belqola (Morocco)
20 June 1999

| Mauritius | 2–2 | Gabon |
|---|---|---|
| François 45'; Perle 73' | | Nzaboutamba 37'; Nguema 72' |

Stade George V, Curepipe
Attendance: 31,800
Referee: Alfredo Eusébio (Mozambique)

=== Group 5 ===
Nigeria qualified as hosts as of 15 March 1999; their results were annulled. Senegal qualified for the playoff.

| Team | Pld | W | D | L | GF | GA | GD | Pts |
|---|---|---|---|---|---|---|---|---|
| Burkina Faso | 4 | 2 | 2 | 0 | 8 | 5 | +3 | 8 |
| Senegal | 4 | 1 | 2 | 1 | 4 | 4 | 0 | 5 |
| Burundi | 4 | 1 | 0 | 3 | 3 | 6 | −3 | 3 |
| Nigeria (H) | 0 | 0 | 0 | 0 | 0 | 0 | 0 | 0 |

(H) Awarded hosting rights
4 October 1998

| Burkina Faso | 0–0 Annulled | Nigeria |

Stade du 4 Août, Ouagadougou
Attendance: 30,000
13 December 1998

| Burundi | 1–0 | Senegal |
|---|---|---|
| Sutche 18' |

Prince Louis Rwagasore Stadium, Bujumbura

23 January 1999

| Senegal | 1–1 | Burkina Faso |
|---|---|---|
| Keita 31' | | Nana 54' |

Stade Léopold Sédar Senghor, Dakar
Attendance: 40,000
Referee: Mamadouba Camara (Guinea)
23 January 1999

| Nigeria | 2–0 Annulled | Burundi |
|---|---|---|
| Lawal 38'; Finidi 70' |

MKO Abiola Stadium, Abeokuta
Attendance: 30,000

28 February 1999

| Burundi | 1–2 | Burkina Faso |
|---|---|---|
| Kitenge 24' (pen.) | | M. Zongo; Kambou 60' |

Prince Louis Rwagasore Stadium, Bujumbura
Attendance: 8,000
Referee: Waiswa Ajab (Uganda)
28 February 1999

| Senegal | 1–1 Annulled | Nigeria |
|---|---|---|
| Keita 69' | | Akpoborie 75' |

Stade Léopold Sédar Senghor, Dakar
Attendance: 55,000

11 April 1999

| Burkina Faso | 3–1 | Burundi |
|---|---|---|
| B. Zongo 3', 15'; M. Zongo 6' (pen.) | | Mossi 29' |

Stade du 4 Août, Ouagadougou
Attendance: 25,000
Referee: Baba Touré (Togo)

6 June 1999

| Burkina Faso | 2–2 | Senegal |
|---|---|---|
| Ouédraogo 45'; Koné 80' | | Henri Camara 20'; Diop 59' |

Stade du 4 Août, Ouagadougou
Attendance: 25,000
Referee: Mourad Daami (Tunisia)

19 June 1999

| Senegal | 1–0 | Burundi |
|---|---|---|
| Keita 10' |

Stade Léopold Sédar Senghor, Dakar
Attendance: 20,000
Referee: Emmanuel Okoampah (Ghana)

=== Group 6 ===
| Team | Pld | W | D | L | GF | GA | GD | Pts |
|---|---|---|---|---|---|---|---|---|
| Zambia | 6 | 5 | 1 | 0 | 9 | 2 | +7 | 16 |
| DR Congo | 6 | 3 | 1 | 2 | 7 | 6 | +1 | 10 |
| Madagascar | 6 | 1 | 2 | 3 | 6 | 10 | −4 | 5 |
| Kenya | 6 | 0 | 2 | 4 | 3 | 7 | −4 | 2 |

3 October 1998

| Kenya | 1–1 | Madagascar |
|---|---|---|
| Otieno 11' (pen.) | | Menakely 64' |

Moi International Sports Centre, Nairobi
Attendance: 12,000
4 October 1998

| Zambia | 1–1 | DR Congo |
|---|---|---|
| Kilambe 46' | | Simba 44' |

Independence Stadium, Lusaka
Referee: Peter Lauer (Swaziland)

24 January 1999

| Madagascar | 1–2 | Zambia |
|---|---|---|
| Rasoanaivo 65' | | Kilambe 85'; Milanzi 87' |

Mahamasina Municipal Stadium, Antananarivo
Attendance: 4,000
Referee: Petros Mathabela (South Africa)
24 January 1999

| DR Congo | 2–1 | Kenya |
|---|---|---|
| Kanyengele 15', 65' | | Origi 66' |

Stade des Martyrs, Kinshasa
Attendance: 75,000
Referee: Pierre Mounguengui (Gabon)

28 February 1999

| Kenya | 0–1 | Zambia |
|---|---|---|
| | | Lota 9' |

Moi International Sports Centre, Nairobi
Attendance: 30,000
Referee: Sohan Pradeep Kumar (Mauritius)
28 February 1999

| Madagascar | 3–1 | DR Congo |
|---|---|---|
| Menakely 42'; Rasoanaivo 64', 74' | | Bakasu 81' |

Mahamasina Municipal Stadium, Antananarivo
Attendance: 35,000
Referee: Wilfred Mukuna (Zimbabwe)

10 April 1999

| Zambia | 1–0 | Kenya |
|---|---|---|
| Kamwandi 40' |

Independence Stadium, Lusaka
Attendance: 40,000
Referee: Robin Williams (South Africa)
11 April 1999

| DR Congo | 2–0 | Madagascar |
|---|---|---|
| Kimoto 7'; Lokose 46' |

Stade des Martyrs, Kinshasa
Attendance: 75,000
Referee: Boukar Haroun (Chad)

6 June 1999

| Kenya | 0–1 | DR Congo |
|---|---|---|
| | | Akwana 20' (o.g.) |

Moi International Sports Centre, Nairobi
Attendance: 20,000
Referee: Ahmed Saleh (Sudan)
6 June 1999

| Zambia | 3–0 | Madagascar |
|---|---|---|
| Banda 1', 22'; Lota 85' |

Konkola Stadium, Chililabombwe
Attendance: 4,500
Referee: Ahmed El-Shenawi (Egypt)

20 June 1999

| DR Congo | 0–1 | Zambia |
|---|---|---|
| | | Sinkala 46' (pen.) |

Stade des Martyrs, Kinshasa
Attendance: 40,000
Referee: Coffi Codjia (Benin)
20 June 1999

| Madagascar | 1–1 | Kenya |
|---|---|---|
| Rasoanaivo 44' (pen.) | | Serengo 39' |

Mahamasina Municipal Stadium, Antananarivo
Referee: Hailemalak Tessema (Ethiopia)

=== Group 7 ===
| Team | Pld | W | D | L | GF | GA | GD | Pts |
|---|---|---|---|---|---|---|---|---|
| Tunisia | 6 | 5 | 0 | 1 | 13 | 3 | +10 | 15 |
| Algeria | 6 | 2 | 1 | 3 | 8 | 7 | +1 | 7 |
| Liberia | 6 | 2 | 1 | 3 | 7 | 8 | −1 | 7 |
| Uganda | 6 | 2 | 0 | 4 | 3 | 13 | −10 | 6 |

2 October 1998

| Uganda | 2–1 | Algeria |
|---|---|---|
| Mubiru 75', 90' | | Dziri 79' |

Nakivubo Stadium, Kampala
Attendance: 25,000
Referee: Tessema Hailemalek (Ethiopia)
4 October 1998

| Tunisia | 2–1 | Liberia |
|---|---|---|
| Sellimi 41', 90' (pen.) | | Sebwe 32' |

Stade El Menzah, Tunis
Attendance: 25,000
Referee: Sidi Bekaye Magassa (Mali)

24 January 1999

| Algeria | 0–1 | Tunisia |
|---|---|---|
| | | Rouissi 44' |

5 July stadium, Algiers
Attendance: 50,000
Referee: Abderahim El Arjoun (Morocco)
24 January 1999

| Liberia | 2–0 | Uganda |
|---|---|---|
| Roberts 20'; Gebro 38' |

Samuel Kanyon Doe Sports Complex, Monrovia
Attendance: 11,000

27 February 1999

| Tunisia | 6–0 | Uganda |
|---|---|---|
| Kanzari 16'; Jaidi 33'; Boukadida 57'; Sellimi 61' (pen.); Rouissi 83'; Gabsi 85' |

Stade Olympique El Menzah, Tunis
Attendance: 35,000
Referee: Said Belqola (Morocco)
28 February 1999

| Liberia | 1–1 | Algeria |
|---|---|---|
| Roberts | | Saïfi |

Samuel Kanyon Doe Sports Complex, Monrovia
Attendance: 30,000
Referee: Zeli Sinko (Ivory Coast)

9 April 1999

| Algeria | 4–1 | Liberia |
|---|---|---|
| Merakchi 40', 45'; Saïfi 60'; V. Kpoto 85' (o.g.) | | Konwlo 61' |

19 May Stadium, Annaba
Attendance: 40,000
Referee: Malick Sillah (Gambia)
10 April 1999

| Uganda | 0–2 | Tunisia |
|---|---|---|
| | | Gabsi 18'; Rouissi 40' |

Nakivubo Stadium, Kampala
Attendance: 25,000
Referee: Omar Abdulkadir Isaack (Tanzania)

5 June 1999

| Uganda | 1–0 | Liberia |
|---|---|---|
| Ssozi 84' |

Nakivubo Stadium, Kampala
Attendance: 25,000
Referee: Hassan Mohamud (Egypt)
6 June 1999

| Tunisia | 2–0 | Algeria |
|---|---|---|
| Mhedhebi 55'; Thabet 90' |

Stade Olympique El Menzah, Tunis
Attendance: 25,000
Referee: Falla Ndoye (Senegal)

20 June 1999

| Algeria | 2–0 | Uganda |
|---|---|---|
| Merakchi 39', 56' |

19 May Stadium, Annaba
Attendance: 20,000
Referee: Abdullhakim Shelmani (Libya)
20 June 1999

| Liberia | 2–0 | Tunisia |
|---|---|---|
| Makor 50' (pen.); Weah 85' |

Samuel Kanyon Doe Sports Complex, Monrovia
Attendance: 18,000
Referee: Alex Quartey (Ghana)

== Playoff ==
Eritrea (runners-up of Group 1) and Senegal (runners-up of Group 5) joined Zimbabwe in a playoff for one place in the final tournament.

| Team | Pld | W | D | L | GF | GA | GD | Pts |
|---|---|---|---|---|---|---|---|---|
| Senegal | 4 | 3 | 0 | 1 | 11 | 4 | +7 | 9 |
| Zimbabwe | 4 | 3 | 0 | 1 | 7 | 3 | +4 | 9 |
| Eritrea | 4 | 0 | 0 | 4 | 2 | 13 | −11 | 0 |

1st leg

4 July 1999

| Eritrea | 0–1 | Zimbabwe |
|---|---|---|
| | | A. Ndlovu 25' |

Asmara Stadium, Asmara
Attendance: 10,000
Referee: Petros Mathabela (South Africa)

18 July 1999

| Senegal | 6–2 | Eritrea |
|---|---|---|
| Séne 2'; Keita 21', 52'; Traoré 30', 40'; N'Diaye 60' | | Abraha 58'; Fisahaye 68' |

Stade Léopold Sédar Senghor, Dakar
Attendance: 35,000
Referee: Mohamed Guezzaz (Morocco)

30 July 1999

| Zimbabwe | 2–1 | Senegal |
|---|---|---|
| P. Ndlovu 8'; Sawu 55' | | Traoré 77' |

National Stadium, Harare
Attendance: 40,000
Referee: Omar Isaack Abdulkadir (Tanzania)

2nd leg

8 August 1999

| Senegal | 2–0 | Zimbabwe |
|---|---|---|
| N'Diaye 15'; Diop 86' |

Stade Léopold Sédar Senghor, Dakar
Attendance: 40,000
Referee: Olufemi Olaniyan (Nigeria)

15 August 1999

| Zimbabwe | 4–0 | Eritrea |
|---|---|---|
| A. Ndlovu 61'; Sawu 69', 75', 90' |

National Stadium, Harare
Attendance: 40,000
Referee: Abdel Hamid Radwan (Egypt)

21 August 1999

| Eritrea | 0–2 | Senegal |
|---|---|---|
| | | Camara 55'; Touré 80' |

Asmara Stadium, Asmara
Attendance: 5,000
Referee: Abdulhakim El Shelmani (Libya)

== Qualified teams ==
- Algeria
- Burkina Faso
- Cameroon
- DR Congo
- Congo
- Egypt (holders)
- Gabon
- Ghana (co-hosts)
- Ivory Coast
- Morocco
- Nigeria (co-hosts)
- Senegal
- South Africa
- Togo
- Tunisia
- Zambia
