= 1997 Arab Club Champions Cup =

بطولة الأندية العربية لأبطال الدوري 1997

Tournament details
- Host country: Tunisia
- Cities: Tunis; Sfax
- Teams: 10 (from 2 confederations) (from 9 associations)
- Venues: 2 (in 2 host cities)

Final positions
- Champions: (Tunisia) Club Africain (1st title)
- Runners-up: (Egypt) Al-Ahly

Tournament statistics
- Matches played: 15
- Goals scored: 53 (3.53 per match)
- Top scorer: (Egypt) Ali Maher (5 goals)
- Best player: (Tunisia) Faouzi Rouissi
- Best goalkeeper: (Tunisia) Boubaker Zitouni

The 1997 Arab Club Champions Cup edition, was won by Tunisian side Club Africain, the hosts. It was the 13th tournament and was held from 14 to 23 November 1997.

== Preliminary round ==
=== Zone 1 (Gulf Area) ===
Kazma SC advanced to the final tournament.

=== Zone 2 (Red Sea) ===
Al Ahly and Al-Ahli advanced to the final tournament.

=== Zone 3 (North Africa) ===
Preliminary round tournament held in Sfax, Tunisia.

| Team | Pld | W | D | L | GF | GA | GD | Pts |
|---|---|---|---|---|---|---|---|---|
| (Tunisia) CS Sfaxien | 3 | 2 | 0 | 1 | 6 | 2 | +4 | 6 |
| (Algeria) WA Tlemcen | 3 | 2 | 0 | 1 | 4 | 2 | +2 | 6 |
| (Morocco) OC Khouribga | 3 | 2 | 0 | 1 | 3 | 1 | +2 | 6 |
| (Libya) Al-Shat | 3 | 0 | 0 | 3 | 0 | 8 | −8 | 0 |

Source: UTC+01:00
9 October 1997
16:00 UTC

| WA Tlemcen (Algeria) | 1 - 0 | (Morocco) OC Khouribga |
|---|---|---|
| Ghouti 5' |

Stade Taïeb Mhiri, Sfax, Tunisia
9 October 1997
18:00 UTC

| CS Sfaxien (Tunisia) | 4 – 0 | (Libya) Aschat S.C. |
|---|---|---|
| Gomis 26'; Bouaziz 32'; Trabelsi 37'; Bechaouch 80' |

Stade Taïeb Mhiri, Sfax, Tunisia

11 October 1997
16:00 UTC

| CS Sfaxien (Tunisia) | 2 - 0 | (Algeria) WA Tlemcen |
|---|---|---|
| Gomis 6'; Ylyes 14' |

Stade Taïeb Mhiri, Sfax, Tunisia
11 October 1997
18:00 UTC

| OC Khouribga (Morocco) | 1 – 0 | (Libya) Aschat S.C. |
|---|---|---|
| Mohamed El-Zarkaoui |

Stade Taïeb Mhiri, Sfax, Tunisia

13 October 1997
16:00 UTC

| CS Sfaxien (Tunisia) | 0 – 2 | (Morocco) OC Khouribga |

Stade Taïeb Mhiri, Sfax, Tunisia
13 October 1997
18:00 UTC

| WA Tlemcen (Algeria) | 3 – 0 | (Libya) Aschat S.C. |
|---|---|---|
| Mohamed Djalti; Aissa Aidara; Aissa Aidara |

Stade Taïeb Mhiri, Sfax, Tunisia

CS Sfaxien and WA Tlemcen advanced to the final tournament.

=== Zone 4 (East Region) ===
Al-Wehdat and Shabab Al-Am'ari advanced to the final tournament.

== Final tournament ==
=== Group stage ===
The eight teams were drawn into two groups of four. Each group was played on one leg basis. The winners and runners-up of each group advanced to the semi-finals.

==== Group A ====
| Team | Pld | W | D | L | GF | GA | GD | Pts |
|---|---|---|---|---|---|---|---|---|
| (Tunisia) Club Africain | 3 | 2 | 1 | 0 | 6 | 3 | +3 | 7 |
| (Saudi Arabia) Al-Ahli | 3 | 2 | 0 | 1 | 5 | 4 | +1 | 6 |
| (Algeria) WA Tlemcen | 3 | 1 | 1 | 1 | 7 | 1 | +6 | 4 |
| (Jordan) Al-Wehdat | 3 | 0 | 0 | 3 | 3 | 13 | −10 | 0 |

14 November 1997
13:45 UTC

| Al-Ahli (Saudi Arabia) | 3 – 1 | (Jordan) Al-Wehdat |
|---|---|---|
| Ibrahim Souied 44'; Sérgio 54' (pen.), 89' | | Mounir Lotfi 86' |

Stade El Menzah, Tunis, Tunisia
Referee: (Morocco) Saïd Belghoula
14 November 1997
16:00 UTC

| Club Africain (Tunisia) | 0 – 0 | (Algeria) WA Tlemcen |

Stade El Menzah, Tunis, Tunisia
Attendance: 10.000
Referee: (Kuwait) Saad Kamil

16 November 1997
14:00 UTC

| WA Tlemcen (Algeria) | 7 – 0 | (Jordan) Al-Wehdat |
|---|---|---|
| Mohamed Djalti 35' (pen.), 76'; Aissa Aidara 43', 89'; Djawed Yadel 50'; Kamel Habri 60'; Abdelmadji Kendouci 86' |

Stade El Menzah, Tunis, Tunisia
Attendance: 5.000
Referee: (Egypt) Jamil Achour
16 November 1997
17:00 UTC

| Al-Ahli (Saudi Arabia) | 1 – 3 | (Tunisia) Club Africain |
|---|---|---|
| Sérgio 45+3' | | Abdeljalil Hadda as Camacho 40', 83'; Rezki Amrouche 67' |

Stade El Menzah, Tunis, Tunisia
Referee: (United Arab Emirates) Ali Abou Djassim

18 November 1997
14:00 UTC

| Al-Ahli (Saudi Arabia) | 1 – 0 | (Algeria) WA Tlemcen |
|---|---|---|
| Hamza Salah 90+2' |

Stade El Menzah, Tunis, Tunisia
Referee: (Egypt) Jamel El Ghandour
18 November 1997
17:00 UTC

| Club Africain (Tunisia) | 3 – 2 | (Jordan) Al-Wehdat |

Stade El Menzah, Tunis, Tunisia

==== Group B ====
| Team | Pld | W | D | L | GF | GA | GD | Pts |
|---|---|---|---|---|---|---|---|---|
| (Egypt) Al-Ahly | 3 | 2 | 1 | 0 | 10 | 1 | +9 | 7 |
| (Tunisia) CS Sfaxien | 3 | 2 | 1 | 0 | 8 | 2 | +6 | 7 |
| (Kuwait) Kazma | 3 | 1 | 0 | 2 | 3 | 6 | −3 | 3 |
| (Palestine) Shabab Al-Am'ari | 3 | 0 | 0 | 3 | 1 | 13 | −12 | 0 |

14 November 1997
14:00 UTC

| Al-Ahly (Egypt) | 7 - 0 | (Palestine) Shabab Al Am'ari |
|---|---|---|
| Maher; Emara; Felix; Rayyan; Koushary; Orabi |

Stade El Menzah, Tunis, Tunisia
14 November 1997
16:00 UTC

| CS Sfaxien (Tunisia) | 3 – 1 | (Kuwait) Kazma |
|---|---|---|
| Luis Gomez 15', 35'; Abdelay N'day 67' | | Abdelhamid Al Assoussi 28' |

Stade El Menzah, Tunis, Tunisia
Referee: (Saudi Arabia) Abdelrahman

16 November 1997
14:00 UTC

| Al-Ahly (Egypt) | 2 – 0 | (Kuwait) Kazma |
|---|---|---|
| H. Hassan 20'; Maher 90+2' |

Stade El Menzah, Tunis, Tunisia
Referee: (Syria) Tedj Eddine El Ferssi
16 November 1997
17:00 UTC

| CS Sfaxien (Tunisia) | 4 – 0 | (Palestine) Shabab Al Am'ari |

Stade El Menzah, Tunis, Tunisia

18 November 1997
14:00 UTC

| Al-Ahly (Egypt) | 1 – 1 | (Tunisia) CS Sfaxien |
|---|---|---|
| Koushary |

Stade El Menzah, Tunis, Tunisia
18 November 1997
17:00 UTC

| Kazma (Kuwait) | 2 – 1 | (Palestine) Shabab Al Am'ari |

Stade El Menzah, Tunis, Tunisia

=== Knockout stage ===
Semi-finals
21 november – Tunis
(Egypt) Al-Ahly | 3
(Saudi Arabia) Al-Ahli Jeddah | 0
21 november – Tunis
(Tunisia) Club Africain (p) | 2 (4)
(Tunisia) CS Sfaxien | 2 (1)

Final
23 november – Tunis
(Tunisia) Club Africain (aet) | 2
(Egypt) Al-Ahly | 1

==== Semi-finals ====
21 November 1997
14:00 UTC

| Club Africain (Tunisia) | 2 – 2 | (Tunisia) CS Sfaxien |
|---|---|---|
| Hamdi Marzouki 41'; El Hadi Daa 51' | | Skander Souayah 38' (pen.); Mohamed Salah Meftah 45' |
Penalties
| 7. Faouzi Rouissi (penalty scored); 11. Maher Sdiri (penalty scored); 9. Abdeljalil Hadda (penalty scored); 15. Rezki Amrouche (penalty scored) | 4 - 1 | (penalty missed) 18. Nabil Chaouch; (penalty scored) 17. Ilyes Essmaili; (penalty missed) 5. Gomis |

Stade El Menzah, Tunis
Referee: (Morocco) Said Belqola

21 November 1997
14:00 UTC

| Al-Ahly (Egypt) | 3 – 0 | (Saudi Arabia) Al-Ahli Jeddah |
|---|---|---|
| Khashaba 19' (pen.); Maher 42'; Walid 81' |

Stade El Menzah, Tunis
Referee: (Syria) Taj Addin Fares
(Algeria) Miloud Heraz
(Lebanon) El-Aid

==== Final ====
23 November 1997
13:45 UTC

| Club Africain (Tunisia) | 2 – 1 (a.e.t.) | (Egypt) Al-Ahly |
|---|---|---|
| Rouissi 4'; Limam 114' | | Maher 20' |

Stade El Menzah, Tunis
Attendance: 35.000
Referee: (United Arab Emirates) Ali Bujsaim

== Winners ==
1997 Arab Club Champions Cup
(Tunisia)
Club Africain
First title

== Statistics ==
=== Goalscorers ===
| Rank | Player | Team | Goals |
|---|---|---|---|
| 1 | (Egypt) Maher | (Egypt) Al-Ahly | 5 |

=== Awards ===
Highest Scorer

- (Egypt) Maher (5 goals)

Man of the Competition

- (Tunisia) Faouzi Rouissi

Best Goalkeeper

- (Tunisia) Boubaker Zitouni

Fair Play team of the tournament
