= Zeba =

Zeba may refer to:

== People ==
=== Given name ===
- Zeba (actress, born 1945), Pakistani film actress
- Zeba Ali, Pakistani television actress and model
- Zeba Bakhtiar (born 1965), Pakistani film and television actress and director
- Zeba Blay (born 1988/89), Ghanaian-American writer
- Zeba Ghafoor, Pakistani politician
- Zeba Islam Seraj (born 1958), Bangladeshi scientist
- Zeba Shehnaz (born 1952), Pakistani actress and comedian
- Zeba Tommy, Indian singer

=== Surname ===
- Emir Zeba (1989), Bosnian footballer
- Josip Zeba (1990), Croatian footballer
- Morgan Zeba (born 1974), Swedish footballer
- Patrice Traoré Zeba (born 1972), Burkinabé sprinter
- Zajko Zeba (1983), Bosnian footballer
- Zakaria Zeba (born 1972), Burkinabé footballer

== Others ==
- Zeba Magazine
- Zeba, Michigan, a hamlet in the United States
- Zêba, a village in Tibet
- Zebah, one of the kings of Midian in the Book of Judges

== See also ==
- Ziba (disambiguation)
