= Muchanga =

Muchanga is a surname. Notable people with the surname include:

- Albert M. Muchanga (born 1959), Zambian politician
- Antoninho Muchanga (born 1967), Mozambican former footballer
- Francisco Muchanga (born 1991), Mozambican footballer
