= Zeba (surname) =

Zeba is a surname.

In Croatia and Bosnia, the name comes from the word meaning "finch" in Serbo-Croatian. The surname is also found in Burkina Faso and elsewhere.

Notable people with the name include:

- Emir Zeba (1989), Bosnian footballer
- Josip Zeba (1990), Croatian footballer
- Morgan Zeba (born 1974), Swedish footballer
- Patrice Traoré Zeba (born 1972), Burkinabé sprinter
- Zajko Zeba (1983), Bosnian footballer
- Zakaria Zeba (born 1972), Burkinabé footballer
