= N'Dayi Kalenga =

N'Dayi Kalenga may refer to:

- N'Dayi Kalenga (footballer born 1967), Congolese midfielder who played for Ankaragücü and Altay S.K. in Turkey and Zaire national team
- N'Dayi Kalenga (footballer born 1978), Congolese striker who last played for Msida St. Joseph F.C. in Malta, also played in Turkey
