= Gneto =

Gneto is a surname. Notable people with the surname include:

- Astride Gneto (born 1996), French judoka
- Kpassagnon Gneto (born 1971), Ivorian footballer
- Priscilla Gneto (born 1991), French judoka
