= Trabelsi =

Trabelsi (Arabic: الطرابلسي) is a Maghrebi Arabic surname, deriving from the city of Tripoli in Libya. Notable people with the surname include:

- Ahmed Trabelsi (born 1973), Tunisian footballer
- Bahaa Trabelsi (born 1966), Moroccan novelist
- Belhassen Trabelsi (born 1962), Tunisian businessman
- Chaima Trabelsi (born 1982), Tunisian racewalker
- Hatem Trabelsi (born 1977), Tunisian footballer
- Imed Trabelsi (born 1974), Tunisian businessman
- Karin Ann (born 2002), née Karin Ann Trabelssie, Slovak singer
- Leïla Ben Ali (born 1956), née Leila Trabelsi, former First Lady of Tunisia
- Mohamed Trabelsi (born 1968), Tunisian footballer
- Mohamed Trabelsi (volleyball) (born 1981), Tunisian male volleyball player
- Nizar Trabelsi (born 1970), Tunisian footballer
- Osnat Trabelsi (born 1965), Israeli film producer
- René Trabelsi (born 1962), French-Tunisian businessman and politician
- Sabeur Trabelsi (born 1984), Tunisian footballer
- Sami Trabelsi (born 1968), Tunisian footballer
- Samir Trabelsi (born 1968), Tunisian-Canadian economist
- Yassine Trabelsi (born 1990), Tunisian taekwondo athlete
- Youssef Trabelsi (born 1933), Tunisian footballer
