= Ziba =

Ziba may refer to:

== People ==
- Ziba (biblical figure)
- Ziba Aminzade (born 1948), Tajikistani ballet dancer
- Ziba Ganiyeva (1923–2010), Azerbaijani World War II sniper in the Red Army
- Ziba Kazemi (1948–2003), or Zahra Kazemi, Iranian-Canadian photojournalist
- Ziba Cary Keith (1842–1909), American businessman and politician in Massachusetts
- Ziba Mir-Hosseini (born 1952), Iranian legal anthropologist
- Ziba B. Oakes (1807–1871), American slave trader
- Ziba Peterson (died 1849), American Latter Day Saint missionary
- Ziba Shirazi, Iranian-American writer

== Other uses ==
- Ziba (gastropod), a genus of sea snails
- Ziba (ship), later Zebu, a Swedish-built tall ship
- Ziba, Lorestan, a village in Iran
- Ziba Design, a Portland, Oregon-based design firm founded by Sohrab Vossoughi in 1984

== See also ==
- Zeba (disambiguation)
