= Mavo (disambiguation) =

Mavo is a Japanese dada art movement.

Mavo can also refer to:

- Mavó (born 1971), Mozambican footballer
- The old name for Voorbereidend middelbaar beroepsonderwijs, a school track in the Netherlands
