= Football at the 1995 All-Africa Games – Men's team squads =

Below are the squads for the Football at the 1995 All-Africa Games, hosted by Harare, Zimbabwe, and which took place between 12 and 22 September 1995.

== Group B ==
=== Algeria ===
Head coach:

No.	Pos.	Player	Date of birth (age)	Club
	GK	Karim Saoula	19 May 1975 (aged 20)	(Algeria) ASM Oran
	GK	Abdelkader Mohcène Bensahnoun	13 January 1973 (aged 22)	(Algeria) ASO Chlef
	DF	Kada Chraâ		(Algeria) ASM Oran
	DF	Tarek Ghoul	9 January 1975 (aged 20)	(Algeria) USM El Harrach
	DF	Hocine Bouaicha	10 January 1973 (aged 22)	(Algeria) US Chaouia
	DF	Yacine Slatni	3 November 1973 (aged 21)	(Algeria) USM Annaba
	DF	Sofiane Selmoun	22 April 1975 (aged 20)	(Algeria) CR Belouizdad
	DF	Djamel Bougandoura	25 January 1973 (aged 22)	(Algeria) USM Aïn Beïda
	DF	Slimane Raho	20 October 1975 (aged 19)	(Algeria) MC Oran
	DF	... Brakni		(Algeria) RC Kouba
	MF	Ghouti Loukili	1 July 1973 (aged 22)	(Algeria) WA Tlemcen
	MF	Noureddine Kada	6 January 1975 (aged 20)	(Algeria) MC Oran
	MF	Hakim Boubrit	9 August 1974 (aged 21)	(Algeria) JS Kabylie
	MF	Fayçal Badji	15 February 1973 (aged 22)	(Algeria) CR Belouizdad
	MF	Moussa Benazzouz	31 March 1976 (aged 19)	(Algeria) MC Alger
	FW	Kouider Boukessassa	30 May 1974 (aged 21)	(Algeria) MC Oran
	FW	Samir Alliche	13 May 1974 (aged 21)	(Algeria) CRB Bordj El Kiffan
	FW	Kamel Kherkhache	2 December 1976 (aged 18)	(Algeria) USM Aïn Beïda
	FW	Mounir Dob	1 January 1974 (aged 21)	(Algeria) MC Alger
	FW	Halim Belaïtar		(Algeria) USM Blida
	FW	Rachid Amrane	15 March 1974 (aged 21)	(Algeria) ES Mostaganem
		Redouane Benmessahel		(Algeria) WA Boufarik
