= Ousseni =

Ousseni, Ousseini or Ousséni is a West African masculine given name and surname, a Francized form of Arabic Hussein. Notable people with the name include:

== Given name ==
- Ousseni Bouda (born 2000), Burkinabé footballer
- Ousseni Diop (born 1970), Burkinabé footballer
- Ousseini Djibo Idrissa (born 1998), Nigerien sprinter
- Ousseni Labo (born 1982), Togolese footballer
- Ousseini Mounpain (born 1994), Cameroonian footballer
- Ousseini Tinni (born 1954), Nigerien politician
- Ousseini Hadizatou Yacouba (born 1958), Nigerien politician
- Ousséni Yéyé (born 1987), Burkinabé footballer
- Ousseni Zongo (born 1984), Burkinabé footballer

== Surname ==
- Abdou Ousseni (fl. 21st century), Comorian politician
- Fatima Ousseni (fl. 21st century), Mahoran art collector, feminist and lawyer
- Moyadh Ousseni (born 1993), French footballer

== See also ==
- Issa Alassane-Ousséni (born 1961), Beninese sprinter
- Ousseynou, another West African form of Hussein
