= Kpassagnon =

Kpassagnon is both a given name and a surname. Notable people with the name include:

- Kpassagnon Gneto (born 1971), Ivorian footballer
- Tanoh Kpassagnon (born 1994), American football player
