= Ousseynou =

Ousseynou is a West African masculine given name, a Francized form of Arabic Hussein. Notable people with the given name include:

== Given name ==
- Ousseynou Ba (born 1995), Senegalese footballer
- Ousseynou Boye (born 1992), Senegalese footballer
- Ousseynou Cissé (born 1991), French footballer
- Ousseynou Diagné (born 1999), Senegalese footballer
- Ousseynou Guèye (born 1958), Senegalese judoka
- Ousseynou Thioune (born 1993), Senegalese footballer
- Elhadji Ousseynou Ndoye (born 1992), Senegalese footballer

== See also ==
- Ousseni, another West African form of Hussein
