= Rado Rasoanaivo =

Retired Malagasy footballer

Personal information
- Full name: Rasoanaivo Etienne Rado Hervé
- Date of birth: 14 November 1969 (age 56)
- Height: 1.62 m (5 ft 4 in)
- Position: Midfielder

Senior career*
Years	Team	Apps	(Gls)
1990–1991	FC BFV		
1993–1997	Sunrise Flacq United		
1998–2004	La Tamponnaise		
2005	AS Excelsior		

International career
1992–2003	Madagascar	40	(8)
- * Club domestic league appearances and goals

Rado Rasoanaivo (born 14 November 1969) is a retired Malagasy professional footballer. He is the current national technical director of the Federation Malagasy de Football (FMF) since 2022.

== International goals ==
Scores and results list Madagascar's goal tally first, score column indicates score after each Madagascar goal.

List of international goals scored by Rado Rasoanaivo
No.	Date	Venue	Opponent	Score	Result	Competition	Ref.
1	20 August 1993	Stade Linité, Victoria, Seychelles	Comoros	1–0	5–0	1993 Indian Ocean Island Games	
2	24 August 1993	Stade Linité, Victoria, Seychelles	Mauritius	1–1	2–1	1993 Indian Ocean Island Games	
3	24 August 1993	Stade Linité, Victoria, Seychelles	Mauritius	2–1	2–1	1993 Indian Ocean Island Games	
4	16 June 1996	National Sports Stadium, Harare, Zimbabwe	Zimbabwe	1–0	2–2	1998 FIFA World Cup qualification	
5	24 January 1999	Mahamasina Municipal Stadium, Antananarivo, Madagascar	Zambia	1–0	1–2	2000 African Cup of Nations qualification	
6	28 February 1999	Mahamasina Municipal Stadium, Antananarivo, Madagascar	DR Congo	3–0	3–1	2000 African Cup of Nations qualification	
7	17 June 2000	Mahamasina Municipal Stadium, Antananarivo, Madagascar	DR Congo	2–0	3–0	2002 FIFA World Cup qualification	
8	30 March 2003	7 November Stadium, Radès, Tunisia	Ghana	2–3	3–3	Friendly	
