= James Phiri =

Zambian footballer (1968-2001)

Personal information
- Full name: James Phiri
- Date of birth: 13 February 1968
- Place of birth: Lusaka, Zambia
- Date of death: 5 January 2001 (aged 32)
- Height: 1.90 m (6 ft 3 in)
- Position: Goalkeeper

Youth career
- 1983–1988: Chawama Youth club

Senior career*
Years	Team	Apps	(Gls)
1988–1989	Barclays Bank F.C.		
1990–1998	Zanaco F.C.		
1998–2000	Qingdao Hainiu		

International career
1993–1998	Zambia	43	(0)
- * Club domestic league appearances and goals

James Phiri (13 February 1968 – 5 January 2001) was a Zambian footballer, and is regarded as one of the best Zambian goalkeepers of his generation. He was the main goalkeeper in the squad for the 1994 and 1996 African Nations Cup tournaments and was voted Zambian Footballer of the Year for two consecutive seasons in 1993 and 1994.

Phiri first played for Chawama Youth Club before joining Zambian Second Division side Barclays Bank F.C. in the late eighties. He then joined Zanaco F.C., a club on the rise in 1990. When most of the Zambia national team was wiped out in the horrific air crash off the coast of Gabon in April 1993, Phiri was one of the goalkeepers called to the newly constituted team and he made his debut in a friendly against Malawi on 22 May 1993. Standing at almost 2m tall, he starred as Zambia just missed out on a World Cup place and settled for a place at the 1994 African Cup of Nations finals. At the end of the year, he was voted Zambian Footballer of the Year, an award which he won again the following year. At the CAN 1994 finals, Zambia defied the odds and went all the way to the final where they were pipped by Nigeria's Super Eagles 2–1.

Phiri minded the Zambian goal again at CAN 1996 in South Africa where Zambia recorded victories over Burkina Faso, Sierra Leone and most impressively, a 3–1 triumph over Egypt in the quarter-finals. However, they imploded 4–2 in the semi-final against Tunisia. When Zambia lost a FIFA World Cup qualifier to Sudan on 1 June 1996 in Khartoum, Phiri lost his place to Davies Phiri. He was the third choice goalkeeper for Zambia at CAN 1998 and later that year, he moved to Chinese club Qingdao Hainiu on a two-year deal. When his contract expired, he returned to Zambia and retired to join the Zanaco coaching bench. He also managed his own community team in Lusaka called Ibrahim Stars.

Phiri died of cancer in January 2001 in Lusaka.
