= Vincent Ye =

French-born Burkinabe footballer (born 1966)

Personal information
- Full name: Vincent Ye Lomboki
- Date of birth: 9 August 1966 (age 60)
- Place of birth: Bron, Lyon, France

Senior career*
Years	Team	Apps	(Gls)
1988–1992	Gueugnon	121	(2)

International career
1996–1997	Burkina Faso	10	(1)
- * Club domestic league appearances and goals

Vincent Ye Lomboki (born 9 August 1966) is a former professional footballer who played 121 matches and scored two goals for Ligue 2 club Gueugnon from 1988 to 1992. Born in France, Ye also had 10 caps for the Burkina Faso national team between 1996 and 1997, representing the country at the 1996 African Cup of Nations finals.

== Career ==
Ye played club football for several clubs in the lower leagues of French football.

After retiring, he became an assistant manager for French women's football clubs FC Lyon and Olympique Lyonnais (Ladies).
