= Manuel Valoi =

Mozambican footballer

Personal information
- Date of birth: 6 August 1968 (age 58)

International career
Years	Team	Apps	(Gls)
1995	Mozambique	1	(0)

Manuel Valoi (born 6 August 1968) is a Mozambican footballer. He played in two matches for the Mozambique national football team in 1995. He was also named in Mozambique's squad for the 1996 African Cup of Nations tournament.
