= Richard Bokatola =

Republic of the Congo footballer (born 1979)

Personal information
- Full name: Richard Bokatola-Lossombo
- Date of birth: 11 April 1979 (age 47)
- Place of birth: People's Republic of the Congo
- Height: 1.77 m (5 ft 10 in)
- Position: Midfielder

Senior career*
Years	Team	Apps	(Gls)
1994–1998	Inter Club Brazzaville	?	(?)
1998–2000	Karlsruher SC II	44	(6)
2000–2002	VfR Mannheim	23	(2)
2002–2006	Vllaznia Shkodër	35	(2)
2006–2007	Flamurtari Vlorë	27	(1)
2007	Kastrioti Krujë	12	(0)
2008	KF Elbasani	7	(0)
2008–2009	KS Lushnja	13	(1)
2009–2010	Turbina Cerrik	17	(2)
2013	Bangkok Christian College	1	(0)

International career
1994–2001	Republic of the Congo	9	(1)
- * Club domestic league appearances and goals

Richard Bokatola-Lossombo (born 11 April 1979) is a Congolese former professional footballer who played as a midfielder. He spent the majority of his career in Albania, with stints in his native Congo as well as Germany and Thailand. He was also a member of the Republic of the Congo national team and was in their 2000 African Cup of Nations squad.

In 2003 while he was in Albania, he hit a pedestrian couple waiting for a bus on the side of the road with his car travelling at 60 mph, killing them both instantly. He was charged with vehicular homicide and faced a five-year jail, but he was eventually released in December and returned to playing for Vllaznia Shkodër.
