= Luís Parruque =

Mozambican footballer (1969–2000)

Personal information
- Date of birth: 28 July 1969
- Place of birth: Maputo, Mozambique
- Date of death: 21 August 2000 (aged 31)
- Place of death: Maputo, Mozambique
- Height: 1.77 m (5 ft 10 in)
- Position: Defender

Senior career*
Years	Team	Apps	(Gls)
- Matchedje
- GD Maputo
- Ferroviário de Maputo

International career
1993–1997	Mozambique	28	(0)
- * Club domestic league appearances and goals

Luís Parruque (28 July 1969 – 21 August 2000) was a Mozambican footballer who played as a defender. He made 28 appearances for the Mozambique national team from 1993 to 1997. He was also named in Mozambique's squad for the 1996 African Cup of Nations tournament.

Parruque died on 21 August 2000, at the age of 31.
