= Bechir Sahbani =

Tunisian footballer

Personal information
- Date of birth: 22 October 1972 (age 54)
- Place of birth: Tunis, Tunisia
- Position: Defender

Senior career*
Years	Team	Apps	(Gls)
1994-2002	Espérance Sportive de Tunis		
2002-2004	CA Bizertin		
2004-2005	Espérance Sportive de Tunis		

International career
1994–1999	Tunisia	30	(0)
- * Club domestic league appearances and goals

Bechir Sahbani (born 22 October 1972) is a Tunisian former footballer who played as a defender. He made 30 appearances for the Tunisia national team from 1994 to 1999. He was also named in Tunisia's squad for the 1998 African Cup of Nations tournament.
