= Ibrahim Bobson Kamara =

Sierra Leonean footballer (born 1975)

Personal information
- Date of birth: 22 September 1975 (age 51)

International career
Years	Team	Apps	(Gls)
1995–2001	Sierra Leone	8	(0)

Ibrahim Bobson Kamara (born 22 September 1975) is a Sierra Leonean footballer. He played in eight matches for the Sierra Leone national football team from 1995 to 2001. He was also named in Sierra Leone's squad for the 1996 African Cup of Nations tournament.
