= Serge Bayonne =

Gabonese footballer

Personal information
- Date of birth: 31 October 1970 (age 55)

International career
Years	Team	Apps	(Gls)
1994–1996	Gabon	10	(1)

Serge Bayonne (born 31 October 1970) is a Gabonese footballer. He played in ten matches for the Gabon national football team from 1994 to 1996. He was also named in Gabon's squad for the 1996 African Cup of Nations tournament.
