= Dieudonné Londo =

Gabonese footballer

Personal information
- Date of birth: 6 June 1976 (age 50)
- Place of birth: Libreville, Gabon
- Height: 1.74 m (5 ft 8 1/2 in)
- Position: Forward

Senior career*
Years	Team	Apps	(Gls)
1995–1997	FC 105 Libreville		
1997–1999	Raja Casablanca		
1999–2000	FC 105 Libreville		
2000–2005	Mons	123	(12)
2005–2006	Akratitos	9	(1)
2006–2007	Digenis Morphou	21	(0)
2007–2008	Feignies		
2008–2010	U.R.S. du Centre	43	(12)

International career
1995–2007	Gabon	34	(11)
- * Club domestic league appearances and goals

Dieudonné Londo (born 6 June 1976) is a former Gabon international football forward who played for clubs in Gabon, Morocco, Belgium, Greece and Cyprus.

== Career ==
Born in Libreville, Londo began playing football for local side FC 105 Libreville. He had a spell in Morocco where he played for Raja Casablanca before moving to Europe. He joined Belgian Pro League club R.A.E.C. Mons for five seasons, and then joined Super League Greece side Akratitos F.C. in July 2005.

Londo would later play for Cypriot club Digenis Morphou before finishing his career in Belgium with U.R.S. du Centre.

== International career ==
He has played 34 international matches and scored 11 for Gabon.
