= Vincent Ongandzi =

Cameroonian footballer

Personal information
- Date of birth: 22 November 1975 (age 50)
- Place of birth: Meyossoa, Cameroon
- Height: 1.75 m (5 ft 9 in)
- Position: Goalkeeper

Senior career*
Years	Team	Apps	(Gls)
1996	Tonnerre		
1997	Unisport Bafang		
1998	Stade Bandjoun		
1999–2002	Unisport Bafang		
2003	Tonnerre		
2003–2006	Bloemfontein Celtic	22	(0)
2006–2007	Apollon Limassol	6	(0)

International career
1995–1998	Cameroon	11	(0)
- * Club domestic league appearances and goals

Vincent Ongandzi (born 22 November 1975) is a Cameroonian former professional footballer who played as a goalkeeper.
