= José Miguel Minhonha =

Angolan footballer

Personal information
- Date of birth: 3 November 1966 (age 59)

International career
Years	Team	Apps	(Gls)
1994–1996	Angola	10	(0)

José Miguel Minhonha (born 3 November 1966) is an Angolan footballer. He played in ten matches for the Angola national football team from 1994 and 1996. He was also named in Angola's squad for the 1996 African Cup of Nations tournament.
