= Mame Ibra Touré =

Senegalese footballer

Mame Ibra Touré (born 23 April 1971) is a retired Senegalese football midfielder.

Touré was capped for Senegal and was a squad member for the 2000 African Cup of Nations. He played club football for AS Douanes, ASC Ndiambour and SONACOS.
