= Walter Novo Estrela =

Angolan footballer

Personal information
- Date of birth: 20 November 1967 (age 58)
- Place of birth: Namibe, Angola

International career
Years	Team	Apps	(Gls)
1996	Angola	1	(0)

Walter Novo Estrela (born 20 November 1967) is an Angolan footballer. He played in one match for the Angola national football team in 1996. He was also named in Angola's squad for the 1996 African Cup of Nations tournament.
