= Alexander Theo =

Liberian footballer

Personal information
- Date of birth: 11 February 1969 (age 57)

International career
Years	Team	Apps	(Gls)
1995–1996	Liberia	2	(0)

Alexander Theo (born 11 February 1969) is a Liberian footballer. He played in two matches for the Liberia national football team in 1995 and 1996. He was also named in Liberia's squad for the 1996 African Cup of Nations tournament.
