= Terrence Dixon (footballer) =

Liberian footballer

Personal information
- Date of birth: 27 August 1975 (age 51)

International career
Years	Team	Apps	(Gls)
1995	Liberia	2	(0)

Terrence Dixon (born 27 August 1975) is a Liberian footballer who played as a defender. He played in two matches for the Liberia national football team in 1995. He was also named in Liberia's squad for the 1996 African Cup of Nations tournament.
