= Jean-Marie Kouassi =

Ivorian footballer

Personal information
- Date of birth: 3 March 1975 (age 51)

International career
Years	Team	Apps	(Gls)
1995–1997	Ivory Coast	6	(0)

Jean-Marie Kouassi (born 3 March 1975) is an Ivorian footballer. He played in six matches for the Ivory Coast national football team from 1995 to 1997. He was also named in Ivory Coast's squad for the 1996 African Cup of Nations tournament.
