= Simão Paulo =

Angolan footballer

Personal information
- Date of birth: 6 April 1966 (age 60)
- Place of birth: Luanda, Angola

International career
Years	Team	Apps	(Gls)
1994–1995	Angola	2	(0)

Simão Paulo (born 6 April 1966) is an Angolan footballer. He played in two matches for the Angola national football team in 1994 and 1995. He was also named in Angola's squad for the 1996 African Cup of Nations tournament.
