= Collins Mbulo =

Zambian footballer (1971-2009)

Personal information
- Date of birth: 15 May 1971
- Date of death: 23 October 2009 (aged 38)
- Position: Goalkeeper

International career
Years	Team	Apps	(Gls)
1997–2003	Zambia	30	(0)

Collins Mbulo (15 May 1971 – 23 October 2009) is a Zambian former professional footballer who played as a goalkeeper. He played in 30 matches for the Zambia national team from 1997 to 2003. He was also named in Zambia's squad for the 1998 African Cup of Nations tournament.
