= Mohamed Sillah (footballer) =

Sierra Leonean footballer

Personal information
- Date of birth: 1 September 1975 (age 51)
- Place of birth: Freetown, Sierra Leone
- Positions: Defender; defensive midfielder

Senior career*
Years	Team	Apps	(Gls)
1993–1994	Cappellen		
1994–1996	Lommelse S.K.		
1996–1997	FC Denderleeuw		
1997–1999	Cappellen		
1999–2001	Vanspor	39	(4)
2001–2002	Malatyaspor	3	(0)
2002–?	Scarborough Athletic		
2004–2005	Terengganu		

International career
1994–1998	Sierra Leone	3	(0)
- * Club domestic league appearances and goals

Mohamed Sillah (born 1 September 1975) is a Sierra Leonean former professional footballer who played as a defender or defensive midfielder.

== Career ==
Sillah signed a short-term contract with English club Scarborough Athletic, playing in the Northern Counties East Football League, in August 2002 following a trial.

He left Malaysian side Terengganu in February 2005.
