= Aime Kitenge =

Burundian footballer (born 1975)

Personal information
- Full name: Aime Debo Kitenge
- Date of birth: 11 November 1975 (age 50)
- Place of birth: Bujumbura, Burundi
- Position: Goalkeeper

Youth career
- 1990–1992: AS Inter Star

Senior career*
Years	Team	Apps	(Gls)
1993	AS Inter Star	18	(0)
1994–1995	Union Sporting	44	(0)
1996	Jomo Cosmos	25	(0)
1997–1998	Clydebank	0	(0)
1998–1999	St. Patrick's Athletic	0	(0)
1999–2000	Mother City	7	(0)
2000–2001	Avendale Athletico	36	(0)
2001–2002	Ria Stars	13	(0)
2002–2004	Dynamos Polokwane	45	(0)
2004–2007	Maritzburg United	70	(0)
2007–2008	Thanda Royal Zulu	8	(0)

International career
1992–2007	Burundi		
- * Club domestic league appearances and goals

Aime Debo Kitenge (born 11 November 1975) is a Burundian retired goalkeeper last with Thanda Royal Zulu in the Premier Soccer League of South Africa.

== Club career ==
In 1996, Kitenge signed for South African side Jomo Cosmos after being scouted while playing for the Burundi national under-23 football team against the South Africa national under-23 soccer team.

== International career ==
Kitenge is a Burundi international. He played for the Burundi national football team for 2004 African Cup of Nations qualification.

== Personal life ==
Kitenge was born on 11 November 1975. He obtained an engineering degree.
