= Brahima Cissé =

Burkinabé footballer

Personal information
- Date of birth: February 10, 1976 (age 50)

International career
Years	Team	Apps	(Gls)
1996–2002	Burkina Faso	16	(0)

Brahima Cissé (born 10 February 1976) is a Burkinabé football player who, as of 2006, was playing for Union Sportive des Forces Armées.

He was part of the Burkinabé 2000 and 2002 African Nations Cup teams, who finished bottom of their groups in the first round of competition, thus failing to secure qualification for the quarter-finals.
