= Abdelaziz Guechir =

Algerian footballer (born 1968)

Personal information
- Date of birth: 6 April 1968 (age 58)

International career
| Years | Team | Apps | (Gls) |
| 1995–1996 | Algeria | 9 | (2) |

Abdelaziz Guechir (born 6 April 1968) is an Algerian footballer. He played in nine matches for the Algeria national football team in 1995 and 1996. He was also named in Algeria's squad for the 1996 African Cup of Nations tournament.
