= Gbassay Bangura =

Sierra Leonean footballer (1974–2009)

Personal information
- Date of birth: 30 January 1974
- Date of death: 24 December 2009 (aged 35)
- Position: Defender

Senior career*
Years	Team	Apps	(Gls)
1996	Spånga IS		
1999–2003	FC Café Opera		
1997	Degerfors IF	24	(3)
1997	IF Elfsborg	7	(1)

International career
1995–1996	Sierra Leone		
- * Club domestic league appearances and goals

Gbassay Bangura (30 January 1974 – 24 December 2009) was a Sierra Leonean football defender. He was a squad member for the 1996 African Cup of Nations. Gbassay Bangura died in December 2009 of ALS.
