= Salif Sanou =

Burkinabé footballer

Personal information
- Date of birth: 8 November 1967 (age 58)

International career
| Years | Team | Apps | (Gls) |
| 1995 | Burkina Faso | 1 | (0) |

Salif Sanou (born 8 November 1967) is a Burkinabé footballer. He played in one match for the Burkina Faso national football team in 1995. He was also named in Burkina Faso's squad for the 1996 African Cup of Nations tournament.
