= Jenkins Cooper =

Liberian footballer

Personal information
- Date of birth: 15 April 1975 (age 51)

International career
Years	Team	Apps	(Gls)
1994–2001	Liberia	13	(1)

Jenkins Cooper (born 15 April 1975) is a Liberian former footballer who played as a defender. He played in 13 matches for the Liberia national football team from 1994 to 2001. He was also named in Liberia's squad for the 1996 African Cup of Nations tournament.
