= Antônio Diogo =

Angolan footballer

Personal information
- Date of birth: 20 May 1969 (age 57)

International career
Years	Team	Apps	(Gls)
1994–1996	Angola	9	(0)

Antônio Diogo (born 20 May 1969) is an Angolan footballer. He played in nine matches for the Angola national football team from 1994 and 1996. He was also named in Angola's squad for the 1996 African Cup of Nations tournament.
