= Camille Palenfo =

Burkinabè footballer

Personal information
- Date of birth: 6 September 1971 (age 55)

International career
Years	Team	Apps	(Gls)
1995–1997	Burkina Faso	9	(0)

Camille Palenfo (born 6 September 1971) is a Burkinabé footballer. He played in nine matches for the Burkina Faso national football team from 1995 to 1997. He was also on Burkina Faso's squad for the 1996 African Cup of Nations tournament.
