= Rui Evora Alves =

Mozambican footballer

Personal information
- Full name: Rui Fernando Évora Martins Alves
- Date of birth: 11 August 1970 (age 56)
- Place of birth: Nampula, Mozambique
- Position: Goalkeeper

International career
Years	Team	Apps	(Gls)
1992–1998	Mozambique	30	(0)

Rui Evora Alves (born 11 August 1970) is a Mozambican footballer. He played in 30 matches for the Mozambique national football team from 1992 to 1998. He was also named in Mozambique's squad for the 1998 African Cup of Nations tournament.
