= Zé Augusto (footballer, born 1968) =

Mozambican footballer

Personal information
- Full name: José Augusto Dlofo
- Date of birth: 18 April 1968 (age 58)
- Place of birth: Moroni, Territory of the Comoros
- Position: Defender

Senior career*
Years	Team	Apps	(Gls)
- Costa do Sol

International career
1995–1998	Mozambique	25	(0)
- * Club domestic league appearances and goals

José Augusto Dlofo (born 18 April 1968), better known as Zé Augusto, is a Mozambican former footballer who played as a defender for Costa do Sol. He made 25 appearances for the Mozambique national team from 1995 to 1998. He was also named in Mozambique's squad for the 1998 African Cup of Nations tournament.
