= Anicet Yala =

Gabonese footballer (born 1976)

Personal information
- Date of birth: 9 August 1976 (age 50)
- Position: Midfielder

International career
Years	Team	Apps	(Gls)
1994–2001	Gabon	21	(2)

Managerial career
- 2026: Gabon (interim)

Anicet Yala (born 9 August 1976) is a Gabonese former footballer who played as a midfielder. He made 21 appearances for the Gabon national team from 1994 to 2001. He was also named in Gabon's squad for the 1996 African Cup of Nations tournament.
