= Karim Bakhti =

Algerian footballer (born 1969)

Personal information
- Date of birth: 11 October 1969 (age 57)
- Place of birth: Algiers, Algeria
- Position: Midfielder

International career
Years	Team	Apps	(Gls)
1994–1996	Algeria	6	(0)

Karim Bakhti (born 11 October 1969) is an Algerian footballer. He played in six matches for the Algeria national football team from 1994 to 1996. He was also named in Algeria's squad for the 1996 African Cup of Nations tournament.
