= Nabil Bechaouch =

Tunisian footballer (1970–2020)

Personal information
- Date of birth: 1970
- Place of birth: Aryanah, Tunisia
- Date of death: 7 October 2020 (aged 49–50)
- Place of death: Béja, Tunisia
- Position: Forward

Senior career*
Years	Team	Apps	(Gls)
1987–1997	Olympique Béja	187	(?)
1997–1999	CS Sfaxien	?	(3)
1999–2000	Stade Tunisien	10	(9)
2000–2004	Olympique Béja	?	(?)
Total		?	(?)

International career
1993–1995	Tunisia	5	(0)
- * Club domestic league appearances and goals

Nabil Bechaouch (1970 – 7 October 2020) was a Tunisian footballer.

== Biography ==
Bechaouch played for the Tunisia from 1993 to 1995. He played three matches during the 1996 African Cup of Nations qualification. He died on 7 October 2020 of a heart attack.

== Awards ==
- Winner of the CAF Cup in 1998 with CS Sfaxien
- Winner of the Tunisian Cup in 1993 with Olympique Béja
- Winner of the Tunisian Super Cup in 1995 with Olympique Béja
