= Jacques Deckousshoud =

Gabonese footballer

Personal information
- Date of birth: 12 May 1964 (age 62)
- Position: Goalkeeper

International career
Years	Team	Apps	(Gls)
1987–2000	Gabon	25	(0)

Jacques Deckousshoud (born 12 May 1964) is a Gabonese footballer. He played in 25 matches for the Gabon national football team from 1993 to 2000. He was also named in Gabon's squad for the 1996 African Cup of Nations tournament.
