= Amadeu (Angolan footballer) =

Angolan footballer

Personal information
- Full name: Amadeu Nunes da Cunha Cristello
- Date of birth: 6 April 1966 (age 60)
- Place of birth: Gabela, Angola

International career
Years	Team	Apps	(Gls)
1994–1996	Angola	8	(0)

Amadeu Nunes da Cunha Cristello (born 6 April 1966) is an Angolan footballer. He played in eight matches for the Angola national football team from 1994 and 1996. He was also named in Angola's squad for the 1996 African Cup of Nations tournament.
