= Jonah Sarwieh =

Liberian footballer

Personal information
- Date of birth: 24 September 1975 (age 51)
- Place of birth: Monrovia, Liberia
- Position: Midfielder

International career
Years	Team	Apps	(Gls)
1994–2004	Liberia	6	(0)

Jonah Sarwieh (born 24 September 1975) is a Liberian footballer. He played in six matches for the Liberia national football team from 1994 to 2004. He was also named in Liberia's squad for the 1996 African Cup of Nations tournament.
