= Hassen Bejaoui =

Tunisian footballer (born 1975)

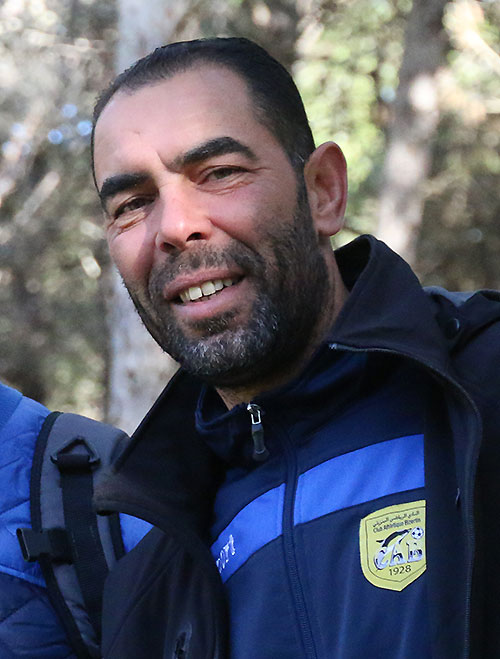

Personal information
- Date of birth: 14 February 1975 (age 51)
- Place of birth: Bizerte, Tunisia
- Position: Goalkeeper

Senior career*
Years	Team	Apps	(Gls)
- CA Bizertin
- Stade Tunisien
- CS Sfaxien

International career
2002	Tunisia MNT		
- * Club domestic league appearances and goals

Hassen Béjaoui (Arabic: حسن بيجاوي) (born 14 February 1975) is a Tunisian former football goalkeeper.

== Career ==
Bejaoui played for a few clubs, including CA Bizertin, Stade Tunisien and CS Sfaxien. He last played for CA Bizertin and participates in the Arab Champions' League.

== International ==
Bejaoui played for the Tunisia national football team and was a participant at the 2002 FIFA World Cup. He also was part of the squad at the 2002 African Cup of Nations.
