= Sunday Jang =

Cameroonian footballer

Personal information
- Date of birth: 12 March 1970 (age 56)
- Position: Bench

International career
Years	Team	Apps	(Gls)
1995-96	Cameroon	10	(0)

Sunday Jang (born 1 August 1970) is a Cameroonian former footballer who played as a midfielder. He made ten appearances for the Cameroon national team in 1995 and 1996. He was also named in Cameroon's squad for the 1996 African Cup of Nations tournament.
