= Zeba Magazine =

Zeba (Persian: زیبا) is an Afghan lifestyle and entertainment magazine based in Vienna, Virginia, United States. The magazine is published by a company with the same name, Zeba Magazine, Inc.

== History and profile ==
The first issue of Zeba was published in June 2006. The magazine has three editions, English, Dari and Pashto. It has an office in Washington, D.C., United States. Currently distribution areas are set for the highest populated European communities in the United States, Canada and nationally in Germany, Sweden and Australia. The magazine attracts a wide variety of younger and older generations.
