= Constant Tamboucha =

Gabonese footballer (born 1976)

Personal information
- Date of birth: 3 May 1976 (age 50)
- Position: Midfielder

Senior career*
Years	Team	Apps	(Gls)
- FC 105 Libreville
- Tout Puissant Akwembe

International career
1995–2001	Gabon	38	(3)
- * Club domestic league appearances and goals

Constant Tamboucha (born 3 May 1976) is a Gabonese former footballer who played as a midfielder for FC 105 Libreville and Tout Puissant Akwembe. He made 24 appearances for the Gabon national team from 1995 to 2001. He was also named in Gabon's squad for the 1996 African Cup of Nations tournament.
