= Victor Konwlo =

Liberian footballer

Personal information
- Date of birth: 1 February 1975 (age 51)
- Place of birth: West Point, Liberia
- Height: 1.72 m (5 ft 7 1/2 in)
- Position: Midfielder

Senior career*
Years	Team	Apps	(Gls)
1991–1992	Canon Yaoundé		
1992–1997	AS Cannes	26	(1)
1995–1996	→ AS Nancy (loan)	10	(1)
1997–1998	AZ	11	(1)
1998–1999	Paços de Ferreira	6	(1)
1999–2001	Caldas		

International career
- Liberia
- * Club domestic league appearances and goals

Victor Konwlo (born 1 February 1975) is a Liberian former professional footballer who played as a midfielder for Canon Yaoundé in Cameroon, AS Cannes and AS Nancy in France, AZ in the Netherlands, and Paços de Ferreira and Caldas in Portugal.

In 2001, he also had a trial with Scottish side Raith Rovers, but he was not offered a contract.
