= Calixte Zagré =

Burkinabé football manager

Personal information
- Place of birth: Burkina Faso
- Date of death: 6 December 2011

Managerial career
- Years: Team
- 1996: Burkina Faso

Calixte Zagré (died 6 December 2011) was a Burkinabé football manager. He managed the Burkina Faso national team in 1996, succeeding Drissa Traoré whom he had previously assisted.
