= Ibrahima Diarra =

Burkinabé footballer (born 1971)

Personal information
- Date of birth: 16 February 1971 (age 55)
- Position: Goalkeeper

Senior career*
Years	Team	Apps	(Gls)
- FAS Rabat

International career
1990–2002	Burkina Faso	48	(0)
- * Club domestic league appearances and goals

Ibrahima Diarra (born 16 February 1971) is a Burkinabé former professional footballer who played as a goalkeeper. He played in 33 matches for the Burkina Faso national team from 1992 to 2001. He was also named in Burkina Faso's squad for the 1998 African Cup of Nations tournament.
