= Danito Nhampossa =

Mozambican footballer

Personal information
- Date of birth: 20 March 1970 (age 56)
- Height: 1.81 m (5 ft 11 in)
- Position: Midfielder

International career
Years	Team	Apps	(Gls)
1995–2008	Mozambique	18	(0)

Danito Nhampossa (born 20 March 1970) is a Mozambican footballer. He played in 18 matches for the Mozambique national football team from 1995 to 2008. He was also named in Mozambique's squad for the 1996 African Cup of Nations tournament.
