= Bilton Musonda =

Zambian footballer (born 1971)

Personal information
- Date of birth: 9 April 1971 (age 55)
- Position: Midfielder

Senior career*
Years	Team	Apps	(Gls)
1995–1998	Mufulira Wanderers		
1998–1999	Green Buffaloes		

International career
1995–1996	Zambia	6	(1)
- * Club domestic league appearances and goals

Bilton Musonda (born 9 April 1971) is a Zambian former footballer who played as a midfielder. He played in six matches for the Zambia national football team in 1995 and 1996. He was also named in Zambia's squad for the 1996 African Cup of Nations tournament. At club level, Musonda played in the Zambia Super League for Mufulira Wanderers and Green Buffaloes.
