= Albin Nbonga Nze =

Gabonese footballer

Personal information
- Date of birth: 6 September 1971 (age 55)

International career
Years	Team	Apps	(Gls)
1992–1996	Gabon	10	(1)

Albin Nbonga Nze (born 6 September 1971) is a Gabonese footballer. He played in ten matches for the Gabon national football team from 1992 to 1996. He was also named in Gabon's squad for the 1996 African Cup of Nations tournament.
