= Albert M. Muchanga =

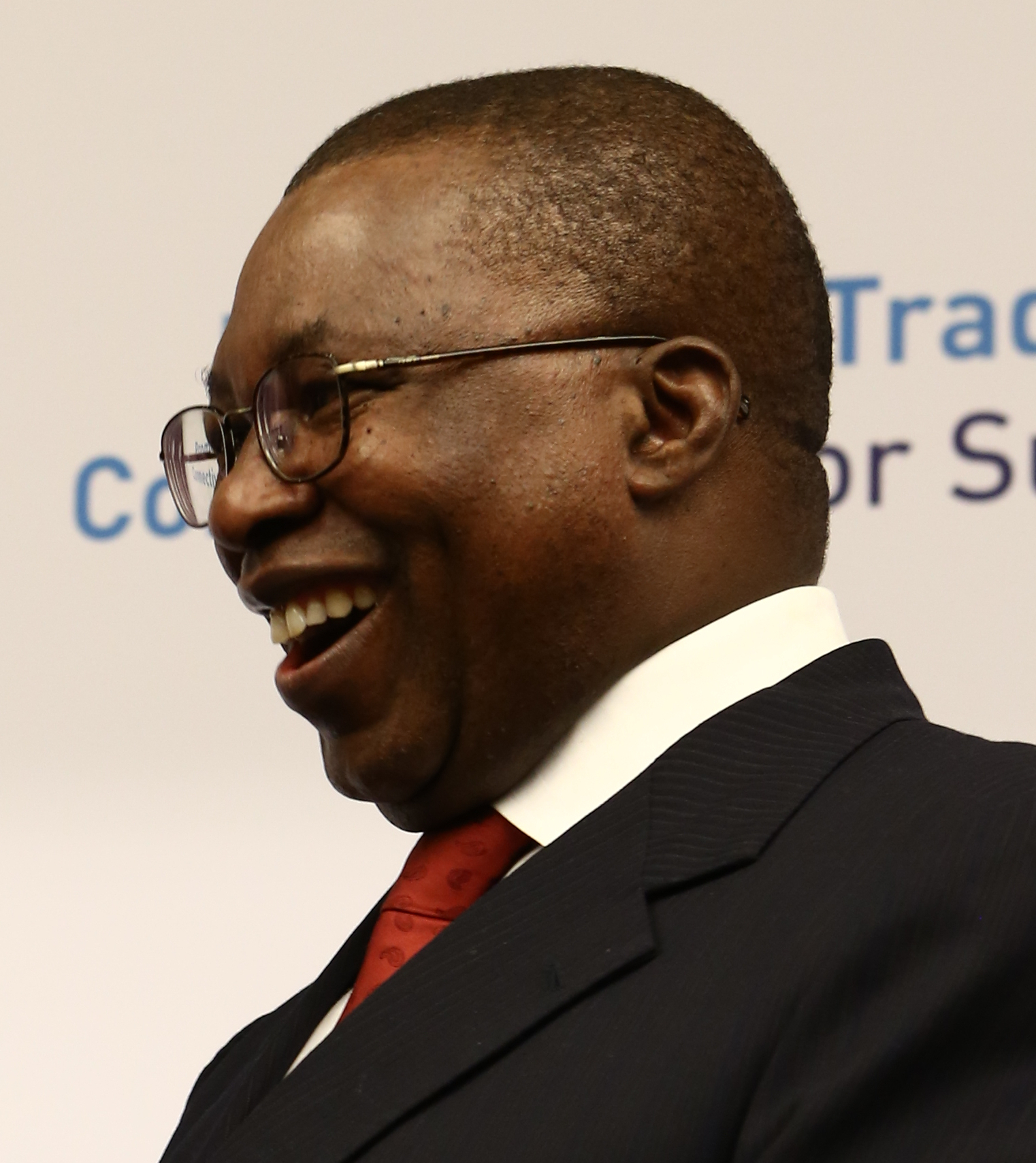
Albert M. Muchanga (2017)

Albert Mudenda Muchanga (born 21 May 1959 in Mbilu, Choma District, Zambia) is a Zambian politician and diplomat. He is currently the Commissioner for Trade and Industry in the eight-member African Union Commission.

== Life ==
Albert Muchanga was born the eldest of three children in the village of Mbilu in the Southern Province. When he was four years old, his mother died, and the family moved to Southern Rhodesia, where his father (died 2002) worked for the company Supersonic. Muchanga attended Linda Secondary School, Kabimba, Coillard, Livingstone Day and Monze Secondary School, among others . He studied at the University of Zambia (UNZA), where he obtained a bachelor's degree in business administration. He is married and has three biological daughters. He and his wife Racheal also raised five other children, four of whom were orphans of his brother who died in 1996.

== Career ==
Muchanga's career has included serving as Permanent Secretary for Parliamentary Affairs in his home country of Zambia and as Ambassador to Ethiopia and Brazil. He has also served as Deputy Executive Secretary of the Southern African Development Community (SADC).

On 30 January 2016, his first term as Commissioner for Trade and Industry began. In this capacity, Muchanga attended the South-South Cooperation Conference, a UN-supported initiative of the countries of the Global South, in Buenos Aires in March 2019. On the sidelines of the conference, Muchanga also met with Achim Steiner, the head of the United Nations Development Programme (UNDP).

In 2021, Muchanga was re-elected as AU Commissioner for a term of four years with 44 out of 53 votes. In addition to trade and industry, he has since then also been responsible for the previously separate area of economic affairs (Commissioner for Economic Development, Trade, Industry and Mining), as a result of the reduced number of commissioners.
