= Carlos Pedro =

Angolan footballer (born 1969)

Carlos Pedro Pires de Melo
Personal information
- Date of birth: 6 April 1969 (age 57)
- Place of birth: Luanda, Angola
- Position: Midfielder

International career
Years	Team	Apps	(Gls)
1988–2000	Angola	32	(0)

Carlos Pedro Pires de Melo (born 6 April 1969) is an Angolan footballer. He played in 23 matches for the Angola national football team from 1989 to 2000. He was also named in Angola's squad for the 1998 African Cup of Nations tournament.
