= Aurélio Soares =

Angolan footballer (born 1974)

Personal information
- Full name: Aurélio de Sousa Soares
- Date of birth: 18 April 1974 (age 52)
- Place of birth: Benguela, Angola
- Height: 1.84 m (6 ft 0 in)
- Position: Centre-back

Senior career*
Years	Team	Apps	(Gls)
1996	1º de Agosto		
1997	Petro de Luanda		
1997–1998	Académica Coimbra	14	(0)
1998–1999	Petro de Luanda		
2000–2007	1º de Agosto		

International career
1994–1999	Angola	22	(1)
- * Club domestic league appearances and goals

Aurélio de Sousa Soares (born 18 April 1974) is an Angolan former professional footballer who played as a centre-back. He played in 22 matches for the Angola national team from 1994 to 1999. He was also named in Angola's squad for the 1998 African Cup of Nations tournament.
