= Cachela Boane =

Mozambican footballer

Personal information
- Date of birth: 28 December 1972 (age 53)
- Position: Forward

International career
Years	Team	Apps	(Gls)
1993–1997	Mozambique	13	(1)

Cachela Boane (born 28 December 1972) is a Mozambican footballer. He played in 13 matches for the Mozambique national football team from 1993 to 1997. He was also named in Mozambique's squad for the 1996 African Cup of Nations tournament.
