= Luisinho Dias =

Mozambican footballer

Personal information
- Full name: Luís Germano Borlotes Dias
- Date of birth: 14 April 1973 (age 53)
- Position: Goalkeeper

International career
Years	Team	Apps	(Gls)
1996–1999	Mozambique	18	(0)

Luís Germano "Luisinho" Borlotes Dias (born 14 April 1973) is a Mozambican former footballer who played as a goalkeeper. He played in 18 matches for the Mozambique national team from 1996 to 1999. He was also named in Mozambique's squad for the 1998 African Cup of Nations tournament.
