= Orlando (Angolan footballer) =

Angolan footballer

Personal information
- Full name: Orlando de Dias Camargo
- Date of birth: 25 February 1966 (age 60)

International career
Years	Team	Apps	(Gls)
1996	Angola	3	(0)

Orlando de Dias Camargo (born 25 February 1966) is an Angolan footballer. He played in three matches for the Angola national football team in 1996. He was also named in Angola's squad for the 1996 African Cup of Nations tournament.
