= Pierre Kouada =

Burkinabé footballer

Personal information
- Date of birth: 29 June 1966 (age 60)

International career
Years	Team	Apps	(Gls)
1994–1997	Burkina Faso	10	(0)

Pierre Kouada (born 29 June 1966) is a Burkinabé footballer. He played in ten matches for the Burkina Faso national football team from 1994 to 1997. He was also named in Burkina Faso's squad for the 1996 African Cup of Nations tournament.
