= Michael Wreh =

Liberian footballer

Personal information
- Date of birth: 2 April 1979 (age 47)

International career
Years	Team	Apps	(Gls)
1997	Liberia	4	(0)

Michael Wreh (born 2 April 1979) is a Liberian footballer. He played in four matches for the Liberia national football team in 1997. He was also named in Liberia's squad for the 1996 African Cup of Nations tournament.
