= Hassane Kamagaté =

Burkinabé footballer (born 1970)

Personal information
- Date of birth: 6 May 1970 (age 56)
- Position: Midfielder

International career
Years	Team	Apps	(Gls)
1994–1997	Burkina Faso	20	(0)

Hassane Kamagaté (born 6 May 1970) is a Burkinabé former footballer who played as a midfielder. He made 20 appearances for the Burkina Faso national team from 1994 to 1997. He was also named in Burkina Faso's squad for the 1996 African Cup of Nations tournament.
