= Louis Gomis (footballer, born 1974) =

Senegalese footballer

Personal information
- Full name: Louis Gomis
- Date of birth: 3 December 1974 (age 51)
- Place of birth: Dakar, Senegal
- Height: 1.93 m (6 ft 4 in)
- Position: Forward

Senior career*
Years	Team	Apps	(Gls)
- ASC Yeggo
1997–1998	CS Sfaxien		
1998–1999	Étoile Sahel		
1999–2000	K.F.C. Lommel S.K.	19	(2)
2001–2002	1. FC Nürnberg	48	(12)
2002–2003	MSV Duisburg	25	(2)
2003	Mons	11	(3)
2004	Apollon Limassol	6	(1)
2004–2005	Angers	6	(1)
2005–2006	Club Sportif Sfaxien		
2006	Berlin AK 07		

International career
	Senegal	28	(5)
- * Club domestic league appearances and goals

Louis Gomis (born 3 December 1974) is a Senegalese former professional footballer. Most notably he played in the Bundesliga for 1. FC Nürnberg.

== Honors ==
1. FC Nürnberg

- 2. Bundesliga: 2000–01

'(Etoile du Sahel Sousse)1999 Club Sportif Sfaxien

- CAF Cup: 1998
