= Alex Namazaba =

Zambian footballer (born 1973)

Personal information
- Date of birth: 5 May 1973 (age 53)

International career
Years	Team	Apps	(Gls)
1995–1999	Zambia	13	(3)

Alex Namazaba (born 5 May 1973) is a Zambian footballer. He played in 13 matches for the Zambia national football team from 1995 to 1999. He was also named in Zambia's squad for the 1996 African Cup of Nations tournament.
