= Tomás Inguana =

Mozambican footballer

Tomás
Personal information
- Full name: Tomás Manuel Inguana
- Date of birth: 13 January 1973 (age 53)
- Place of birth: Maputo, Mozambique
- Position: Defender

Senior career*
Years	Team	Apps	(Gls)
1995–1998	Desportivo de Maputo	55	(2)
1998–1999	Ferroviário	32	(6)
1999–2001	Orlando Pirates	59	(3)
2001–2002	AmaZulu	13	(0)
2002–2004	Orlando Pirates	4	(0)
2004	Nam Dinh	-	(-)
2004–2006	Wits University	-	(-)

International career^{‡}
1995–2004	Mozambique	33	(2)
- * Club domestic league appearances and goals as of - ‡ National team caps and goals as of -

Tomás Manuel Inguana (born 13 January 1973 in Maputo) is a Mozambican retired football defender.

== Career ==
During his career he played for Desportivo de Maputo, Ferroviário, Orlando Pirates, AmaZulu, Nam Dinh and Wits University.

Inguana was capped for the Mozambique between 1995 and 2004 earning 33 caps and scoring two goals, he also represented his national at two Africa Cup of Nations tournaments in 1996 and 1998.

After retiring from playing, Inguane went into football administration. He is now a director of Grupo Desportivo de Maputo.
