= Jean-Martin Mouloungui =

Gabonese footballer

Personal information
- Date of birth: 30 November 1969 (age 56)
- Position: Defender

Senior career*
| Years | Team | Apps | (Gls) |
- Mbilinga FC
- Panelefsiniakos

International career
| 1993–2000 | Gabon | 48 | (2) |
- * Club domestic league appearances and goals

Jean-Martin Mouloungui (born 30 November 1969) is a Gabonese footballer who played as a defender for Mbilinga FC and Greek club Panelefsiniakos. He made 46 appearances for the Gabon national team from 1993 to 2000. He was also named in Gabon's squad for the 1996 African Cup of Nations tournament.
