= Mavó =

Mozambican footballer

Personal information
- Full name: Jorge Joaquim Messa Vulande
- Date of birth: 4 October 1971 (age 55)
- Height: 1.73 m (5 ft 8 in)
- Position: Midfielder

Senior career*
Years	Team	Apps	(Gls)
- Clube Ferroviário da Beira
- CD Costa do Sol
–2007	GD Maputo		
2008–2009	CD Chingale		
2010	HCB Songo		

International career
1996–2003	Mozambique	28	(1)
- * Club domestic league appearances and goals

Jorge Joaquim Messa Vulande, called Mavó (born 4 October 1971) is a Mozambican retired football midfielder.
