= Antoninho Muchanga =

Mozambican footballer

Personal information
- Date of birth: 24 November 1965 (age 60)
- Place of birth: Maputo, Mozambique
- Position: Midfielder

Senior career*
Years	Team	Apps	(Gls)
- Maxaquene

International career
1994–2000	Mozambique	18	(0)
- * Club domestic league appearances and goals

Antoninho Muchanga (born 24 November 1965) is a Mozambican former footballer who played as a midfielder for Maxaquene. At international level, he made 18 appearances for the Mozambique national team from 1994 to 2000. He was also named in Mozambique's squad for the 1996 African Cup of Nations tournament.
