= N'Dayi Kalenga (footballer, born 1967) =

Congolese footballer

Personal information
- Date of birth: 12 December 1967 (age 58)
- Place of birth: Kamina, DR Congo
- Position: Midfielder

Senior career*
Years	Team	Apps	(Gls)
–	??		
1994–1997	Ankaragücü	87	(24)
1998	Altay S.K.	10	(1)

International career
–1996	Zaire		
- * Club domestic league appearances and goals

N'Dayi Kalenga (born 12 December 1967 in Kamina) is a Congolese former professional football midfielder who played for Ankaragücü and Altay S.K. in Turkey.

Kalenga was included in the Zaire national football team at the 1996 African Cup of Nations.
