= Mamadou Koné (footballer, born 1974) =

Burkinabé footballer (born 1974)

Personal information
- Date of birth: 6 March 1974 (age 52)
- Position: Defender

Senior career*
Years	Team	Apps	(Gls)
- US des Forces Armées
- EF Ouagadougou
- US des Forces Armées

International career
1994–2001	Burkina Faso	34	(1)
- * Club domestic league appearances and goals

Mamadou Koné (born 6 March 1974) is a Burkinabé former footballer who played as a defender for US des Forces Armées and EF Ouagadougou. He made 30 appearances for the Burkina Faso national team from 1995 to 2000. He was also named in Burkina Faso's squad for the 1996 African Cup of Nations tournament.
