= Boubaker Zitouni =

Tunisian footballer

Personal information
- Date of birth: 16 November 1965 (age 60)
- Place of birth: Tunis, Tunisia
- Position: Goalkeeper

Senior career*
Years	Team	Apps	(Gls)
1983–1990	CO Transports		
1990–1998	Club Africain		

International career
1988–1997	Tunisia	25	(0)
- * Club domestic league appearances and goals

Boubaker Zitouni (born 16 November 1965) is a Tunisian former footballer who played as a goalkeeper. He made 23 appearances for the Tunisia national team from 1989 to 1997. He was also named in Tunisia's squad for the 1996 African Cup of Nations tournament.
