= Ghouti Loukili =

Algerian footballer (born 1973)

Personal information
- Full name: Ghouti Loukili
- Date of birth: July 1, 1973 (age 53)
- Place of birth: Tlemcen, Algeria
- Height: 1.73 m (5 ft 8 in)
- Position: Midfielder

Team information
- Current team: MSP Batna

Senior career*
| Years | Team | Apps | (Gls) |
| 1994–2000 | WA Tlemcen | | |
| 2000–2003 | NA Hussein Dey | 24 | (3) |
| 2003–2004 | WA Tlemcen | 24 | (0) |
| 2004–2005 | USM Annaba | 27 | (2) |
| 2005 | US Biskra | 12 | (0) |
| 2006 | MO Béjaïa | | |
| 2007–2008 | ASM Oran | 11 | (0) |
| 2008– | MSP Batna | 28 | (0) |

International career^{‡}
| 1998 | Algeria | 1 | (0) |
- * Club domestic league appearances and goals as of July 2009 ‡ National team caps and goals as of November 2009

Ghouti Loukili (born July 1, 1973) is an Algerian football player who is currently playing as a defender for MSP Batna in the Algerian Championnat National.
