= Davies Phiri =

Zambian footballer (born 1976)

Personal information
- Date of birth: 1 April 1976 (age 50)
- Place of birth: Mufulira, Zambia

Team information
- Current team: AmaZulu

Davies Phiri (born 1 April 1976 in Mufulira) is a former Zambian football (soccer) goalkeeper who is currently the goalkeeper coach for Durban based football team, AmaZulu F.C. He previously played for Durban Stars, Golden Arrows and Kabwe Warriors.

As a player he was part of the Zambian 1996 African Cup of Nations squad that lost in the semi-finals to Tunisia 4–2. He was a member of the 1998 African Cup of Nations squad, that finished third in group D on 4 points; the 2000 African Nations Cup team, who finished third in group C in the first round of competition; and, part of the 2002 African Cup of Nations squad that finished fourth in Group D on 1 point.

As a coach he was drafted in 2011 into the Zambian technical team to help prepare the squad for the 2012 Africa Cup of Nations. The team went on to win the competition, 8–7 on penalties against Ivory Coast.

== Coaching career ==
Year	Team	Position
2014–Present	AmaZulu F.C.	Goalkeeper coach
2011– Present	Zambia national football team	Goalkeeper Coach
2011	Black Aces Fc	Goalkeeper Coach
2010-2011	Nathi Lions	Goalkeeper Coach
2009-2010	Thanda Zulu Royals	Goalkeeper Coach

== Playing career ==
Years	Team
1994-2004	Zambia National Team
2007-2008	Durban Stars
2002-2007	Golden Arrows
1993-2002	Kabwe Warriors
