= Ahmed Trabelsi =

Tunisian footballer

Personal information
- Date of birth: 27 July 1973 (age 53)

International career
Years	Team	Apps	(Gls)
1995–1996	Tunisia	7	(0)

Ahmed Trabelsi (born 27 July 1973) is a Tunisian footballer. He played in seven matches for the Tunisia national football team in 1995 and 1996. He was also named in Tunisia's squad for the 1996 African Cup of Nations tournament.
