= Ousseni Diop =

Burkinabé footballer

Personal information
- Date of birth: 20 December 1970 (age 55)
- Position: Defender

International career
| Years | Team | Apps | (Gls) |
| 1992–1996 | Burkina Faso | 11 | (0) |

Ousseni Diop (born 20 December 1970) is a Burkinabé footballer. He played in eleven matches for the Burkina Faso national football team from 1992 to 1996. He was also named in Burkina Faso's squad for the 1996 African Cup of Nations tournament.
