= Emir Zeba =

Bosnia and Herzegovina footballer

Personal information
- Date of birth: 10 June 1989 (age 37)
- Place of birth: Sarajevo, SFR Yugoslavia
- Height: 1.75 m (5 ft 9 in)
- Position: Midfielder

Youth career
- 2006–2008: FK Baumit Jablonec

Senior career*
Years	Team	Apps	(Gls)
-2009	Željezničar		
2009	→ Famos Hrasnica (loan)		
2010	Ozren Semizovac		
2011–2012	Slavija Sarajevo	38	(2)
2012–2013	České Budějovice	4	(0)
2013–2014	Znojmo	15	(1)
2014	České Budějovice	0	(0)
2014–2016	Slavija Sarajevo	41	(0)
2016–2017	Metalleghe-BSI	19	(1)
2017–2018	Olimpik		
- * Club domestic league appearances and goals as of 5 June 2021

Emir Zeba (born 10 June 1989) is a Bosnian-Herzegovinian retired football player who played as a midfielder.

== Club career ==
Zeba joined second tier-Olimpik from Metalleghe-BSI in summer 2017.
