= Zakaria Zeba =

Burkinabé footballer

Personal information
- Date of birth: 20 September 1972 (age 54)
- Place of birth: Republic of Upper Volta

International career
Years	Team	Apps	(Gls)
1994–1997	Burkina Faso	10	(0)

Zakaria Zeba (born 20 September 1972) is a Burkinabé footballer. He played in ten matches for the Burkina Faso national football team from 1994 to 1997. He was also named in Burkina Faso's squad for the 1996 African Cup of Nations tournament.
