= Kpassagnon Gneto =

Ivorian footballer (born 1971)

Personal information
- Date of birth: 25 January 1971 (age 55)

International career
Years	Team	Apps	(Gls)
1991–1997	Ivory Coast	19	(0)

Kpassagnon Gneto (born 25 January 1971) is an Ivorian footballer. He played in 19 matches for the Ivory Coast national football team from 1991 to 1997. He was also named in Ivory Coast's squad for the 1996 African Cup of Nations tournament.
