= 1994 African Cup of Nations final =

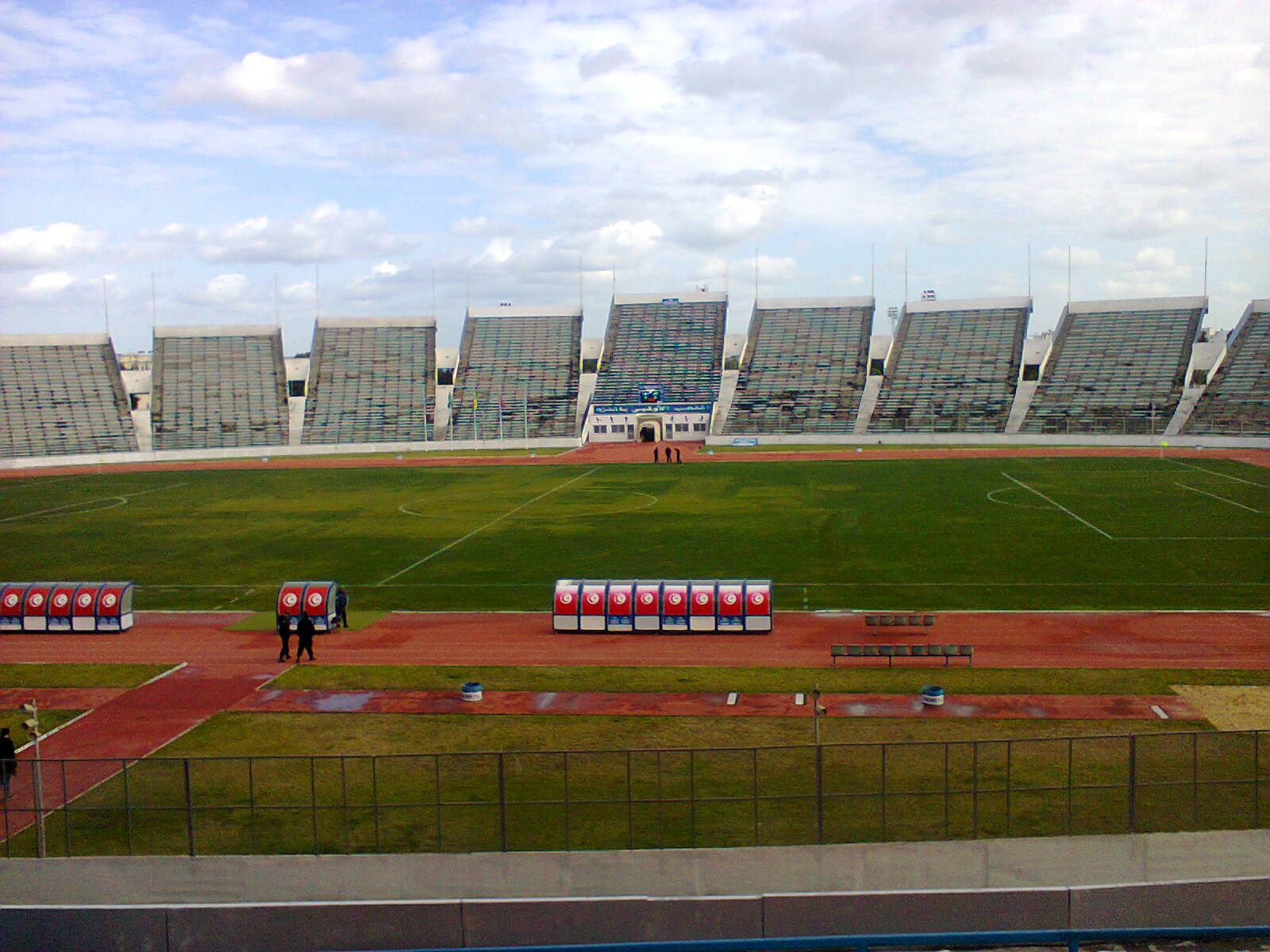
- Stade El Menzah in Tunis hosted the final
- Event: 1994 African Cup of Nations
Nigeria	Zambia
(Nigeria)	(Zambia)
2	1
- Date: 10 April 1994
- Venue: Stade El Menzah, Tunis
- Referee: Lim Kee Chong (Mauritius)
- Attendance: 25,000

The 1994 African Cup of Nations final was a football match that took place on 10 April 1994, and was the final match of the 19th edition of the Africa Cup of Nations. It was played in the Stade El Menzah in Tunis, Tunisia. Nigeria won its second championship, beating Zambia in the final 2−1.

The Zambian team was recently constituted, following the 1993 air disaster in which eighteen players and several staff members from the previous team were killed.

== Road to the final ==
Nigeria		Zambia	
Opponents	Results	Opponents	Results
Group stage
Gabon	3–0	Sierra Leone	0–0
Egypt	0–0	Ivory Coast	1–0
Quarter-finals
Zaire	2–0	Senegal	1–0
Semi-finals
Ivory Coast	2–2 (4–2 p)	Mali	4–0

== Match ==
=== Details ===
10 April 1994

Nigeria	2–1	Zambia
Amunike 5', 47'	Report; Report	Litana 3'

Stade El Menzah, Tunis, Tunisia
Attendance: 25,000
Referee: Lim Kee Chong (Mauritius)

Nigeria	Zambia

GK	22	Peter Rufai
RB	2	Augustine Eguavoen (c)	(yellow card) 78'
CB	5	Uche Okechukwu
CB	6	Uche Okafor
LB	3	Benedict Iroha	(yellow card) 68'
DM	15	Sunday Oliseh
RM	7	Finidi George		(substituted off) 41'
LM	11	Emmanuel Amunike
AM	10	Jay-Jay Okocha		(substituted off) 73'
CF	14	Daniel Amokachi
CF	9	Rashidi Yekini
Substitutions:
FW	13	Samson Siasia		(substituted on) 41'
DF	19	Nduka Ugbade		(substituted on) 73'
Manager:
(Netherlands) Clemens Westerhof

GK	1	James Phiri
SW	2	Harrison Chongo
RB	3	Elijah Litana	(yellow card) 25'
CB	5	Mordon Malitoli	(yellow card) 42'
LB	13	Aggrey Chiyangi
RM	4	Kapambwe Mulenga		(substituted off) 60'
CM	14	Joel Bwalya
CM	10	Evans Sakala
LM	12	Kenneth Malitoli
CF	9	Zeddy Saileti
CF	11	Kalusha Bwalya (c)		(substituted off) 70'
Substitutions:
MF	18	Linos Makwaza		(substituted on) 60'
FW	7	Johnson Bwalya		(substituted on) 70'
Manager:
(Scotland) Ian Porterfield

Assistant referees:
El-Jilali R'Harib (Morocco)
Abdel-Magid Hassan (Egypt)
