= Stephen Kunda =

Zambian footballer (born 1984)

Personal information
- Date of birth: August 17, 1984 (age 42)
- Place of birth: Zambia
- Height: 1.84 m (6 ft 1/2 in)
- Positions: Defender; defensive midfielder

Senior career*
Years	Team	Apps	(Gls)
2004–2007	Power Dynamos	?	(?)
2007–2010	RoPS	99	(2)
2008	→ Power Dynamos (loan)		

International career
2004	Zambia	1	(0)
- * Club domestic league appearances and goals as of 16 October 2010(UTC)

Stephen Kunda (born August 17, 1984) is a Zambian former football central defender. He played for Power Dynamos F.C. in his home country before moving to Finland. Kunda can also play as a defensive midfielder. Kunda had a contract with RoPS until the end of season 2012.

Kunda was one of the Zambians who came to RoPS in 2007. He came along with Nchimunya Mweetwa, Chanda Mwaba, Chileshe Chibwe and Zeddy Saileti's younger brother Derik Saileti for a trial. Quintet (Mweetwa, Kunda, Chibwe, Mwaba) got contract's with RoPS. Kunda signed with RoPS 3-years long contract including 2-years option. Later season he extended his contract to 2012. After the season RoPS won promotion to Veikkausliiga (Finnish Premier Division).

Originally in RoPS, Kunda was considered to play as a defensive midfielder, but he was later dropped to defence after RoPS had some injuries and bans with their defenders. Kunda performed well in central defence and subsequently, he was made regular central defender. Kunda has good technical skill and keeps cool head even under pressure from opposite players. During the 2010 season Kunda has played in the midfield position, while Jarkko Lahdenmäki has been the starting defender with American Etchu Tabe.

On August 2, 2008, Kunda was chosen as a central defender in the Finnish Premier League's best XI in July.

On 15 November 2008, RoPS informed that Kunda has been loaned to his former club Power Dynamos F.C. and he played some games with Mwaba on guest player status.

He has played once in Zambia's national football team.

Kunda and eight other RoPS players got sacked in the spring of 2011 due to match fixing scandal.

== Career statistics ==
As of 16 October 2010

Club	Season	League		Play-offs		Cup		League Cup		Total	
Club	Season	Apps	Goals	Apps	Goals	Apps	Goals	Apps	Goals	Apps	Goals
Rovaniemen Palloseura
Rovaniemen Palloseura	2007	26	0	1	0	0	0	0	0	27	0
Rovaniemen Palloseura	2008	24	0	0	0	3	0	6	0	33	0
Rovaniemen Palloseura	2009	25	0	0	0	1	1	4	0	30	1
Rovaniemen Palloseura	2010	23	2	0	0	0	0	0	0	23	2
Career total		98	2	1	0	4	1	10	0	113	3
