= Jack Chileshe =

Zambian footballer (born 1983)

Personal information
- Full name: Jackson Chileshe Chibwe
- Date of birth: 14 October 1983 (age 43)
- Place of birth: Lusaka, Zambia
- Height: 1.68 m (5 ft 6 in)
- Position: Midfielder

Senior career*
Years	Team	Apps	(Gls)
2004	Lusaka Celtic F.C.		
2005–2007	Zanaco F.C.		
2007–2011	RoPS	86	(20)
2011–2014	Primeiro de Agosto		
2015–2017	Progresso Lunda Sul		
2018	Zanaco F.C.		
2018–2019	Saurimo FC		

International career
2006–2007	Zambia	2	(0)
- * Club domestic league appearances and goals

Jackson "Jack" Chileshe Chibwe (born 14 October 1983) is a retired Zambian football midfielder. A versatile forward, Chibwe can play either as a winger or attacking midfielder / second striker. Despite his short stature, Chibwe is known to be a good header of the ball. In 2011, he was convicted of match-fixing after taking bribes to fix the outcome of eleven games.

== Career ==
Chibwe was one of the Zambians who came to RoPS in 2007. He came along with Nchimunya Mweetwa, Chanda Mwaba, Stephen Kunda and Zeddy Saileti's younger brother Derik Saileti for a trial. The quintet consisting of (Mweetwa, Kunda, Chibwe, Mwaba) were awarded contracts with RoPS following a successful trial. Chibwe later extended it to 2012. In the 2007/08 season, Chibwe played 23 games and scored four times in the Finnish second division, Ykkönen, at the end of which RoPS won promotion to the Veikkausliiga (Finnish Premier Division).

Chibwe finished as RoPS's top goalscorer along with Saileti and Titi Essomba in the 2008/09 Veikkausliiga, scoring five goals and providing three assists. He was one of the most important players during the season which saw RoPS finish 10th in the league. In autumn of 2008 he had some injury concerns, but he soon after recovered and played 24 times, scoring two goals and providing two assists in 2009. The following season, Chibwe scored nine goals and provided one assist, before succumbing to a knee injury requiring surgery, effectively ending his season.

Chibwe and eight other RoPS players got sacked in the spring of 2011 due to a match fixing scandal.
