= Nchimunya Mweetwa =

Zambian footballer (born 1984)

Personal information
- Full name: Nchimunya Abishai Mweetwa
- Date of birth: March 22, 1984 (age 42)
- Place of birth: Lusaka, Zambia
- Height: 1.87 m (6 ft 1 1/2 in)
- Position: Striker

Senior career*
Years	Team	Apps	(Gls)
1999	Kabibya United		
2003	Medical Stars		
2004	Ndola United		
2005	Kitwe United		
2006	Zesco United		
2007–2010	RoPS	73	(34)
2013–2014	NAPSA Stars		
2014–2015	SC Villa		
2015–	Nico United		

International career
2005	Zambia	3	(3)
- * Club domestic league appearances and goals as of 31 October 2018

Nchimunya Mweetwa (born March 22, 1984) is a Zambian football striker for Nico United.

== Career ==
Mweetwa began his career whilst still at high school, with his Choma based school being a feeder club for local second division club Kabibya United.

After playing for Medical Stars, Ndola United, Kitwe United and Zesco United in Zambia, Mweetwa went on trial with Finnish Veikkausliiga club RoPS, eventually signing with them. During his first season with RoPS, Mweetwa scored 17 goals in 24 games, which included a run of scoring 1 goal in 12 consecutive games. Mweetwa's second season was cut short by a serious knee injury.

In the 2010 Ykkönen season Mweetwa made dramatic come-back with total of 13 goals in 23 games, of which in 13 he was in the starting line-up. He was the top scorer for RoPS and according to local newspaper Lapin Kansa, he received three offers from foreign clubs outside Finland.

In August 2014, Mweetwa was named as one of three foreign players for SC Villa's 2014–15 Uganda Super League season.

In September 2015, Mweetwa received a work permit to join Botswana Premier League club Nico United.

== Match fixing ==
On 24 March 2011, Mweetwa and seven other RoPS players, Godfrey Chibanga, Chileshe Chibwe, Francis Kombe, Stephen Kunda, Christopher Musonda, Chanda Mwaba, Pavle Khorguashvili and Valter Khorguashvili were all arrested and taken into custody on match-fixing charges. In July 2011, Mweetwa received a suspended jail sentence for his part in the match fixing scandal. On 30 April 2012, Chibanga, Chibwe, Kunda, Musonda, Mwaba, Nchimunya and Mweetwa were all banned from football by FIFA until 5 April 2013. Nchimunya Mweetwa was appointed IOC Believe in Sport Ambassador for the Paris 2024 Olympic Games. He has served as a Believe in Sport Ambassador since 2020, focusing on the Prevention of the Manipulation of Competitions in Sport.

== Career statistics ==
=== International ===
Zambia national team
Year	Apps	Goals
2005	3	3
Total	3	3

Statistics accurate as of match played 1 October 2005
