= Fernand Coulibaly =

Malian footballer (born 1971)

Personal information
- Date of birth: 1 August 1971 (age 55)
- Place of birth: Ségou, Mali
- Height: 1.72 m (5 ft 8 in)
- Position: Striker

Senior career*
Years	Team	Apps	(Gls)
1987–1991	Stade Lavallois	18	(3)
1991–1992	AS Saint-Etienne II	16	(7)
1993–1994	Al-Wahda	27	(12)
1994–1995	Adana Demirspor	24	(9)
1995–1997	Gaziantepspor	45	(16)
1997–1998	Ankaragücü	27	(13)
1999	Gaziantepspor	5	(2)
1999–2000	Vanspor	19	(9)
2000–2002	Denizlispor	39	(17)
2001	→ Siirtspor (loan)	13	(5)
2002–2003	Diyarbakırspor	7	(1)

International career
1992–2000	Mali	32	(8)
- * Club domestic league appearances and goals

Fernand Coulibaly (born 1 August 1971) is a retired Malian professional football striker who played for several clubs in Europe and the Mali national football team. He has Turkish citizenship with the name Muhammed Doğan.

Coulibaly was born in Ségou. He played for Adana Demirspor, Gaziantepspor, Ankaragücü and Denizlispor in the Turkish Süper Lig. He also played for Stade Lavallois in the French Ligue 1.

He was included in the Mali national football team at the 1994 African Cup of Nations.

During October 2005, Coulibaly was imprisoned at the Bamako Central Prison following an investigation of his investments with the Banque l'Habitat Mali.
