= Bassolé =

Bassolé is a surname. Notable people with the surname include:

- Angèle Bassolé-Ouédraogo (born 1967), Ivoirian-born Canadian poet
- Djibrill Bassolé (born 1957), Burkinabé politician
- Michel Bassolé (born 1972), Ivorian footballer
