= Soumaila Traoré =

Malian footballer

Personal information
- Date of birth: 4 January 1973 (age 53)
- Place of birth: Bamako, Mali

International career
Years	Team	Apps	(Gls)
1993–1994	Mali	7	(3)

Soumaila Traoré (born 4 January 1973) is a Malian footballer. He played in seven matches for the Mali national football team in 1993 to 1994. He was also named in Mali's squad for the 1994 African Cup of Nations tournament.
