= Mobido Sidibé =

Malian footballer

Personal information
- Date of birth: 7 January 1970 (age 56)
- Position: Centre-back

International career
Years	Team	Apps	(Gls)
1993–1997	Mali	20	(8)

Mobido Sidibé (born 7 January 1970) is a Malian former footballer who played as a centre-back. He made 20 appearances for the Mali national team from 1993 to 1997. He was also named in Mali's squad for the 1994 African Cup of Nations tournament.
