= 1994 African Cup of Nations =

19th edition of the Africa Cup of Nations

كأس الأمم الإفريقية 1994 Coupe d'Afrique des Nations 1994
- Official tournament poster

Tournament details
- Host country: Tunisia
- Dates: 26 March – 10 April
- Teams: 12
- Venues: 3 (in 2 host cities)

Final positions
- Champions: Nigeria (2nd title)
- Runners-up: Zambia
- Third place: Ivory Coast
- Fourth place: Mali

Tournament statistics
- Matches played: 20
- Goals scored: 44 (2.2 per match)
- Attendance: 267,400 (13,370 per match)
- Top scorer: (Nigeria) Rashidi Yekini (5 goals)
- Best player: (Nigeria) Rashidi Yekini

The 1994 African Cup of Nations, known as the Nescafé 1994 Africa Cup of Nations for sponsorship purposes, was the 19th edition of the African Cup of Nations, the biennial international men's football championship of Africa organised by the Confederation of African Football (CAF). The tournament was played between 26 March and 10 April 1994 in Tunisia, replacing original hosts Zaire and taking place in the country for the second time following the 1965 edition. The Zambian team was notably recently formed, following an air disaster in which eighteen players and several staff members of the previous team had been killed.

The defending champions were the Ivory Coast, having won the 1992 edition. As title holders, they alongside host country Tunisia automatically qualified for the final phase of the tournament. As in the 1992 edition, twelve teams, divided into four groups each comprising three teams, took part in the competition. Hosts Tunisia would be eliminated in the group stage, while defending champions Ivory Coast were eliminated in the semi-finals after losing on penalties to Nigeria.

Nigeria won the title for the second time in their history, defeating Zambia 2–1 in the final, with a brace scored by Emmanuel Amunike. The Ivory Coast secured third place after beating Mali in the bronze medal match, which placed them fourth. Nigerian Rashidi Yekini won the top scorer award with five goals, and was also named player of the tournament. As winners, Nigeria qualified for the 1995 King Fahd Cup in Saudi Arabia, as a representative of the African continent.

== Teams ==
Ten spots were distributed to the 37 countries participating in qualification. Tunisia, the tournament hosts, and the Ivory Coast, the defending champions, were exempt from the qualifying tournament. After a preliminary round played in two-way matches involving four teams (two qualified for the main round), the teams were divided into eight groups of four. The winners of each group, as well as the second-placed teams in groups of five or six, qualified for the final tournament in Tunisia. In addition to the withdrawals during the qualifying competition of Togo, Chad, Tanzania and Burkina Faso, the teams of Mauritania and Libya, which initially registered, withdrew before the start of qualification.

Cape Verde notably made their debut in official international competition, being eliminated in the preliminary round, and this was also the first participation by South Africa since being banned from world football due to the establishment of apartheid. The end of South Africa's segregationist policy allowed the reintegration of Bafana Bafana into the CAF.

=== Qualified teams ===
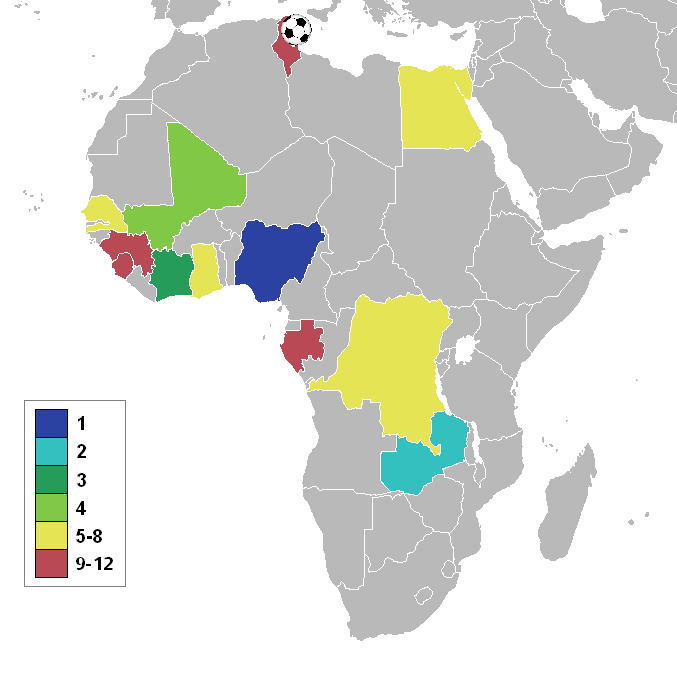
Participating nations

The following twelve teams qualified for the final tournament.

Team	Qualified as	Qualified on	Previous appearances in tournament (Note: Bold indicates champion for that year, Italic indicates host.)
Tunisia	Hosts		5 (1962, 1963, 1965, 1978, 1982)
Ivory Coast	Holders	26 January 1992	10 (1965, 1968, 1970, 1974, 1980, 1984, 1986, 1988, 1990, **1992**)
Nigeria	Group 2 winners	24 July 1993	9 (1963, 1976, 1978, **1980**, 1982, 1984, 1988, 1990, 1992)
Egypt	Group 8 runners-up	25 July 1993	13 (**1957**, **1959**, 1962, 1963, 1970, 1974, 1976, 1980, 1984, **1986**, 1988, 1990, 1992)
Gabon	Group 1 winners	25 July 1993	0 (debut)
Ghana	Group 7 winners	25 July 1993	9 (**1963**, **1965**, 1968, 1970, **1978**, 1980, **1982**, 1984, 1992)
Mali	Group 8 winners	25 July 1993	1 (1972)
Senegal (Note: Senegal replaced Algeria (disqualified).)	Group 3 third place	25 July 1993	5 (1965, 1968, 1986, 1990, 1992)
Zaire	Group 4 winners	25 July 1993	8 (1965, **1968**, 1970, 1972, **1974**, 1976, 1988, 1992)
Zambia	Group 5 winners	25 July 1993	6 (1974, 1978, 1982, 1986, 1990, 1992)
Sierra Leone	Group 3 winners	26 July 1993	0 (debut)
Guinea	Group 6 winners	24 October 1993	4 (1970, 1974, 1976, 1980)

== Venues ==
Tunis	1994 African Cup of Nations is located in Tunisia
El Menzah Stadium	1994 African Cup of Nations is located in Tunisia
Capacity: 45,000	1994 African Cup of Nations is located in Tunisia
Tunis	1994 African Cup of Nations is located in Tunisia
Chedly Zouiten Stadium	1994 African Cup of Nations is located in Tunisia
Capacity: 18,000	1994 African Cup of Nations is located in Tunisia
Sousse	1994 African Cup of Nations is located in Tunisia
Sousse Olympic Stadium	1994 African Cup of Nations is located in Tunisia
Capacity: 21,000	1994 African Cup of Nations is located in Tunisia

== Group stage ==
=== Tiebreakers ===
If two or more teams finished level on points after completion of the group matches, the following tie-breakers were used to determine the final ranking:

1. Greatest total goal difference in the three group matches
2. Greatest number of goals scored in the three group matches
3. Most points earned in matches against other teams in the tie
4. Greatest goal difference in matches against other teams in the tie
5. Greatest number of goals scored in matches against other teams in the tie
6. Drawing of lots

=== Group A ===
Pos	Team	Pld	W	D	L	GF	GA	GD	Pts	Qualification
1	Zaire	2	1	1	0	2	1	+1	4	Advance to Knockout stage
2	Mali	2	1	0	1	2	1	+1	3	Advance to Knockout stage
3	Tunisia (H)	2	0	1	1	1	3	−2	1	

Rules for classification: Group stage tiebreakers
(H) Hosts
26 March 1994

Tunisia	0–2	Mali
	Report	Coulibaly 25'; Sidibé 34'

El Menzah Stadium, Tunis
Attendance: 45,000
Referee: Lim Kee Chong (Mauritius)

28 March 1994

Mali	0–1	Zaire
	Report	Basaula 48'

El Menzah Stadium, Tunis
Attendance: 8,000
Referee: Ali Bujsaim (United Arab Emirates)

30 March 1994

Tunisia	1–1	Zaire
Rouissi 43' (pen.)	Report	Ngoy 55'

El Menzah Stadium, Tunis
Attendance: 45,000
Referee: Jamal Al-Sharif (Syria)

=== Group B ===
Pos	Team	Pld	W	D	L	GF	GA	GD	Pts	Qualification
1	Egypt	2	1	1	0	4	0	+4	4	Advance to Knockout stage
2	Nigeria	2	1	1	0	3	0	+3	4	Advance to Knockout stage
3	Gabon	2	0	0	2	0	7	−7	0	

Rules for classification: Group stage tiebreakers
26 March 1994

Nigeria	3–0	Gabon
Yekini 18', 88'; Adepoju 72'	Report

El Menzah Stadium, Tunis
Attendance: 30,000
Referee: Mohamed Bahar (Morocco)

28 March 1994

Egypt	4–0	Gabon
Mansour 1'; El-Gamal 22'; Abdel Samad 55', 59'	Report

Chedly Zouiten Stadium, Tunis
Attendance: 6,000
Referee: Charles Masembe (Uganda)

30 March 1994

Nigeria	0–0	Egypt
	Report

El Menzah Stadium, Tunis
Attendance: 30,000
Referee: Lim Kee Chong (Mauritius)

=== Group C ===
Pos	Team	Pld	W	D	L	GF	GA	GD	Pts	Qualification
1	Zambia	2	1	1	0	1	0	+1	4	Advance to Knockout stage
2	Ivory Coast	2	1	0	1	4	1	+3	3	Advance to Knockout stage
3	Sierra Leone	2	0	1	1	0	4	−4	1	

Rules for classification: Group stage tiebreakers
27 March 1994

Ivory Coast	4–0	Sierra Leone
Tiéhi 19', 63', 70'; Guel 35'	Report

Sousse Olympic Stadium, Sousse
Attendance: 10,000
Referee: Jamal Al-Sharif (Syria)

29 March 1994

Zambia	0–0	Sierra Leone
	Report

Sousse Olympic Stadium, Sousse
Attendance: 6,000
Referee: Omer Yengo (Congo)

31 March 1994

Zambia	1–0	Ivory Coast
Malitoli 79'	Report

Sousse Olympic Stadium, Sousse
Attendance: 6,000
Referee: Petros Mathabela (South Africa)

=== Group D ===
Pos	Team	Pld	W	D	L	GF	GA	GD	Pts	Qualification
1	Ghana	2	2	0	0	2	0	+2	6	Advance to Knockout stage
2	Senegal	2	1	0	1	2	2	0	3	Advance to Knockout stage
3	Guinea	2	0	0	2	1	3	−2	0	

Rules for classification: Group stage tiebreakers
27 March 1994

Ghana	1–0	Guinea
Akunnor 87'	Report

Sousse Olympic Stadium, Sousse
Attendance: 10,000
Referee: Petros Mathabela (South Africa)

29 March 1994

Senegal	2–1	Guinea
Gueye 46' (pen.); Tendeng 50'	Report	A. Camara 44'

Sousse Olympic Stadium, Sousse
Attendance: 6,000
Referee: Hussein Ali Moussa (Egypt)

31 March 1994

Ghana	1–0	Senegal
Polley 42'	Report

Sousse Olympic Stadium, Sousse
Attendance: 6,000
Referee: Ali Bujsaim (United Arab Emirates)

== Knockout stage ==
=== Bracket ===
Quarter-finals
2 April – Tunis
Zaire	0
Nigeria	2
3 April – Sousse
Ghana	1
Ivory Coast	2
2 April – Tunis
Egypt	0
Mali	1
3 April – Sousse
Zambia	1
Senegal	0

Semi-finals
6 April – Tunis
Nigeria (p)	2 (4)
Ivory Coast	2 (2)
6 April – Tunis
Mali	0
Zambia	4

Final
10 April – Tunis
Nigeria	2
Zambia	1
Third place
10 April – Tunis
Ivory Coast	3
Mali	1

=== Quarter-finals ===
2 April 1994

Zaire	0–2	Nigeria
	Report	Yekini 51', 71' (pen.)

El Menzah Stadium, Tunis
Attendance: 1,000
Referee: Lim Kee Chong (Mauritius)

2 April 1994

Egypt	0–1	Mali
	Report	S. Traoré 64'

El Menzah Stadium, Tunis
Attendance: 1,400
Referee: Charles Masembe (Uganda)

3 April 1994

Zambia	1–0	Senegal
Sakala 38'	Report

Sousse Olympic Stadium, Sousse
Attendance: 4,000
Referee: Jamal Al-Sharif (Syria)

3 April 1994

Ghana	1–2	Ivory Coast
Akonnor 77'	Report	Tiéhi 30'; A. Traoré 81'

Sousse Olympic Stadium, Sousse
Attendance: 8,000
Referee: Ali Bujsaim (United Arab Emirates)

=== Semi-finals ===
6 April 1994

Nigeria	2–2 (a.e.t.)	Ivory Coast
Iroha 26'; Yekini 40'	Report	Bassolé 19', 31'
Penalties
Finidi (penalty scored); Siasia (penalty missed); Amokachi (penalty scored); Iroha (penalty scored); Yekini (penalty scored)	4–2	(penalty scored) Kouamé; (penalty scored) Fallet; (penalty missed) Bassolé; (penalty missed) Amani

El Menzah Stadium, Tunis
Attendance: 3,000
Referee: Ali Bujsaim (United Arab Emirates)

6 April 1994

Zambia	4–0	Mali
Litana 8'; Saileti 30'; K. Bwalya 47'; Malitoli 73'	Report

El Menzah Stadium, Tunis
Attendance: 2,000
Referee: Charles Masembe (Uganda)

=== Third place match ===
10 April 1994

Ivory Coast	3–1	Mali
Koné 2'; Ouattara 67'; Sie 70'	Report	Diallo 46'

El Menzah Stadium, Tunis
Attendance: 15,000
Referee: Petros Mathabela (South Africa)

=== Final ===
10 April 1994

Nigeria	2–1	Zambia
Amuneke 5', 47'	Report	Litana 3'

El Menzah Stadium, Tunis
Attendance: 25,000
Referee: Lim Kee Chong (Mauritius)

== Goalscorers ==
There were 44 goals scored in 20 matches, for an average of 2.2 goals per match.

5 goals

- (Nigeria) Rashidi Yekini

4 goals

- (Ivory Coast) Joël Tiéhi

2 goals

- (Egypt) Bashir Abdel Samad
- (Ghana) Charles Akonnor
- (Ivory Coast) Michel Bassolé
- (Nigeria) Emmanuel Amuneke
- (Zambia) Elijah Litana
- (Zambia) Kenneth Malitoli

1 goal

- (Egypt) Hamza El-Gamal
- (Egypt) Ayman Mansour
- (Ghana) Prince Polley
- (Guinea) Aboubacar Titi Camara
- (Ivory Coast) Tchiressoua Guel
- (Ivory Coast) Adama Koné Clofie
- (Ivory Coast) Ahmed Ouattara
- (Ivory Coast) Donald-Olivier Sie
- (Ivory Coast) Abdoulaye Traoré
- (Mali) Fernand Coulibaly
- (Mali) Amadou Diallo
- (Mali) Mobido Sidibé
- (Mali) Soumaila Traoré
- (Nigeria) Mutiu Adepoju
- (Nigeria) Ben Iroha
- (Senegal) Momath Gueye
- (Senegal) Athanas Tendeng
- (Tunisia) Faouzi Rouissi
- (Zaire) Lemba Basaula
- (Zaire) Nsumbu Ngoy
- (Zambia) Kalusha Bwalya
- (Zambia) Zeddy Saileti
- (Zambia) Evans Sakala

== Team of the Tournament ==
Goalkeeper

- (Egypt) Ahmed Shobair

Defenders

- (Ghana) Frank Amankwah
- (Zambia) Harrison Chongo
- (Zambia) Elijah Litana
- (Nigeria) Benedict Iroha

Midfielders

- (Ivory Coast) Serge-Alain Maguy
- (Nigeria) Jay-Jay Okocha
- (Nigeria) Daniel Amokachi
- (Ghana) Abedi Pele

Forwards

- (Ivory Coast) Joël Tiéhi
- (Nigeria) Rashidi Yekini
