= Adama Koné Clofie =

Ivorian footballer

Personal information
- Date of birth: 3 November 1967 (age 58)
- Position: Midfielder

International career
| Years | Team | Apps | (Gls) |
| 1993–2000 | Ivory Coast | 13 | (2) |

Adama Koné Clofie (born 3 November 1967) is an Ivorian footballer. He played in 13 matches for the Ivory Coast national football team from 1993 to 2000. He was also named in Ivory Coast's squad for the 1994 African Cup of Nations tournament.
