= Atanas Tendeng =

Senegalese footballer

Personal information
- Date of birth: 23 June 1970 (age 56)

International career
Years	Team	Apps	(Gls)
1993–1994	Senegal	7	(2)

Atanas Tendeng (born 23 June 1970) is a Senegalese footballer. He played in seven matches for the Senegal national football team from 1993 to 1994. He was also named in Senegal's squad for the 1994 African Cup of Nations tournament.
