= Adam Mekki (footballer, born 2002) =

Finnish footballer (born 2002)

Personal information
- Full name: Adam Bilal Mekki
- Date of birth: 31 March 2002 (age 24)
- Place of birth: Rovaniemi, Finland
- Height: 1.83 m (6 ft 0 in)
- Position: Left winger

Team information
- Current team: RoPS
- Number: 10

Youth career
- –2019: RoPS

Senior career*
Years	Team	Apps	(Gls)
2019–2020	RoPS II	10	(1)
2021	Savoia	2	(0)
2021	Giugliano	3	(0)
2022–2023	SJK II	32	(2)
2022	→ JBK (loan)	5	(3)
2024	SalPa	3	(0)
2025–	RoPS	52	(32)
- * Club domestic league appearances and goals as of 20 October 2026

Adam Bilal Mekki (born 31 March 2002) is a Finnish professional footballer who plays as a left winger for RoPS.

== Personal life ==
Born and raised in Finland, Mekki is of Finnish and Algerian descent.
