= Molobaly Sissoko =

Malian football manager (1945–2019)

Personal information
- Date of birth: 1 January 1945
- Place of birth: Kati, Mali
- Date of death: 22 November 2019 (aged 74)

Managerial career
- Years: Team
- 1984–1986: Stade Malien
- 1986–1989: Real Bamako
- 1989–1993: Mali
- ‡ National team caps and goals as of 00:11, 26 March 2021 (UTC)

Molobaly "Molo" Sissoko (1 January 1945 – 22 November 2019) was a Malian football manager who managed Stade Malien, Real Bamako and the Mali national team.

== Managerial career ==
Sissoko was a PE teacher from 1971 to 1972, before studying in Dakar to become a trainer. He helped train in France with FC Epinay and managed his town hall until 1979. In 1982, he returned to Mali and opened a football academy. In 1984, he was approached to manage the Malian club Stade Malien, and then Real Bamako. Altogether he won the Malian Cup three times. He became manager of the Mali national team, and after his stint in 1993 he was the technical director for the team.

== Death ==
Sissoko died of illness in his hometown Kati, Mali on 22 November 2019.
