= Vilasco Fallet =

Ivorian footballer

Personal information
- Date of birth: 27 January 1969 (age 57)
- Position: Defender

International career
Years	Team	Apps	(Gls)
1990–1994	Ivory Coast	13	(0)

Vilasco Fallet (born 27 January 1969) is an Ivorian footballer. He played in 13 matches for the Ivory Coast national football team from 1990 to 1994. He was also named in Ivory Coast's squad for the 1994 African Cup of Nations tournament.
