= Rovaniemen Palloseura =

Finnish football club

RoPS
- Full name: Rovaniemen Palloseura
- Founded: 1950; 76 years ago
- Ground: Keskuskenttä, Rovaniemi
- Capacity: 2,803
- Chairman: Matti Poikajärvi
- Manager: Jari Alamäki
- League: Ykkösliiga
- 2026: Ykkönen, 2nd of 12 (promoted via play-offs)
- Website: www.rops.fi
| Home colours | Away colours |

Rovaniemen Palloseura (RoPS) is a football club founded in 1950 and based in Rovaniemi, Finland. RoPS played in the Finnish Premier Division, (Veikkausliiga) for 32 years, from 1981 to 2021. In 2021, RoPS withdrew from professional football and voluntarily relegated to the amateur Kakkonen division. The club plays home games at the Rovaniemen Keskuskenttä in the Arctic Circle of Lapland.

== History ==
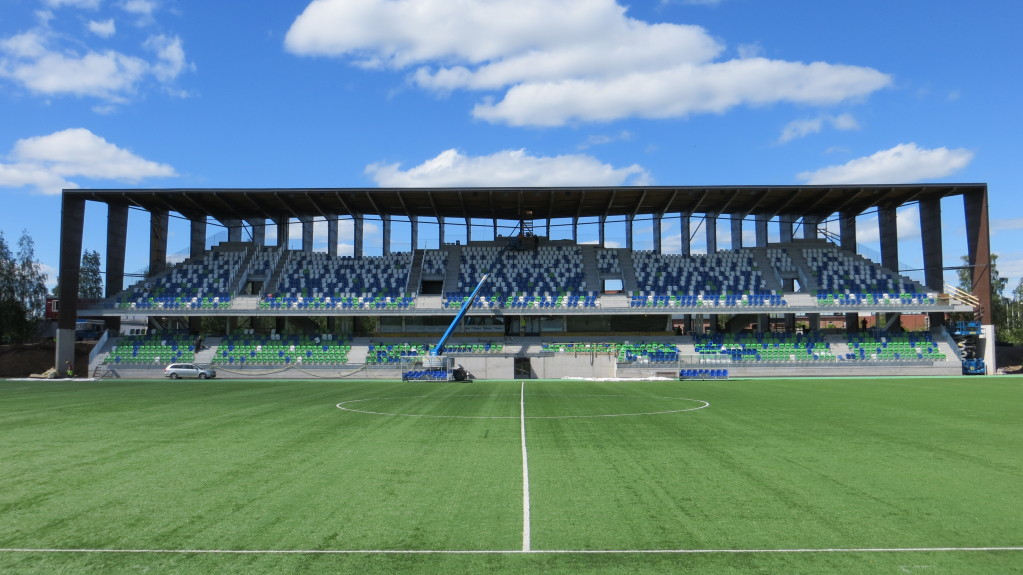
Keskuskenttä, home ground of RoPS

RoPS have won the Finnish Cup on two occasions, in 1986 and 2013, and were runners-up in 1962. They placed third in the Finnish Premier Division in 1988 and 1989, before finishing as runner-up in 2015, losing out on the title by 1 point to eventual champions SJK. The club's most notable international achievement was reaching the quarter-finals of the European Cup-Winners' Cup in 1987–88 against Marseille.

=== Match fixing allegations and scandal ===
Throughout the 2000s, RoPS became infamous for suspected involvement in match fixing.

In spring 2011 the Finnish National Bureau of Investigation started a large investigation into match fixing. On February 25 Singaporean businessman Wilson Raj Perumal, a convicted match fixer, was arrested after entering Finland with a fake passport. The National Bureau of Investigation suspected that over 30 games between 2008 and 2011, mostly from the Finnish premier league, had been fixed or manipulated.

On July 19, 2011, the Rovaniemi Court of Appeal convicted Perumal and nine RoPS players of match-fixing. Altogether 24 games had been manipulated, and the intended score had been achieved in 11 of them. Perumal was sentenced to two years in prison and ordered to return 150,000 euros deemed to be match-fixing profits. The bribes ranged from 500 euros offered to one player to a total of 80,000 euros offered to eight players. The highest total of bribes for one individual was slightly over 40,000 euros. The players received suspended sentences. The sentenced players were six Zambian and two Georgian players: Godfrey Chibanga, Chileshe Chibwe, Francis Kombe, Stephen Kunda, Christopher Musonda, Chanda Mwaba, Nchimunya Mweetwa, Pavle Khorguashvili, and Valter Khorguashvili.

=== Domestic history ===
Season to season of RoPS

| Season | Level | Division | Section | Administration | Position | Movements | Finnish Cup | League Cup |
|---|---|---|---|---|---|---|---|---|
| 1955 | Tier 4 | Piirinsarja (District League) | | Finnish FA (Suomen Pallolitto) | Qualifiers for 3rd Tier | | | |
| 1956 | Tier 4 | Aluesarja (Area Division) | Group 12 Lapland | Finnish FA (Suomen Pallolitto) | 1st | Promoted | | |
| 1957 | Tier 3 | Maakuntasarja (Regional League) | North Group II | Finnish FA (Suomen Pallolitto) | 5th | | | |
| 1958 | Tier 3 | Maakuntasarja (Regional League) | Group 9 Northern Finland | Finnish FA (Suomen Pallolitto) | 3rd | | | |
| 1959 | Tier 3 | Maakuntasarja (Regional League) | Group 9 Northern Finland | Finnish FA (Suomen Pallolitto) | 1st | Promoted | | |
| 1960 | Tier 2 | Suomensarja (Finland Series) | North Group | Finnish FA (Suomen Pallolitto) | 11th | Relegated | | |
| 1961 | Tier 3 | Maakuntasarja (Regional League) | Group 9 Northern Finland | Finnish FA (Suomen Pallolitto) | 2nd | | | |
| 1962 | Tier 3 | Maakuntasarja (Regional League) | Group 9 Northern Finland | Finnish FA (Suomen Pallolitto) | 1st | Promoted | | |
| 1963 | Tier 2 | Suomensarja (Finland Series) | North Group | Finnish FA (Suomen Pallolitto) | 8th | | | |
| 1964 | Tier 2 | Suomensarja (Finland Series) | North Group | Finnish FA (Suomen Pallolitto) | 10th | Relegated | | |
| 1965 | Tier 3 | Maakuntasarja (Regional League) | Group 9 Northern Finland | Finnish FA (Suomen Pallolitto) | 5th | | | |
| 1966 | Tier 3 | Maakuntasarja (Regional League) | Group 9 Northern Finland | Finnish FA (Suomen Pallolitto) | 3rd | | | |
| 1967 | Tier 3 | Maakuntasarja (Regional League) | Group 10 Northern Finland | Finnish FA (Suomen Pallolitto) | 2nd | | | |
| 1968 | Tier 3 | Maakuntasarja (Regional League) | Group 8 Northern Finland | Finnish FA (Suomen Pallolitto) | 1st | Promoted | | |
| 1969 | Tier 2 | Suomensarja (Finland Series) | North Group | Finnish FA (Suomen Pallolitto) | 10th | Relegated | | |
| 1970 | Tier 3 | 3. Divisioona (Third Division) | Group 8 Northern Finland | Finnish FA (Suomen Pallolitto) | 1st | Promoted | | |
| 1971 | Tier 2 | 2. Divisioona (Second Division) | North Group | Finnish FA (Suomen Pallolitto) | 9th | | | |
| 1972 | Tier 2 | 2. Divisioona (Second Division) | North Group | Finnish FA (Suomen Pallolitto) | 11th | Relegated | | |
| 1973 | Tier 4 | 3. Divisioona (Third Division) | Group 9 Northern Finland | Finnish FA (Suomen Pallolitto) | 1st | Promoted | | |
| 1974 | Tier 3 | 2. Divisioona (Second Division) | North Group | Finnish FA (Suomen Pallolitto) | 3rd | | | |
| 1975 | Tier 3 | 2. Divisioona (Second Division) | North Group | Finnish FA (Suomen Pallolitto) | 2nd | | | |
| 1976 | Tier 3 | 2. Divisioona (Second Division) | North Group | Finnish FA (Suomen Pallolitto) | 2nd | | | |
| 1977 | Tier 3 | 2. Divisioona (Second Division) | North Group | Finnish FA (Suomen Pallolitto) | 9th | | | |
| 1978 | Tier 3 | 2. Divisioona (Second Division) | North Group | Finnish FA (Suomen Pallolitto) | 1st | Promoted | | |
| 1979 | Tier 2 | 1. Divisioona (First Division) | | Finnish FA (Suomen Pallolitto) | 6th | | | |
| 1980 | Tier 2 | 1. Divisioona (First Division) | | Finnish FA (Suomen Pallolitto) | 2nd | Promotion/Relagtion Group 2nd - Promoted | | |
| 1981 | Tier 1 | SM-Sarja (Premier League) | | Finnish FA (Suomen Pallolitto) | 10th | Promotion/Relagtion Group 5th - Relegated | | |
| 1982 | Tier 2 | 1. Divisioona (First Division) | | Finnish FA (Suomen Pallolitto) | 2nd | Promotion/Relagtion Group 1st - Promoted | | |
| 1983 | Tier 1 | SM-Sarja (Premier League) | | Finnish FA (Suomen Pallolitto) | 8th | | | |
| 1984 | Tier 1 | SM-Sarja (Premier League) | | Finnish FA (Suomen Pallolitto) | 6th | | | |
| 1985 | Tier 1 | SM-Sarja (Premier League) | | Finnish FA (Suomen Pallolitto) | 7th | | | |
| 1986 | Tier 1 | SM-Sarja (Premier League) | | Finnish FA (Suomen Pallolitto) | 4th | | | |
| 1987 | Tier 1 | SM-Sarja (Premier League) | | Finnish FA (Suomen Pallolitto) | 5th | | | |
| 1988 | Tier 1 | SM-Sarja (Premier League) | | Finnish FA (Suomen Pallolitto) | 3rd | | | |
| 1989 | Tier 1 | SM-Sarja (Premier League) | | Finnish FA (Suomen Pallolitto) | 3rd | | | |
| 1990 | Tier 1 | Futisliiga (Premier League) | | Finnish FA (Suomen Pallolitto) | 2nd Championship Playoff - Quarter-finals | | | |
| 1991 | Tier 1 | Veikkausliiga (Premier League) | | Finnish FA (Suomen Pallolitto) | 7th | | | |
| 1992 | Tier 1 | Veikkausliiga (Premier League) | | Finnish FA (Suomen Pallolitto) | 7th | | | |
| 1993 | Tier 1 | Veikkausliiga (Premier League) | | Finnish FA (Suomen Pallolitto) | 7th | | Runners-up | |
| 1994 | Tier 1 | Veikkausliiga (Premier League) | | Finnish FA (Suomen Pallolitto) | 5th | | | |
| 1995 | Tier 1 | Veikkausliiga (Premier League) | | Finnish FA (Suomen Pallolitto) | 9th | | 9th Round | |
| 1996 | Tier 1 | Veikkausliiga (Premier League) | | Finnish FA (Suomen Pallolitto) | 9th - Relegation Group 2nd | | 7th Round | |
| 1997 | Tier 1 | Veikkausliiga (Premier League) | | Finnish FA (Suomen Pallolitto) | 6th | | Semi-finals | |
| 1998 | Tier 1 | Veikkausliiga (Premier League) | | Finnish FA (Suomen Pallolitto) | 8th | | | |
| 1999 | Tier 1 | Veikkausliiga (Premier League) | | Finnish FA (Suomen Pallolitto) | 8th | | 7th Round | |
| 2000 | Tier 1 | Veikkausliiga (Premier League) | | Finnish FA (Suomen Pallolitto) | 9th | | | |
| 2001 | Tier 1 | Veikkausliiga (Premier League) | | Finnish FA (Suomen Pallolitto) | 12th | Relegated | 6th Round | |
| 2002 | Tier 2 | Ykkönen (First Division) | Northern Group | Finnish FA (Suomen Pallolitto) | 5th | | Quarter-finals | |
| 2003 | Tier 2 | Ykkönen (First Division) | | Finnish FA (Suomen Pallolitto) | 2nd | Promotion Playoff - Promoted | 6th Round | |
| 2004 | Tier 1 | Veikkausliiga (Premier League) | | Finnish FA (Suomen Pallolitto) | 12th | | Quarter-finals | |
| 2005 | Tier 1 | Veikkausliiga (Premier League) | | Finnish FA (Suomen Pallolitto) | 13th | Relegation Playoff - Relegated | | |
| 2006 | Tier 2 | Ykkönen (First Division) | | Finnish FA (Suomen Pallolitto) | 7th | | | |
| 2007 | Tier 2 | Ykkönen (First Division) | | Finnish FA (Suomen Pallolitto) | 2nd | Promotion Playoff - Promoted | | |
| 2008 | Tier 1 | Veikkausliiga (Premier League) | | Finnish FA (Suomen Pallolitto) | 10th | | 6th Round | |
| 2009 | Tier 1 | Veikkausliiga (Premier League) | | Finnish FA (Suomen Pallolitto) | 14th | Relegated | 6th Round | |
| 2010 | Tier 2 | Ykkönen (First Division) | | Finnish FA (Suomen Pallolitto) | 1st | Promoted | 4th Round | |
| 2011 | Tier 1 | Veikkausliiga (Premier League) | | Finnish FA (Suomen Pallolitto) | 12th | Relegated | 5th Round | |
| 2012 | Tier 2 | Ykkönen (First Division) | | Finnish FA (Suomen Pallolitto) | 1st | Promoted | 5th Round | |
| 2013 | Tier 1 | Veikkausliiga (Premier League) | | Finnish FA (Suomen Pallolitto) | 11th | | Winners | |
| 2014 | Tier 1 | Veikkausliiga (Premier League) | | Finnish FA (Suomen Pallolitto) | 9th | | 6th Round | |
| 2015 | Tier 1 | Veikkausliiga (Premier League) | | Finnish FA (Suomen Pallolitto) | 2nd | | 6th Round | |
| 2016 | Tier 1 | Veikkausliiga (Premier League) | | Finnish FA (Suomen Pallolitto) | 6th | | 6th Round | |
| 2017 | Tier 1 | Veikkausliiga (Premier League) | | Finnish FA (Suomen Pallolitto) | 7th | | Group Stage - 2nd - Quarter-final Qualifiers | |
| 2018 | Tier 1 | Veikkausliiga (Premier League) | | Finnish FA (Suomen Pallolitto) | 2nd | | Group Stage - 3rd | |
| 2019 | Tier 1 | Veikkausliiga (Premier League) | | Finnish FA (Suomen Pallolitto) | 10th | | Group Stage - 4th - Quarter-finals | |
| 2020 | Tier 1 | Veikkausliiga (Premier League) | | Finnish FA (Suomen Pallolitto) | 12th | Relegated | Group Stage - 6th | |
| 2021 | Tier 2 | Ykkönen (First Division) | | Finnish FA (Suomen Pallolitto) | 2nd | Promotion Playoff. Gave up league spot due to financial difficulties | Group Stage - 2nd | |
| 2022 | Tier 3 | Kakkonen (Second Division) | Group C | Finnish FA (Suomen Pallolitto) | 6th | | 4th Round | |
| 2023 | Tier 3 | Kakkonen (Second Division) | Group C | Finnish FA (Suomen Pallolitto) | 3rd | Qualifiers for Ykkönen - Qualified | 4th Round | |
| 2024 | Tier 3 | Ykkönen (First Division) | | Finnish FA (Suomen Pallolitto) | 5th | | 3rd Round | |
| 2025 | Tier 3 | Ykkönen (First Division) | | Finnish FA (Suomen Pallolitto) | | | | |

- 32 seasons in Veikkausliiga
- 16 seasons in Ykkösliiga
- 19 seasons in Ykkönen
- 3 seasons in 4th Tier

=== European history ===
| Season | Competition | Round | Club | Home | Away | Aggregate |
|---|---|---|---|---|---|---|
| 1987–88 | Cup Winners' Cup | 1R | (Northern Ireland) Glentoran | 0–0 | 1–1 | 1–1(a) |
| 1987–88 | Cup Winners' Cup | 2R | (Albania) Vllaznia | 1–0 | 1–0 | 2–0 |
| 1987–88 | Cup Winners' Cup | QF | (France) Marseille | 0–1 | 0–3 | 0–4 |
| 1989–90 | UEFA Cup | 1R | (Poland) GKS Katowice | 1–1 | 1–0 | 2–1 |
| 1989–90 | UEFA Cup | 2R | (France) Auxerre | 0–5 | 0–3 | 0–8 |
| 1990–91 | UEFA Cup | 1R | (East Germany) 1. FC Magdeburg | 0–1 | 0–0 | 0–1 |
| 2014–15 | UEFA Europa League | 2Q | (Greece) Asteras Tripolis | 1–1 | 2–4 | 3–5 |
| 2016–17 | UEFA Europa League | 1Q | (Republic of Ireland) Shamrock Rovers | 1–1 | 2–0 | 3–1 |
| 2016–17 | UEFA Europa League | 2Q | (Croatia) Lokomotiva | 1–1 | 0–3 | 1–4 |
| 2019–20 | UEFA Europa League | 1Q | (Scotland) Aberdeen | 1–2 | 1–2 | 2–4 |

Notes

- 1R: First round
- 2R: Second round
- 1Q: First qualifying round
- QF: Quarter-finals

== Honours ==
- Finnish Cup
  - Champions (2): 1986, 2013
- Ykkönen
  - Champions (2): 2010, 2012

== Current squad ==
As of 1 September 2026

Note: Flags indicate national team as defined under FIFA eligibility rules; some limited exceptions apply. Players may hold more than one non-FIFA nationality.

| No. | Pos. | Nation | Player |
|---|---|---|---|
| 1 | GK | FIN | Tino Korhonen |
| 2 | DF | FIN | Aamos Oinas |
| 4 | DF | FIN | Jonne Koistinen |
| 7 | FW | FIN | Valtteri Vatanen |
| 8 | MF | FIN | Kimi Isometsä |
| 9 | FW | FIN | Onni Suutari |
| 10 | FW | FIN | Adam Mekki |
| 11 | FW | FIN | Tomas Varhi |
| 12 | GK | FIN | Mikko Rantala |
| 13 | DF | FIN | Topias Listo |
| 14 | MF | CAN | Rodane Cato |
| 16 | DF | FIN | Joel Niska |
| 18 | DF | FIN | Lloyd Ojo |

| No. | Pos. | Nation | Player |
|---|---|---|---|
| 19 | MF | FIN | Turkka Katermaa |
| 20 | FW | FIN | Simo Roiha |
| 22 | FW | FIN | Aapo Savolainen |
| 23 | MF | GER | Finn Heiserholt |
| 25 | DF | FIN | Arttu Leppänen |
| 27 | MF | FIN | Oliver Wimmer |
| 28 | DF | FIN | Veeti Katermaa |
| 29 | MF | FIN | Miika Korhonen |
| 30 | GK | NIR | Dylan Berry |
| 34 | DF | NED | Boy Nijgh |
| 35 | MF | FIN | Veeti Mäntymäki |
| 77 | MF | CAN | Shameiks McLeod |

== Management and boardroom ==
=== Management ===
As of 18 February 2020.

| Name | Role |
|---|---|
| (Finland) Vesa Tauriainen | Head Coach |
| (Finland) Mika Pulkkinen | Coach |
| (Finland) Jari Alamäki | Fitness Coach |
| (Finland) Ossi Koskela | Goalkeeping Coach |
| (Finland) Tuomas Könönen | Physiotherapist |
| (Finland) Vilma Poutiainen | Physiotherapist |
| (Scotland) David Coull | Kit Manager |
| (Finland) Essi Jokelainen | Masseur |
| (Finland) Olavi Tammimies | Team Manager |

=== Boardroom ===
As of 18 February 2020

| Name | Role |
|---|---|
| (Finland) Risto Niva | Chairman, Managing director |
| (Finland) Pekka Konstenius | Vice chairman |
| (Finland) Jari Ilola | Director of Football |

== Rovaniemi Football Academy ==
Rovaniemi Football Academy (RFA) is the reserve team of RoPS. The team plays in Kakkonen in 2020 season. It is coached by Aleksi Tanner.

As of 14 September 2020

Note: Flags indicate national team as defined under FIFA eligibility rules; some limited exceptions apply. Players may hold more than one non-FIFA nationality.

| No. | Pos. | Nation | Player |
|---|---|---|---|
| 11 | GK | FIN | Lauri Vetri |
| 24 | MF | FIN | Kirill Bullat |
| 30 | GK | FIN | Tino Korhonen |
| 35 | GK | FIN | Pauli Tuisku |
| 36 | MF | FIN | Vertti Hänninen |
| 37 | DF | FIN | Joona Lahdenmäki |
| 36 | MF | FIN | Jonne Länsipää |
| 39 | DF | FIN | Akseli Kantola |
| 40 | MF | FIN | Ville Ojala |
| 40 | FW | FIN | Santeri Matilainen |
| 41 | MF | FIN | Jonne Koistinen |
| 42 | MF | FIN | Riku-Veli Niska |

| No. | Pos. | Nation | Player |
|---|---|---|---|
| 43 | FW | FIN | Joona Kähkönen |
| 44 | DF | FIN | Tuomas Leppäkangas |
| 46 | FW | FIN | Adam Mekki |
| 47 | FW | FIN | Janne Ojaniemi |
| 49 | MF | EGY | Karam Hadhoud |
| 50 | DF | FIN | Severi Salmirinne |
| 52 | DF | FIN | Miska Ylitolva |
| 53 | MF | FIN | Roni Pietsalo |
| 54 | FW | FIN | Antti Salmi |
| 56 | DF | FIN | Luka Kuittinen |
| 57 | DF | FIN | Sampo Ala-Iso |

== Managers ==
- (Poland) Jerzy Masztaler (1990–91)
- (Wales) Graham Williams (1991)
- (Finland) Olavi Tammimies (1992)
- (England) Keith Armstrong (1993–94)
- (Finland) Timo Salmi (1995)
- (Wales) Graham Williams (1995)
- (Finland) Ari Matinlassi (1995)
- (Finland) Ari Rantamaa (1996–97)
- (Finland) Kari Virtanen (1997–99)
- (Finland) Olavi Tammimies (2000)
- (Finland) Mauri Holappa (2001)
- (Finland) Tomi Molin (2002)
- (Hungary) György Hamori (Jan 1, 2003 – June 23, 2004)
- (Finland) Mika Lumijärvi (June 23, 2004 – June 30, 2005)
- (Finland) Matti Vikman (interim) (June 30, 2005 – Dec 31, 2005)
- (Finland) Jukka Ikäläinen (2006)
- (Belgium) Tom Saintfiet (Jan 1, 2008 – April 7, 2008)
- (Estonia) Valeri Bondarenko (April 14, 2008 – May 27, 2009)
- (Finland) Mika Lumijärvi (May 27, 2009 – Oct 6, 2009)
- (Zambia) Zeddy Saileti (Oct 6, 2009 – Dec 31, 2009)
- (Wales) John Allen (Jan 1, 2010 – Aug 9, 2011)
- (Finland) Matti Hiukka (Aug 9, 2011 – Dec 31, 2011)
- (Finland) Kari Virtanen (Jan 1, 2012 – Oct 13)
- (Finland) Juha Malinen (Nov, 2013 – Oct, 2017)
- (Finland) Toni Koskela (Oct, 2017 – May 22, 2019)
- (Finland) Pasi Tuutti (May 22, 2019 – Dec 31, 2019)
- (Finland) Vesa Tauriainen (Jan 1, 2020 – Sep 15, 2020)
- (Finland) Mikko Mannila (Sep 16, 2020 – Dec 31, 2021)
- (Finland) Aleksi Tanner (Jan 1, 2022 – Dec 31, 2022)
- (Finland) Ville Ulanen (Jan 1, 2023 – Dec 31, 2023)
- (Finland) Jari Alamäki (Jan 1, 2024 – )
