= Ngoy Nsumbu =

Congolese footballer (1972–2024)

- Nsumbu with Cappellen in 1996

Personal information
- Date of birth: 30 December 1972
- Place of birth: Kinshasa, Zaire
- Date of death: 5 May 2024 (aged 51)
- Height: 1.73 m (5 ft 8 in)
- Position: Midfielder

Senior career*
Years	Team	Apps	(Gls)
1989–1994	Germinal Ekeren	42	(10)
1994–1995	Waregem	30	(7)
1995–1997	R. Cappellen	57	(27)
1997–2000	Genk	67	(10)
2000–2001	Verbroedering Geel	30	(13)
2001–2004	Maccabi Petah Tikva	65	(9)

International career
1994–2001	DR Congo	8	(1)
- * Club domestic league appearances and goals

Ngoy Nsumbu (30 December 1972 – 5 May 2024) was a Congolese professional footballer who played as a midfielder. He was a squad member of the DR Congo national team at the 1994 Africa Cup of Nations. Nsumbu died due to complications of cancer on 5 May 2024, aged 51.

== Honours ==
Genk

- Belgian First Division: 1998–99
- Belgian Cup: 1997–98
