= Godfrey Chibanga =

Zambian football player (born 1989)

Personal information
- Date of birth: February 16, 1989 (age 37)
- Place of birth: Zambia
- Height: 1.78 m (5 ft 10 in)
- Position: Midfielder

Senior career*
Years	Team	Apps	(Gls)
2009–2010	RoPS	41	(1)
- * Club domestic league appearances and goals as of 29 September 2010

Godfrey Chibanga (born February 16, 1989) is a Zambian former football player. He scored his first league goal with RoPS against Klubi-04 on September 5, 2010.

Chibanga and eight other RoPS players got sacked in the spring of 2011 due to a match fixing scandal.
