= Elijah Litana =

Zambian footballer (born 1970)

Personal information
- Date of birth: 5 December 1970 (age 55)
- Place of birth: Zambia
- Height: 1.85 m (6 ft 1 in)
- Position: Defender

Senior career*
Years	Team	Apps	(Gls)
–1995	Roan United		
1995–2000	Al-Hilal		

International career
1993–2000	Zambia	31	(3)
- * Club domestic league appearances and goals

Elijah Litana (born 5 December 1970) is a Zambian former professional footballer who played as a defender. He was part of the Zambia national team that reached the final in the 1994 African Nations Cup.

Litana spent five seasons with Al-Hilal, helping the club win the 1995–96 Saudi Premier League. He was sidelined from playing football after a firearm accident in July 2000.
