= Rashidi Yekini =

Nigerian footballer (1963–2012)

Personal information
- Date of birth: 23 October 1963
- Place of birth: Kaduna, Nigeria
- Date of death: 4 May 2012 (aged 48)
- Place of death: Ibadan, Nigeria
- Position: Forward

Senior career*
Years	Team	Apps	(Gls)
1981–1982	UNTL Kaduna		
1982–1984	Shooting Stars	53	(45)
1984–1987	Abiola Babes		
1987–1990	Africa Sports		
1990–1994	Vitória Setúbal	114	(91)
1994–1995	Olympiacos	4	(2)
1995–1996	Sporting Gijón	14	(3)
1997	Vitória Setúbal	14	(3)
1997–1998	Zürich	28	(14)
1998–1999	CA Bizertin		
1999	Al Shabab		
1999–2002	Africa Sports		
2002–2003	Julius Berger		
2005	Gateway United	26	(7)
Total		253	(165)

International career
1983–1998	Nigeria	62	(37)
Medal record
Men's football
Representing Nigeria
Africa Cup of Nations
Winner	1994 Tunisia
Second place	1984 Ivory Coast
Second place	1988 Morocco
Second place	1990 Algeria
Third place	1992 Senegal
- * Club domestic league appearances and goals

Rashidi Yekini (23 October 1963 – 4 May 2012) was a Nigerian professional footballer who played as a forward. Yekini is widely regarded as one of the greatest Nigerian footballers of all time and one of the greatest players from the continent of Africa. Powerful, fast, and clinical in front of goal. His emotional World Cup celebration became one of the most iconic moments in Nigerian sports history. He was known by his Nigerian team mates and fans as "The Goals Father", he scored more than 480 goals in over 670 games in his career.

Yekini scored 37 goals in international matches and represented Nigeria in seven football tournaments, including two World Cups, where he scored the country's first-ever goal in the competition. He was also named the African Footballer of the Year in 1993. He is the third all time highest goalscorer in Africa Cup of Nations history with 13 goals.

== Club career ==
Yekini was born in Kaduna, of Yoruba origin. After starting his professional career in the Nigerian league, he moved to Ivory Coast to play for Africa Sports, and from there he went to Portugal and Vitória de Setúbal where he experienced his most memorable years, eventually becoming the Primeira Liga's top scorer in the 1993–94 season after scoring 21 goals; the previous campaign he had netted a career-best 34 in 32 games to help the Sadinos gain promotion from the second division, and those performances earned him the title of African Footballer of the Year once, the first ever for the nation.

In the summer of 1994, Yekini signed for Greek club Olympiacos, but did not get along with teammates and left soon after. His career never really got back on track, not even upon a return to Setúbal which happened after another unassuming spell, in La Liga with Sporting de Gijón; he successively played with FC Zürich, CA Bizertin and Al Shabab, before rejoining Africa Sports. In 2003, aged 39, he returned to the Nigerian championship with Julius Berger.

In April 2005, 41-year-old Yekini made a short comeback, moving alongside former national teammate Mobi Oparaku to Gateway United.

== International career ==
Scoring 37 goals for Nigeria in 62 appearances, Yekini is the national record goalscorer. He was part of the team that participated in the 1994 and 1998 FIFA World Cups. In the 1994 tournament, he scored Nigeria's first-ever World Cup goal in a 3–0 win against Bulgaria; his celebration, crying while holding the net, became one of the iconic images of the competition.

Additionally, Yekini helped the Super Eagles win the 1994 Africa Cup of Nations in Tunisia, where he topped the goal charts and was named player of the tournament. He also represented Nigeria at the 1988 Summer Olympics in Seoul.

=== International goals ===
Scores and results list Nigeria's goal tally first, score column indicates score after each Yekini goal.

List of international goals scored by Rashidi Yekini
No.	Date	Venue	Opponent	Score	Result	Competition
1	6 April 1985	Nairobi, Kenya	Kenya	3–0	3–0	1986 FIFA World Cup qualification
2	20 April 1985	Lagos, Nigeria	Kenya	2–0	3–1	1986 FIFA World Cup qualification
3	23 June 1985	Abidjan, Ivory Coast	Ivory Coast		1–1	Friendly
4	26 June 1985	Bouaké, Ivory Coast	Ivory Coast		1–1	Friendly
5	14 March 1988	Rabat, Morocco	Kenya	1–0	3–0	1988 African Cup of Nations
6	5 March 1990	Algiers, Algeria	Egypt	1–0	1–0	1990 African Cup of Nations
7	8 March 1990	Algiers, Algeria	Ivory Coast	1–0	1–0	1990 African Cup of Nations
8	12 March 1990	Algiers, Algeria	Zambia	2–0	2–0	1990 African Cup of Nations
9	27 July 1991	Lagos, Nigeria	Burkina Faso	1–0	7–1	1992 African Cup of Nations qualification
10	27 July 1991	Lagos, Nigeria	Burkina Faso	3–1	7–1	1992 African Cup of Nations qualification
11	27 July 1991	Lagos, Nigeria	Burkina Faso	4–1	7–1	1992 African Cup of Nations qualification
12	27 July 1991	Lagos, Nigeria	Burkina Faso	6–1	7–1	1992 African Cup of Nations qualification
13	14 January 1992	Dakar, Senegal	Kenya	1–0	2–1	1992 African Cup of Nations
14	14 January 1992	Dakar, Senegal	Kenya	2–0	2–1	1992 African Cup of Nations
15	19 January 1992	Dakar, Senegal	Zaire	1–0	1–0	1992 African Cup of Nations
16	25 January 1992	Dakar, Senegal	Cameroon	2–1	2–1	1992 African Cup of Nations
17	10 October 1992	Lagos, Nigeria	South Africa	3–0	4–0	1994 FIFA World Cup qualification
18	10 October 1992	Lagos, Nigeria	South Africa	4–0	4–0	1994 FIFA World Cup qualification
19	20 December 1992	Pointe-Noire, Congo	Congo	1–0	1–0	1994 FIFA World Cup qualification
20	25 April 1993	Lagos, Nigeria	Sudan	1–0	4–0	1994 African Cup of Nations qualification
21	2 May 1993	Abidjan, Ivory Coast	Ivory Coast	1–0	1–2	1994 FIFA World Cup qualification
22	3 July 1993	Lagos, Nigeria	Algeria	2–1	4–1	1994 FIFA World Cup qualification
23	3 July 1993	Lagos, Nigeria	Algeria	3–1	4–1	1994 FIFA World Cup qualification
24	24 July 1993	Lagos, Nigeria	Ethiopia	2–0	6–0	1994 African Cup of Nations qualification
25	24 July 1993	Lagos, Nigeria	Ethiopia	3–0	6–0	1994 African Cup of Nations qualification
26	24 July 1993	Lagos, Nigeria	Ethiopia	5–0	6–0	1994 African Cup of Nations qualification
27	25 September 1993	Lagos, Nigeria	Ivory Coast	3–1	4–1	1994 FIFA World Cup qualification
28	25 September 1993	Lagos, Nigeria	Ivory Coast	4–1	4–1	1994 FIFA World Cup qualification
29	26 March 1994	Tunis, Tunisia	Gabon	1–0	3–0	1994 African Cup of Nations
30	26 March 1994	Tunis, Tunisia	Gabon	3–0	3–0	1994 African Cup of Nations
31	2 April 1994	Tunis, Tunisia	Zaire	1–0	2–0	1994 African Cup of Nations
32	2 April 1994	Tunis, Tunisia	Zaire	2–0	2–0	1994 African Cup of Nations
33	6 April 1994	Tunis, Tunisia	Ivory Coast	2–2	2–2	1994 African Cup of Nations
34	11 June 1994	Ibadan, Nigeria	Georgia	2–1	5–1	Friendly
35	11 June 1994	Ibadan, Nigeria	Georgia	3–1	5–1	Friendly
36	21 June 1994	Dallas, United States	Bulgaria	1–0	3–0	1994 FIFA World Cup
37	22 February 1998	Kingston, Jamaica	Jamaica	1–0	2–2	Friendly

== Honors ==
Shooting Stars

- CAF Champions League runner-up: 1984
- Nigerian Premier League: 1983

Abiola Babes

- Nigerian FA Cup: 1985, 1987

Africa Sports

- Côte d'Ivoire Premier Division: 1987, 1988, 1989, 1999
- Côte d'Ivoire Cup: 1989, 2002
- Coupe Houphouët-Boigny: 1987, 1988, 1989

Al Shabab

- Crown Prince Cup: 1999

Nigeria

- African Cup of Nations: 1994; runner-up: 1984, 1988, 1990; third place: 1992
- CSSA Nations Cup third place: 1987
- CEDEAO Cup: 1990
- World Team of the Year: 1996
- African National Team of the Year: 1993, 1994

Individual

- African Cup of Nations best player: 1994
- African Cup of Nations top goalscorer: 1992, 1994
- African Cup of Nations Team of the Tournament: 1992, 1994
- CAF Golden Jubilee Best Players poll

== Personal life ==
Yekini married three wives. He had three daughters, named Yemisi, Omoyemi and Damilola.

== Death ==
Yekini was reported to be ill for an extended period of time. In 2011, news media in Nigeria began issuing reports of his failing health, and he was said to suffer from bipolar disorder and some other undisclosed psychiatric condition. He died in Ibadan on 4 May 2012, aged 48. His death was confirmed by former national teammates Mutiu Adepoju and Ike Shorunmu, and he was buried at his residence in Ira, Kwara State, in the presence of family members.
