= Chanda Mwaba =

Zambian footballer (born 1988)

Personal information
- Date of birth: 2 October 1988 (age 38)
- Place of birth: Zambia
- Height: 1.72 m (5 ft 7 1/2 in)
- Position: Midfielder

Senior career*
Years	Team	Apps	(Gls)
–2007	Power Dynamos		
2007–2010	RoPS	93	(11)
2008	→ Power Dynamos (loan)	?	(1)

International career
2009	Zambia	1	(0)
- * Club domestic league appearances and goals as of 28 September 2010

Chanda Mwaba (born 2 October 1988) is a Zambian former football midfielder.

== Career ==
Mwaba was one of the Zambians who came to RoPS in 2007 aged just 18, joining RoPS with Nchimunya Mweetwa, Stephen Kunda, Chileshe Chibwe and Zeddy Saileti's younger brother Derik Saileti for a trial. The quintet of Mweetwa, Kunda, Chibwe and Mwaba were awarded professional contracts with RoPS, with Mwaba signing a 4-year deal (until 2010), but extended it for a further 2 years in 2007. At the end of the season RoPS won promotion to Veikkausliiga (Finnish Premier Division), and Mwaba was called by Kari Virtanen the most promising 18-year-old in Finland he has seen. Mwaba also received praise from Jyrki Heliskoski the former HJK and former Finnish National team coach.

On 15 November 2008 RoPS revealed that Mwaba had been loaned to his former club Power Dynamos F.C. where he would play alongside Stephen Kunda on a guest player status. During the loan spell, Mwaba scored Power Dynamos' first goal against Roan United, in a game that eventually ended 2-2.

On 12 July 2009, during a game against FF Jaro, Jakobstad, Mwaba provided four assists for RoPS, with his side coming out 5-3 victors. Mwaba also provided a pass which lead to a penalty being awarded to his team, but it was later missed by Mika-Matti Maisonvaara.

On 6 August 2009, Mwaba received his first call up to the Zambia's national football team by Hervé Renard. He impressed Renard, who was before watching the game against FC Lahti. Zambia faced Ghana in London on 12 August, but Mwaba and seven other Zambian players did not get their visas in time due to a heavy workload in the embassy.

Mwaba and eight other RoPS players got sacked in the spring of 2011 due to a match fixing scandal. Mwaba also received a 20-month prison sentence for bribery.
