= Evans Sakala =

Zambian footballer (born 1970)

Personal information
- Date of birth: 10 October 1970 (age 56)

International career
Years	Team	Apps	(Gls)
1993–1994	Zambia	15	(1)

Evans Sakala (born 10 October 1970) is a Zambian footballer. He played in 15 matches for the Zambia national football team in 1993 and 1994. He was also named in Zambia's squad for the 1994 African Cup of Nations tournament.
