= Christopher Musonda =

Zambian footballer (born 1986)

Personal information
- Date of birth: January 24, 1986 (age 40)
- Height: 1.82 m (5 ft 11 1/2 in)
- Positions: Forward; winger

Senior career*
Years	Team	Apps	(Gls)
2007–2008	Forest Rangers		
2008	→ Power Dynamos (loan)		
2009–2010	RoPS	49	(12)
2012–2013	NAPSA Stars		
2014–2017	Nico United		

International career
2008	Zambia	1	(0)
- * Club domestic league appearances and goals as of 13 June 2021

Christopher Musonda (born January 24, 1986) is a retired Zambian football player. Characterized as a pacy forward, Musonda could also play as a winger.

He was capped for Zambia and played abroad in Finland and Botswana. Musonda and eight other RoPS players got sacked in the spring of 2011 due to match fixing scandal.
