= Amadou Pathé Diallo =

Malian footballer and manager

Amadou Diallo
Personal information
- Full name: Amadou Pathé Diallo
- Date of birth: 11 October 1964 (age 62)
- Place of birth: Bamako, Mali
- Position: Midfielder

Senior career*
Years	Team	Apps	(Gls)
1987–1988	Sporting CP	58	(4)
1988–1989	Académico Viseu		
1989–1990	F.C. Penafiel		
1990–1996	CDR Quarteirense		
1996–2000	Portimonense S.C.		

International career
1993–1994	Mali		

Managerial career
- 2006: Mali (caretaker)
- 2012: Mali (caretaker)
- 2013: Mali (caretaker)
- * Club domestic league appearances and goals

Amadou Pathé Diallo (born 11 October 1964) is a Malian professional football player and manager.

== Career ==
Amadou Diallo played for the Portuguese clubs Sporting CP, Académico Viseu, F.C. Penafiel, CDR Quarteirense and Portimonense S.C. He was a player of the Mali national football team.

In 2006, 2012 and 2013 he was an interim coach of the Mali national football team.
