= Michel Bassolé =

Ivorian footballer (born 1972)

Personal information
- Date of birth: 18 July 1972 (age 54)
- Place of birth: Abidjan, Ivory Coast
- Height: 1.74 m (5 ft 9 in)
- Position: Midfielder

Senior career*
Years	Team	Apps	(Gls)
1990–1994	ASEC Mimosas		
1994–1995	Muscat Club		
1995–1996	Ettifaq FC		
2001–2002	Ajaccio		
2002–2004	Porto Vecchio		

International career
1990–1997	Ivory Coast	25	(4)
- * Club domestic league appearances and goals

Michel Bassolé (born 18 July 1972) is an Ivorian former professional footballer who played as a midfielder. He played in 25 matches for the Ivory Coast national team from 1990 to 1997. He was also named in Ivory Coast's squad for the 1994 African Cup of Nations tournament.

He acquired French nationality.

== Career statistics ==
=== International ===
Appearances and goals by national team and year
National team	Year	Apps	Goals
Ivory Coast	1990	2	0
Ivory Coast	1991	1	0
Ivory Coast	1994	12	3
Ivory Coast	1996	4	0
Ivory Coast	1997	6	1
Total		25	4

Scores and results list Ivory Coast's goal tally first, score column indicates score after each Bassolé goal.

List of international goals scored by Michel Bassolé
No.	Date	Venue	Opponent	Score	Result	Competition	Ref.
1	6 April 1994	El Menzah Stadium, Tunis, Tunisia	Nigeria	1–0	2–2	1994 Africa Cup of Nations	
2	6 April 1994	El Menzah Stadium, Tunis, Tunisia	Nigeria	2–1	2–2	1994 Africa Cup of Nations	
3	10 December 1994	Independence Stadium, Windhoek, Namibia	Namibia	1–2	1–2	Friendly	
4	22 June 1997	Stade de la Paix, Bouaké, Ivory Coast	Algeria	2–1	2–1	1998 Africa Cup of Nations qualification	
