= Zeddy Saileti =

Zambian footballer (born 1969)

Personal information
- Date of birth: 16 January 1969 (age 57)
- Place of birth: Luanshya, Zambia
- Height: 1.82 m (6 ft 0 in)
- Position: Striker

Senior career*
| Years | Team | Apps | (Gls) |
| 1986–1987 | FC Roan United | ? | (?) |
| 1987-1994 | Nkana F.C. | ? | (?) |
| 1994–2009 | RoPS | 381 | (92) |

International career
| 1994–1999 | Zambia | 23 | (3) |

Managerial career
- 2009–2011: RoPS
- 2017–: Nkana FC
- * Club domestic league appearances and goals as of 19:16 4 July 2009(UTC)

Zeddy Saileti (born 1969) is a former Zambian football striker and football coach, currently the manager of Nkana Football Club in Kitwe. As a good goalscorer, he formed part of the Zambia squad that reached the final of the 1994 African Nations Cup, eventually losing 2–1 to Nigeria. Saileti was born and raised in a family of eleven children. His father was a mine worker and his mother a home school teacher. His little brother Derek Saileti is also a football player. Saileti used to play several sports when he was young – mostly football and tennis. The Luanshya mining company paid for the gear. Saileti has four daughters, two of which live in Zambia.

== Background ==
Saileti thanks Roger Milla for getting noticed by RoPS chairman Jouko Kiistala in the beginning of the 1990s. Kiistala had admired Milla's talent and decided to scout African players for his club with the help of his brother and his brothers Zambian friend who were studying in London at the time. The Zambian friend was sent to scout good Zambian based players for RoPS, resulting in the discovery of Saileti. Despite other offers being on the table, Saileti opted for exotic Finland.

== Saileti in Lapland ==
He had played since 1994, for RoPS, a Finnish club based in Rovaniemi, currently in the Ykkönen, the second highest level in Finnish football. Saileti was a vital part of the team at which he spent 16 seasons. He was the team's top goalscorer in 1995, 1996, 2000, 2001, 2004, 2005, 2006 and 2008. Saileti has the most appearances in the Veikkausliiga with RoPS, and is the second highest all-time scorer with 65 league goals across 294 games. While in the Ykkönen, the Finnish second highest tier, with RoPS, he scored 27 goals in 86 games.

At the end of 2007, Saileti signed a new contract with RoPS, making him a player-coach for the team.

Later, he was named RoPS co-head coach together with Jorma Turpeenniemi. Saileti decided to retire at the end of the 2009 season. On 17 October 2009, he played his last game for RoPS, against Kuopion Palloseura at the age of 40.

Saileti has been connected with match-fixing that happened in the main Finnish football league Veikkausliiga in 2008–2011. According to the Finnish Long Play, Saileti was the main contact between the convicted Wilson Raj Perumal and the players who participated in match-fixing. Saileti was never made to appear in a court hearing, nor was he convicted of the allegations.
