= Mali national football team =

Men's national association football team representing Mali

Mali
- Nickname: Les Aigles (The Eagles)
- Association: Fédération Malienne de Football (FMF)
- Confederation: CAF (Africa)
- Sub-confederation: WAFU (West Africa)
- Head coach: Anthony da Silva
- Captain: Yves Bissouma
- Most caps: Seydou Keita (102)
- Top scorer: Seydou Keita (25)
- Home stadium: Stade du 26 Mars
- FIFA code: MLI
First colours	Second colours	Third colours

FIFA ranking
- Current: 43 ▲4 (18 November 2026)
- Highest: 23 (June 2013)
- Lowest: 117 (October 2001)

First international
- Mali 4–3 Central African Republic (Madagascar; 13 April 1960)

Biggest win
- Mali 11–0 Mauritania (Senegal; 1 October 1972)

Biggest defeat
- Algeria 7–0 Mali (Algeria; 13 November 1988); Kuwait 8–1 Mali (Kuwait City, Kuwait; 5 September 1997)

Africa Cup of Nations
- Appearances: 14 (first in 1972)
- Best result: Runners-up (1972)

African Nations Championship
- Appearances: 3 (first in 2011)
- Best result: Runners-up (2016, 2020)

The Mali national football team (Bambara: Mali jamana ntolatantɔn, French: Équipe du Mali de football) represents Mali in men's international football and is governed by the Malian Football Federation. The team's nickname is Les Aigles. They represent the country at tournaments organized by both FIFA and the Confederation of African Football (CAF).

While Mali is a major youth football power in both Africa and the world, they have never qualified for any senior FIFA World Cup finals in history. They have qualified for the Africa Cup of Nations on 14 occasions.

Mali were suspended by FIFA on 17 March 2017 due to 'government interference' with the national football association, namely dissolving its executive committee. However, the side was re-instated by FIFA on 29 April after the executive committee was re-introduced by the Malian government.

== History ==
Mali reached the 1972 African Nations Cup final, but lost 3–2 to Congo. They failed to qualify for the finals again until 1994 when they reached the semi-finals, an achievement repeated in 2002, 2004, 2012 and 2013.

They played their first World Cup qualifier in the year 2000. As part of the CAF's qualifiers for the 2002 World Cup, Mali lost in the preliminary round to Libya. Two years later, the country hosted the 2002 African Cup of Nations.

Mali's under-23's team managed to qualify for the 2004 Summer Olympics in Greece. The team coached by Cheick Kone managed to reach the quarter-finals of the Olympic tournament before losing to Italy.

In the 2006 World Cup qualifiers, Mali beat Guinea-Bissau in the preliminaries. In the resulting second round, Mali finished fifth in its group. On 27 March 2005, riots broke out in Bamako after Mali lost a World Cup qualifier to Togo, 2–1 on a last minute goal.

In the 2010 African Nations Cup, Mali made football headlines for coming back from losing 4–0 with eleven minutes left to level 4–4 with Angola.

In the AFCON of 2025 Mali defeated Tunisia on penalties, reaching the quarter finals against Senegal, without losing a single match in the whole tournament.

== Team image ==
=== Team kit ===
Manufacturer	Period
(Italy) Kappa	1998–2003
(France) Baliston	2003–2007
(France) Airness	2007–2026
(France) WA	2026-2030

== Rivalries ==
=== Tunisia ===
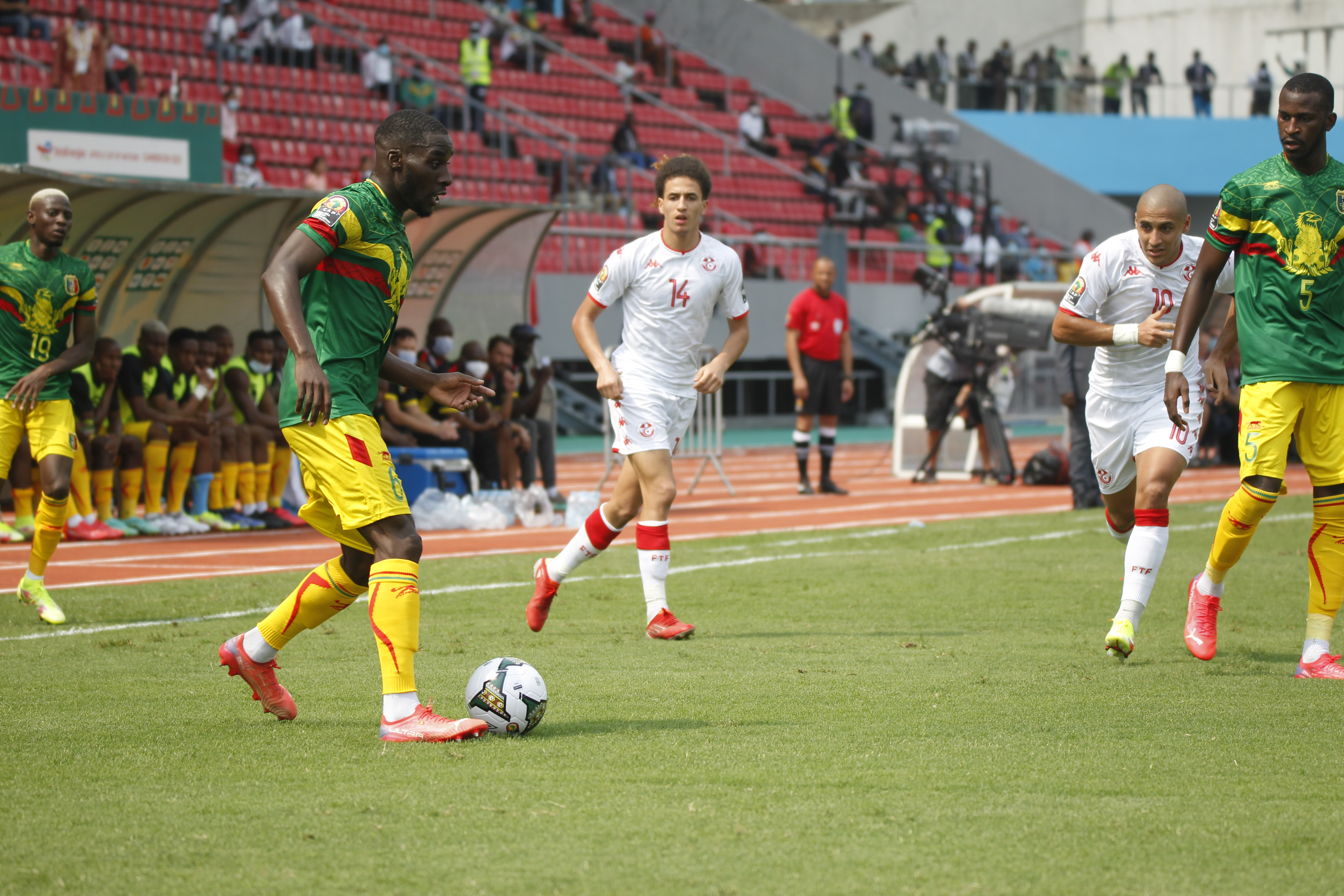
Mali v Tunisia at the 2021 Africa Cup of Nations.

The rivalry between Mali and Tunisia has been evident in recent years in terms of the number of frequent matches, especially in the Africa Cup of Nations. The two teams met for the first time on 6 January 1974, during a friendly match in Bamako, which ended with a 1–0 victory for Mali. The match between the two teams in the 1994 African Cup of Nations, which was held in Tunisia, remains one of the biggest setbacks witnessed by the Tunisian national team, as Mali won the match 2–0, which led to Tunisia's early exclusion from the tournament that was held on its soil. In recent years, the team's matches have continued, as they met in the last three consecutive editions of the African Cup of Nations 2019, 2021 and 2023, all of which were in the group stage, where Mali won two matches and one ended in a draw. The two teams met in the third and final round of the 2022 World Cup qualification. Two round-robin matches were played. However, Tunisia qualified for the World Cup after winning the first leg in Bamako 1–0 with an own goal from defender Moussa Sissako, and a goalless draw prevailed in the return match in Radès. This was Mali's closest chance of qualifying for the World Cup. The competition record remains with Tunisia with a slight advantage. Tunisia won 6 matches, 3 of which ended in draws, and Mali won 5 matches.

== Results and fixtures ==
The following is a list of match results in the last 12 months, as well as any future matches that have been scheduled.

Win Draw Loss Fixture

=== 2025 ===
18 November Friendly	Jordan	0–0	Mali	Tunis, Tunisia
20:30 UTC+1		Report		Stadium: Hammadi Agrebi Stadium; Referee: Nidhal Ben Ltaief (Tunisia)

22 December 2025 AFCON Group A	Mali	1–1	Zambia	Casablanca, Morocco
15:00 UTC+1	Sinayoko 61'	Report	Daka 90+2'	Stadium: Mohammed V Stadium; Attendance: 10,124; Referee: Omar Artan (Somalia)

26 December 2025 AFCON Group A	Morocco	1–1	Mali	Rabat, Morocco
21:00 UTC+1	Brahim 45+5' (pen.)	Report	Sinayoko 64' (pen.)	Stadium: Prince Moulay Abdellah Stadium; Attendance: 63,844; Referee: Abdou Mefire (Cameroon)

29 December 2025 AFCON Group A	Comoros	0–0	Mali	Casablanca, Morocco
20:00 UTC+1		Report	Haidara (red card) 88'	Stadium: Mohammed V Stadium; Attendance: 8,842; Referee: Alhadji Allaou Mahamat (Chad)

=== 2026 ===
3 January 2025 AFCON R16	Mali	1–1 (a.e.t.) (3–2 p)	Tunisia	Casablanca, Morocco
20:00 UTC+1	W. Coulibaly (red card) 26'; Sinayoko 90+6' (pen.)	Report	Chaouat 88'	Stadium: Mohammed V Stadium; Attendance: 41,982; Referee: Abongile Tom (South Africa)
	Penalties
	Bissouma (penalty missed); Sinayoko (penalty scored); Dorgeles (penalty missed); Diakité (penalty scored); Touré (penalty scored)		(penalty scored) Meriah; (penalty missed) Abdi; (penalty scored) Saad; (penalty missed) Achouri; (penalty missed) Ben Romdhane

9 January 2025 AFCON QF	Mali	0–1	Senegal	Tangier, Morocco
17:00 UTC+1	Bissouma (yellow card) 23' (yellow-red card) 45+3'	Report	I. Ndiaye 27'	Stadium: Tangier Grand Stadium; Attendance: 32,385; Referee: Abongile Tom (South Africa)

31 March Friendly	Russia	0–0	Mali	Saint Petersburg, Russia
20:00 UTC+3		Report		Stadium: Krestovsky Stadium; Attendance: 34,837; Referee: Rustam Lutfullin (Uzbekistan)

4 June Friendly	Iran	2–0	Mali	Antalya, Turkey
17:30 UTC+3	Ezatolahi 12'; Rezaeian 55'			Stadium: Mardan Sports Complex

23 September 2027 AFCON qualification	Mali	3–1	Cape Verde	Bamako, Mali
19:00 UTC+0	Tia 5'; Nene 39', 51'	Report	Lopes Cabral 10'	Stadium: Stade du 26 Mars; Referee: Jean-Jacques Ndala (DR Congo)

27 September 2027 AFCON qualification	Liberia	0–1	Mali	Monrovia, Liberia
19:00 UTC+0		Report	Tia 79'	Stadium: Antoinette Tubman Stadium; Referee: Mohamed Guedi (Djibouti)

3 October Friendly	Morocco	1–1	Mali	Tangier, Tunisia
18:00 UTC+0	Ezzalzouli 35' (pen.)	Report	G. Diarra 77'	Stadium: Tangier Grand Stadium; Attendance: 65,079; Referee: Abdel Aziz Bouh (Mauritania)

11 November 2027 AFCON qualification	Mali	3–2	Rwanda	Bamako, Mali
20:00 UTC+0	K. Doumbia 43'; Yeo 63'; M. Camara 84'	Report	Kwizera 29'; Kavita 54'	Stadium: 26 March Stadium; Referee: Messie Nkounkou (Congo)

15 November 2027 AFCON qualification	Rwanda	0–2	Mali	Kigali, Rwanda
20:00 UTC+2		Report	Sagnan 27'; G. Diarra 88'	Stadium: Amahoro Stadium; Referee: Lahlou Benbraham (Algeria)

=== 2027 ===
24 March 2027 AFCON qualification	Cape Verde	v	Mali	TBD, Cape Verde
TBD				Stadium: TBD

28 March 2027 AFCON qualification	Mali	v	Liberia	TBD, Mali
TBD				Stadium: TBD

== Coaching staff ==
Position	Name
Head coach	(Portugal) Anthony da Silva
Assistant coach	(Mali) Alou Badra Diallo
Goalkeeper coach	(Mali) Bounafou Doumbia
Fitness coaches	(South Africa) Riedoh Berdien (France) Alexandre Coppolani (Mali) Bougadary Sangare
Team doctor	(Mali) Dr. Halidou Maiga
Video analyst	(Belgium) Gregory Verheyden (Republic of Ireland) Stephen Oonan
International Scouts	(Italy) Alessandro Soli (Germany) Robby Echelmeyer

=== Coaching history ===
Caretaker managers are listed in italics.

- (Mali) Ben Oumar Sy (1960–66)
- (Hungary) György Tóth (1966–70)
- (West Germany) Karl-Heinz Weigang (1970–73)
- (Soviet Union) Mykola Holovko (1979–82)
- (Mali) Kidian Diallo (1982–89)
- (Mali) Molobaly Sissoko (1989–93)
- (Mali) Mamadou Keïta (1993–97)
- (France) Christian Sarramagna (1998–2000)
- (Italy) Romano Mattè (2000–01)
- (Poland) Henryk Kasperczak (2001–02)
- (France) Christian Dalger (2002–03)
- (France) Henri Stambouli (2003–04)
- (France) Alain Moizan (2004)
- (Mali) Mamadou Keïta (2004–05)
- (France) Pierre Lechantre (2005–06)
- (Mali) Amadou Pathé Diallo (2006)
- (France) Jean-François Jodar (2006–08)
- (Nigeria) Stephen Keshi (2008–10)
- (France) Alain Giresse (2010–12)
- (Mali) Amadou Pathé Diallo (2012)
- (France) Patrice Carteron (2012–13)
- (Mali) Amadou Pathé Diallo (2013)
- (Poland) Henryk Kasperczak (2013–15)
- (France) Alain Giresse (2015–17)
- (Mali) Mohamed Magassouba (2017–2022)
- (Mali) Éric Chelle (2022–2024)
- (Belgium) Tom Saintfiet (2024–2026)
- (Portugal) Anthony da Silva (2026–)

== Players ==
=== Current squad ===
The following players were called up for the friendly matches against Rwanda on 13 and 17 November 2026.
Caps and goals correct as of 13 November 2026, after the match against Rwanda.

No.	Pos.	Player	Date of birth (age)	Caps	Goals	Club
	GK	Djigui Diarra	27 February 1995 (age 31)	68	0	(Tanzania Football Federation) Young Africans
	GK	Mamadou Samassa	16 February 1990 (age 36)	20	0	(French Football Federation) Laval
	GK	Emile Doucouré	28 September 2007 (age 19)	1	0	(Royal Belgian Football Association) Genk
	DF	Hamari Traoré	27 January 1992 (age 34)	62	3	(French Football Federation) Paris
	DF	Amadou Dante	7 October 2000 (age 26)	20	0	(Football Association of the Czech Republic) Zbrojovka Brno
	DF	Ousmane Camara	6 March 2003 (age 23)	12	0	(French Football Federation) Angers
	DF	Fodé Doucouré	3 February 2001 (age 25)	10	0	(French Football Federation) Nantes
	DF	Nathan Gassama	5 January 2001 (age 25)	10	0	(Russian Football Union) Baltika Kaliningrad
	DF	Daouda Guindo	14 October 2002 (age 24)	8	0	(French Football Federation) Reims
	DF	Modibo Sagnan	14 April 1999 (age 27)	6	1	(Turkish Football Federation) Çaykur Rizespor
	DF	Cheick Keita	2 April 2003 (age 23)	3	0	(Royal Belgian Football Association) Charleroi
	MF	Amadou Haidara	31 January 1998 (age 28)	53	2	(French Football Federation) Lens
	MF	Aliou Dieng	15 October 1997 (age 29)	51	2	(Royal Spanish Football Federation) Valencia
	MF	Kamory Doumbia	18 February 2003 (age 23)	34	15	(French Football Federation) Brest
	MF	Mamadou Sangaré	26 June 2002 (age 24)	20	0	(The Football Association) Brentford
	MF	Gaoussou Diakité	26 September 2005 (age 21)	6	0	(Austrian Football Association) Red Bull Salzburg
	MF	Ousmane Diakité	25 July 2000 (age 26)	3	0	(The Football Association) West Bromwich Albion
	MF	Mohamadou Kanté	20 September 2005 (age 21)	1	0	(The Football Association) West Ham United
	FW	Dorgeles Nene	23 December 2002 (age 23)	36	11	(Turkish Football Federation) Fenerbahçe
	FW	Lassine Sinayoko	8 December 1999 (age 26)	33	10	(French Football Federation) Paris
	FW	Gaoussou Diarra	21 November 2002 (age 23)	14	2	(Royal Dutch Football Association) Feyenoord
	FW	Mamadou Doumbia	18 February 2006 (age 20)	8	1	(The Football Association) Watford
	FW	Mamadou Camara	7 February 2001 (age 25)	5	1	(French Football Federation) Montpellier
	FW	Moussa Yeo	1 June 2004 (age 22)	1	1	(Football Association of Wales) Swansea City

=== Recent call-ups ===
The following players have also been called up for Mali in the last twelve months.

Pos.	Player	Date of birth (age)	Caps	Goals	Club	Latest call-up
GK	N'Golo Traoré	31 December 1999 (age 26)	0	0	(Mali) Stade Malien	v. Morocco, 4 October 2026
GK	Ismael Diawara	11 November 1994 (age 32)	10	0	(Sweden) Sirius	v. Russia, 31 March 2026
DF	Adama Camara	18 October 1996 (age 30)	2	0	(France) Paris	v. Morocco, 4 October 2026
DF	Woyo Coulibaly	26 May 1999 (age 27)	5	0	(England) Leicester City	v. Iran, 4 June 2026
DF	Kalidou Sidibé	28 January 1999 (age 27)	1	0	(Russia) Akhmat Grozny	v. Iran, 4 June 2026
DF	Mamadou Fofana	21 January 1998 (age 28)	50	1	(United States) New England Revolution	v. Russia, 31 March 2026
DF	Abdoulaye Diaby	4 July 2000 (age 26)	14	0	(Switzerland) Grasshopper	v. Russia, 31 March 2026
DF	Ibrahima Cissé	15 February 2001 (age 25)	3	0	Unattached	v. Russia, 31 March 2026
DF	Cheick Oumar Konaté	2 April 2004 (age 22)	3	0	(Belgium) Beveren	v. Russia, 31 March 2026
DF	Alpha Sissoko	7 March 1997 (age 29)	0	0	(France) Montpellier	v. Russia, 31 March 2026
DF	Sikou Niakaté	10 July 1999 (age 27)	14	1	(Portugal) Braga	2025 Africa Cup of Nations
MF	Lassana Coulibaly	10 April 1996 (age 30)	59	1	(Italy) Lecce	v. Morocco, 4 October 2026
MF	Issa Djiguiba	4 January 2004 (age 22)	0	0	(Rwanda) Rayon Sports	v. Morocco, 4 October 2026
MF	Mohamed Camara	6 January 2000 (age 26)	35	3	(Qatar) Al-Sadd	v. Iran, 4 June 2026
MF	Soumaïla Diabaté	22 November 1997 (age 28)	1	0	(Austria) Red Bull Salzburg	v. Iran, 4 June 2026
MF	Moussa Diakité	4 November 2003 (age 23)	1	0	(Turkey) Çaykur Rizespor	v. Iran, 4 June 2026
MF	Ibrahima Sissoko	27 October 1997 (age 29)	4	0	(France) Nantes	v. Russia, 31 March 2026
MF	Mamadou Maiga	10 February 1995 (age 31)	1	0	(Russia) Pari Nizhny Novgorod	v. Russia, 31 March 2026
MF	Yves Bissouma (captain)	30 August 1996 (age 30)	46	5	(Netherlands) Ajax	2025 Africa Cup of Nations
MF	Mahamadou Doumbia	15 May 2004 (age 22)	6	0	(Saudi Arabia) Al-Ittihad	2025 Africa Cup of Nations
MF	Brahima Diarra	5 July 2003 (age 23)	1	0	(United Arab Emirates) Al Wahda	v. Jordan, 18 November 2025
FW	Sékou Koïta	28 November 1999 (age 26)	37	4	(Turkey) Gençlerbirliği	v. Morocco, 4 October 2026
FW	El Bilal Touré	3 October 2001 (age 25)	30	9	(Italy) Parma	v. Morocco, 4 October 2026
FW	Moussa Sylla	25 November 1999 (age 26)	6	0	(Germany) Schalke 04	v. Morocco, 4 October 2026
FW	Ange Martial Tia	20 November 2006 (age 20)	3	2	(France) Reims	v. Morocco, 4 October 2026
FW	Alimami Gory	30 August 1996 (age 30)	0	0	(Saudi Arabia) Abha	v. Morocco, 4 October 2026
FW	Sékou Maïga		0	0	(Mali) Binga	v. Iran, 4 June 2026
FW	Mahamadou Sissoko	26 November 2004 (age 21)	0	0	(Mali) Djoliba	v. Iran, 4 June 2026
FW	Harouna Camara	18 February 2001 (age 25)	1	0	(Russia) Torpedo Moscow	v. Russia, 31 March 2026
FW	Wilson Samaké	30 March 2004 (age 22)	0	0	(Finland) VPS	v. Russia, 31 March 2026
^{DCL} Player refused to join the team after the call-up.^{INJ} Player withdrew from the squad due to an injury.^{PRE} Preliminary squad.^{RET} Player has retired from international football.^{SUS} Suspended from the national team.

== Records ==
As of 22 December 2025
Players in bold are still active with Mali.

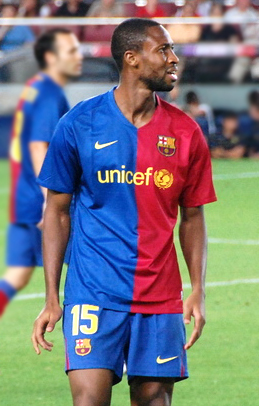
Seydou Keita is Mali's top goalscorer and their most capped player.

Most appearances
Rank	Player	Caps	Goals	Career
1	Seydou Keita	102	25	1998–2015
2	Mahamadou Sidibé	97	0	1996–2010
3	Bassala Touré	95	17	1992–2008
4	Adama Tamboura	89	0	2004–2015
5	Adama Coulibaly	85	1	1998–2014
6	Soumaila Coulibaly	83	14	1995–2009
7	**Djigui Diarra**	74	0	2015–present
8	Mahamadou Diarra	73	7	1998–2012
9	**Adama Traoré**	61	9	2013–present
10	**Hamari Traoré**	60	3	2015–present

Top goalscorers
Rank	Player	Goals	Caps	Ratio	Career
1	Seydou Keita	25	102	0.25	1998–2015
2	Frédéric Kanouté	23	39	0.77	2004–2010
3	Bassala Touré	17	95	0.18	1994–2008
4	**Kamory Doumbia**	15	29	0.52	2022–present
4	Cheick Diabaté	15	38	0.39	2005–2016
6	Yaya Dissa	14	42	0.33	1995–2001
6	Soumaila Coulibaly	14	83	0.17	1995–2009
8	**Ibrahima Koné**	13	22	0.59	2017–present
9	Modibo Maïga	12	58	0.21	2007–2016
10	Salif Keïta	11	26	0.42	1964–1972

== Competitive record ==
=== FIFA World Cup ===
FIFA World Cup record									Qualification record					
Year	Result	Position	Pld	W	D	L	GF	GA	Pld	W	D	L	GF	GA
1930 to 1962	Not a FIFA member								Not a FIFA member					
(England) 1966	Withdrew								Withdrew					
1970 to 1990	Did not enter								Did not enter					
(United States) 1994	Withdrew								Withdrew					
(France) 1998	Withdrew								Withdrew					
(South Korea) (Japan) 2002	Did not qualify								2	1	0	1	3	4
(Germany) 2006	Did not qualify								12	4	2	6	15	15
(South Africa) 2010	Did not qualify								12	6	3	3	21	15
(Brazil) 2014	Did not qualify								6	2	2	2	7	7
(Russia) 2018	Did not qualify								8	1	4	3	4	11
(Qatar) 2022	Did not qualify								8	5	2	1	11	1
(Canada) (Mexico) (United States) 2026	Did not qualify								10	5	3	2	17	6
(Morocco) (Portugal) (Spain) 2030	To be determined								To be determined					
(Saudi Arabia) 2034	To be determined								To be determined					
Total		0/15	0	0	0	0	0	0	58	24	16	18	78	59

=== Africa Cup of Nations ===
Mali have never won the Africa Cup of Nations; their best result at the tournament was runners-up in 1972. Mali have qualified for the tournament fourteen times in total, finishing as runners-up once, third twice, and fourth three times. Prior to 2008, each time Mali qualified, they reached the knockout stage having only qualified four times before then.

Africa Cup of Nations record										Qualification record					
Year	Result	Position	Pld	W	D	L	GF	GA	Squad	Pld	W	D	L	GF	GA
(Sudan) 1957	Part of France									Part of France					
(United Arab Republic) 1959	Part of France									Part of France					
(Ethiopia) 1962	Did not enter									Did not enter					
(Ghana) 1963	Did not enter									Did not enter					
(Tunisia) 1965	Did not qualify									Did not qualify					
(Ethiopia) 1968	Did not qualify									Did not qualify					
(Sudan) 1970	Did not qualify									Did not qualify					
(Cameroon) 1972	Runners-up	2nd	5	1	3	1	11	11	Squad	4	3	1	0	7	2
(Egypt) 1974	Did not qualify									4	1	3	0	8	6
(Ethiopia) 1976	Did not qualify									2	1	0	1	5	3
(Ghana) 1978	Did not qualify									2	1	0	1	1	2
(Nigeria) 1980	Did not qualify									Did not enter					
(Libya) 1982	Did not qualify									4	2	0	2	7	7
(Ivory Coast) 1984	Did not qualify									4	2	0	2	5	6
(Egypt) 1986	Did not qualify									4	1	2	1	4	9
(Morocco) 1988	Did not qualify									Withdrew					
(Algeria) 1990	Did not qualify									6	2	3	1	8	7
(Senegal) 1992	Did not qualify									6	0	3	3	2	7
(Tunisia) 1994	Fourth place	4th	5	2	0	3	4	8	Squad	6	3	1	2	8	7
(South Africa) 1996	Did not qualify									10	5	1	4	15	10
(Burkina Faso) 1998	Did not qualify									6	3	0	3	9	9
(Ghana) (Nigeria) 2000	Did not qualify									8	3	4	1	8	3
(Mali) 2002	Fourth place	4th	6	2	2	2	5	5	Squad	Qualified as hosts					
(Tunisia) 2004	Fourth place	4th	6	3	1	2	10	10	Squad	6	4	1	1	9	2
(Egypt) 2006	Did not qualify									12	4	2	6	15	15
(Ghana) 2008	Group stage	10th	3	1	1	1	1	3	Squad	6	3	3	0	10	1
(Angola) 2010	Group stage	9th	3	1	1	1	7	6	Squad	12	6	3	3	21	15
(Gabon) (Equatorial Guinea) 2012	Third place	3rd	6	3	1	2	6	5	Squad	6	3	1	2	9	6
(South Africa) 2013	Third place	3rd	6	2	2	2	7	8	Squad	2	2	0	0	7	1
(Equatorial Guinea) 2015	Group stage	10th	3	0	3	0	3	3	Squad	6	3	0	3	8	6
(Gabon) 2017	Group stage	12th	3	0	2	1	1	2	Squad	6	5	1	0	13	3
(Egypt) 2019	Round of 16	11th	4	2	1	1	6	3	Squad	6	4	2	0	10	2
(Cameroon) 2021	Round of 16	11th	4	2	2	0	4	1	Squad	6	4	1	1	10	4
(Ivory Coast) 2023	Quarter-finals	7th	5	2	2	1	6	4	Squad	6	5	0	1	15	2
(Morocco) 2025	Quarter-finals	8th	5	0	4	1	3	4	Squad	6	4	2	0	10	1
(Kenya) (Tanzania) (Uganda) 2027	To be determined									To be determined					
2028	To be determined									To be determined					
Total	Runners-up	14/35	64	21	25	18	74	73	—	146	74	34	38	224	136

=== African Nations Championship ===
Mali has competed in five African Nations Championship tournaments, finishing as runners-up twice.

African Nations Championship record									Qualification record					
Year	Result	Position	Pld	W	D	L	GF	GA	Pld	W	D	L	GF	GA
(Ivory Coast) 2009	Did not qualify								2	0	2	0	0	0
(Sudan) 2011	Group stage	13th	3	0	1	2	1	3	2	1	1	0	3	1
(South Africa) 2014	Quarter-finals	8th	4	2	1	1	6	5	2	1	0	1	3	2
(Rwanda) 2016	Runners-up	2nd	6	3	2	1	6	6	4	2	2	0	7	4
(Morocco) 2018	Did not qualify								4	1	2	1	6	3
(Cameroon) 2020	Runners-up	2nd	6	2	3	1	3	3	4	3	1	0	9	0
(Algeria) 2022	Group stage	15th	2	0	1	1	3	4	2	2	0	0	4	1
Total	Runners-up	5/7	21	7	8	6	19	21	20	10	8	2	32	11

=== African Games ===
African Games record
Year	Result	Pld	W	D	L	GF	GA
(Republic of the Congo) 1965	Runners-up	5	3	1	1	10	5
(Nigeria) 1973	Did not qualify						
(Algeria) 1978	Group stage	3	0	2	1	3	5
(Kenya) 1987	Did not qualify						
1991–present	See Mali national under-23 football team						
Total	2/4	8	3	3	2	13	10

== Head-to-head record ==
As of 4 October 2026

Team	Confederation	P	W	D	L	GF	GA	GD
Algeria	CAF	24	10	2	12	22	36	–14
Angola	CAF	4	1	2	1	8	5	+3
Benin	CAF	16	8	7	1	27	16	+11
Botswana	CAF	7	6	0	1	19	5	+14
Burkina Faso	CAF	21	13	3	5	36	20	+16
Cameroon	CAF	6	0	2	4	3	8	–5
Cape Verde	CAF	8	4	2	2	13	5	+8
Central African Republic	CAF	1	0	1	0	0	0	0
Chad	CAF	2	2	0	0	4	2	+2
China	AFC	2	1	0	1	3	5	–2
Congo	CAF	10	5	2	3	14	9	+5
DR Congo	CAF	7	3	1	3	11	10	+1
Comoros	CAF	3	2	1	0	6	0	+6
Croatia	UEFA	1	0	0	1	1	2	–1
Egypt	CAF	10	4	2	4	8	8	0
Equatorial Guinea	CAF	3	3	0	0	5	0	+5
Eswatini	CAF	2	2	0	0	7	0	+7
Eritrea	CAF	2	2	0	0	3	0	+3
Ethiopia	CAF	2	1	0	1	4	3	+1
Gabon	CAF	12	2	5	5	10	16	–6
Gambia	CAF	18	7	5	6	22	16	+6
Ghana	CAF	19	3	6	10	15	31	–16
Guinea	CAF	39	10	17	12	43	43	0
Guinea-Bissau	CAF	14	10	3	1	27	9	+18
Iran	AFC	2	1	0	1	2	3	–1
Ivory Coast	CAF	26	2	8	16	17	47	–30
Japan	AFC	1	0	1	0	1	1	0
Jordan	AFC	1	0	1	0	0	0	0
Kenya	CAF	2	1	1	0	4	2	+2
North Korea	AFC	1	0	0	1	0	1	–1
South Korea	AFC	1	0	0	1	1	3	–2
Kuwait	AFC	3	0	0	3	4	10	–10
Liberia	CAF	11	6	3	2	20	11	+9
Libya	CAF	7	3	1	3	9	10	–1
Lithuania	UEFA	1	1	0	0	3	1	+2
Madagascar	CAF	3	2	1	0	6	1	+5
Malawi	CAF	5	3	1	1	8	5	+3
Mauritania	CAF	30	18	7	5	60	23	+37
Morocco	CAF	21	5	8	8	14	33	–19
Mozambique	CAF	5	3	1	1	6	4	+2
Namibia	CAF	4	2	1	1	5	3	+2
Niger	CAF	8	5	2	1	10	4	+6
Nigeria	CAF	10	2	3	5	7	12	–5
Oman	AFC	2	0	1	1	1	2	–1
Qatar	AFC	1	0	1	0	0	0	0
Russia	UEFA	1	0	1	0	0	0	0
Rwanda	CAF	3	1	1	1	3	2	+1
Saudi Arabia	AFC	2	1	0	1	4	6	–2
Senegal	CAF	33	8	12	13	33	42	–9
Seychelles	CAF	2	2	0	0	5	0	+5
Sierra Leone	CAF	13	4	7	2	17	9	+8
South Africa	CAF	6	2	2	2	7	7	0
South Sudan	CAF	2	2	0	0	5	0	+5
Sudan	CAF	4	2	1	1	7	4	+3
Togo	CAF	14	6	2	6	23	15	+8
Tunisia	CAF	9	4	1	4	9	9	0
Uganda	CAF	4	1	2	1	8	4	+4
United Arab Emirates	AFC	1	0	1	0	0	0	0
Zambia	CAF	6	0	3	3	4	9	–5
Zimbabwe	CAF	6	2	1	3	4	5	–1

== Honours ==
=== Continental ===
- Africa Cup of Nations
  - Runners-up (1): 1972
  - Third place (2): 2012, 2013
- African Nations Championship
  - Runners-up (2): 2016, 2020
- African Games^{1}
  - Silver medal (1): 1965

=== Regional ===
- Amilcar Cabral Cup
  - (gold) Champions (3): 1989, 1997, 2007
  - (silver) Runners-up (4): 1979, 1981, 1987, 1988
  - (bronze) Third place (5): 1982, 1983, 1984, 1985, 2001
- UEMOA Tournament
  - (silver) Runners-up (3): 2008, 2011, 2016

=== Summary ===
Competition	1st place, gold medalist(s)	2nd place, silver medalist(s)	3rd place, bronze medalist(s)	Total
CAF African Cup of Nations	0	1	2	3
CAF African Nations Championship	0	2	0	2
Total	0	3	2	5

Notes

1. Competition organized by ANOCA, officially not recognized by FIFA.
