= List of football clubs in Burkina Faso =

This is a list of football (soccer) clubs in Burkina Faso. For a complete list see Category:Football clubs in Burkina Faso

== A ==
- AS Maya
- ASEC Koudougou
- ASFA Yennenga (13 national championships)

== B ==
- ASF Bobo (3 national championships)
- Bobo Sport
- Bouloumpoukou FC

== C ==
- Commune FC

== E ==
- Étoile Filante de Ouagadougou (13 national championships)

== J ==
- Jeunesse Club de Bobo Dioulasso

== M ==
- Majestic FC

== R ==
- RC Bobo (4 national championships)
- Rail Club du Kadiogo (4 national championships)
- Rahimo FC (3 national championships)

== S ==
- Santos Ouagadougou FC
- Silures Bobo Dioulasso (7 national championships, defunct since 1982)
- AS Sonabel
- Sourou Sport de Tougan
- Sanor de Sapone FC

== U ==
- USCO Banfora
- US Ouagadougou
- Union Sportive des Forces Armées (7 national championships)
- US FRAN (3 national championships)
- US Yatenga
