= 2013–14 Burkinabé Premier League =

Burkinabé Premier League
- Season: 2013–14
- Champions: Étoile Filante
- Relegated: US Yatenga; USFRAN
- Matches: 240
- Top goalscorer: Banou Diawara; Kafoumba Touré (14 goals)

The 2013–14 Burkinabé Premier League is the 52nd edition of top flight football in Burkina Faso. A total of sixteen teams competed in the season beginning on 7 December 2013 and ending on 27 July 2014.

== Teams ==
- ASF Bobo Dioulasso
- ASFA
- Bobo Sport
- Comoé
- Étoile Filante
- Kadiogo
- KOZAF
- Koudougou
- Majestic
- RC Bobo Dioulasso
- Santos
- SONABEL
- USFA
- US FRAN
- Ouagadougou
- Yatenga

== League table ==
Pos	Team	Pld	W	D	L	GF	GA	GD	Pts	Qualification or relegation
1	Étoile Filante (C)	30	19	7	4	35	12	+23	64	Qualification to the 2015 CAF Champions League
2	USFA	30	18	7	5	47	20	+27	61	
3	Kadiogo	30	15	7	8	27	19	+8	52	
4	RC Bobo Dioulasso	30	14	8	8	33	23	+10	50	
5	ASF Bobo Dioulasso	30	12	11	7	30	23	+7	47	
6	SONABEL	30	12	9	9	26	22	+4	45	
7	Santos	30	12	9	9	29	27	+2	45	
8	Majestic	30	10	13	7	27	18	+9	43	
9	ASFA	30	9	11	10	30	30	0	38	
10	Ouagadougou	30	9	9	12	24	30	−6	36	
11	Bobo Sport	30	7	14	9	19	22	−3	35	
12	KOZAF	30	7	12	11	23	27	−4	33	
13	Comoé	30	6	13	11	23	33	−10	31	
14	Koudougou	30	6	12	12	16	26	−10	30	
15	Yatenga (R)	30	4	6	20	12	36	−24	18	Relegation to the Burkinabé Second Division
16	US FRAN (R)	30	3	6	21	10	43	−33	15	Relegation to the Burkinabé Second Division

Updated to match(es) played on 27 July 2014. Source: Soccerway
Rules for classification: 1) points; 2) goal difference; 3) number of goals scored.
(C) Champions; (R) Relegated
