= 2011–12 Burkinabé Premier League =

Burkinabé Premier League
- Season: 2011–12
- Champions: ASFA

The 2011–12 Burkinabé Premier League is the 50th edition of top flight football in Burkina Faso. A total of twenty teams competed in the season.

== Teams ==
Group A

- ASFA
- AS Kouritenga
- Canon du Sud
- Étoile Filante
- Kadiogo
- Sanmatenga FC
- Santos
- SONABEL
- USFA
- Ouagadougou

Group B

- ASEC Koudougou
- ASFB
- AS Maya
- Bobo Sport
- Bouloumpoukou FC
- Comoé
- RC Bobo Dioulasso
- US FRAN
- Yatenga
- Sourou Sport de Tougan

== First stage ==
=== Group A ===
Team	Pld	W	D	L	GF	GA	GD	Pts	Qualification or relegation
SONABEL	18	10	4	4	25	11	+14	34	Advances to the Super division
ASFA	18	9	6	3	28	9	+19	33	Advances to the Super division
USFA	18	9	5	4	22	10	+12	32	Advances to the Super division
Étoile Filante	18	8	6	4	22	8	+14	30	Advances to the Super division
Kadiogo	18	7	9	2	18	12	+6	30	
Ouagadougou	18	7	5	6	18	12	+6	26	
Santos	18	5	4	9	13	23	−10	19	
AS Kouritenga	18	4	6	8	13	28	−15	18	Relegated to the Deuxième Division
Canon du Sud	18	3	7	8	14	29	−15	16	Relegated to the Deuxième Division
Sanmatenga FC	18	0	4	14	6	37	−31	4	Relegated to the Deuxième Division

=== Group B ===
Team	Pld	W	D	L	GF	GA	GD	Pts	Qualification or relegation
RC Bobo Dioulasso	18	8	8	2	14	8	+6	32	Advances to the Super division
Bouloumpoukou FC	18	7	10	1	19	8	+11	31	Advances to the Super division
Bobo Sport	18	7	8	3	12	9	+3	29	Advances to the Super division
Yatenga	18	6	9	3	18	13	+5	27	Advances to the Super division
AS Maya	18	6	7	5	13	15	−2	25	
Comoé	18	5	7	6	17	18	−1	22	
ASFB	18	4	8	6	10	10	0	20	
ASEC Koudougou	18	4	7	7	14	14	0	19	Relegated to the Deuxième Division
US FRAN	18	4	3	11	7	19	−12	15	Relegated to the Deuxième Division
Sourou Sport de Tougan	18	3	5	10	10	20	−10	14	Relegated to the Deuxième Division

== Super division ==
=== Table ===
Team	Pld	W	D	L	GF	GA	GD	Pts
ASFA (C)	14	9	3	2	19	7	+12	30
SONABEL	14	8	5	1	16	3	+13	29
RC Bobo Dioulasso	14	8	3	3	13	6	+7	27
USFA	14	6	3	5	12	9	+3	21
Bouloumpoukou FC	14	2	8	4	5	9	−4	14
Étoile Filante	14	2	6	6	6	11	−5	12
Bobo Sport	14	2	5	7	14	21	−7	11
Yatenga	14	1	3	10	3	22	−19	6

(C) Champions
