= 2013 Burkinabé Premier League =

Burkinabé Premier League
- Season: 2013
- Champions: ASFA Yennenga
- Relegated: JCB, AS Maya

Burkinabé Premier League is the top division of the Burkinabé Football Federation. It was created in 1961. A total of 16 teams contested the league in 2013.

== Teams ==
- AS Maya (Relegated) (Bobo-Dioulasso)
- AS SONABEL (Ouagadougou)
- ASFA Yennenga (Ouagadougou)
- ASFB Bobo (Bobo-Dioulasso)
- Bobo Sport (Bobo-Dioulasso)
- Bouloumpoukou FC (Koudougou)
- Étoile Filante de Ouagadougou (Ouagadougou)
- Majestic (Pô)
- JCB (Relegated) (Bobo-Dioulasso)
- Rail Club du Kadiogo (Kadiogo)
- RC Bobo (Bobo-Dioulasso)
- Santos FC (Ouagadougou)
- US Comoé (Banfora)
- US Forces Armées (Ouagadougou)
- US Ouagadougou (Ouagadougou)
- US Yatenga (Ouahigouya)

== League table ==
Teams	Points
ASFA Yennenga	65
Santos FC	53
US Ouagadougou	49
RC Bobo	48
US Forces Armées	47
Rail Club du Kadiogo	45
Étoile Filante de Ouagadougou	43
AS SONABEL	40
US Comoé	39
Bobo Sport	38
US Yatenga	35
Majestic FC	31
ASFB Bobo	29
Bouloumpoukou FC	28
JCB	24
AS Maya	23
