= 2019–20 Burkinabé Premier League =

Burkinabé Premier League
- Season: 2019–20
- Champions: (None; cancelled midseason)
- Matches played: 24 (of 30 scheduled)
- Top goalscorer: (Burkina Faso) Alassane (9 goals)

The 2019–20 Burkinabé Premier League was the 58th edition of the Burkinabé Premier League, the top-tier football league in Burkina Faso, since its establishment in 1961. It began on 31 August 2018, but was cancelled on 4 May 2019 due to the global COVID-19 pandemic after 24 of the 30 matches had been played. No champion was declared. Salitas FC was leading the league at the time of the cancellation. No teams were relegated, but two teams, Vitesse FC and Léopards de St. Camille, were promoted from the second-tier Burkinabé Deuxième Division into the Premier League for the next season, as their season had already concluded by the time of cancellation.

== League table ==
Pos	Team	Pld	W	D	L	GF	GA	GD	Pts	Qualification or relegation
1	Salitas FC	24	16	3	5	38	15	+23	51	Qualification for Confederation Cup (Note: As 2018-19 league runners-up)
2	Majestic FC	24	13	6	5	30	20	+10	45	
3	Rahimo FC	24	12	5	7	27	23	+4	41	Qualification for Champions League (Note: As 2018-19 league champions)
4	ASF Bobo Dioulasso	24	11	7	6	30	17	+13	40	
5	AS Douanes	24	10	7	7	24	19	+5	37	
6	US des Forces Armées	24	10	5	9	29	24	+5	35	
7	ASFA Yennenga	24	8	10	6	23	20	+3	34	
8	RC Bobo Dioulasso	24	8	8	8	22	21	+1	32	
9	AS SONABEL	24	7	9	8	24	25	−1	30	
10	Étoile Filante de Ouagadougou	24	7	9	8	23	28	−5	30	
11	ASEC Koudougou	24	6	11	7	17	24	−7	29	
12	Kassoum Ouédraogo Zico Académie de Football	24	7	7	10	19	24	−5	28	
13	Royal FC de Bobo-Dioulasso	24	5	9	10	22	33	−11	24	
14	US Ouagadougou	24	5	8	11	19	30	−11	23	
15	Rail Club du Kadiogo	24	6	4	14	16	29	−13	22	
16	AS Police	24	4	6	14	19	30	−11	18	

Source: RSSSF
Rules for classification: 1) points; 2) goal difference; 3) goals scored; 4) head-to-head points; 5) head-to-head goal difference; 6) head-to-head goals scored.

== Stadiums ==
Team	Location	Stadium	Capacity
Salitas FC	Ouagadougou	Stade du 4 Août	60,000
Majestic FC	Ouagadougou	Stade Municipal (Ouagadougou)	25,000
Rahimo FC	Bobo-Dioulasso	Stade Wobi Bobo-Dioulasso	10,000
ASF Bobo Dioulasso	Bobo-Dioulasso	Stade Général Aboubacar Sangoulé Lamizana	40,000
AS Douanes (Burkina Faso)	Ouagadougou	Stade Municipal (Ouagadougou)	25,000
US des Forces Armées	Ouagadougou	Stade de l'USFA	9,000
ASFA Yennenga	Ouagadougou	Stade du 4 Août	60,000
RC Bobo Dioulasso	Bobo-Dioulasso	Stade Général Aboubacar Sangoulé Lamizana	40,000
AS SONABEL	Ouagadougou	Stade de la SONABEL	5,000
Étoile Filante de Ouagadougou	Ouagadougou	Stade du 4 Août	60,000
ASEC Koudougou	Koudougou	Stade Balibiè	5,000
KOZAF	Ouagadougou	Stade Municipal (Ouagadougou)	25,000
Royal FC de Bobo-Dioulasso	Bobo-Dioulasso	Stade Général Aboubacar Sangoulé Lamizana	40,000
US Ouagadougou	Ouagadougou	Stade Municipal (Ouagadougou)	25,000
Rail Club du Kadiogo	Ouagadougou	Stade Municipal (Ouagadougou)	25,000
AS Police (Ouagadougou)	Ouagadougou	Stade Municipal (Ouagadougou)	25,000

== Top scorers ==
Rank	Player	Club	Goals
1	(Burkina Faso) Alassane	ASF Bobo Dioulasso	9
2	(Burkina Faso) Saidou Sawadogo	ASFA Yennenga	8
2	(Burkina Faso) İbrahim Yameogo	EF Ouagadougou	8
2	(Nigeria) Michael Ibeh	Salitas FC	8
5	(Ivory Coast) Kouassi	ASFA Yennenga	7
5	(Burkina Faso) Abdoul Azíz		7
5	(Burkina Faso) Ismael Karambiri	Salitas FC	7
5	(Burkina Faso) Olio Michael Da	ASEC Koudougou	7
5	(Burkina Faso) Jean Emmanuel	Majestic FC	7
5	(Burkina Faso) Rodrigue Kam	AS Police	7
