= 2014–15 Burkinabé Premier League =

Burkinabé Premier League
- Season: 2014–15
- Champions: RC Bobo Dioulasso
- Relegated: Canon du Sud; Bobo Sport
- Matches: 240
- Biggest home win: USFA 5–0 Koudougou (3 January 2015)
- Biggest away win: ASFA 0-4 USFA (3 December 2014); Canon du Sud 0-4 SONABEL (6 December 2014); ASF Bobo Dioulasso 0-4 USFA (25 March 2015); Santos 0-4 RC Bobo Dioulasso (4 April 2015); ASFA 0-4 Ouagadougou (30 May 2015)

The 2014–15 Burkinabé Premier League is the 53rd edition of top flight football in Burkina Faso. A total of sixteen teams competed in the season beginning on 25 October 2014 and ending on 30 May 2015.

== Teams ==
- ASFA
- ASF Bobo Dioulasso
- Bankuy Sports
- Bobo Sport
- Canon du Sud
- Comoé
- Étoile Filante
- Kadiogo
- KOZAF
- BPS Koudougou
- Majestic
- Ouagadougou
- RC Bobo Dioulasso
- Santos
- SONABEL
- USFA

== League table ==
Pos	Team	Pld	W	D	L	GF	GA	GD	Pts	Qualification or relegation
1	RC Bobo Dioulasso (C)	30	18	6	6	44	17	+27	60	Qualification to the 2016 CAF Champions League
2	Étoile Filante	30	14	13	3	43	18	+25	55	
3	USFA	30	15	9	6	46	22	+24	54	
4	SONABEL	30	14	11	5	33	17	+16	53	
5	Ouagadougou	30	12	12	6	26	15	+11	48	
6	Kadiogo	30	13	9	8	30	22	+8	48	
7	KOZAF	30	10	10	10	21	23	−2	40	
8	ASFA	30	9	10	11	21	27	−6	37	
9	Majestic	30	8	10	12	22	30	−8	34	
10	ASF Bobo Dioulasso	30	7	11	12	9	21	−12	32	
11	BPS Koudougou	30	8	8	14	20	33	−13	32	
12	Comoé	30	6	13	11	17	28	−11	31	
13	Santos	30	6	13	11	18	32	−14	31	
14	Bankuy Sports	30	7	10	13	15	30	−15	31	
15	Bobo Sport (R)	30	5	12	13	15	29	−14	27	Relegation to the Burkinabé Second Division
16	Canon du Sud (R)	30	5	9	16	11	27	−16	24	Relegation to the Burkinabé Second Division

Updated to match(es) played on 30 May 2015. Source: Soccerway
Rules for classification: 1) points; 2) goal difference; 3) number of goals scored.
(C) Champions; (R) Relegated
