= 2017–18 Burkinabé Premier League =

Burkinabé Premier League
- Season: 2017–18
- Champions: ASF Bobo Dioulasso
- Top goalscorer: Djibril Ouattara (15 goals)

The 2017–18 Burkinabé Premier League is the 56th edition of top flight football in Burkina Faso. It began on 20 October 2017 and ended on 10 June 2018.

== Final standings ==
Pos	Team	Pld	W	D	L	GF	GA	GD	Pts
1	ASF Bobo Dioulasso (Q)	30	17	9	4	38	15	+23	60
2	Rail Club du Kadiogo	30	13	13	4	27	17	+10	52
3	Majestic SC	30	15	6	9	27	20	+7	51
4	Racing Club Bobo	30	13	10	7	31	22	+9	49
5	US Forces Armées	30	12	13	5	30	26	+4	49
6	Etoile Filante	30	12	12	6	28	16	+12	48
7	AS Sonabel	30	10	14	6	31	18	+13	44
8	US Comoé	30	10	10	10	21	21	0	40
9	Salitas FC	30	10	9	11	26	29	−3	39
10	AJEB	30	8	10	12	27	30	−3	34
11	Rahimo FC	30	7	13	10	14	18	−4	34
12	AS Faso/Yennenga	30	6	15	9	26	28	−2	33
13	Union Sportive de Ouagadougou	30	5	16	9	22	28	−6	31
14	AS Police	30	7	9	14	21	36	−15	30
15	Bobo Sport (R)	30	4	8	18	22	44	−22	20
16	Santos FC (R)	30	3	9	18	20	43	−23	18

Updated to match(es) played on unknown. Source:
(Q) Qualified for the phase indicated; (R) Relegated

== See also ==
- 2018 Coupe du Faso
