= 2004–05 Burkinabé Premier League =

Burkinabé Premier League
- Season: 2004–05
- Champions: RC Kadiogo
- Relegated: Sanmantenga FC
- Matches played: 182
- Top goalscorer: Wilfried Dah USFA (13 goals)
- Biggest home win: USO 5–0 ASEC-K (1 May 2005); USFA 5-0 Sanmantenga FC (8 June 2005)
- Biggest away win: JCB 0-4 ASFA (18 December 2004); JCB 0-4 USO (19 March 2005); SONABEL 0-4 ASFA-Y (6 April 2005); SONABEL 0-4 ÉFO (3 June 2005)
- Highest scoring: JC Bobo-Dioulasso 5–2 Sanmantenga FC (23 January 2005)

The 2004–05 Burkinabé Premier League is the 43rd edition of top flight football in Burkina Faso. A total of fourteen teams competed in the season beginning on 11 December 2004 and ending on 9 July 2005. Rail Club du Kadiogo were champions and Sanmantenga FC finished last and were relegated.

== Teams ==
- Association Sportive des Employés et Commerçants de Koudougou (ASEC-K) - Koudougou
- ASFA Yennenga (ASFA-Y) - Ouagadougou
- ASF Bobo Dioulasso (ASFB) - Bobo-Dioulasso
- US de la Comoé (USCO) - Banfora
- Étoile Filante de Ouagadougou (ÉFO) - Ouagadougou
- JC Bobo-Dioulasso (JCB) - Bobo-Dioulasso
- Rail Club du Kadiogo (RCK)
- US Ouagadougou (USO) - Ouagadougou
- RC Bobo Dioulasso (RCB) - Bobo-Dioulasso
- Sanmatenga FC - Kaya
- Santos FC - Ouagadougou
- AS SONABEL - Ouagadougou
- Union Sportive des Forces Armées (USFA) - Ouagadougou
- Union Sportive du Foyer de la Régie Abidjan-Niger (US FRAN) - Bobo-Dioulasso

== League table ==
Pos	Team	Pld	W	D	L	GF	GA	GD	Pts	Qualification
1	RCK (C)	26	16	9	1	38	8	+30	57	Qualification to the 2006 CAF Champions League
2	USO	26	14	8	4	38	13	+25	50	
3	USFA	26	15	5	6	48	25	+23	50	
4	ÉFO	26	14	5	7	36	15	+21	47	
5	ASFA-Y	26	13	7	6	40	20	+20	46	
6	Santos	26	11	9	6	30	22	+8	42	
7	USCO	26	9	10	7	23	23	0	37	
8	ASFB	26	9	7	10	26	25	+1	34	
9	RCB	26	9	6	11	28	28	0	33	
10	SONABEL	26	10	2	14	22	45	−23	32	
11	US FRAN	26	4	10	12	20	29	−9	22	
12	ASEC-K	26	3	10	13	12	41	−29	19	
13	JCB	26	2	8	16	19	55	−36	14	
14	Sanmatenga FC (R)	26	2	6	18	14	44	−30	12	

Updated to match(es) played on 11 July 2005. Source: RSSSF
Rules for classification: 1) points; 2) goal difference; 3) number of goals scored.
(C) Champions; (R) Relegated
