= 2015–16 Burkinabé Premier League =

Burkinabé Premier League
- Season: 2015–16
- Champions: RC Bobo Dioulasso
- Relegated: Bankuy Sports; Majestic
- Biggest home win: Santos 5–0 Bankuy Sports (24 February 2016)

The 2015–16 Burkinabé Premier League is the 54th edition of top flight football in Burkina Faso. A total of sixteen teams contested in the season which began on 20 November.

== Teams ==
- AJEB
- ASF Bobo Dioulasso
- ASFA
- Bankuy Sports
- Comoé
- Étoile Filante
- Kadiogo
- Koudougou
- KOZAF
- Majestic
- Ouagadougou
- RC Bobo Dioulasso
- Santos FC
- SONABEL
- USFA
- Yatenga

== League table ==
Pos	Team	Pld	W	D	L	GF	GA	GD	Pts	Qualification or relegation
1	RC Bobo Dioulasso	24	15	4	5	30	11	+19	49	Qualification to the 2017 CAF Champions League
2	Kadiogo	23	14	6	3	26	9	+17	48	
3	Ouagadougou	23	12	10	1	25	9	+16	46	
4	Koudougou	24	9	10	5	21	19	+2	37	
5	Santos FC	23	9	9	5	26	17	+9	36	
6	KOZAF	24	9	8	7	27	21	+6	35	
7	Étoile Filante	24	9	6	9	20	21	−1	33	
8	ASFA	23	8	5	10	18	21	−3	29	
9	USFA	23	7	8	8	18	21	−3	29	
10	AJEB	24	7	7	10	17	23	−6	28	
11	ASF Bobo Dioulasso	23	6	8	9	21	23	−2	26	
12	SONABEL	23	5	11	7	14	17	−3	26	
13	Comoé	24	4	13	7	7	15	−8	25	
14	Yatenga	24	5	6	13	13	27	−14	21	
15	Majestic	23	4	7	12	15	24	−9	19	Relegation to the Burkinabé Second Division
16	Bankuy Sports	24	2	8	14	10	30	−20	14	Relegation to the Burkinabé Second Division

Updated to match(es) played on 28 May 2016. Source: Soccerway
Rules for classification: 1) points; 2) goal difference; 3) number of goals scored.
