= Kamou Malo =

Burkinabé footballer and manager

Personal information
- Date of birth: 1963 (age 62–63)
- Place of birth: Upper Volta
- Position: Midfielder

Senior career*
Years	Team	Apps	(Gls)
1981–1986	US Ouagadougou		
1986–1992	Étoile Filante		

Managerial career
- Majestic
- 2010–2013: RC Kadiogo
- 2013–2015: AS SONABEL
- 2015–2018: RC Kadiogo
- 2018–2019: USFA
- 2019–2022: Burkina Faso
- * Club domestic league appearances and goals

Kamou Malo (born 1963) is a Burkinabé football manager and former player who has managed the Burkina Faso national team.

== Biography ==
Kamou Malo is a police officer by profession. While working in Ouagadougou, he rose to the rank of police captain and at the same time coached the police football team. He got the opportunity to go to Germany to start training as a coach and gave up his career as an official.

== Playing career ==
During his playing career, Malo played for Ouagadougou-based clubs US Ouagadougou and Étoile Filante.

== Managerial career ==
In 2010, after managing Majestic, Malo was appointed manager of RC Kadiogo. After a three-year period, Malo joined AS SONABEL. In 2015, Malo returned to Kadiogo. During his second spell at the club, Malo helped Kadiogo to win two Burkinabé Premier Leagues, in 2016 and 2017. In 2018, Malo joined USFA, finishing second in the league.

In July 2019, Malo was appointed manager of Burkina Faso. In the role of head coach of Burkina Faso he take the fourth place in 2021 Africa Cup of Nations but the Burkina Faso Football Federation decided not to renew the contract which expired in February 2022.

== Personal life ==
Malo's son, Patrick, is a current Burkina Faso international.

== Honours ==
RC Kadiogo

- Burkinabé Premier League: 2015–16, 2016–17
- Coupe du Faso: 2012
- Burkinabé SuperCup: 2012
