= 2016–17 Burkinabé Premier League =

Burkinabé Premier League
- Season: 2016–17
- Champions: Rail Club du Kadiogo

The 2016–17 Burkinabé Premier League is the 55th edition of top flight football in Burkina Faso. It began on 25 November 2016 and concluded on 30 July 2017.

== Standings ==
Pos	Team	Pld	W	D	L	GF	GA	GD	Pts	Qualification or relegation
1	Rail Club du Kadiogo (Ouagadougou)	30	16	11	3	46	21	+25	59	Champions
2	Etoile Filante (Ouagadougou)	30	14	12	4	29	15	+14	54	
3	Rahimo FC (Bobo-Dioulasso)	30	13	8	9	30	22	+8	47	
4	US des Forces Armées (Ouagadougou)	30	12	10	8	33	22	+11	46	
5	AS Police (Ouagadougou)	30	10	13	7	32	27	+5	43	
6	AJEB (Bobo-Dioulasso)	30	10	11	9	29	28	+1	41	
7	AS Fonctionnaires (Bobo-Dioulasso)	30	9	14	7	22	24	−2	41	
8	Majestic FC (Saponé)	30	9	13	8	23	29	−6	40	
9	US Ouagadougou	30	9	10	11	27	23	+4	37	
10	AS Sonabel (Ouagadougou)	30	9	10	11	25	24	+1	37	
11	AS Faso/Yennenga (Ouagadougou)	30	11	4	15	28	35	−7	37	
12	RC Bobo Dioulasso (Bobo-Dioulasso)	30	8	11	11	25	26	−1	35	
13	US Comoé (Banfora)	30	7	10	13	16	28	−12	31	
14	Santos FC (Ouagadougou)	30	6	12	12	16	29	−13	30	
15	Bouloumpoukou Sport FC (Koudougou)	30	7	9	14	12	28	−16	30	Relegated
16	KOZAF (Ouagadougou)	30	5	12	13	20	32	−12	27	Relegated
