= 2018–19 Burkinabé Premier League =

Burkinabé Premier League
- Season: 2018–19
- Champions: Rahimo FC
- Relegated: AJE de Bobo; US de la Comoé
- Top goalscorer: (Burkina Faso) Hassamy Sansan Bah (15 goals)
- Highest attendance: 4,500 ASFA Yennega vs Étoile Filante Ouagadougou

The 2018–19 Burkinabé Premier League is the 57th edition of the Burkinabé Premier League, the top-tier football league in Burkina Faso, since its establishment in 1961. It began on 31 August 2018.

== League table ==
Pos	Team	Pld	W	D	L	GF	GA	GD	Pts	Qualification or relegation
1	Rahimo FC	30	17	6	7	37	20	+17	57	Qualification for Champions League
2	Salitas FC	30	16	7	7	38	19	+19	55	Qualification for Confederation Cup (Note: As league runners-up (league champions Rahimo FC are Coupe du Faso winners).)
3	US des Forces Armées	30	13	9	8	31	22	+9	48	
4	ASEC Koudougou	30	12	9	9	29	21	+8	45	
5	Rail Club du Kadiogo	30	11	12	7	28	20	+8	45	
6	AS SONABEL	30	11	10	9	28	25	+3	43	
7	Majestic FC	30	10	13	7	25	22	+3	43	
8	RC Bobo Dioulasso	30	11	7	12	35	33	+2	40	
9	AS Douanes	30	9	11	10	23	27	−4	38	
10	ASF Bobo Dioulasso	30	9	10	11	33	33	0	37	
11	ASFA Yennenga	30	9	10	11	30	30	0	37	
12	US Ouagadougou	30	9	8	13	22	34	−12	35	
13	Étoile Filante de Ouagadougou	30	8	10	12	30	28	+2	34	
14	AS Police	30	8	10	12	18	25	−7	34	
15	US de la Comoé	30	8	10	12	26	42	−16	34	Relegation
16	AJE de Bobo	30	3	10	17	14	46	−32	19	Relegation

Source: Soccerway
Rules for classification: 1) points; 2) goal difference; 3) goals scored; 4) head-to-head points; 5) head-to-head goal difference; 6) head-to-head goals scored.

== Top scorers ==
Rank	Player	Club	Goals
1	(Burkina Faso) Hassamy Sansan Bah	RC Bobo Dioulasso	15
2	(Burkina Faso) Michel Batiebo	ASF Bobo Dioulasso	13
3	(Burkina Faso) Issouf Zonon	RC Bobo Dioulasso	11
4	(Togo) Foovi Aguidi	Salitas FC	10
4	(Burkina Faso) Andre Yameogo	ASEC Koudougou	10
4	(Burkina Faso) Stephane	EF Ouagadougou	10
7	(Burkina Faso) Djibril Cheick	RC Bobo Dioulasso	8
7	(Ivory Coast) Kouassi	ASFA Yennenga	8
7	(Togo) Ashraf Agoro	US des Forces Armées	8
7	(Burkina Faso) Mody Cissé	Rahimo FC	8
