= Aboubacar Sidiki Traoré =

Burkinabe footballer

Aboubacar Traoré
Personal information
- Full name: Aboubacar Sidiki Traoré
- Date of birth: 10 December 1992 (age 33)
- Place of birth: Ouagadougou, Burkina Faso
- Position: Midfielder

Senior career*
Years	Team	Apps	(Gls)
2011–2012	AS SONABEL		
2013–2014	Étoile Filante de Ouagadougou		
2014–2016	Horoya AC		
2016–2017	Rail Club du Kadiogo		
2017–2018	Wadi Degla	4	(0)
2018–2021	Salitas	36+	(10)
2021–2022	AS Douanes	15	(0)
2022–2023	Rail Club du Kadiogo	27	(0)
2023–2024	Salitas	6	(0)
2024	Majestic	11	(0)
2024–2025	ASFA Yennega	22	(0)

International career
2009	Burkina Faso U17	4	(0)
2009	Burkina Faso U18	1	(0)
2013–2017	Burkina Faso	8	(0)
- * Club domestic league appearances and goals

Aboubacar Sidiki Traoré (born 10 December 1992) is a Burkinabé former professional footballer.

== International career ==
In January 2014, coach Brama Traore invited him to be a part of the Burkina Faso squad for the 2014 African Nations Championship. The team was eliminated in the group stages after losing to Uganda and Zimbabwe and then drawing with Morocco.

His final cap came in 2017 during a 2–2 draw against Ghana during 2018 African Nations Championship qualification.

== Career statistics ==
=== International ===
Appearances and goals by national team and year
National team	Year	Apps	Goals
Burkina Faso	2013	4	0
Burkina Faso	2014	3	0
Burkina Faso	2015	0	0
Burkina Faso	2016	0	0
Burkina Faso	2017	1	0
Total		8	0

== Honours ==
AS SONABEL

- Burkinabé Premier League: 2011–12

Étoile Filante de Ouagadougou

- Burkinabé Premier League: 2012–13

Horoya AC

- Guinée Championnat National: 2014–15, 2015–16
- Guinée Coupe Nationale: 2016; runner-up 2015
- Guinean Super Cup: 2016

Rail Club du Kadiogo

- Burkinabé Premier League: 2016–17

Majestic

- Burkinabé Premier League: runner-up 2023–24
