= Seydou Zerbo =

Burkinabé football manager (born 1963)

Personal information
- Date of birth: 1 June 1963 (age 63)
- Place of birth: Burkina Faso

Managerial career
- Years: Team
- Commune FC
- Rail Club du Kadiogo
- Santos FC
- Étoile Filante de Ouagadougou
- Bankuy Sport de Dédougou
- AS SONABEL
- ASFA Yennenga
- 2019–2021: Burkina Faso (local)
- 2022–2023: Asante Kotoko SC
- 2024–: CNSS Sport

Seydou Zerbo (born 1 June 1963) is a Burkinabé football manager who manages CNSS Sport.

== Career ==
Nicknamed "Krol" after Netherlands international Ruud Krol, Zerbo worked as manager of Burkinabé side Commune FC, helping the club win their first league title. After that, he was appointed manager of Burkinabé side Rail Club du Kadiogo, before being appointed manager of Burkinabé side Santos FC. Following his stint there, he was appointed manager of Burkinabé side Étoile Filante de Ouagadougou, helping the club win the 2011 Coupe du Faso. Subsequently, he worked as manager of Burkinabé sides Bankuy Sport de Dédougou, AS SONABEL, and ASFA Yennenga.

In 2019, he was appointed manager of the Burkina Faso local-based national football team and managed the team at the 2020 African Nations Championship. However, they finished third out of four teams in their group so did not reach the knockout stages of the tournament. Two years later, he was appointed manager of Ghanaian side Asante Kotoko SC. Another two years later, he was appointed manager of Beninese side CNSS Sport.

== Management style ==
While managing teams, Zerbo has preferred to use the 4–2–3–1 formation. Cameroonian newspaper Cameroon Tribune wrote that "[Zerbo] knows how to make himself heard. Rigorous, he especially places a point of honor on discipline on and off the field".
