= Football at the 2019 African Games – Men's team squads =

The following is a list of squads for each nation competing in men's football at the 2019 African Games in Rabat. Each team had to name a final squad of 18 players (two of whom must be goalkeepers).

The nationality for each club reflects the national association (not the league) to which the club is affiliated. A flag is included for coaches that are of a different nationality than their own national team. Those marked in bold have been capped at full International level.

== Group A ==
=== Morocco ===
Head coach: Jamal Salami

The final squad was announced on 12 August 2019.

No.	Pos.	Player	Date of birth (age)	Club
	GK	Taha Mourid	4 March 2002 (aged 17)	(Royal Moroccan Football Federation) Wydad AC
	GK	Abderrahmane Kernane	24 February 2000 (aged 19)	(Royal Moroccan Football Federation) Olympique Khouribga
	DF	Ibrahim Chahir	1 January 2001 (aged 18)	(Royal Moroccan Football Federation) Olympique Khouribga
	DF	Mohamed Moufid	12 January 2000 (aged 19)	(Royal Moroccan Football Federation) ASFAR
	DF	Mohssine Abba	15 August 2000 (aged 19)	(Royal Moroccan Football Federation) ASFAR
	DF	Abdelilah Madkour	11 June 2000 (aged 19)	(Royal Moroccan Football Federation) Raja Casablanca
	DF	Hamza Bousqal	24 March 2001 (aged 18)	(Royal Moroccan Football Federation) Mohammed VI Football Academy
	DF	Aymane Mourid	7 May 2000 (aged 19)	(Royal Spanish Football Federation) CD Leganés
	MF	El Mehdi El Moubarik	22 January 2001 (aged 18)	(Royal Moroccan Football Federation) Fath Union Sport
	MF	Khalid Ait Ouarkhane	22 April 2000 (aged 19)	(Royal Moroccan Football Federation) ASFAR
	MF	Driss Bousbaa	30 January 2000 (aged 19)	(Royal Moroccan Football Federation) Fath Union Sport
	MF	Zakaria Driouach	11 January 2001 (aged 18)	(Royal Moroccan Football Federation) Raja Casablanca
	MF	Ayoub Khairi	16 February 2000 (aged 19)	(Royal Moroccan Football Federation) Raja Casablanca
	MF	Ismail Moutaraji	1 February 2000 (aged 19)	(Royal Moroccan Football Federation) SCC Mohammédia
	MF	Mohamed Askender	12 January 2000 (aged 19)	(Royal Moroccan Football Federation) Difaâ Hassani El Jadidi
	FW	Bilal El Ouadghiri	3 August 2001 (aged 18)	(Royal Moroccan Football Federation) MAS Fez
	FW	Abdelilah Damar	11 February 2000 (aged 19)	(Royal Spanish Football Federation) UE Cornellà
	FW	Saifeddine Bouhra	5 March 2000 (aged 19)	(Royal Moroccan Football Federation) Rapide Oued Zem

=== Burkina Faso ===
Head coach: Oscar Barro

The preliminary 24-men squad was announced on 2 August 2019.

No.	Pos.	Player	Date of birth (age)	Club
	GK	François Bamouni	4 October 2000 (aged 18)	(Burkinabé Football Federation) Majestic
	GK	Zegue Traoré	31 December 1999 (aged 19)	(Burkinabé Football Federation) USFA
	DF	Ali Bathié	31 December 2000 (aged 18)	(Burkinabé Football Federation) Salitas
	DF	Ben Aziz Dao	8 July 1999 (aged 20)	(Guinean Football Federation) AS Kaloum
	DF	Ibrahim Ouattara	15 September 2000 (aged 18)	(Burkinabé Football Federation) KOZAF
	DF	Kalifa Nikiema	31 December 2000 (aged 18)	(Burkinabé Football Federation) Salitas
	DF	Issiaka Ouédraogo	10 June 2000 (aged 19)	(Burkinabé Football Federation) AS Douanes
	DF	Moustapha Ouédraogo	31 December 2001 (aged 17)	(Burkinabé Football Federation) AS Douanes
	MF	Ben Sidibe Daouda	29 October 1999 (aged 19)	(Burkinabé Football Federation) RC Bobo Dioulasso
	MF	Ibrahim Touré	4 September 1999 (aged 19)	(Burkinabé Football Federation) RC Bobo Dioulasso
	MF	Ismahila Ouédraogo	25 November 1999 (aged 19)	(Burkinabé Football Federation) AS Douanes
	MF	Abdoul Yoda	20 December 2000 (aged 18)	(Burkinabé Football Federation) USFA
	MF	Bassory Tanou	1 January 2000 (aged 19)	(Burkinabé Football Federation) AS Douanes
	FW	Elliass Dianda	8 August 2000 (aged 19)	(Burkinabé Football Federation) Salitas
	FW	Nathanio Kompaoré	20 June 2001 (aged 18)	(Burkinabé Football Federation) Salitas
	FW	Djibril Ouattara	19 September 1999 (aged 19)	(Royal Moroccan Football Federation) RS Berkane
	FW	Hamed Ouattara	16 December 2001 (aged 17)	(Burkinabé Football Federation) RC Bobo Dioulasso
	FW	Hugo Passega	20 September 2000 (aged 18)	(Danish Football Association) Næstved

=== Nigeria ===
Head coach: Paul Aigbogun

The final squad was announced on 12 August 2019.

No.	Pos.	Player	Date of birth (age)	Club
	GK	Detan Ogundare	8 December 2000 (aged 18)	(Nigeria Football Federation) Kogi United
	GK	Mathew Yakubu	3 September 1999 (aged 19)	(Nigeria Football Federation) Clique Sports
	DF	Zulkifilu Rabiu	1 January 2002 (aged 17)	(Nigeria Football Federation) Plateau United
	DF	Mike Zaruma	16 April 2002 (aged 17)	(Nigeria Football Federation) Plateau United
	DF	Habibu Sadiq	31 August 2000 (aged 18)	(Nigeria Football Federation) Rarara
	DF	Victor Eteng	8 June 1999 (aged 20)	(Nigeria Football Federation) Sidos
	DF	Abdulmutallif Sanusi	12 May 2001 (aged 18)	(Nigeria Football Federation) Katsina United
	MF	Peter Eletu	24 January 2000 (aged 19)	(Nigeria Football Federation) Prince Kazeem FC
	MF	Adewale Oladoye	25 August 2001 (aged 17)	(Nigeria Football Federation) Water FC
	MF	Quadri Liameed	8 April 2002 (aged 17)	(Nigeria Football Federation) 36 Lion Soccer Academy
	MF	Samuel Nnoshiri	2 July 2001 (aged 18)	(Nigeria Football Federation) Heartland
	MF	Abubakar Ibrahim	24 January 2000 (aged 19)	(Nigeria Football Federation) Plateau United
	FW	Chinonso Emeka	30 August 2001 (aged 17)	(The Football Association) Brook House FC
	FW	Success Makanjuola	24 May 2001 (aged 18)	(Nigeria Football Federation) Water FC
	FW	Yira Sor	24 July 2000 (aged 19)	(Nigeria Football Federation) 36 Lion Soccer Academy
	FW	Saeed Jibril	20 May 2001 (aged 18)	(Nigeria Football Federation) Plateau United
	FW	Ahmad Ghali	23 June 2001 (aged 18)	(Nigeria Football Federation) MFM
	FW	Gata Adeshina	8 February 1999 (aged 20)	(Nigeria Football Federation) Wikki Tourists

=== South Africa ===
Head coach: Helman Mkhalele

The final squad was announced on 15 August 2019.

No.	Pos.	Player	Date of birth (age)	Club
	GK	Glen Baadjies	27 March 2000 (aged 19)	(South African Football Association) Mamelodi Sundowns
	GK	Buhle Damane	9 February 2000 (aged 19)	(Portuguese Football Federation) Vitória
	DF	Brendon Moloisane	24 February 1999 (aged 20)	(South African Football Association) Mamelodi Sundowns
	DF	Fezile Gcaba	3 March 1999 (aged 20)	(South African Football Association) Pele Pele
	DF	Siyanda Msani	20 December 1999 (aged 19)	(South African Football Association) Mamelodi Sundowns
	DF	Sphiwe Nkabinde	2 November 2002 (aged 16)	(South African Football Association) Stars of Africa Academy
	DF	Thabo Molea	12 April 2000 (aged 19)	(South African Football Association) Jomo Cosmos
	DF	Mohammed Shahabodien	4 January 2002 (aged 17)	(South African Football Association) Stars of Africa Academy
	MF	Anele Magala	28 January 2002 (aged 17)	(South African Football Association) Virginia Sports Academy
	MF	Randzilani Ndamuleo		(South African Football Association) SuperSport United
	MF	Ofentse Mashiane	22 May 2002 (aged 17)	(South African Football Association) Mamelodi Sundowns
	MF	Dante Brown	4 February 2002 (aged 17)	(South African Football Association) Ajax Cape Town
	MF	Katlego Mashigo	22 January 2001 (aged 18)	(Football Association of Ireland) Bohemian
	MF	Onke Moletshe	7 February 2000 (aged 19)	(South African Football Association) Jomo Cosmos
	MF	Siph Mdlalose	28 January 1999 (aged 20)	(The Football Association) Southampton
	FW	Katlego Cwinyana	3 January 2001 (aged 18)	(South African Football Association) Pele Pele
	FW	Sechaba Tsoaela	13 September 2001 (aged 17)	(South African Football Association) Virginia Sports Academy
	FW	Junior Nare	5 April 2002 (aged 17)	(South African Football Association) Bidvest Wits

== Group B ==
=== Burundi ===
Head coach: Omar Ntakagero

The 24-man preliminary squad was announced on 1 August 2019.

No.	Pos.	Player	Date of birth (age)	Club
1	GK	Joseph Rugerinyange	15 July 2002 (aged 17)	(Football Federation of Burundi) Vital'O
2	DF	Eric Ndoriyobija	17 May 1999 (aged 20)	(Rwanda Football Federation) Police
3	MF	Omari Nzeyimana	31 January 2001 (aged 18)	(Football Federation of Burundi) Bumamuru
4	FW	Mohamed Amissi	3 August 2000 (aged 19)	(Royal Dutch Football Association) Heracles Almelo
5	DF	Hassan Ndima	1 March 2000 (aged 19)	(Football Federation of Burundi) Delta Star
6	MF	Eric Mbirizi	20 April 1998 (aged 21)	(Football Federation of Burundi) Inter Star
7	MF	Magloire Ndikumana	1 January 1999 (aged 20)	(Rwanda Football Federation) Police
8	MF	Thérence Rukundo	12 March 1999 (aged 20)	(Football Federation of Burundi) Kayanza United
9	FW	Abdi Ndayikeza	24 March 2002 (aged 17)	(Football Federation of Burundi) Kayanza United
10	FW	Olivier Dusabe	5 October 2001 (aged 17)	(Football Federation of Burundi) Vital'O
11	FW	Cédric Mavugo	10 October 1999 (aged 19)	(Football Federation of Burundi) Aigle Noir
12	DF	Ramadhan Bigirimana	20 December 1999 (aged 19)	(Football Federation of Burundi) Kayanza United
13	GK	Onésime Rukundo	9 April 1999 (aged 20)	(Football Federation of Burundi) Le Messager
14	MF	Iddy Karikumutima	5 December 2000 (aged 18)	(Football Federation of Burundi) Olympique Star
15	DF	Eric Ndizeye	22 August 1999 (aged 19)	(Football Federation of Burundi) Musongati
16	DF	Joseph Kashindi	20 December 1999 (aged 19)	(Football Federation of Burundi) Rukinzo
17	DF	Abdallah Ntumbaze	31 January 2001 (aged 18)	(Football Federation of Burundi) Les Lierres
18	DF	Issa Havyarimana	4 April 1999 (aged 20)	(Football Federation of Burundi) Les Lierres

=== Ghana ===
Head coach: Yaw Preko

The final squad was announced on 14 August 2019.

No.	Pos.	Player	Date of birth (age)	Club
1	GK	Ibrahim Danlad	2 December 2002 (aged 16)	(Ghana Football Association) Asante Kotoko
2	DF	Amoah Kobina	1 January 2001 (aged 18)	(Ghana Football Association) Golden Kick
3	DF	Philip Osei	28 August 2001 (aged 17)	(Ghana Football Association) Medeama
4	DF	Abubakar Haruna	1 January 2001 (aged 18)	(Ghana Football Association) King Faisal Babes
5	DF	Najeeb Yakubu	1 May 2000 (aged 19)	(Ukrainian Association of Football) Vorskla Poltava
6	MF	Ibrahim Sulley	6 July 2001 (aged 18)	(Ghana Football Association) Rising Stars of Africa
7	MF	Ibrahim Issah	25 December 2000 (aged 18)	(Ghana Football Association) Dreams
8	MF	Isaac Gyamfi	9 September 2000 (aged 18)	(Ghana Football Association) New Life
9	FW	Basit Umar	21 December 1999 (aged 19)	(Ghana Football Association) New Edubiase United
10	FW	Emmanuel Toku	10 July 2000 (aged 19)	(Portuguese Football Federation) Boavista
11	FW	Kwadwo Opoku	13 July 2001 (aged 18)	(Ghana Football Association) Attram de Visser
12	MF	Anim Mathew	18 June 2000 (aged 19)	(Ghana Football Association) Great Somas
13	DF	Daniel Adjetey	15 March 2000 (aged 19)	(Danish Football Association) Næstved
14	FW	Elvis Kyei Baffour	7 February 1999 (aged 20)	(Ghana Football Association) Liberty Professionals
15	DF	Adams Mohammed	11 November 2000 (aged 18)	(Ghana Football Association) Liberty Professionals
16	GK	Fredrick Asare	28 May 1999 (aged 20)	(Ghana Football Association) Accra Lions
17	FW	Tahiru Awudu	10 March 2000 (aged 19)	(Ghana Football Association) Medeama
18	GK	Appiah Kubi	11 January 2001 (aged 18)	(Ghana Football Association) Asante Kotoko

=== Mali ===
Head coach: Mamoutou Kané

The final squad was announced on 14 August 2019.

No.	Pos.	Player	Date of birth (age)	Club
	GK	Alkalifa Coulibaly	3 December 2001 (aged 17)	(Malian Football Federation) Onze Créateurs
	GK	Yacouba Coulibaly	18 April 2000 (aged 19)	(Malian Football Federation) Étoiles du Mandé
	DF	Hamidou Diallo	26 January 2002 (aged 17)	(Malian Football Federation) Derby
	DF	Moussa Diarra	20 January 2002 (aged 17)	(Malian Football Federation) Derby
	DF	Babou Fofana	10 April 1999 (aged 20)	(Malian Football Federation) Stade Malien
	DF	Felix Kamaté	31 December 2000 (aged 18)	(Malian Football Federation) AS Real Bamako
	DF	Samba Koné	22 March 2002 (aged 17)	(Malian Football Federation) Derby
	DF	Bakary Samaké	13 September 1999 (aged 19)	(Malian Football Federation) AS Real Bamako
	MF	Mady Dembélé	16 March 2000 (aged 19)	(Malian Football Federation) Racine
	MF	Chaka Ballo	1 January 2000 (aged 19)	(Malian Football Federation) Black Stars
	MF	Seydou Diakité	27 March 2001 (aged 18)	(Malian Football Federation) Stade Malien
	MF	Moussa Traoré	10 January 1999 (aged 20)	(Malian Football Federation) Racine
	MF	Ibrahim Sangaré	11 July 2001 (aged 18)	(Malian Football Federation) AS Real Bamako
	FW	Souleymane Dramé	1 January 1999 (aged 20)	(Malian Football Federation) FC Lakika
	FW	Malick Koumaré	29 October 2000 (aged 18)	(Malian Football Federation) Centre Salif Keita
	FW	Oumar Tangara	4 May 2000 (aged 19)	(Malian Football Federation) AS Bamako
	FW	Abdoulaye Kanou	7 October 2000 (aged 18)	(Malian Football Federation) FC Diarra
	FW	Issouf Sissokho	30 January 2002 (aged 17)	(Malian Football Federation) Derby

=== Senegal ===
Head coach: Youssoupha Dabo

The final squad was announced on 13 August 2019.

No.	Pos.	Player	Date of birth (age)	Club
	GK	François Djiba	23 November 2000 (aged 18)	(Senegalese Football Federation) Diambars
	GK	Pape Dione	20 March 2004 (aged 15)	(Senegalese Football Federation) AF Darou Salam
	DF	Moussa Ndiaye	18 July 2002 (aged 17)	(Senegalese Football Federation) Excellence Foot
	DF	Birame Diaw	1 May 2003 (aged 16)	(Senegalese Football Federation) Galaxy Sport
	DF	Bacary Sané	24 December 2002 (aged 16)	(Senegalese Football Federation) Diambars
	DF	Abdoulaye Ndiaye	10 April 2002 (aged 17)	(Senegalese Football Federation) AS Dakar Sacré-Cœur
	DF	Bakary Goudiaby	4 November 2001 (aged 17)	(Senegalese Football Federation) Guédiawaye
	DF	Ibrahima Baldé	1 February 2002 (aged 17)	(Senegalese Football Federation)
	DF	Cheikhou Ndiaye	25 January 2002 (aged 17)	(Senegalese Football Federation) Génération Foot
	MF	Mamadou Camara	5 January 2003 (aged 16)	(Senegalese Football Federation) AF Darou Salam
	MF	Baye War	4 July 2001 (aged 18)	(Senegalese Football Federation) Génération Foot
	MF	**Pape Matar Sarr**	14 September 2002 (aged 16)	(Senegalese Football Federation) Génération Foot
	MF	**Ibrahima Dramé**	6 October 2001 (aged 17)	(Senegalese Football Federation) Diambars
	MF	Samba Diallo	5 January 2003 (aged 16)	(Senegalese Football Federation) AF Darou Salam
	MF	**Dion Lopy**	2 February 2002 (aged 17)	(Senegalese Football Federation) Oslo Football Academy
	FW	**Youssouph Badji**	20 December 2001 (aged 17)	(Senegalese Football Federation) Casa Sports
	FW	**Mamadou Danfa**	6 March 2001 (aged 18)	(Senegalese Football Federation) Casa Sports
	FW	Ousseynou Niang	12 October 2001 (aged 17)	(Senegalese Football Federation) Diambars
