= Dramane Salou =

Burkinabé footballer

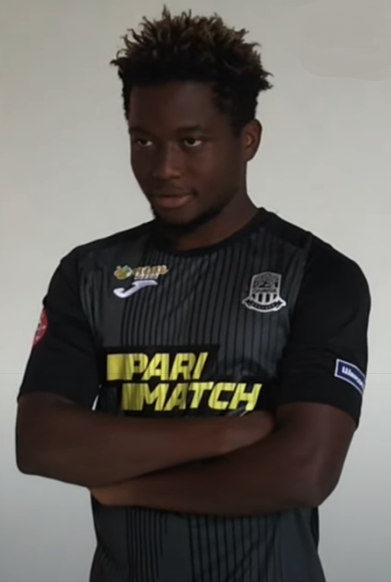
- Dramane Salou with Olimpik Donetsk in 2019

Personal information
- Date of birth: 22 May 1998 (age 28)
- Place of birth: Ouagadougou, Burkina Faso
- Height: 1.75 m (5 ft 9 in)
- Position: Defensive midfielder

Team information
- Current team: Churchill Brothers
- Number: 5

Youth career
- –2015: Salitas

Senior career*
Years	Team	Apps	(Gls)
2015–2017	Salitas		
2016–2017	→ USFA (loan)		
2018–2019	Partizan	0	(0)
2018	→ Teleoptik (loan)	18	(0)
2019	Olimpik Donetsk	7	(0)
2020	Slutsk	13	(1)
2020–2021	Pyunik	20	(0)
2021–2022	Salitas	11	(1)
2022	Noah	31	(3)
2023–2024	Urartu	40	(3)
2024–2025	Hapoel Haifa	33	(1)
2025–2026	Dinamo Samarqand	8	(0)
2026–	Churchill Brothers	4	(0)

International career^{‡}
2016–2017	Burkina Faso U20		
2017–	Burkina Faso	9	(0)
- * Club domestic league appearances and goals as of 5 November 2026 ‡ National team caps and goals as of 7 November 2025

Dramane Salou (born 22 May 1998) is a Burkinabé professional footballer who plays as a defensive midfielder for Indian Super League club Churchill Brothers and the Burkina Faso national team.

== Club career ==
Born in Ouagadougou, Salou has started his career with the local football club Salitas. Having played with academy until 2016, Salou was loaned to US des Forces Armées for the 2016–17 Burkinabé Premier League campaign, where he made his first appearances in the top tier of the Burkinabé football pyramid. Returning from loan deal, Salou joined the first team of his home club, Salitas, which was promoted to the top-level league previously. Scoring 3 goals and making 5 assists, he was elected for the best footballer in the domestic competition in November 2017. Thus he received 100k CFA as a reward.

Passing a trial period with the club at the beginning of 2018, Salou signed a four-year contract with the Serbian SuperLiga side Partizan on 1 February same year. In summer 2018, Salou moved on loan to the satellite club, Teleoptik, for the 2018–19 Serbian First League campaign. After a year and a half, Partizan decided to terminate the cooperation with Salou without making his debut for the club in any official competition.

On 15 August 2020, FC Pyunik announced the signing of Salou from Slutsk.

On 20 February 2022, Salou returned to Armenia, singing of FC Noah. On 7 February 2023, Salou terminated his contract with Noah by mutual agreement.

On 14 February 2023, Urartu announced the signing of Salou. On 31 May 2024, Salou left Urartu after his contract expired.

On 4 July 2024, Hapoel Haifa announced the signing of Salou to a one-year contract.

== International career ==
Salou was a member of youth national team, being elected in a group of players, available to play in 2017 Africa U-20 Cup of Nations qualification. Following the games in top tier Burkinabé league, Salou was called into the Burkina Faso national football team, making an official debut in 1–1 friendly draw to Benin on 4 May 2017.

== Playing style ==
Standing at 5-foot-9-inches (1.75 m), Salou mainly operates as a defensive midfielder. Although he was "strictly defensive oriented" in early years of his career due to insufficient of weight and stamina, while growing, he has converted in more offensive midfielder. Playing in the Burkinabé Premier League, Salou affirmed himself as an assistant and goal poacher, which put him among the most prospective players in the competition.

== Career statistics ==
=== Club ===
As of match played 20 May 2021

Appearances and goals by club, season and competition
Club	Season	League			National Cup		Continental		Other		Total	
Club	Season	Division	Apps	Goals	Apps	Goals	Apps	Goals	Apps	Goals	Apps	Goals
Partizan	2017–18	Serbian SuperLiga	0	0	0	0	0 (Note: Zero appearances in the UEFA Champions League, and zero appearances and in the UEFA Europa League)	0	—		0	0
Partizan	2018–19	Serbian SuperLiga	0	0	0	0	0 (Note: Appearances in the UEFA Europa League)	0	—		0	0
Partizan	Total		0	0	0	0	0	0	0	0	0	0
Teleoptik (loan)	2018–19	Serbian First League	18	0	1	0	—		—		18	0
Olimpik Donetsk	2019–20	Ukrainian Premier League	7	0	1	0	—		—		7	0
Slutsk	2020	Belarusian Premier League	13	1	0	0	—		—		13	1
Pyunik	2020–21	Armenian Premier League	20	0	2	0	—		—		22	0
Career total			58	1	4	0	—		—		62	1

=== International ===
As of match played 12 June 2021

Burkina Faso
Year	Apps	Goals
2017	1	0
2018	0	0
2019	0	0
2020	0	0
2021	1	0
Total	2	0

== Honours ==
=== Club ===
Urartu

- Armenian Premier League: 2022–23
- Armenian Cup: 2022–23

Salitas

- Coupe du Faso: 2018

Partizan

- Serbian Cup: 2018
