= Issoufou Dayo =

Burkinabé footballer (born 1991)

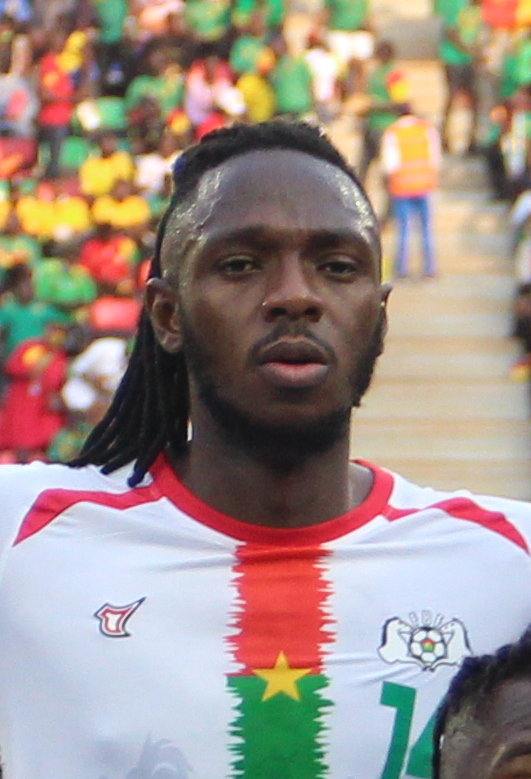
- Dayo with Burkina Faso in 2022

Personal information
- Full name: Issoufou Sellsavon Dayo
- Date of birth: 6 August 1991 (age 35)
- Place of birth: Bobo-Dioulasso, Burkina Faso
- Height: 1.87 m (6 ft 2 in)
- Position: Centre-back

Team information
- Current team: Wydad AC

Senior career*
Years	Team	Apps	(Gls)
2011–2013	RC Bobo Dioulasso		
2013–2014	Étoile Filante de Ouagadougou		
2014–2016	AS Vita Club		
2016–2025	RS Berkane	209	(49)
2025–2026	Umm Salal	7	(0)
2026–	Wydad AC	0	(0)

International career^{‡}
2012–	Burkina Faso	82	(9)
Medal record
Men's football
Representing Burkina Faso
Africa Cup of Nations
Third place	2017 Gabon
- * Club domestic league appearances and goals as of 09 September 2026 ‡ National team caps and goals as of 10 October 2024

Issoufou Sellsavon Dayo (born 6 August 1991) is a Burkinabé professional footballer who plays as a centre-back for Wydad AC and the Burkina Faso national team.

== Club career ==
Dayo played for RC Bobo Dioulasso and Étoile Filante de Ouagadougou in Benin, then for AS Vita Club in Congo DR, before joining RS Berkane in Morocco. On 25 October 2020, he scored the winning goal for RS Berkane in a 1–0 victory over Egyptian club Pyramids FC in the 2020 CAF Confederation Cup Final.

== International career ==
In January 2014, coach Brama Traore, invited him to be a part of the Burkina Faso squad for the 2014 African Nations Championship. The team was eliminated in the group stages after losing to Uganda and Zimbabwe and then drawing with Morocco. He was part of the squad in the 2017 Africa Cup of Nations which was his first Africa Cup with Burkina Faso. In the team's first game he scored a 75th-minute equalizer to gain a point for his nation.

Dayo was part of the Burkina Faso squad at the 2021, 2023 and 2025 Africa Cup of Nations. He featured in the AFCON 2021 third-place match against Cameroon.

== Career statistics ==
Scores and results list Burkina Faso's goal tally first, score column indicates score after each Dayo goal.

List of international goals scored by Issoufou Dayo
No.	Date	Venue	Opponent	Score	Result	Competition
1	14 January 2017	Stade d'Angondjé, Libreville, Gabon	Cameroon	1–1	1–1	2017 Africa Cup of Nations
2	18 November 2018	Estádio 11 de Novembro, Luanda, Angola	Angola	1–2	1–2	2019 Africa Cup of Nations qualification
3	9 October 2020	Stade El Abdi, El Jadida, Morocco	DR Congo	3–0	3–0	Friendly
4	11 October 2021	Stade de Marrakech, Marrakesh, Morocco	Djibouti	1–0	2–0	2022 FIFA World Cup qualification
5	12 November 2021	Stade de Marrakech, Marrakesh, Morocco	Niger	1–1	1–1	2022 FIFA World Cup qualification
6	16 November 2021	Mustapha Tchaker Stadium, Blida, Algeria	Algeria	2–2	2–2	2022 FIFA World Cup qualification
7	27 September 2022	Père Jégo Stadium, Casablanca, Morocco	Comoros	1–0	2–1	Friendly
8	18 June 2023	Estádio Nacional de Cabo Verde, Praia, Cape Verde	Cape Verde	1–1	1–3	2023 Africa Cup of Nations qualification
9	10 October 2024	Alassane Ouattara Stadium, Abidjan, Ivory Coast	Burundi	4–1	4–1	2025 Africa Cup of Nations qualification

== Honours ==
Étoile Filante de Ouagadougou

- Burkinabé Premier League: 2013–14

AS Vita Club

- Linafoot: 2014–15

RS Berkane

- Botola Pro: 2024–25
- Moroccan Throne Cup: 2017–18, 2020–21, 2021–22; runner-up: 2024–25
- CAF Confederation Cup: 2019–20, 2021–22, 2024–25; runner-up: 2018–19, 2023–24
- CAF Super Cup: 2022

Burkina Faso

- Africa Cup of Nations third place: 2017

Individual

- Botola Pro Best Foreign Player of the Season: 2021–22
- Burkina Faso Player of the Year: 2022–23, 2024–25

Records

- RS Berkane all-time top scorer: 49 goals
