= Football in Burkina Faso =

- Country: Burkina Faso
- Governing body: Burkinabé Football Federation
- National team: men's national team

National competitions
- Coupe du Faso; Burkinabé SuperCup

Club competitions
- Première Division

International competitions
- Champions League; CAF Confederation Cup; Super Cup; FIFA Club World Cup; FIFA World Cup (National Team); African Cup of Nations (National Team)

Football is the most popular sport in Burkina Faso. Approximately 35% of the people in Burkina Faso are considered association football fans. Neighbouring countries with a relative comparable percentage are Benin, Mali and Niger.

The national association can look back on recent developments with a great deal of pride. Reaching the semi-finals of the African Cup of Nations on home soil in 1998, reaching the knockout stage for their first FIFA World Youth Championship in 2003, and appearances at two final competitions of the CAF U-17 Cup, as well as third place at the FIFA U-17 World Championship in Trinidad and Tobago in 2001 are the country's outstanding achievements at international level. The nations most famous players include Kassoum Ouegraogo, nicknamed Zico, who had his most successful seasons with Espérance de Tunis before ending his career in Germany, Siaka Ouattara, who spent his entire career with Mulhouse in France, and Moumouni Dagano, who was voted best African player in Belgium in 2001, when he played for the Belgian side Genk. He later went on to play for the French side Guingamp before transferring to another French team, FC Sochaux in 2005. Burkina Faso received an unexpected free pass into the group stage of the 2006 FIFA World Cup qualification process, when their opening round contestant, the Central African Republic, withdrew from the competition. This gave the West Africans, who were at that stage ranked 14th on the continent, the certainty that their name would be in the hat when the Preliminary Draw for the 2006 FIFA World Cup in Germany was made. They got off to a flying start, beating Ghana 1-0 in their opening match and laying down a marker for their Group 2 adversaries South Africa, Cape Verde Islands, Congo DR and Uganda. The victory train began to come off the rails with two defeats to Cape Verde, and with a record of two wins and three losses, Burkina Faso were up against it at the half-way stage. Frenchman Bernard Simondi took over the coaching reins from Ivica Todorov and made the team harder to beat at home, even recording wins over South Africa and Congo DR, but in the end it was not quite enough, and the likes of Abdoulaye Cisse, Moumouni Dagano, and Wilfred Sanou went no further in the competition.

== History until independence in 1960 ==
Although football was already practiced at the turn of the century in the British colony of Gold Coast (now Ghana), this sport did not appear until the mid-1930s in the area of today's Burkina Faso. In 1932, the French colony of Upper Volta was divided among the neighboring colonies, so that the two main cities Ouagadougou and Bobo-Dioulasso then belonged to the colony of Ivory Coast. Bobo-Dioulasso, as a central commercial city meeting point of cultures and new ideas, was the starting point for the development of football in the country; The teams consisted mainly of French military personnel, missionaries, colonial officials and merchants, workers and employees from the neighboring colonies Gold Coast, Guinea, Senegal or French Sudan (now Mali). Especially the latter group was not only in Bobo-Dioulasso - especially those from French Sudan -, but throughout French-speaking Africa an important factor for the early development of football.

1935 was the first team Togo-Daho, which was later merged into Racing Club Bobo-Dioulasso, founded by the director of the French trading company Compagnie Française de la Côte d'Ivoire (CFCI), on special occasions until the war mobilization in 1939 against the team the French military base. A team of the Catholic Mission founded by Father Germain Nadal became Jeanne d'Arc Bobo-Dioulasso in 1946. Football was virtually unknown in Ouagadougou and the territories that were divided in the division of Upper Volta Niger and French Sudan until the 1940s, although occasionally in Ouagadougou games of members of the Association sportive voltaïque (ASV) and a French military team were discharged.

Only after the Second World War and the restoration of Upper Volta as a colony in 1947 clubs were founded in the capital, which had their origins in various cultural, ethnic, religious groups or other organizations of society. For example, newcomers from Dahome, now Benin, the club Modèle Sport (later AS Ouagadougou) and the Christian cleric Ambroise Ouédraogo founded the team Charles Lwanga, the predecessor of ASFA Yennenga Ouagadougou. This rapid development of football required the creation of organizational structures; The Frenchman Lucien Sangan founded a football district within the sporting administration of French West Africa. For the first time, official games took place on a sports field surrounded by seccos (a kind of straw walls) on the site of today's cinema Ciné Sanyon. Only officially registered club in Ouagadougou was at this time the team Modèle Sport, who had to travel to games after Bobo-Dioulasso, which in turn sent a team to a tournament in Abidjan (Ivory Coast) in 1949, in which the players had to play in part barefoot.

From 1950, football in Upper Volta changed from the elitist enjoyment of a few city dwellers to a popular sport practiced throughout the country. In many cities of the territory new associations were founded and in 1950 the football district based in Bobo-Dioulasso decided to join the Association of French West Africa, the Ligue d'AOF de Football, that of the Fédération Française de Football (FFF), the Federation of the Motherland France belonged. There were numerous clubs throughout the country. The infrastructure developed slowly, however, but it came to the opening of the municipal stadiums in Bobo-Dioulasso (1952) and Ouagadougou (1953 or 1958 depending on the source). While games were held mainly locally at the local level in the 1940s, there were more frequent inter-colonial encounters during the 1950s as part of friendlies or competitions organized by major West African trading companies. In addition, Upper Voltaic clubs participated in 1952 at the Coupe d'AOF, the Cup competition French West Africa, where they were, however, mostly inferior. It was not until 1958 that ASF Bobo-Dioulasso celebrated some success in this tournament. Among the big players of ASF at that time was Seydou Bamba. In the mid-1950s, Ouagadougou also founded its own district

== Beginning ==
The Federation Fédération Burkinabè de Football (FBF), founded in 1960, under the name Fédération voltaïque de football (FVF), has been a member of the World Federation FIFA and the African Federation CAF since 1964.

According to the statutes adopted in 2002, the FBF is subordinate to the Ministry of Sport and Leisure (Ministère des Sports et des Loisirs). The supreme body is the General Assembly (Assemblée Générale), which meets once a year and is composed of representatives of the leagues and associations, honorary members and the members of the Executive Bureau (Bureau Exécutif). The executive office is elected for a four-year term and consists of three vice-presidents and one secretary-general, in addition to the president.

Maxime Ouédraogo was the first president of the FVF after independence until his detention in 1963 in connection with his work as Minister of Labor. Under its successor, Adrien Tapsoba, the association adopted new statutes and became a member of FIFA and CAF, but after conflicts over the creation of new regional leagues, the federation was disbanded politically in 1965 and an interim leadership under Naon Charles Somé was instituted until the overthrow of the President Maurice Yaméogo was in office a year later. Adrien Tapsoba rejoined the association for a further 14 years before being replaced by Saye Zerbo's coup d'état, led by Michel Ilboudo, after a coup d'état by the National Football Team (CNCF). Another coup d'état in 1983, which brought Jean-Baptiste Ouédraogo to power, put a quick end to the committee. This turbulent phase in the history of the country culminated in 1983 in the revolution of Thomas Sankara, whose vision of a new society did not want to exclude football and its structures. But a planned tribunal populaire de la révolution, before which the former leaders of the association should answer, never took place. Under Sankara, the name of the country was changed in Burkina Faso, union presidents at the time of the revolution were Nurukyor Claude Somda and Pierre Guigma. Under the leadership of Félix Tiemtarboum, Souley Mohamed, and Boureima Badini, who voluntarily resigned in 1997, Blaise Compaoré, who put himself in power in 1987, became a unique association in the history of the association, now called Fédération Burkinabè de Football. Reason was the poor performance during qualifying for the 1998 World Cup. Also, his successor Honoré Traoré declared his resignation in 2002, as well Seydou Diakité in July 2007, who wanted to allow the association a fresh start, after the national selection in qualifying for Africa Cup 2008 had disappointed. In addition, there had been conflicts with the Ministry of Sport regarding the hosting of international games and budget overdrafts for international travel.

After a transitional phase led by Didier Ouédraogo Zambendé Théodore Sawadogo was elected on January 12, 2008 with 84 to 60 votes against Lt. Col. Yacouba Ouédraogo to the new Association President.

On April 20, 2010, the association announced that because of high debts, which were estimated by local media at 400 million CFA francs (about 610,000 euros), the accounts were blocked and the premises were confiscated.

Since March 10, 2012, Colonel Sita Sangaré is the successor of Sawadogo. He was elected with 95.9% of the votes - 203 out of 213 - to the Association President.

== National team ==
The first international match of the Upper Voltaic selection was played on April 13, 1960 in the Jeux de la Communauté in Madagascar and ended with a 5-4 victory against Gabon. In the squad were 15 players from six different clubs. In the following years the team took part in tournaments of the Jeux de l'Amitié in Abidjan (1961) and Dakar (1963). Upper Volta failed to qualify for the 1965 All-Africa Games and in 1968 took part for the first time in the qualifiers for the African Cup of Nations, but lost to Algeria and Mali. In the early years of the rule of President Sangoulé Lamizana (in office from 1966 to 1980) football was rated as subordinate.

In the 1970s, the rise of private entrepreneurship in the country led to an increased involvement in football, and the policy was set with the establishment of a Sports Department in 1971. When participating in the 1973 Pan African Games in Lagos (Nigeria) Obervolta lost under coach Bernard Bayala all three games, but was considered by observers as one of the great revelations of the tournament. During the engagement of the German Otto Pfister Obervolta was able to participate as a replacement for the Ivory Coast in 1978 for the first time at an African Cup and draw attention despite three defeats in the preliminary round internationally.

Only with the revolution of the Thomas Sankara 1983 began a massive promotion of the football sport, which serve the public health and which should help the country abroad to reputation. A new National Stadium (Stade du 4-Août) for the country now called Burkina Faso was opened in 1984. After Sankara's fall, the national team - trained in the meantime by the German Heinz-Peter Überjahn - the fruits of this continued even under the current since 1987 President Blaise Compaoré promotion yet. Only in 1996 was the qualification for the African Championship for the first time on their own. National coach was Idrissa Traoré (called saboteur) in 1993, which rejuvenated the team in a row and professionalized the environment. The poor performance at the tournament in South Africa led to the dismissal of Traoré. Under the Bulgarian Ivan Wutow and the Ghanaian Malik Jabir disappointed the team during qualifying for the 1998 World Cup, which was also in preparation for the African Cup in 1998 in their own country. Alarmed by the results, the association committed the French Philippe Troussier, who was given great support, to make the home tournament a sporting success.

The tournament was the biggest success of the team, as only in the semifinals the end against the eventual winner Egypt came. Supported by the frenetic audience, the team was able to outgrow it. This success could not be repeated in the episode; In 2000 (under the Belgian René Taelman), 2002 (under Jacques Yaméogo and Pihouri Webonga, who replaced the Argentine Oscar Fulloné shortly before the tournament began) and 2004 (under the French Jean-Paul Rabier) Burkina Faso retired in the preliminary round and even missed Participation in the tournaments 2006 and 2008.

The nickname of the team is Les Étalons (French "the stallions"), in memory of the stallion of the mythical Mossi princess Yennenga.

Only a few times did the team compete against non-African opponents; against Qatar and South Korea, three times against Bahrain and twice against Oman. Some friendly matches against other African teams took place on European soil. The Étalons locaux played in 2015 in Almaty against Kazakhstan.

After already missed the qualification for the African Cup 2006, the team also failed in qualifying for the 2008 tournament in Ghana. The re-contracted coach Idrissa Traoré was dismissed in April 2007, as in addition to the poor sporting results should have problems between him, the team and the association leadership, as the association announced at a press conference on June 19, 2007. The association management decided to appoint the Frenchman Didier Notheaux for the second time after 1998 as national coach. Nevertheless, the remaining games in the qualification could not be won. After Notheaux was dismissed in October 2007, the association presented in March the Portuguese Paulo Duarte as successor. After eight wins in eleven games qualifying for the 2010 Africa Cup and the 2010 World Cup, Burkina Faso was a participant in the 2010 tournament in Angola, where, as in 2012 in Gabon and Equatorial Guinea, the end was after the preliminary round. As a result, Duarte was dismissed by the association. His successor was the Belgian Paul Put, who succeeded in the 2013 AM in South Africa, the finals. After the weak performance at the 2015 tournament he was dismissed and replaced by the German Gernot Rohr. Rohr resigned in December of the same year due to the political situation, not for sporting reasons. Paulo Duarte then became National Coach Burkina Faso for the second time.

The national team is ranked 71st in the current FIFA World Ranking (August 2015) and is thus ranked 16th among the African teams.

The official outfitter of the national team since 2015 is the sporting goods manufacturer Kappa; Puma had been outfitter from 2010, Airness from 2006. The training ground is the Center omnisport des Étalons (COMET) in the district of Ouaga 2000.

The following players were in the squad for the 2017 FIFA World Cup against Botswana on 5 September 2015: Germain Sanou, Abdoulaye Soulama, Mohamed Koffi, Bakary Koné, Steeve Yago, Paul Koulibaly, Narcisse Bambara, Jonathan Zongo, Préjuce Nakoulma and Charles Kaboré. Djakaridja Koné, Bertrand Traoré, Adama Guira, Jonathan Pitroipa, Aristide Bancé, Issiaka Ouédraogo, Alain Traore, Baba Zongo, Issoufou Dayo, Pierre Daila, Patrick Malo, Abdoul Aziz Kaboré, Aly Rabo

The Étalons locaux have been created as part of the 2009 African Nations Championship, a tournament for national teams that only consist of players active in the respective national leagues. Her trainer is Idrissa Traoré since 2015.

== Club competitions ==
In contrast to the national team, whose games are well attended and are pursued with passion, the national club competitions suffer from loss of importance and lack of interest of the Burkinabe public, who have their reasons mainly in the poorly assessed quality of the club teams. 20 or 30 years ago, the great duels - such as the arch rivals Étoile Filante Ouagadougou and ASFA - Yennenga Ouagadougou - events that occupied the whole country for weeks, they are hardly noticed today and Burkinabe teams succeed no successes in the African Cup more. Observers see inadequate training of youth players and lack of identification with the clubs as the cause of the decline in quality of the championship.

Since the Ouagadougous clubs have their roots in individual districts, the Hauptstadtderbys are still perceived today as Stadtteilduelle. Thus, Étoile Filante has its roots in the northeast of the city (Dapoya, Paspanga, Koulouba), ASFA-Yennenga in the southwest (Bilbalogho, Gounghin, Cissin) and US Ouagadougou comes from Larle. Regarding the sporting rivalries, the founder of EFO, Oumar Koanda, says: "If ASFA invites you to have fun, you must appear with a machete!" ("Si l'ASFA t'invite à s'amuser, il faut all avec une machette! »).

The club competitions are organized by the federation-affiliated Ligue Nationale de Football (LNF).

=== Burkinabe championship ===
First Obervoltaischer champion 1961 ASF Bobo-Dioulasso, who could repeat this success in the following two years. As a result, teams from Ouagadougou and Bobo-Dioulasso made the championship among themselves. In 1974, by order of the Minister Félix Tiemtarboum, a championship was created on the basis of regional elections, which were to take the place of club teams for the national title. The aim was to join forces to become more successful in continental club competitions. This decision led to polemics and shared public opinion. With seven titles in a row, the Silures Bobo Dioulasso were more successful than the rival selection Kadiogo Club Ouagadougou. In some successes, this system also led to frustration among the leaders of each club and had no future. In 1981 and 1982, there were no games due to political turbulence. The dominant clubs of the following years were first Étoile Filante Ouagadougou and later ASFA Yennenga Ouagadougou. Record champion is Étoile Filante with twelve titles.

Master of the Year 2007 was CF Ouagadougou. Les Communaux won in the second Erstligajahr the first championship title. In 2008, after seven years again Étoile Filante could obtain the title, but had to hand it in 2009 to ASFA-Yennenga, who succeeded in 2010, 2011 and 2012, the title defense. Current champion 2015 is Racing Club Bobo-Dioulasso.

=== Problem ===
The game operation is deficient and is subsidized by the Ministry of Sport, the cost of travel to games are taken, for example. Since Burkina Faso's sponsorship of tobacco companies was banned, the financial situation has worsened. The Manufacture burkinabè de cigarettes (MABUCIG) with the cigarette brand Excellence paid the association as a sponsor from 1999 annually 200 million CFA francs (about 300,000 euros). While the players of Étoile Filante earn between 75,000 and 250,000 CFA francs (approximately between 115 and 380 euros), others get only 30,000 CFA francs (about 46 euros) and still others are pure amateurs. Since the clubs have no sponsors, the club officials pay the costs incurred from their own pocket. On April 25, 2010, the game operation was interrupted after a few days before the association had reported its insolvency and debts, which were estimated by local media with about 610,000 euros. After the state agreed to finance the game operation, the association announced the continuation of the championship.

Racing Club Bobo-Dioulasso's Cup quarter-final match against RC Kadiogo Ouagadougou on July 18, 2007, revealed the age-related issues of Burkinabe players. Since a player from RCK had given his age wrong, the athletic loser RCB won the game at the Green Table. But according to Amado Traoré (president of RC Kadiogo), "99.99% of the players claim a fake age." An aggravating factor is that in Burkina Faso the date of birth is often unknown, as the organized reporting system does not cover all residents and birth dates have traditionally had little significance for the population.

Violent incidents occurred at the end of the 2006/07 season, when US Yatenga Ouahigouya's play against US Ouagadougou supporters of the home team provoked a disruption of the game by throwing objects. Security forces used tear gas to deal with the situation. Several people were injured, one of them seriously. Santos FC Ouagadougou's fans attacked the referee on the final day of the match. After a 15-minute break during which the referee received medical treatment, the game continued. With the 1: 2 defeat, the descent of Santos was sealed.

On the final day of the 2001/02 season, the result of the match between Olympic Nahouri of Po and Santos FC had been denied in favor of Pôs. The association evaluated the game for both clubs as a defeat and the secretaries-general of the participating clubs were closed for one year. Pô was also involved in affairs involving fake player passes.

To compensate for the gap between clubs from the two dominant cities and the rest of the country (2005/06 came from 14 first division clubs eight from Ouagadougou and four from Bobo-Dioulasso), the association decided to increase the number of clubs from Ouagadougou to five and the To limit clubs from Bobo-Dioulasso to three; Since 2007, in addition to the regular relegated at the bottom of the table even the worst placed club from Ouagadougou descend. The first club affected by this new arrangement was Santos FC in tenth place in the 2006/07 season, the following year AS-SONABEL Ouagadougou fell victim to the scheme. The ruling has been widely criticized, has led to controversy over the rise and participation in relegation matches of second-tier followers, but should be maintained until at least 2011 and then reviewed. With the reforms for the season 2011/12 this regulation was repealed. Unclear playing rights of players of the Deuxième Division and thus ratings of individual games led to controversy, which were resolved by a compromise; All six participants in the promotion round automatically climbed into the first league.

== League system ==
| Level | League(s)/Division(s) |
| 1 | Première Division; 16 clubs |
| 2 | Deuxième Division; 20 clubs |
| 3 | Troisième Division; 64 clubs |

=== Regional leagues ===
The bases are the leagues of the eleven regional associations Center, Center-Est, Center-Ouest, Center-North, North, Est, Nazinon, Ouest, Boucle du Mouhoun, Sud-Ouest and Sahel. The regional leagues are in turn divided into districts. In total there were 118 football clubs in 2008, of which 31 were in the administrative region of Center and 27 in Sud-Ouest.

=== Burkinabe cup competitions ===
There is a cup competition (Coupe du Faso) instead, in which also unterklassige and not affiliated teams participate. Each year, 32 qualified teams compete for the title. First cup winner 1961 Racing Club Bobo-Dioulasso. After the victory in 2015 USFA Ouagadougou is reigning champions.

Champions and cup winners wear a Supercup every year (Super Coupe, Coupe de l'AJSB).

The coupe of the leader was held from 1989 to 2002 before each season; The first four teams of the championship and the semi-finalists of the cup competition of the previous season were eligible. This competition, sponsored by the cigarette brand Excellence, had to be discontinued when Burkina Faso banned the sponsorship of sporting events by tobacco companies.

=== International club competitions ===
Only rarely do Burkinabe teams succeed in the Africa Cup. Outstanding is the entry of Kadiogo Club Ouagadougou in the semi-finals of the African Cup Winners' Cup 1978, when Kadiogo in the quarterfinals Zamalek Cairo from Egypt could eliminate and failed in the semifinals at the eventual tournament winner Horoya AC (Conakry, Guinea). At that time Kadiogo was trained by Otto Pfister. In the same year, Master Silures Bobo-Dioulasso made it to the quarter-finals of the African Cup of Champions, defeated there the Guinean representative Hafia FC (Conakry). According to sports journalists and inferior coaches, the team would have earned the finals this year.

== Youth football ==
In the 1960s, the games of student teams enjoyed great interest. The teams of the two high schools Lycée Philippe Zinda Kaboré (Ouagadougou) and Lycée Ouezzin Coulibaly (Bobo-Dioulasso) delivered "legendary" duels and were for the clubs source of junior players.

The Union of Sports Schools and Universities of Burkina Faso (USSU-BF) organizes annual championships for pupils and students in various age groups.

The first success of a Burkinabe national youth team succeeded when the U-17 juniors (Étalons cadets) qualified for the 1999 World Cup in New Zealand. The team did not get past the group stage. At the next tournament in 2001 in Trinidad and Tobago, however, succeeded a great success when Argentina could be defeated in the match for the 3rd place. Outstanding players were Wilfried Sanou and Madi Panandétiguiri. The U-20 national team (Étalons juniors) could qualify two years later for the 2003 World Cup in the United Arab Emirates and move there in the second round. The greatest success of a youth selection Burkina Faso succeeded under coach Rui Vieira with the title at the U-17 Africa Cup 2011 in Rwanda.

The General Assembly of the National Football Association forms a commission dedicated to youth football. There are four age groups in the youth teams: pupilles (0-13), minimes (13-15), cadets (15-17) and juniors (17-20).

Coach of the U-20 team was until 2010, the German Rainer Willfeld.

Since the association had failed to register the actually athletically qualified Olympic team (U 23) in time for the African Games 2015, it was disqualified by the African Federation. The African Games count as a qualifier for the 2016 Summer Olympics.

From 2003, national championships were held in youth football.

Maxime Ouédraogo was the first president of the FVF after independence until his detention in 1963 in connection with his work as Minister of Labor. Under its successor, Adrien Tapsoba, the association adopted new statutes and became a member of FIFA and CAF, but after conflicts over the creation of new regional leagues, the federation was disbanded politically in 1965 and an interim leadership under Naon Charles Somé was instituted until the overthrow of the President Maurice Yaméogo was in office a year later. Adrien Tapsoba rejoined the association for a further 14 years before being replaced by Saye Zerbo's coup d'état, led by Michel Ilboudo, after a coup d'état by the National Football Team (CNCF). Another coup d'état in 1983, which brought Jean-Baptiste Ouédraogo to power, put a quick end to the committee. This turbulent phase in the history of the country culminated in 1983 in the revolution of Thomas Sankara, whose vision of a new society did not want to exclude football and its structures. But a planned tribunal populaire de la révolution, before which the former leaders of the association should answer, never took place. Under Sankara, the name of the country was changed in Burkina Faso, union presidents at the time of the revolution were Nurukyor Claude Somda and Pierre Guigma. Under the leadership of Félix Tiemtarboum, Souley Mohamed, and Boureima Badini, who voluntarily resigned in 1997, Blaise Compaoré, who put himself in power in 1987, became a unique association in the history of the association, now called Fédération Burkinabè de Football. Reason was the poor performance during qualifying for the 1998 World Cup. Also, his successor Honoré Traoré declared his resignation in 2002, as well Seydou Diakité in July 2007, who wanted to allow the association a fresh start, after the national selection in qualifying for Africa Cup 2008 had disappointed. In addition, there had been conflicts with the Ministry of Sport regarding the hosting of international games and budget overdrafts for international travel.

On April 20, 2010, the association announced that because of high debts, which were estimated by local media at 400 million CFA francs (about 610,000 euros), the accounts were blocked and the premises were confiscated.

Since March 10, 2012, Colonel Sita Sangaré is the successor of Sawadogo. He was elected with 95.9% of the votes - 203 out of 213 - to the Association President.

== Women's football ==
In 2003, a national women's championship was held for the first time. Of the ten clubs could Princesses FC Kadiogo from Ouagadougou prevail and win the title. Due to financial problems, the game operation had to be suspended at the end of 2006. The association plans to continue to support women's football.

The first edition of the national cup competition Coupe du Faso won Gazelles FC of Ouagadougou on December 11, 2011, 2–0 against Princesses Kadiogo FC.

A national team for women exists since 2007. She completed her first competitive games in 2014, on the occasion of qualifying for the African Cup 2014. Burkina Faso defeated Ghana twice with 0–3.

The U-20 team participates in the qualification for the 2016 World Cup.

== Other aspects ==
The first stadiums of Ouagadougou (Stade Dr Issoufou Joseph Conombo, formerly Stade Municipal de Ouagadougou) and Bobo-Dioulasso (Stade Wobi) were built in the 1950s. The National Stadium Stade du 4-Août was opened in 1984 and today serves as the home venue of the national team. For the African Championship in 1998, the Stade Omnisports de Bobo-Dioulasso was built. There are a lot of smaller stadiums.

Television has been reporting on national football since its earliest days; Sports Volta on the state broadcaster Volta-vision was the first broadcast. Today, RTB's 30-minute sports magazine reports on football, among other things. After independence, the football magazine Volta Foot appeared, today there are the sports magazines Sidwaya Sport, Sport 2000 and Sport Plus. For the 2009/10 season, the RTB began with the transfer of Erstligaspielen, which are held in Ouagadougou. This is done in collaboration with the French football marketing company IFAP Sports.

As part of FIFA's Goal Program, five new projects (2001, 2006, 2009, 2010 and 2013) included the construction of a new association building, a training center for the various national teams and a seat for the regional leagues. In addition, the Stade Wobi was equipped in Bobo-Dioulasso with an artificial turf field and floodlights. With support from FIFA, the Stade Municipal de Ouagadougou was also equipped with artificial turf.

After disagreements concerning the national team's fan club, the National Union of Supporters of the Étalon (UNSE), Minister of Sport Jean-Pierre Palm founded the National Supporters' Association of the Étalons (CNES) in 2006. It is to support the national teams of all sports in the country. Major entrepreneurs such as Oumarou Kanazoé (†), Georges Fadoul and Joseph Hage have been involved and engaged in the Union.

== Football stadiums in Burkina Faso ==
| # | Stadium | Capacity | City | Tenants | Image |
|---|---|---|---|---|---|
| 1 | Stade du 4 Août | 29,800 | Ouagadougou | Burkina Faso national football team, Étoile Filante de Ouagadougou | |
| 2 | Stade Municipal | 25,000 | Ouagadougou | | |
| 3 | Stade Wobi Bobo-Dioulasso | 10,000 | Bobo-Dioulasso | US FRAN | |

== Attendances ==
The average attendance per top-flight football league season and the club with the highest average attendance:

| Season | League average | Best club | Best club average |
|---|---|---|---|
| 2022-23 | 642 | Étoile Filante de Ouagadougou | 1,842 |

Source: League page on Wikipedia

== See also ==
- Lists of stadiums

== Literature ==
- Bassirou Sanogo: La Longue Marche du football burkinabè. Survol historique 1935–1998. Sidwaya, Ouagadougou 1998
