= Kouamé Botué =

Burkinabé footballer

Personal information
- Full name: Jean Fiacre Kouamé Botué
- Date of birth: 10 September 2002 (age 24)
- Place of birth: Abidjan, Ivory Coast
- Height: 1.84 m (6 ft 0 in)
- Position: Forward

Team information
- Current team: Inter Turku
- Number: 11

Youth career
- 2017–2018: Rail Club du Kadiogo
- 2018–2021: USFA

Senior career*
Years	Team	Apps	(Gls)
2018–2021	USFA	18	(6)
2021–2024	Ajaccio	27	(1)
2021–2024	Ajaccio B	8	(3)
2024–	Inter Turku	81	(12)

International career^{‡}
2019–2021	Burkina Faso U20	9	(3)
2021–	Burkina Faso	3	(0)
- * Club domestic league appearances and goals as of 12 November 2026 ‡ National team caps and goals as of 22:03, 7 September 2021 (UTC)

Jean Fiacre Kouamé Botué (born 10 September 2002) is a professional footballer who plays as a forward for Veikkausliiga club Inter Turku. Born in the Ivory Coast, he plays for the Burkina Faso national team.

== Club career ==
Botué started football in the youth sector of Rail Club du Kadiogo in Burkina Faso in 2017. He joined fellow Burkinabé Premier League club US des Forces Armées (USFA) in 2018 and made his senior debut in the league.

Botué signed with French Ligue 2 side Ajaccio on 16 February 2021 from USFA in Burkina Faso. Botué made his debut with Ajaccio in a 1–1 Ligue 2 win over Valenciennes on 3 April 2021.

On 27 February 2024, Inter Turku in Finnish Veikkausliiga announced the signing of Botue. On 20 September, his deal was extended until the end of 2026.

== International career ==
Botué was born in the Ivory Coast and raised in Burkina Faso, and is of Burkinabé descent through his mother. Botué represented the Burkina Faso U20s at the 2019 and 2021 Africa U-20 Cup of Nations. He debuted with the senior Burkina Faso national team in a 0–0 2022 FIFA World Cup qualification tie with Algeria on 7 September 2021.

== Career statistics ==
As of 2 August 2026

Appearances and goals by club, season and competition
Club	Season	League			National cup (Note: Includes Coupe de France and Finnish Cup)		League cup (Note: Includes Finnish League Cup)		Continental		Total	
Club	Season	Division	Apps	Goals	Apps	Goals	Apps	Goals	Apps	Goals	Apps	Goals
USFA	2018–19	Burkinabé Premier League	1	1	0	0	—		—		1	1
USFA	2019-20	Burkinabé Premier League	8	1	0	0	—		—		8	1
USFA	2020–21	Burkinabé Premier League	9	4	0	0	—		—		9	4
USFA	Total		18	6	0	0	0	0	0	0	18	6
Ajaccio	2020–21	Ligue 2	7	0	0	0	—		—		7	0
Ajaccio	2021–22	Ligue 2	12	1	0	0	—		—		12	1
Ajaccio	2022–23	Ligue 1	8	0	1	0	—		—		9	0
Ajaccio	2023–24	Ligue 2	0	0	0	0	—		—		0	0
Ajaccio	Total		27	1	1	0	0	0	0	0	28	1
Ajaccio B	2021–22	National 3	6	2	—		—		—		6	2
Ajaccio B	2022–23	National 3	2	1	—		—		—		2	1
Ajaccio B	Total		8	3	0	0	0	0	0	0	8	3
Inter Turku	2024	Veikkausliiga	26	7	5	3	4	2	—		35	12
Inter Turku	2025	Veikkausliiga	29	4	2	2	5	0	–		36	6
Inter Turku	2026	Veikkausliiga	17	0	4	2	7	2	4 (Note: Appearances in UEFA Conference League)	0	32	4
Inter Turku	Total		72	11	11	7	16	4	4	0	103	22
Career total			125	21	12	7	16	4	4	0	157	32

== Honours ==
Ajaccio

- Ligue 2 runner-up: 2021–22

Inter Turku

- Finnish Cup runner-up: 2024
- Finnish League Cup: 2024, 2025
