= Mohamed Kaboré =

Burkinabé footballer

Personal information
- Full name: Mohamed Kaboré
- Date of birth: December 31, 1980 (age 45)
- Place of birth: Ouagadougou, Upper Volta
- Height: 1.90 m (6 ft 3 in)
- Position: Goalkeeper

Team information
- Current team: ASFA Yennenga
- Number: 1

Youth career
- 1993–1996: Racing Club de Bobo

Senior career*
| Years | Team | Apps | (Gls) |
| 1997–1999 | Racing Club de Bobo | 44 | (0) |
| 1999–2002 | ASFA Yennega | 25 | (0) |
| 2002–2004 | Stade Malien | 16 | (0) |
| 2004–2006 | Etoile Filante Ouagadougou | | |
| 2006–2007 | ASEC Mimosas | 20 | (0) |
| 2008–2013 | Etoile Filante Ouagadougou | | |
| 2013– | ASFA Yennenga | | |

International career^{‡}
| 2002– | Burkina Faso | 66 | (0) |
- * Club domestic league appearances and goals ‡ National team caps and goals as of January 28, 2014

Mohamed Kaboré (born December 31, 1980, in Ouagadougou, Burkina Faso) is a Burkinabé football goalkeeper. He currently plays for ASFA Yennenga.

== International ==
Kaboré was part of the Burkinabé 2004 African Nations Cup team, which finished bottom of its group in the first round of competition, thus failing to secure qualification for the quarter-finals.

== Clubs ==
- 1997–1999 : Racing Club de Bobo
- 1999–2002 : ASFA Yennega
- 2002–2004 : Stade Malien
- 2004–2006 : Etoile Filante Ouagadougou
- 2006–2007 : ASEC Mimosas
- 2008–2013 : Etoile Filante Ouagadougou
- 2013– : ASFA Yennega
