= Djibril Ouattara =

Burkinabé footballer

Personal information
- Full name: Cheick Djibril Ouattara
- Date of birth: 19 September 1999 (age 27)
- Place of birth: Bobo-Dioulasso, Burkina Faso
- Height: 1.84 m (6 ft 0 in)
- Position: Striker

Team information
- Current team: APR FC RWANDA
- Number: 10

Senior career*
Years	Team	Apps	(Gls)
2016–2017	Vitesse FC		
2017–2018	ASF Bobo Dioulasso		
2018–2024	RS Berkane	62	(6)
2021–2022	→ OC Safi (loan)	23	(7)
2024–2025	JS Kabylie	11	(1)

International career^{‡}
2019	Burkina Faso U20		
2018–	Burkina Faso	15	(2)
Medal record
Men's football
Representing Burkina Faso
African Games
Gold medal – first place	2019 Rabat	Team
- * Club domestic league appearances and goals as of 21:40, 6 January 2025 (UTC) ‡ National team caps and goals as of 22:10, 23 January 2024 (UTC)

Cheick Djibril Ouattara (born 19 September 1999) is a Burkinabé professional footballer who plays as a striker for the Burkina Faso national team.

== Club career ==
After one season in the third division with Vitesse FC, Ouattara was signed by Burkinabé Premier League club ASF Bobo Dioulasso in 2017. In 2018, they won the league title and he led all scorers with 15 goals.

In July 2024, Ouattara signed a three-year contract with JS Kabylie. In January 2025, he was released by the club.

== International career ==
Ouattara won a gold medal with the Burkina Faso national under-20 team at the 2019 African Games, where he was the top goalscorer.

== Honours ==
ASF Bobo Dioulasso

- Burkinabé Premier League: 2017–18
- Burkinabé Cup runner-up: 2018
- Burkinabé Super Cup runner-up: 2018

RS Berkane

- Moroccan Throne Cup: 2020–21, 2021–22
- CAF Confederation Cup: 2019–20
- CAF Super Cup: 2022
- CAF Confederation Cup runner-up: 2018–19, 2023–24
- CAF Super Cup runner-up: 2021 (May)

Burkina Faso U20

- African Games: 2019

Individual

- Burkinabé Premier League top scorer: 2017–18
- African Games top scorer: 2019
