= Oumarou Nébié =

Burkina Faso footballer

Personal information
- Date of birth: 25 September 1990 (age 36)
- Place of birth: Bobo-Dioulasso, Burkina Faso
- Position: Midfielder

Team information
- Current team: ASFA Yennenga
- Number: 12

Senior career*
Years	Team	Apps	(Gls)
2005–2007	RC Bobo		
2007–2010	Étoile Filante		
2010–	ASFA Yennenga		

International career
2013–	Burkina Faso	6	(0)
- * Club domestic league appearances and goals

Oumarou Nébié is a Burkina Faso professional footballer who plays as a midfielder for ASFA Yennenga and the Burkina Faso national football team.

== International career ==
In January 2014, coach Brama Traore, invited him to be a part of the Burkina Faso squad for the 2014 African Nations Championship. The team was eliminated in the group stages after losing to Uganda and Zimbabwe and then drawing with Morocco.
