= Moussa Ouwo =

Nigerien footballer

Personal information
- Date of birth: May 29, 1976 (age 50)
- Place of birth: Niger
- Position: Defender

Team information
- Current team: AS Sonabel

Senior career*
Years	Team	Apps	(Gls)
2002–2007	JS du Ténéré		
2007–20xx	AS Sonabel		

International career
2002–20xx	Niger		
- * Club domestic league appearances and goals

Moussa Ouwo (born May 29, 1976 in Niger) is a Nigerien football defender. He has represented the Niger national football team.
