= Patrick Malo =

Burkinabé footballer

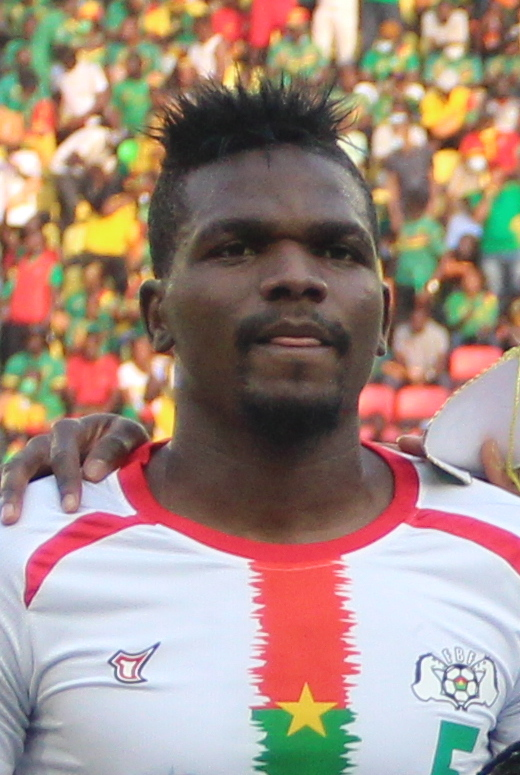
- Malo in 2022

Personal information
- Full name: Patrick Bihetoué Arnaud Malo
- Date of birth: 18 February 1992 (age 34)
- Place of birth: Ouagadougou, Burkina Faso
- Height: 1.80 m (5 ft 11 in)
- Position: Left-back

Team information
- Current team: Qadsia SC

Senior career*
Years	Team	Apps	(Gls)
2011–2013	USFA	28	(7)
2013–2015	SOA	63	(10)
2015–2016	JS Kabylie	23	(1)
2016–2017	Smouha	29	(2)
2017–2018	Wadi Degla	16	(2)
2018–2019	ASEC Mimosas		
2020–2022	Hassania Agadir		
2022–	Qadsia SC		

International career^{‡}
2015–	Burkina Faso	19	(0)
Medal record
Representing Burkina Faso
Africa Cup of Nations
Third place	2017 Gabon
- * Club domestic league appearances and goals as of 18:47, 7 July 2022 (UTC) ‡ National team caps and goals as of 18:47, 13 June 2021 (UTC)

Patrick Bihetoué Arnaud Malo (born 18 February 1992) is a Burkinabé professional footballer who plays as a left-back for Kuwaiti club Qadsia SC and the Burkina Faso national team.

== Career ==
Born in Ouagadougou, Malo has played for USFA, SOA, JS Kabylie, Smouha, Wadi Degla, ASEC Mimosas and Hassania Agadir.

Malo made his international debut for the Burkina Faso national team in 2015, and was named in the squad for the 2017 Africa Cup of Nations.

== Personal life ==
Malo's father, Kamou, was a former manager of Burkina Faso.
