= Stade Banfora =

Stadium in Burkina Faso

Coordinates: 10°39′7″N 4°44′45″W

- Location: Banfora, Burkina Faso
- Capacity: 6,000

Tenants
- Union Sportive de la Comoé

Stade Banfora is a multi-use stadium in Banfora, Burkina Faso. It is currently used mostly for football matches and is the home stadium of Union Sportive de la Comoé. The stadium holds 6,000 people.
