= Cheick Oumar Koné =

Malian football manager

Cheick Oumar Koné (born c. 1956) is a Malian football coach.

== Early life ==
Cheick Oumar Koné was born in Mali around 1956.

== Career ==
Koné first played for Stade Malien de Sikasso, from January 1974 through to December 1984. He then played for or coached AS Nianan from 1984 to 2000, apart from 1987/88, when he played for AS Real Bamako.

From January 2001 to June 2003 he coached top division club USFAS Bamako, which is owned by the Malian Army.

He coached the Mali Olympic team at the 2004 Olympics and remained coach until 2013, and then again in 2016.

He became manager of ASFA Yennega in the Burkina Faso league in the 2013/14 season, where he remained until 2020/21.

In 2015, he coached the Malian team in the Africa U-23 Cup of Nations.
