= JC de Bobo Dioulasso =

JC Bobo-Dioulasso
- Full name: JC Bobo-Dioulasso
- Founded: 1 June 1953
- Ground: Stade de Bobo Dioulasso; Bobo-Dioulasso, Burkina Faso
- Capacity: 2,000
- League: Burkinabé Premier League

JC Bobo-Dioulasso is a Burkinabé football club that competes in the Burkinabé Premier League.

The club was founded on 1 June 1953.

== Stadium ==
Currently the team plays at the 2000 capacity Stade de Bobo Dioulasso.
