= Banou Diawara =

Burkinabé footballer

Personal information
- Full name: Banou Diawara
- Date of birth: 13 February 1992 (age 34)
- Place of birth: Bobo-Dioulasso, Burkina Faso
- Height: 1.85 m (6 ft 1 in)
- Position: Forward

Team information
- Current team: Sebeta City

Senior career*
Years	Team	Apps	(Gls)
2013–2015	Bobo Dioulasso	?	(27)
2015–2016	JS Kabylie	25	(11)
2016–2017	Smouha	30	(4)
2018	AS FAR	6	(2)
2018–2019	Tubize	13	(0)
2019–	Sebeta City		

International career^{‡}
2015–	Burkina Faso	17	(5)
Medal record
Representing Burkina Faso
Africa Cup of Nations
Third place	2017 Gabon
- * Club domestic league appearances and goals as of 16:41, 19 March 2020 (UTC) ‡ National team caps and goals as of 13 October 2018

Banou Diawara (born 13 February 1992) is a Burkinabé footballer who plays for Ethiopian club Sebeta City. He plays primarily as a forward.

== Club career ==
In January 2018, Diawara joined AS FAR, signing a two-year contract with the club.

== International career ==
=== International goals ===
Scores and results list Burkina Faso's goal tally first.

No	Date	Venue	Opponent	Score	Result	Competition
1.	4 September 2016	Stade du 4 Août, Ouagadougou, Burkina Faso	Botswana	2–1	2–1	2017 Africa Cup of Nations qualification
2.	8 October 2016	Stade du 4 Août, Ouagadougou, Burkina Faso	South Africa	1–1	1–1	2018 FIFA World Cup qualification
3.	12 November 2016	Estádio Nacional de Cabo Verde, Praia, Cape Verde	Cape Verde	1–0	2–0	2018 FIFA World Cup qualification
4.	14 November 2017	Stade du 4 Août, Ouagadougou, Burkina Faso	Cape Verde	4–0	4–0	2018 FIFA World Cup qualification
5.	13 October 2018	Stade du 4 Août, Ouagadougou, Burkina Faso	Botswana	2–0	3–0	2019 Africa Cup of Nations qualification

== Honours ==
Bobo Dioulasso

- Burkinabé Premier League: 2014–15

Individual

- Burkinabé Premier League top scorer: 2013–14, 2014–15
