= Kassoum Ouédraogo =

Burkinabé footballer

Personal information
- Date of birth: 12 April 1966 (age 60)
- Place of birth: Upper Volta
- Height: 1.74 m (5 ft 9 in)
- Position: Forward

Senior career*
Years	Team	Apps	(Gls)
1985–1988	Étoile Filante de Ouagadougou		
- Espérance Sportive de Tunis
- Eendracht Aalst
1991–1993	Darmstadt 98	24	(3)
1993–1995	FC Hessen Kassel	50	(19)
1995–1996	FSV Frankfurt	30	(10)
1996–1998	VfL Osnabrück	24	(7)
1998–1999	Al Wasl FC		

International career
1988–1999	Burkina Faso	20	(5)
- * Club domestic league appearances and goals

Kassoum Ouédraogo (born 12 April 1966), sometimes spelled as Kassoum Quedraogo, is a Burkinabé former professional footballer who played as a forward. He played internationally for the Burkina Faso national team and at the club level with German clubs Darmstadt 98, FC Hessen Kassel, VfL Osnabrück, FSV Frankfurt and United Arab Emirates club Al Wasl FC.

== Career ==
Ouédraogo first moved abroad to join Tunisian club Espérance Sportive de Tunis from Étoile Filante de Ouagadougou.

He continued his career in Europe where, after playing for Belgian side Eendracht Aalst, he signed with 2. Bundesliga club Darmstadt 98. Having become a fan favourite at FC Hessen Kassel, he joined another 2. Bundesliga club in FSV Frankfurt. His spell at FSV Frankfurt was not successful, and Ouédraogo signed for VfL Osnabrück. His started well at Osnabrück scoring 11 goals in pre-season and five goals in his first two league appearances. He scored just twice in the rest of the season and was demoted to the club's second team in the second half of the season. He ended his career after a season in the United Arab Emirates with Al Wasl FC.

== Career statistics ==
Scores and results list Burkina Faso's goal tally first, score column indicates score after each Ouédraogo goal.

List of international goals scored by Kassoum Ouédraogo
No.	Date	Venue	Opponent	Score	Result	Competition
1	16 June 1996	Stade du 4 Août, Ouagadougou, Burkina Faso	Mauritania	1–0	2–0	1998 FIFA World Cup qualification
2	27 December 1997	Stade du 4 Août, Ouagadougou, Burkina Faso	Ivory Coast	1–0	2–0	Friendly
3	11 February 1998	Stade du 4 Août, Ouagadougou, Burkina Faso	Algeria	1–0	2–1	1998 Africa Cup of Nations
4	21 February 1998	Stade du 4 Août, Ouagadougou, Burkina Faso	Tunisia	1–0	1–1 (8–7 p)	1998 Africa Cup of Nations
5	6 June 1999	Stade du 4 Août, Ouagadougou, Burkina Faso	Senegal	1–1	2–2	2000 African Cup of Nations qualification
