= Sourou Sport de Tougan =

Sourou Sport
- Full name: SOUROU SPORT DE TOUGAN
- Founded: 1954
- Ground: Stade Sangoulé-Lamizana; Tougan
- Capacity: 2,000
- League: Burkinabé Second Division

Sourou Sport is a Burkinabé football club based in Tougan, Burkina Faso. The team was founded in 1954 and play in the Burkinabé Second Division.

== Stadium ==
Currently the team plays at the 2000 capacity Stade Sangoulé-Lamizana.

== League participations ==
- Burkinabé Premier League: 2009–2013
- Burkinabé Second Division: 2013–
