= Burkinabé SuperCup =

- Founded: 1993
- Region: Burkina Faso
- Current champions: AS SONABEL (2nd title)
- Most championships: Étoile Filante de Ouagadougou (7 titles)
- 2021 Burkinabé SuperCup

The Burkinabé SuperCup, known in English as the Burkina Faso Super Cup, is a match competition in Burkinabé football, played between the Burkinabé Premier League champions and the Coupe du Faso winners.

The cup is known as the Coupe de l'Association Sportive des Journalistes du Burkina.

== Winners ==
=== Past finals ===
Year	Winner	Score	Runner-up
1993	ASF Bobo Dioulasso	1–0	Étoile Filante de Ouagadougou
1994	Étoile Filante de Ouagadougou		
1995	RC Bobo Dioulasso		
1996	Étoile Filante de Ouagadougou		
1997	ASF Bobo Dioulasso		
1998	US des Forces Armées	2–0	Étoile Filante de Ouagadougou
1999	Étoile Filante de Ouagadougou	2–1	ASFA Yennenga
2000	US des Forces Armées	3–1	Étoile Filante de Ouagadougou
2001	ASF Bobo Dioulasso	2–0	Étoile Filante de Ouagadougou
2002	ASFA Yennenga	1–0	US des Forces Armées
2003	Étoile Filante de Ouagadougou	1–1 (4–3 pen.)	ASFA Yennenga
2004	ASF Bobo Dioulasso	2–0	ASFA Yennenga
2005	US Ouagadougou	2–1	Rail Club du Kadiogo
2006	Étoile Filante de Ouagadougou	2–1	ASFA Yennenga
2007	Commune FC	1–1 (6–5 pen.)	RC Bobo Dioulasso
2008	US Ouagadougou	2–0	Étoile Filante de Ouagadougou
2009	ASFA Yennenga	3–0	US des Forces Armées
2010	US des Forces Armées	2–0	ASFA Yennenga
2011	Étoile Filante de Ouagadougou	1–1 (8–7 pen.)	ASFA Yennenga
2012	Rail Club du Kadiogo	1–0	ASFA Yennenga
2013	ASFA Yennenga	1–1 (5–4 pen.)	AS SONABEL
2014	RC Bobo Dioulasso	2–0	Étoile Filante de Ouagadougou
2015	Not held		
2016	Rail Club du Kadiogo	1–0	AS SONABEL
2017	Étoile Filante de Ouagadougou	0–0 (5–3 pen.)	Rail Club du Kadiogo
2018	Salitas FC	0–0 (4–1 pen.)	ASF Bobo Dioulasso
2019	AS SONABEL	1–1 (4–3 pen.)	Rahimo FC
2020	Rahimo FC	3–2	Salitas FC
2021	AS SONABEL	2–1	ASFA Yennenga

=== Performances by club ===
Club	Title(s)	Seasons won
Étoile Filante de Ouagadougou	7	1994, 1996, 1999, 2003, 2006, 2011, 2017
ASF Bobo Dioulasso	4	1993, 1997, 2001, 2004
US des Forces Armées	3	1998, 2000, 2010
ASFA Yennenga	3	2002, 2009, 2013
RC Bobo Dioulasso	2	1995, 2014
US Ouagadougou	2	2005, 2008
Rail Club du Kadiogo	2	2012, 2016
AS SONABEL	2	2019, 2021
Commune FC	1	2007
Salitas FC	1	2018
Rahimo FC	1	2020
