= AS Maya =

- Full name: AS Maya
- Founded: 1995
- Ground: Stade de Bobo Dioulasso; Bobo-Dioulasso, Burkina Faso
- Capacity: 2,000
- League: Burkinabé Premier League

AS Maya is a Burkinabé football club which plays in the Burkinabé Premier League.

The club was founded in 1995.

== Stadium ==
Currently the team plays at the 2000 capacity Stade de Bobo Dioulasso.
