= KOZAF =

- Full name: Kassoum Ouédraogo Zico Académie de Football
- Ground: Stade Municipal; Ouagadougou, Burkina Faso
- Capacity: 25,000
- League: Burkinabé Deuxième Division
- 2025–26: 2nd in Group B
Away colours

Kassoum Ouédraogo Zico Académie de Football (or simply KOZAF) is a Burkinabé football club based in Ouagadougou. The team has played in the Burkinabé Premier League, but was delegated to the Burkinabé Deuxième Division after the 2020-2021 season. They play their home games at the Stade Municipal.

The club was founded by former international footballer Kassoum Ouédraogo.

The club colours are orange and yellow.
