= Coupe du Faso =

Football tournament in Burkina Faso

- Founded: 1961
- Region: Burkina Faso
- Current champions: Étoile Filante de Ouagadougou (23 titleS)
- Most championships: Étoile Filante de Ouagadougou (23 titles)
- 2024 Coupe du Faso

The Coupe du Burkina Faso is the top knockout football tournament in Burkina Faso.

== Winners ==
Year	Winner	Score	Runner-up
1961	RC Bobo Dioulasso		
1962	RC Bobo Dioulasso		
1963	Étoile Filante de Ouagadougou		
1964	Étoile Filante de Ouagadougou		
1965	Étoile Filante de Ouagadougou		
1966	US FRAN		
1967	US FRAN		
1968	US des Forces Armées		
1969	US FRAN		
1970	Étoile Filante de Ouagadougou	3 – 1	Bobo Sport
1971	US FRAN		
1972	Étoile Filante de Ouagadougou		
1974	US FRAN		
1975	Étoile Filante de Ouagadougou		
1976	Étoile Filante de Ouagadougou	6 – 1	Bobo Sport
1981	Silures Bobo-Dioulasso	3 – 0	Lambri Sports Wavigaja
1984	RC Bobo Dioulasso	4 – 0	US des Forces Armées
1985	Étoile Filante de Ouagadougou		
1986	ASF Bobo Dioulasso		
1987	RC Bobo Dioulasso		ASFA Yennenga
1988	Étoile Filante de Ouagadougou	2 – 0	ASF Bobo Dioulasso
1989	ASF Bobo Dioulasso		
1990	Étoile Filante de Ouagadougou	2 – 1	ASFA Yennenga
1991	ASFA Yennenga		
1992	Étoile Filante de Ouagadougou	2 – 1	Rail Club du Kadiogo
1993	Étoile Filante de Ouagadougou	2 – 0	ASF Bobo Dioulasso
1994	Rail Club du Kadiogo	1 – 0	RC Bobo Dioulasso
1995	RC Bobo Dioulasso		
1996	Étoile Filante de Ouagadougou		
1997	ASF Bobo Dioulasso		
1998	ASF Bobo Dioulasso	0 – 0 (7 – 6 pen)	US des Forces Armées
1999	Étoile Filante de Ouagadougou	3 – 2 (a.e.t.)	US des Forces Armées
2000	Étoile Filante de Ouagadougou	3 – 1	US Ouagadougou
2001	Étoile Filante de Ouagadougou	3 – 1	ASF Bobo Dioulasso
2002	US des Forces Armées	2 – 0	ASF Bobo Dioulasso
2003	Étoile Filante de Ouagadougou	0 – 0 (5 – 4 pen)	ASFA Yennenga
2004	ASF Bobo Dioulasso	0 – 0 (3 – 2 pen)	US des Forces Armées
2005	US Ouagadougou	2 – 0	ASF Bobo Dioulasso
2006	Étoile Filante de Ouagadougou	3 – 2 (a.e.t.)	RC Bobo Dioulasso
2007	RC Bobo Dioulasso	2 – 1	US Ouagadougou
2008	Étoile Filante de Ouagadougou	3 – 2	US Ouagadougou
2009	ASFA Yennenga	4 – 1	US des Forces Armées
2010	US des Forces Armées	1 – 0	RC Bobo Dioulasso
2011	Étoile Filante de Ouagadougou	0 – 0 (4 – 3 pen)	AS SONABEL
2012	Rail Club du Kadiogo	2 – 1	ASFA Yennenga
2013	ASFA Yennenga	2 – 1	AS SONABEL
2014	RC Bobo Dioulasso	1 – 0	Étoile Filante de Ouagadougou
2015	US des Forces Armées	3 – 0	ASF Bobo Dioulasso
2016	Rail Club du Kadiogo	2 – 0	AS SONABEL
2017	Étoile Filante de Ouagadougou	3 – 2	US des Forces Armées
2018	Salitas FC	2 – 0	ASF Bobo Dioulasso
2019	Rahimo FC	3 – 2	AS SONABEL
2020	Abandoned		
2021	ASFA Yennenga	1 – 0	ASF Bobo Dioulasso
2022	AS Douanes	1 – 0	US Ouagadougou
2023	Étoile Filante de Ouagadougou	3 – 0	Salitas FC
2024	Étoile Filante de Ouagadougou	0 – 0 (5 – 4 pen)	Rahimo FC

== Titles by club ==
Number of Coupe du Faso titles won by club
Club	Titles	Years won
Étoile Filante de Ouagadougou	23	1963, 1964, 1965, 1970, 1972, 1975, 1976, 1985, 1988, 1990, 1992, 1993, 1996, 1999, 2000, 2001, 2003, 2006, 2008, 2011, 2017, 2023, 2024
RC Bobo Dioulasso	7	1961, 1962, 1984, 1987, 1995, 2007, 2014
US FRAN	5	1966, 1967, 1969, 1971, 1974
ASF Bobo Dioulasso	5	1986, 1989, 1997, 1998, 2004
US des Forces Armées	4	1968, 2002, 2010, 2015
ASFA Yennenga	4	1991, 2009, 2013, 2021
Rail Club du Kadiogo	3	1994, 2012, 2016
Silures Bobo-Dioulasso	1	1981
US Ouagadougou	1	2005
Salitas FC	1	2018
Rahimo FC	1	2019
AS Douanes	1	2022
