= AS Douanes (Burkina Faso) =

AS Douanes or AS Douanes BF is a Burkinabé football team based in the capital of the country Ouagadougou, that competes in the Burkinabé Premier League.
