= Rahimo FC =

- Full name: Rahim Ouédraogo Football Club
- Founded: 2012; 14 years ago
- Ground: Stade Wobi; Bobo-Dioulasso, Burkina Faso
- Capacity: 10,000
- Chairman: Rachid Sorgho
- Manager: Mamadou Yentema
- League: Burkinabé Premier League
- 2025–26: Champions
- Website: rahimofc.com

Rahimo Football Club is a Burkinabé football team based in Bobo-Dioulasso, Burkina Faso, which competes in the Burkinabé Premier League.

== History ==
Rahimo Football Club was founded in 2012 in Bobo-Dioulasso by retired former Les Étalons player Rahim Ouédraogo.

Rahimo were crowned Burkinabé Premier League for the first time on 19 May 2019. On 22 July 2019, Rahimo were drawn against Nigerian champions Enyimba in the 2019–20 CAF Champions League Preliminary round.

=== Continental history ===
As of match played 26 October 2026

Competition	Pld	W	D	L	GF	GA
CAF Champions League	8	1	3	4	2	11
Total	8	1	3	4	2	11

Season	Competition	Round	Club	Home	Away	Aggregate
2019–20	CAF Champions League	Preliminary round	(Nigeria) Enyimba	1–0	0–5	1–5
2020–21	CAF Champions League	Preliminary round	(Nigeria) Enyimba	0–1	1–1	1–2
2025–26	CAF Champions League	First round	(Gabon) Mangasport	0–0	0–0	0–0 (4–2 (p))
2025–26	CAF Champions League	Second round	(Tunisia) Espérance de Tunis	0–1	0–3	0–4

== Stadium ==
Rahimo play their home games at the 10,000-capacity Stade Wobi.

== Honours ==
=== Domestic ===
- Burkinabé Premier League
  - Champions (3): 2018–19, 2024–25, 2025–26
- Coupe du Faso
  - Winners (1): 2019
- Burkinabé SuperCup
  - Winners (1): 2020

== Notable former players ==
- Issa Kaboré (youth)
- Lassina Traoré (youth)
