= Bouloumpoukou Sport FC =

Burkino Faso football club

- Full name: Bouloumpoukou Sport Football Club
- Ground: Stade Balibiè; Koudougou, Burkina Faso
- Capacity: 5,000
- League: Burkinabé Deuxième Division

Bouloumpoukou Sport FC is a Burkinabé football club which (as of 2021) plays in the Burkinabé Deuxième Division, having been relegated from the Burkinabé Premier League at the conclusion of the 2016–17 season.

== Stadium ==
Currently the team plays at the 5,000 capacity Stade Balibiè.
