= US Yatenga =

Yatenga
- Full name: Union Sportive du Yatenga
- Ground: Stade Ouahigouya; Ouahigouya, Burkina Faso
- Capacity: 5,000
- League: Burkinabé Premier League
Home colours

Union Sportive du Yatenga is a Burkinabé football club based in Ouahigouya in the north of the country. The club was formed after a fusion between Stade Yatenga and a smaller club and since 2005 it plays in the Burkinabé Premier League.
