= Stade Municipal (Ouagadougou) =

Stadium in Burkina Faso

Coordinates: 12°21′38″N 1°31′45″W

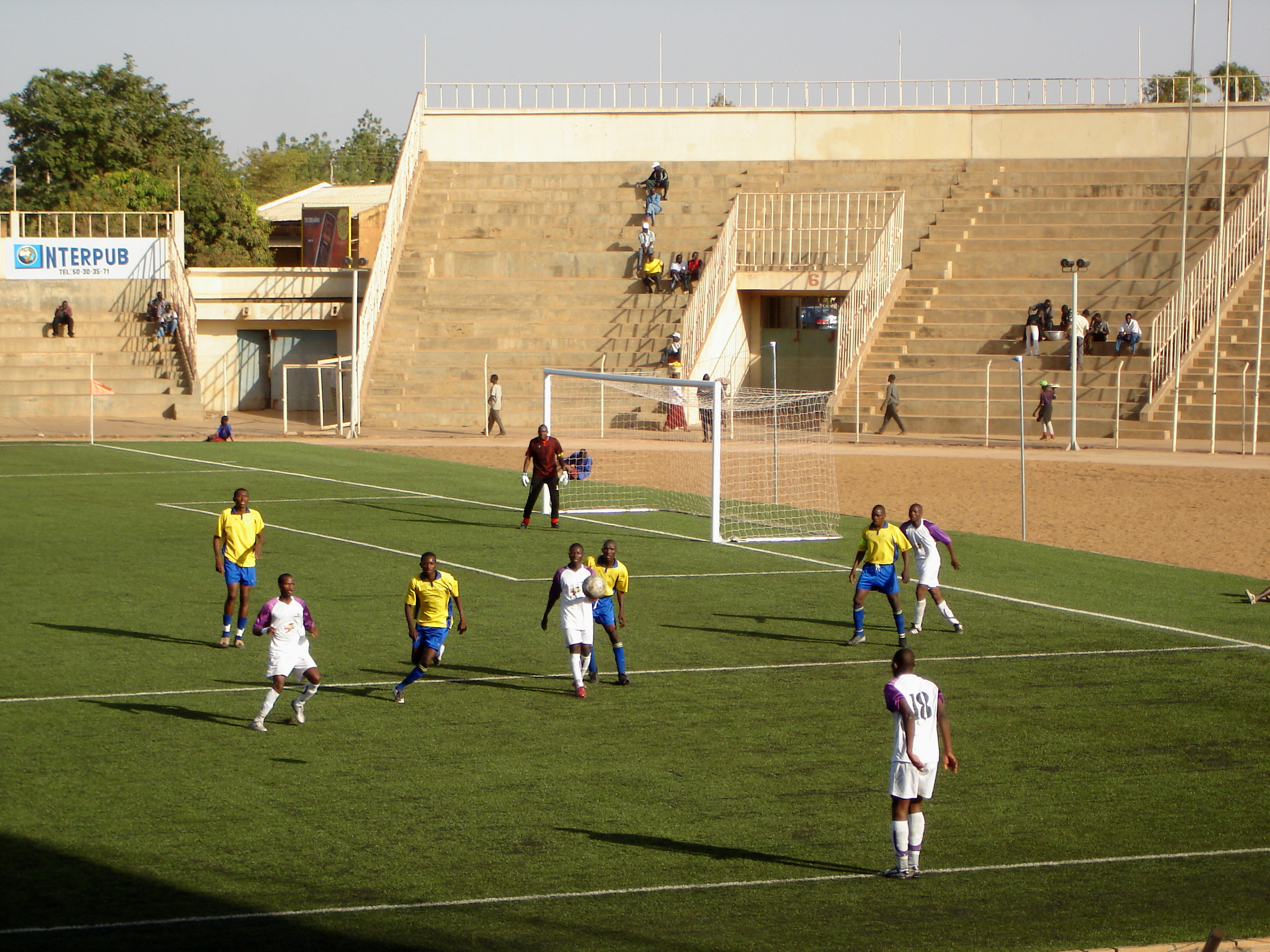
The stadium in 2008

Stade Dr. Issoufou Joseph Conombo is a multi-use stadium in Ouagadougou, Burkina Faso. It is currently used mostly for football matches and is the home of Santos Football Club. The stadium holds 25,000 people.
