= Salitas FC =

Football (soccer) club from Burkina Faso

Salimata et Taséré FC, known as Salitas FC, is a Burkinabé association football club, based in Ouagadougou.

They were promoted to the Burkinabé Premier League after the 2016–17 season. They stayed up in their first season after promotion, they are currently still in the Burkinabé Premier League. Their kits are green and orange in color and made by Sindio. They play their home games in the 29,800-capacity Stade du 4 Août.

== Honours ==
- Coupe du Faso: 1

2018.

- Burkinabé SuperCup: 1

2018.

== Performance in CAF competitions ==
- CAF Confederation Cup: 2 appearances

2019 – group stage
2020 – first round
