= Bobo Sport =

- Full name: Bobo Sport
- Founded: 1947
- Ground: Stade Wobi Bobo-Dioulasso; Bobo-Dioulasso, Burkina Faso
- Capacity: 10,000
- Chairman: Malick Akimbi
- League: Burkinabé Premier League
- 2017/18: 15th
Home colours

Bobo Sport is a Burkinabé football club based in Bobo-Dioulasso and founded in 1947. They play their home games at the Stade Wobi Bobo-Dioulasso.

The club was promoted to the country's first division for the 2006/2007 season by winning the play-offs against city rivals USFRAN Bobo-Dioulasso. As the team only finished 13th at the end of the season, it will have to play against the runner-up of Division 2 in the play-offs.

Several times, the club failed in the final of the cup competition.
