= US FRAN =

- Full name: Union Sportive du Foyer de la Régie Abidjan-Niger
- Founded: 1959
- Ground: Stade Wobi Bobo-Dioulasso; Bobo Dioulasso, Burkina Faso
- Capacity: 10,000
- League: Burkinabé Premier League
Home colours

Union Sportive du Foyer de la Régie Abidjan-Niger (US FRAN) is a Burkinabé football club based in Bobo Dioulasso. They play their home games at the Stade Wobi Bobo-Dioulasso.

The club plays in orange, white and red. It was founded in 1959, renamed USCB in 1989 and returned to the original name in 1998.

== Performance in CAF competitions ==
- African Cup of Champions Clubs: 1 appearance

1969: First Round
