= Santos FC (Burkina Faso) =

Burkinabé football club

Santos de Ouagadougou
- Full name: Santos Football Club (Ouagadougou)
- Founded: 10 April 1977; 48 years ago
- Ground: Stade Municipal; Ouagadougou, Burkina Faso
- Capacity: 15,000
- Chairman: Roger Kéré
- Manager: Aboubacar Cissé
- League: Burkinabé Premier League
- 2017–18: 16th
Home colours	Away colours

Santos FC Ouagadougou, known simply as Santos, is a Burkinabé professional football club based in Ouagadougou. They play their home games at the Stade Municipal. The club colours are red and black. The club was founded on 10 April 1977. It has won the 2nd division title three times, in 1986, 1991 and 1992.
