= US de la Comoé =

- Full name: Union Sportive de la Comoé
- Founded: 1985
- Ground: Stade Banfora; Banfora
- Capacity: 6,000
- Chairman: Nouhoun Coulibaly
- Manager: Arsène Soulama
- League: Second Division (II)
- 2024–25: 15th in Burkinabé Premier League
Home colours

US de la Comoé is a Burkinabé football club based in Banfora. They play their home games at the Stade Banfora. The club's colors are blue and yellow.

== Achievements ==
- Burkinabé Second League: 1

2001
