= Majestic FC =

Majestic
- Full name: Majestic Football Club
- Ground: Stade Municipal; Ouagadougou, Burkina Faso
- Capacity: 25,000
- President: Ousmane Nikiéma
- Head coach: Moustapha Gomnaoré
- League: Burkinabé Premier League
- 2025–26: 5th
Home colours	Away colours

Majestic Football Club, also known as Majestic or Majestic FC, is a Burkinabé football club based in Ouagadougou which plays in the Burkinabé Premier League.

== Stadium ==
Currently the team plays at the 25,000 capacity Stade Municipal.

== Notable players ==
Dango Ouattara, who came from the academy and now plays for Brentford FC in the English Premier League.
