= US Ouagadougou =

- Full name: Union Sportive de Ouagadougou
- Nickname: Les Unionistes
- Founded: 1961; 65 years ago
- Ground: Stade Municipal; Ouagadougou, Burkina Faso
- Capacity: 25,000
- Chairman: Félix Tiemtarboum
- League: Burkinabé Premier League
- 2017–18: 13th
Home colours	Away colours

Union Sportive de Ouagadougou is a Burkinabé football club based in Ouagadougou. They play their home games at the Stade Municipal.

The club plays in red and white. It was founded in 1961.

== Achievements ==
- Burkinabé Premier League: 2

1967, 1983

- Coupe du Faso: 1

2005

- Burkinabé SuperCup: 2

2005, 2008

== Performance in CAF competitions ==
- African Cup of Champions Clubs: 1 appearance

1968 – First Round
1984 – Preliminary Round

- CAF Confederation Cup: 2 appearances

2006 – Preliminary Round
2009 – First Round
