= ASF Bobo Dioulasso =

Football club based in Bobo Dioulasso

- Full name: Association Sportive des Fonctionnaires de Bobo Dioulasso
- Nickname: Les Buffles
- Founded: 20 January 1948
- Ground: Stade Municipal; Bobo Dioulasso, Burkina Faso
- Capacity: 30,000
- Chairman: Basile Paré
- Manager: Abdoulaye Yaroaga
- League: Burkinabé Premier League
- 2025–26: 12th place
Home colours	Away colours

Association Sportive des Fonctionnaires de Bobo Dioulasso, also known as ASF Bobo Dioulasso for short, is a Burkinabé football club based in Bobo Dioulasso. They play their home games at the Stade Municipal.

The club plays in yellow and black. It was founded on 20 January 1948.

== Achievements ==
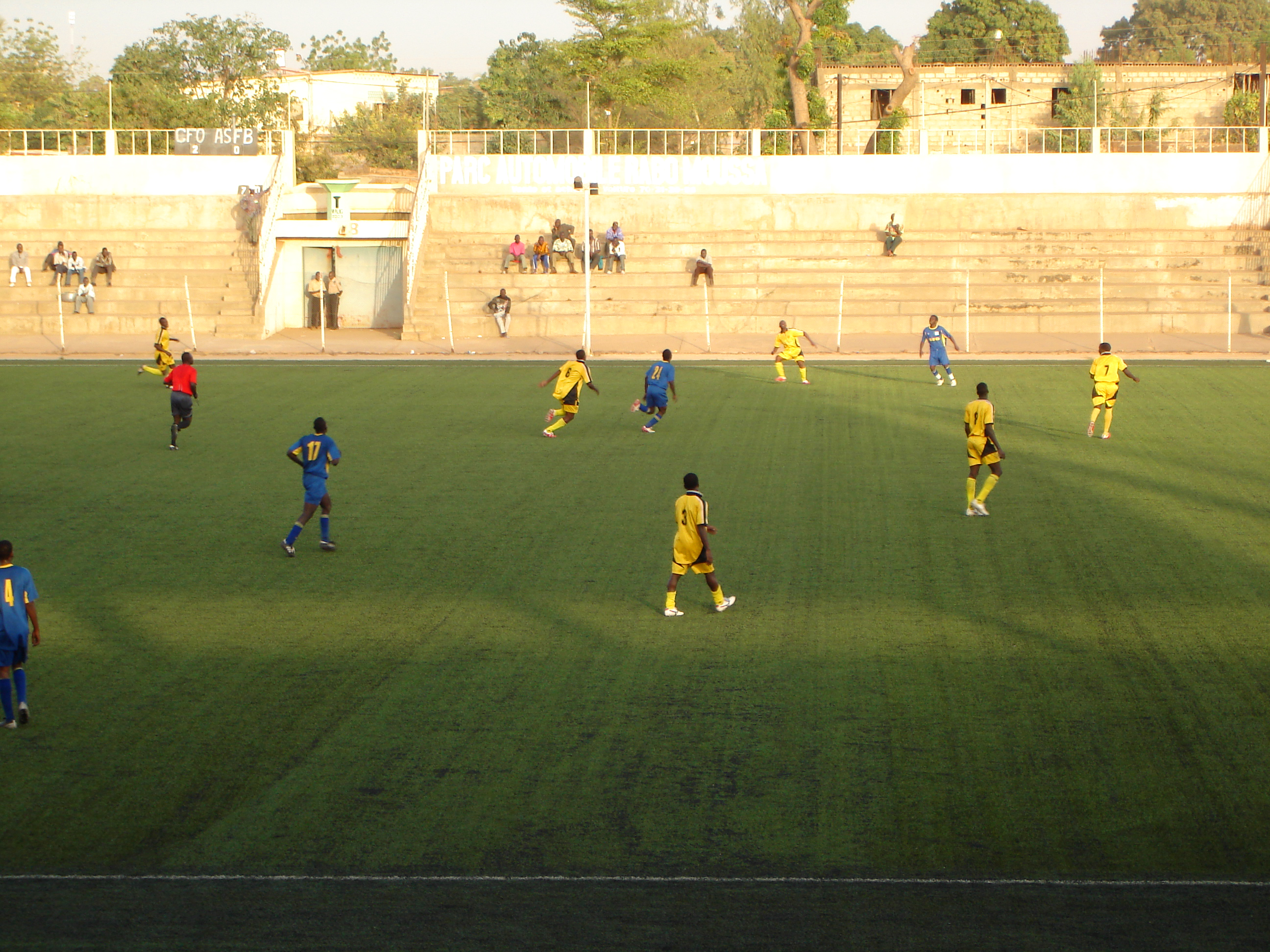
ASF Bobo-Dioulasso at CF Ouagadougou (Season 2007–08)

- Burkinabé Premier League: 3

1961, 1966, 2018

- Coupe du Faso: 5

1986, 1989, 1997, 1998, 2004

- Burkinabé Leaders Cup: 1

1992

- Burkinabé SuperCup: 4

1993, 1997, 2001, 2004

== Performance in CAF competitions ==
- African Cup of Champions Clubs: 2 appearances

1967 – First Round
1970 – First Round

- CAF Confederation Cup: 1 appearance

2005 – Preliminary Round

- CAF Cup Winners' Cup: 7 appearances

1986 – First Round
1989 – Second Round
1990 – First Round
1994 – First Round
1996 – First Round
1998 – First Round
1999 – First Round

== Current squad ==
Note: Flags indicate national team as defined under FIFA eligibility rules; some limited exceptions apply. Players may hold more than one non-FIFA nationality.

No.	Pos.	Nation	Player
—	DF	BFA	Abdramane Ouattara
—	DF	BFA	Boureima Ouattara
—	MF	BFA	Oumar Sanogo

No.	Pos.	Nation	Player
—	MF	KSA	Basil Al-Habib (captain)
—	MF	BFA	Assany Ouédraogo
—	MF	BFA	Souleymane Coulibaly
—	FW	BFA	Adama Sabo
