= Ligue 1 (Burkina Faso) =

- Founded: 1961
- Country: Burkina Faso
- Confederation: CAF
- Number of clubs: 14
- Level on pyramid: 1
- Relegation to: Deuxième Division
- Domestic cup(s): Coupe du Faso; Burkinabe SuperCup
- International cup(s): Champions League; Confederation Cup
- Most championships: ASFA Yennenga; Étoile Filante (13 titles each)
- Current: 2026–27 Ligue 1

Ligue 1, also known as Fasofoot Ligue 1 for sponsorship reasons, is the top division of the Burkinabé Football Federation. It was created in 1961.

== Burkinabé Premier League clubs (2021–22) ==
- AS Koupéla (Koupéla)
- AS Douanes (Ouagadougou)
- ASEC Koudougou (Koudougou)
- ASFA Yennenga (Ouagadougou)
- ASF Bobo (Bobo-Dioulasso)
- AS SONABEL (Ouagadougou)
- Étoile Filante (Ouagadougou)
- Kiko FC (Bobo-Dioulasso)
- Majestic (Pô)
- RC Bobo (Bobo-Dioulasso)
- RC Kadiogo (Kadiogo)
- Royal FC (Bobo-Dioulasso)
- Salitas FC (Ouagadougou)
- Vitesse FC (Bobo-Dioulasso)
- US Forces Armées (Ouagadougou)

== Previous winners ==
Previous winners are:

- 1961: ASF Bobo
- 1962: Étoile Filante
- 1963: USFR Abidjan-Niger
- 1963–64: USFR Abidjan-Niger
- 1965: Étoile Filante
- 1966: ASF Bobo
- 1967: US Ouagadougou
- 1968: USFR Abidjan-Niger
- 1969: ASFAN
- 1970: ASFAN
- 1971: ASFAN
- 1972: RC Bobo
- 1973: Jeanne d'Arc
- 1974: Silures
- 1975: Silures
- 1976: Silures
- 1977: Silures
- 1978: Silures
- 1979: Silures
- 1980: Silures
- 1981–82 : No competition
- 1983: US Ouagadougou
- 1984: ASFAN
- 1985: Étoile Filante
- 1986: Étoile Filante
- 1987: USFAN
- 1988: Étoile Filante
- 1988–89: ASFA Yennenga
- 1989–90: Étoile Filante
- 1990–91: Étoile Filante
- 1991–92: Étoile Filante
- 1992–93: Étoile Filante
- 1994: Étoile Filante
- 1995: ASFA Yennenga
- 1996: RC Bobo
- 1997: RC Bobo
- 1997–98: USFAN
- 1998–99: ASFA Yennenga
- 2000: US Forces Armées
- 2001: Étoile Filante
- 2002: ASFA Yennenga
- 2002–03: ASFA Yennenga
- 2003–04: ASFA Yennenga
- 2004–05: RC Kadiogo
- 2005–06: ASFA Yennenga
- 2007: Commune (Ouagadougou)
- 2007–08: Étoile Filante
- 2008–09: ASFA Yennenga
- 2009–10: ASFA Yennenga
- 2010–11: ASFA Yennenga
- 2011–12: ASFA Yennenga
- 2013: ASFA Yennenga
- 2013–14: Étoile Filante
- 2014–15: RC Bobo
- 2015–16: RC Kadiogo
- 2016–17: RC Kadiogo
- 2017–18: ASF Bobo
- 2018–19: Rahimo FC
- 2019–20: Cancelled
- 2020–21: AS SONABEL
- 2021–22: RC Kadiogo
- 2022–23: AS Douanes
- 2023–24: AS Douanes
- 2024–25: Rahimo FC
- 2025–26: Rahimo FC

== Qualification for CAF competitions ==
=== Association ranking for the 2025–26 CAF club season ===
The association ranking for the 2025–26 CAF Champions League and the 2025–26 CAF Confederation Cup will be based on results from each CAF club competition from 2020–21 to the 2024–25 season.

Legend

- CL: CAF Champions League
- CC: CAF Confederation Cup
- ≥: Associations points might increase on basis of its clubs performance in 2024–25 CAF club competitions
- Associations ranked 1–12 are eligible to enter two teams in each CAF club competition.

Rank			Association	2020–21 (× 1)		2021–22 (× 2)		2022–23 (× 3)		2023–24 (× 4)		2024–25 (× 5)		Total
2025	2024	Mvt	Association	CL	CC	CL	CC	CL	CC	CL	CC	CL	CC	Total
1	1	—	Egypt	8	3	7	4	8	2.5	7	7	10	4	190.5
2	2	—	Morocco	4	6	9	5	8	2	2	4	5	5	142
3	4	+1	South Africa	8	2	5	4	4	3	4	1.5	9	3	131
4	3	-1	Algeria	6	5	7	1	6	5	2	3	5	5	130
5	6	+1	Tanzania	3	0.5	0	2	3	4	6	0	2	4	82.5
6	5	-1	Tunisia	4	3	5	1	4	2	6	1	3	0.5	82.5
7	8	+1	Angola	1	0	5	0	2	0	3	1.5	2	2	55
8	7	-1	DR Congo	4	0	0	3	1	2	4	0	2	0	45
9	9	—	Sudan	3	0	3	0	3	0	2	0	3	0	41
10	11	+1	Ivory Coast	0	0	0	1	0	3	3	0	1	2	38
11	10	-1	Libya	0	0.5	0	5	0	0.5	0	3	0	0	24
12	12	—	Nigeria	0	2	0	0	0	2	0	2	0	1	21
13	15	+2	Mali	0	0	0	0	0	1	0	2	1	0.5	18.5
14	14	—	Ghana	0	0	0	0	0	0	1	3	0	0	16
15	13	-2	Guinea	2	0	1	0	2	0	0	0.5	0	0	12
16	19	+3	Botswana	0	0	1	0	0	0	1	0	0	0.5	8.5
17	21	+4	Senegal	1	2	0	0	0	0	0	0	0	1	8
18	17	-1	Mauritania	0	0	0	0	0	0	2	0	0	0	8
19	18	-1	Congo	0	0	0	1	0	1	0	0.5	0	0	7
20	16	-4	Cameroon	0	3	0	0.5	1	0	0	0	0	0	7
21	22	+1	Togo	0	0	0	0	0	1	0	0	0	0	3
22	22	—	Uganda	0	0	0	0	1	0	0	0	0	0	3
23	-	new	Mozambique	0	0	0	0	0	0	0	0	0	0.5	2.5
24	20	-4	Zambia	0	1.5	0	0.5	0	0	0	0	0	0	2.5
25	24	-1	Eswatini	0	0	0	0.5	0	0	0	0	0	0	1
25	24	-1	Niger	0	0	0	0.5	0	0	0	0	0	0	1
27	26	-1	Burkina Faso	0	0.5	0	0	0	0	0	0	0	0	0.5

== Performance by club ==
Club	City	Titles	Last title
ASFA Yennenga (includes Jeanne d'Arc)	Ouagadougou	13	2013
Étoile Filante	Ouagadougou	13	2013–14
Silures	Bobo-Dioulasso	7	1980
US Forces Armées (includes ASFAN and USFAN)	Ouagadougou	7	2000
RC Kadiogo	Kadiogo	4	2021–22
RC Bobo	Bobo-Dioulasso	4	2014–15
USFR Abidjan-Niger	Bobo-Dioulasso	3	1968
ASF Bobo	Bobo-Dioulasso	3	2017–18
Rahimo FC	Bobo-Dioulasso	3	2025–26
US Ouagadougou	Ouagadougou	2	1983
Commune	Ouagadougou	1	2007
AS Douanes	Ouagadougou	1	2022–23
AS SONABEL	Ouagadougou	1	2021

== Top goalscorers ==
Season	Goalscorer	Club	Goals
2002–03	(Burkina Faso) Dominique Nagaya	Ouagadougou	19
2003–04	(Burkina Faso) Jonathan Pitroipa	Planete	13
2003–04	(Mali) Mamadou Kanté	ASFA Yennenga	13
2004–05	(Burkina Faso) Hugues-Wilfried Dah	ASFA Yennenga	13
2005–06	(Burkina Faso) Mokhtar Ouedraogo	Forces Armées	15
2007–08	(Burkina Faso) Abderrahmane Diarra	Étoile Filante	16
2008–09	(Burkina Faso) Ocansey Mandela	ASFA Yennenga	13
2008–09	(Burkina Faso) Eric Soulama	Étoile Filante	13
2009–10	(Burkina Faso) Ocancey Mandela	ASFA Yennenga	15
2014–15	(Burkina Faso) Banou Diawara	Bobo-Dioulasso	13
2016–17	Salam Kagambeha	Forces Armées	12
2017–18	(Burkina Faso) Djibril Ouattara	ASF Bobo-Dioulasso	15
2018–19	(Burkina Faso) Hassamy Sansan Bah	Bobo-Dioulasso	15
2019–20	(Burkina Faso) Alassane Sawadogo	ASF Bobo-Dioulasso	9
2020–21	(Burkina Faso) Hassamy Sansan Bah	Douanes	22
2021–22	(Burkina Faso) Rodrigue Kam	Police	13
2022–23	(Ivory Coast) Salif Bagaté	Salitas	18
2023–24	(Burkina Faso) Clavert Kiendrebéogo	Douanes	10
2023–24	(Burkina Faso) Josué Tiendrebéogo	Majestic	10
2023–24	(Burkina Faso) Aboubacar Traoré	Sonabel	10
2023–24	(Burkina Faso) Honoré Yé	EFO	10
2024–25	(Ghana) Maxwell Boakye	Douanes	12

== Multiple hat-tricks ==
Rank	Country	Player	Hat-tricks
1	(Burkina Faso)	Aziz Djelbeogo	2
2	(Ivory Coast)	Salif Bagaté	1
2	(Burkina Faso)	Soungalo Diakite	1
2	(Burkina Faso)	Eric Soulama	1
2	(Burkina Faso)	Ernest Yelemou	1
