= AS SONABEL =

- Full name: Association Sportive de la Société Nationale d'électricité du Burkina Faso
- Nickname: Les Électriciens
- Founded: 1990; 36 years ago
- Ground: Stade de la SONABEL; Ouagadougou, Burkina Faso
- Capacity: 5,000
- Chairman: Gnoumato Bernard Ouattara
- Manager: Malo Kamou
- League: Burkinabé Premier League
- 2025–26: 13th place
| Home colours | Away colours |

Association sportive de la SONABEL is a Burkinabé football club based in Ouagadougou and founded in 1990. They play their home games at the Stade de la SONABEL. The club and its stadium take their names from the Société Nationale d'électricité du Burkina Faso (SONABEL; the National Electricity Company of Burkina Faso).

The club was founded in 1990. The club's colors are violet and white.

== Achievements ==
- Burkinabé Premier League
  - Winners: 2021
  - Runners-up: 2012, 2025
- Coupe du Faso
  - Runner-up: 2011, 2013, 2016, 2019
- Burkinabé SuperCup
  - Winners: 2019, 2021
  - Runner-up: 2013, 2016

== Performance in CAF competitions ==
- CAF Champions League: 1 appearance

2022 - First Round

- CAF Confederation Cup: 1 appearance

2014 – Preliminary Round
