= RC Bobo Dioulasso =

Burkinabé football club, based in Bobo-Dioulasso, Burkina Faso

- Full name: Racing Club de Bobo Dioulasso
- Founded: 1949; 77 years ago
- Ground: Aboubacar Sangoulé Lamizana; Bobo-Dioulasso, Burkina Faso
- Capacity: 50,000
- Chairman: Adama Tapsoba
- Manager: Brama Traoré
- League: Deuxième Division
- 2025–26: 15th in Burkinabé Premier League (relegated)
Home colours	Away colours

Racing Club de Bobo Dioulasso, also known as RC Bobo Dioulasso, is a Burkinabé professional football club based in Bobo-Dioulasso. They play their home games at the Stade Municipal.

The club colours are black and white. The club was founded in 1949.

== Current squad ==
Note: Flags indicate national team as defined under FIFA eligibility rules; some limited exceptions apply. Players may hold more than one non-FIFA nationality.

No.	Pos.	Nation	Player
—	DF	BFA	Boureima Galman
—	MF	BFA	Adama Guira
—	FW	BFA	Oumarou Nébié
—	FW	BFA	Banou Diawara

== Achievements ==
- Burkinabé Premier League: 4

1972, 1996, 1997, 2014–15

- Coupe du Faso: 7

1961, 1962, 1984, 1987, 1995, 2007, 2014

- Burkinabé Leaders Cup: 3

1993, 1997, 1998

- Burkinabé SuperCup: 2

1995, 2014

== Performance in CAF competitions ==
- CAF Champions League: 2 appearances

1997 – Preliminary Round
1998 – First Round

- CAF Confederation Cup: 1 appearance

2015 – Preliminary Round

- CAF Cup Winners' Cup: 2 appearances

1984 – First Round
1985 – withdrew in Preliminary Round

- CAF Cup: 1 appearance

1994 – First Round
