= ASFA Yennenga =

ASFA
- Full name: Association Sportive du Faso-Yennenga
- Nickname: Les Asfasiens
- Founded: 1947; 79 years ago
- Ground: Stade du 4-Août; Ouagadougou, Burkina Faso
- Capacity: 29,800
- Chairman: Moustapha Ouédraogo
- Manager: Mahamadou Kaboré
- League: Burkinabé Premier League
- 2025–26: 9th
Home colours	Away colours

Association Sportive du Faso-Yennenga is a Burkinabé football club based in Ouagadougou. The club's home games are played at Stade du 4-Août.

The club was founded in 1947 and won its first title in 1973 as Jeanne d'Arc.

== History ==
The club was founded in 1947 under the name of AS Jeanne d'Arc.

== Honours ==
- Burkinabé Premier League: 13

1973, 1989, 1995, 1999, 2002, 2003, 2004, 2006, 2009, 2010, 2011, 2012, 2013.

- Coupe du Faso: 3

1991, 2009, 2013

- Burkinabé SuperCup: 2

2001–02, 2008–09.

- West African Club Championship (UFOA Cup): 1

1999.

== Performance in CAF competitions ==
- CAF Champions League: 10 appearances

2000 – First round
2003 – First round
2004 – First round
2005 – First round
2007 – Preliminary Round
2010 – First round
2011 – First round
2012 – Preliminary Round
2013 – First round
2014 – First round

- African Cup of Champions Clubs: 3 appearances

1973 – First Round
1990 – Preliminary Round
1996 – First Round

- CAF Cup: 3 appearances

1993 – First Round
1998 – First Round
2002 – First Round

- CAF Cup Winners' Cup: 2 appearances

1991 – Quarter-finals
1992 – First Round

== Managers ==
- (Italy) Guglielmo Arena
- (Romania) Dan Anghelescu (2006–07)
- (Mali) Cheick Oumar Koné (2009–14)
- (Republic of the Congo) Michel Kigoma (2011)
