= US des Forces Armées =

Burkinabé association football club

USFA
- Full name: Union Sportive des Forces Armées
- Nickname: Les Bidasses
- Founded: 1962; 64 years ago
- Ground: Stade de l'USFA; Ouagadougou, Burkina Faso
- Capacity: 9,000
- Chairman: Alidou Bazié
- Manager: Aboubakary Kombary
- League: Burkinabé Premier League
- 2025–26: 2nd place
Home colours	Away colours

Union Sportive des Forces Armées is a Burkinabé professional football club based in Ouagadougou. They play their home games at the Stade de l'USFA. The club's colors are blue and red.

== Achievements ==
- Burkinabé Premier League: 7

1969, 1970, 1971, 1984 (as ASFAN), 1987, 1998, 2000

- Coupe du Faso: 4

1968 (as ASFAN), 2002, 2010, 2015

- Burkinabé Leaders Cup: 1

1996

- Burkinabé SuperCup: 3

1998, 2000, 2010

== Performance in CAF competitions ==
- CAF Champions League: 2 appearances

1999 – First Round
2001 – First Round

- African Cup of Champions Clubs: 1 appearance

1985 – withdrew in preliminary round

- CAF Confederation Cup: 2 appearances

2010 – Preliminary round
2011 – First Round of 16

- CAF Cup: 3 appearances

1995 – First Round
1997 – Second Round
2000 – First Round
