= Étoile Filante de Ouagadougou =

EF Ouagadougou
- Full name: Étoile Filante de Ouagadougou
- Nickname: Les Stellistes
- Founded: 1955; 71 years ago
- Ground: Stade du 4 Août; Ouagadougou
- Capacity: 29,800
- Chairman: Kassoum Ouédraogo
- Manager: Ousmane Compaoré
- League: Burkinabé Premier League
- 2025–26: 14th (Relegated)
Home colours	Away colours

Étoile Filante de Ouagadougou ("Ouagadougou Shooting Star") is a Burkinabé football club based in Ouagadougou. They play their home games at the Stade du 4 Août. The club's colors are blue and white.

== Honours ==
- Burkinabé Premier League: 13

1965, 1985, 1986, 1988, 1990, 1991, 1992, 1993, 1994, 2001, 2008, 2014

- Coupe du Faso: 23

1963, 1964, 1965, 1970, 1972, 1975, 1976, 1985, 1988, 1990, 1992, 1993, 1996, 1999, 2000, 2001, 2003, 2006, 2008, 2011, 2017, 2023, 2024

- Burkinabé SuperCup: 7

1993–94, 1995–96, 1998–99, 2002–03, 2005/06, 2010/11, 2016/17

== Performance in CAF competitions ==
- CAF Champions League: 2 appearances

2002 – First Round
2009 – First Round

- African Cup of Champions Clubs: 8 appearances

1966: First Round
1986: First Round
1989: First Round
1991: First Round
1992: First Round
1993: First Round
1994: First Round
1995: First Round

- CAF Confederation Cup: 3 appearances

2004 – First Round
2007 – First Round of 16
2012 – First Round

- CAF Cup: 3 appearances

1996 – First Round
1999 – Quarter-finals
2003 – First Round

- CAF Cup Winners' Cup: 2 appearances

1997 – First Round
2000 – First Round
