= 2024–25 MC El Bayadh season =

MC El Bayadh
2024–25 season
- President: Abdelkader Dahmani
- Head coach: Fouad Bouali (from 14 August 2024) (until 12 November 2024); Lotfi Amrouche (from 14 November 2024)
- Stadium: Zakaria Medjdoub Stadium
- Ligue 1: 12th
- Algerian Cup: Semi-finals
- Top goalscorer: League: Mohamed Toumi Sief (4 goals); All: Mohamed Toumi Sief; Islam Chahrour (4 goals)
- Biggest win: MC El Bayadh 4–0 NC Magra
- Biggest defeat: JS Kabylie 3–0 MC El Bayadh

The 2024–25 season, is MC El Bayadh's 3rd consecutive season in the top flight of Algerian football. In addition to the domestic league, MC El Bayadh are participating in the Algerian Cup. On June 27, 2024, The federal office approved the calendar for the 2024–25 Ligue 1 season with the aim of ending on May 31, 2025. The first round is scheduled for September 14, this delay is motivated both by an extended end of the 2023–24 season but also by the holding of early presidential elections which will take place on September 7, 2024. However, the Ligue de Football Professionnel decided to postpone the start of the Ligue 1 by a week, on September 21.

== Squad list ==
Players and squad numbers last updated on 5 February 2025.
Note: Flags indicate national team as has been defined under FIFA eligibility rules. Players may hold more than one non-FIFA nationality.

No.	Nat.	Name	Position	Date of birth (age)	Signed from
Goalkeepers
1	(Algeria)	Abdelkadir Salhi	GK	19 March 1993 (aged 31)	(Algeria) NC Magra
16	(Algeria)	Mohamed Alaouchiche	GK	11 April 1993 (aged 31)	(Algeria) ASO Chlef
40	(Algeria)	Nabil Bouchikhi	GK	28 February 2005 (aged 19)	(Algeria) Reserve team
Defenders
4	(Algeria)	Islam Chahrour	CB	20 March 1990 (aged 34)	(Saudi Arabia) Al-Sahel SC
5	(Algeria)	Yacine Zeghad	CB	29 November 2001 (aged 22)	(Algeria) ES Mostaganem
13	(Algeria)	Abdessamad Bounaama	LB	26 February 1994 (aged 30)	(Algeria)
14	(Algeria)	Oussama Yerou	CB	9 April 2001 (aged 23)	(Algeria) GC Mascara
20	(Algeria)	Zahreddine Benabda	RB	30 November 1997 (aged 26)	(Algeria) MSP Batna
21	(Algeria)	Belaid Kouar	CB	13 December 1989 (aged 34)	(Algeria) OMR El Annasser
24	(Algeria)	Kheireddine Benamrane	RB	8 July 1994 (aged 30)	(Algeria) ES Sétif
26	(Algeria)	Aïssa Boudechicha	LB	13 April 2000 (aged 24)	(France) Bordeaux
29	(Algeria)	Ismail Bounaama	RB	20 November 2003 (aged 20)	(Algeria)
Midfielders
3	(Algeria)	Tarek Lakhdari	DM	30 May 2003 (aged 21)	(Algeria) Reserve team
6	(Algeria)	Ammar El Orfi	DM	3 November 1998 (aged 25)	(Algeria) Free agent
8	(Algeria)	Alaeddine Belaribi	DM	17 October 1997 (aged 26)	(Algeria) SKAF Khemis Miliana
15	(Algeria)	Kheireddine Toual	AM	4 August 2001 (aged 24)	(Algeria) USM Alger
18	(Algeria)	Djamel Belalem	DM	12 August 1993 (aged 31)	(Algeria) WA Tlemcen
23	(Algeria)	Abdellah El Moudene	CM	11 February 1994 (aged 30)	(Morocco) IR Tanger
27	(Algeria)	Ilyes Atallah	AM	19 August 2001 (aged 23)	(Algeria) JS Saoura
Forwards
7	(Algeria)	Abdel Ali Hamadi	ST	13 November 2003 (aged 20)	(Algeria) CR Belouizdad
10	(Algeria)	M'hend Sediri	RW	15 March 1996 (aged 28)	(Saudi Arabia) Wej SC
11	(Algeria)	Mohamed Toumi Sief	ST	7 September 1994 (aged 30)	(Algeria) MC El Bayadh
19	(Algeria)	Abdelillah Barkat	ST	8 August 1996 (aged 28)	(Algeria) RC Relizane
22	(Algeria)	Ilyes Yaiche	RW	27 October 1997 (aged 27)	(Algeria) USM Khenchela
25	(Algeria)	Youcef Serraoui	RW	30 March 2000 (aged 24)	(Algeria) ES Sétif

== Transfers ==
=== In ===
==== Summer ====
Date	Pos	Player	Moving from	Fee	Source
31 July 2024	RB	(Algeria) Zahreddine Benabda	MSP Batna	Free transfer	
2 August 2024	DM	(Algeria) Mohamed Alaeddine Belaribi	SKAF Khemis Miliana	Free transfer	
5 August 2024	GK	(Algeria) Abdelkadir Salhi	NC Magra	Free transfer	
12 August 2024	CM	(Algeria) Mounir Belhaidja	CR Belouizdad	Free transfer	
14 August 2024	AM	(Algeria) Ilyes Atallah	JS Saoura	Free transfer	
14 August 2024	ST	(Algeria) Mohamed Said Benchoucha	ES Sétif	Free transfer	
14 August 2024	GK	(Algeria) Fouad Zegrar	JS Kabylie	Free transfer	
14 August 2024	CB	(Algeria) Abdelhak Sailaa	(Saudi Arabia) Al-Sadd FC	Free transfer	

=== Out ===
==== Summer ====
Date	Pos	Player	Moving to	Fee	Source
10 July 2024	CB	(Algeria) Adel Amaouche	ES Mostaganem	Free transfer	
13 July 2024	GK	(Algeria) Abdelkader Morcely	Paradou AC	Free transfer	
24 July 2024	FW	(Algeria) Kamel Belmiloud	JS Saoura	Free transfer	
24 July 2024	CB	(Algeria) Azzedine Berriah	JS Saoura	Free transfer	
18 August 2024	LW	(Algeria) Yasser Belaribi	ES Mostaganem	Free transfer	

==== Winter ====
Date	Pos	Player	Moving to	Fee	Source
5 February 2025	LB	(Algeria) Anis Khemaissia	(Libya) Al-Hilal SC	300,000 €	

== Competitions ==
=== Overview ===
Competition	Record								Started round	Final position / round	First match	Last match
Competition	G	W	D	L	GF	GA	GD	Win %	Started round	Final position / round	First match	Last match
Ligue 1	30	9	9	12	23	26	−3	30.00	—N/a	12th	19 September 2024	20 June 2025
Algerian Cup	5	3	1	1	4	1	+3	60.00	Round of 64	Semi-finals	4 January 2025	15 April 2025
Total	35	12	10	13	27	27	+0	34.29				

Updated to match played 20 June 2025
Source: Competitions

=== Ligue 1 ===
==== League table ====
Pos	Team	Pld	W	D	L	GF	GA	GD	Pts
10	CS Constantine	30	9	12	9	31	31	0	39
11	Olympique Akbou	30	9	10	11	24	23	+1	37
12	MC El Bayadh	30	9	9	12	23	26	−3	36
13	ASO Chlef	30	7	13	10	24	27	−3	34
14	ES Mostaganem	30	8	10	12	23	31	−8	34

Source: the-sports.org
Rules for classification: 1) points; 2) head-to-head points; 3) head-to-head goal difference; 4) goal difference; 5) total goals; 6) fairplay ranking; 7) playoff.

==== Results summary ====
Overall								Home						Away					
Pld	W	D	L	GF	GA	GD	Pts	W	D	L	GF	GA	GD	W	D	L	GF	GA	GD
30	9	9	12	23	26	−3	36	6	4	5	16	12	+4	3	5	7	7	14	−7

Last updated: 20 June 2025.
Source: Competitive matches

==== Results by round ====
Round	1	2	3	4	5	6	7	8	9	10	11	12	13	14	15	16	17	18	19	20	21	22	23	24	25	26	27	28	29	30
Ground	A	H	A	A	H	A	H	A	H	A	H	A	H	A	H	H	A	H	H	A	H	A	H	A	H	A	H	A	H	A
Result	L	L	L	W	W	L	D	L	L	L	D	W	W	W	L	W	D	W	D	D	W	D	W	D	L	D	D	L	L	L
Position	11	16	16	15	8	11	11	15	16	16	16	15	12	11	12	9	10	9	9	10	8	9	6	6	8	8	8	10	12	12

Updated to match(es) played on 20 June 2025. Source: Competitive matches
A = Away; H = Home; W = Win; D = Draw; L = Loss

==== Matches ====
The league fixtures were announced on 11 July 2024.

All times are local, WAT (UTC+1).

Win Draw Loss Postponed

19 September 2024 Round 1	ES Sétif	1–0	MC El Bayadh	Sétif
18:00	Djahnit 11' (pen.)	Report		Stadium: 8 May 1945 Stadium; Referee: Anes Azrine; VAR: Lahlou Benbraham

27 September 2024 Round 2	MC El Bayadh	0–1	US Biskra	El Bayadh
16:00		Report	Saâd 61'	Stadium: Zakaria Medjdoub Stadium; Referee: Ayoub Belhachemi

6 October 2024 Round 3	USM Alger	1–0	MC El Bayadh	Baraki
18:00	Ghacha 31'	Report		Stadium: Nelson Mandela Stadium; Referee: Tahar Boudjemâa; VAR: Lahlou Benbraham

12 October 2024 Round 4	CR Belouizdad	2–3	MC El Bayadh	Algiers
19:00	Slimani 32', 43'	Report	Barkat 5'; El Moudene 9'; Belaribi 48'	Stadium: Stade du 5 Juillet; Referee: Lahlou Benbraham; VAR: Fateh Harkat

19 October 2024 Round 5	MC El Bayadh	4–0	NC Magra	El Bayadh
16:00	Chahrour 32'; Benchoucha 69' (pen.); Serraoui 83'; Belalem 87'	Report		Stadium: Zakaria Medjdoub Stadium; Referee: Tayeb Benyabka

25 October 2024 Round 6	JS Saoura	1–0	MC El Bayadh	Béchar
16:00	Akacem 87'	Report		Stadium: 20 August 1955 Stadium; Referee: Abdelali Ibrir

2 November 2024 Round 7	MC El Bayadh	1–1	Paradou AC	El Bayadh
15:00	El Moudene 43' (pen.)	Report	Boulbina 10'	Stadium: Zakaria Medjdoub Stadium; Referee: Youcef Taieb Bouderbal

8 November 2024 Round 8	ASO Chlef	2–0	MC El Bayadh	Chlef
15:00	Agbagno 74' (pen.); Benchouya 81'	Report		Stadium: Mohamed Boumezrag Stadium; Attendance: 0 (close doors); Referee: Fateh Harkat

15 November 2024 Round 9	MC El Bayadh	0–1	MC Alger	El Bayadh
15:00		Report	Delort 46'	Stadium: Zakaria Medjdoub Stadium; Referee: Yahia Dehar

30 November 2024 Round 11	MC El Bayadh	1–1	ES Mostaganem	El Bayadh
15:00	Toumi Sief 80'	Report	Belkhadem 82'	Stadium: Zakaria Medjdoub Stadium; Referee: Ayoub Belhachemi

13 December 2024 Round 13	MC El Bayadh	1–0	MC Oran	El Bayadh
15:00	Toumi Sief 24'	Report		Stadium: Zakaria Medjdoub Stadium; Referee: Abdelali Ibrir

17 December 2024 Round 10	JS Kabylie	3–0	MC El Bayadh	Tizi Ouzou
17:30	Akhrib 30'; Berkane 75' (pen.); Boudebouz 86'	Report		Stadium: Hocine Aït Ahmed Stadium; Referee: Tahar Boudjemaa; VAR: Houssam Benyahia

21 December 2024 Round 14	Olympique Akbou	0–1	MC El Bayadh	Béjaïa
15:00		Report	Benchoucha 49'	Stadium: Maghrebi Unity Stadium; Referee: Abderahmane Sahraoui

28 December 2024 Round 15	MC El Bayadh	1–2	USM Khenchela	El Bayadh
15:00	Belaribi 50'	Report	Sameur 45'; Saâdou 52'	Stadium: Zakaria Medjdoub Stadium; Attendance: 0 (close doors); Referee: Mohamed Boutaraa

25 January 2025 Round 12	CS Constantine	0–1	MC El Bayadh	Constantine
16:00		Report	Chahrour 20'	Stadium: Chahid Hamlaoui Stadium; Referee: Rafik Aouina; VAR: Redouane Allou

11 February 2025 Round 16	MC El Bayadh	1–0	ES Sétif	El Bayadh
15:00	Benamrane 90+5'	Report		Stadium: Zakaria Medjdoub Stadium; Attendance: 0 (close doors); Referee: Mehdi Oukil

19 February 2025 Round 17	US Biskra	0–0	MC El Bayadh	Biskra
17:00		Report		Stadium: 18 February Stadium; Attendance: 0 (close doors); Referee: Said Aouina

27 February 2025 Round 18	MC El Bayadh	2–1	USM Alger	El Bayadh
15:30	Sediri 33'; Toumi Sief 47'	Report	Bimenyimana 71'	Stadium: Zakaria Medjdoub Stadium; Attendance: 0 (close doors); Referee: Abdelali Ibrir

6 March 2025 Round 19	MC El Bayadh	0–0	CR Belouizdad	El Bayadh
15:30		Report		Stadium: Zakaria Medjdoub Stadium; Attendance: 0 (close doors); Referee: Smain Hamlet

16 March 2025 Round 20	NC Magra	0–0	MC El Bayadh	Magra
15:00		Report		Stadium: Boucheligue Brothers Stadium; Referee: Hamza Bouslimani

5 April 2025 Round 21	MC El Bayadh	1–0	JS Saoura	El Bayadh
16:00	Barkat 89'	Report		Stadium: Zakaria Medjdoub Stadium; Referee: Tayeb Benyabka

11 April 2025 Round 22	Paradou AC	0–0	MC El Bayadh	Algiers
17:00		Report		Stadium: Stade du 5 Juillet; Referee: Haithem Ghouti; VAR: Anes Azrine

19 April 2025 Round 23	MC El Bayadh	2–1	ASO Chlef	El Bayadh
16:00	Toual 3'; Chahrour 30'	Report	Brahimi 58'	Stadium: Zakaria Medjdoub Stadium; Referee: Tahar Boudjemaa

26 April 2025 Round 24	MC Alger	0–0	MC El Bayadh	Algiers
17:00		Report		Stadium: Stade du 5 Juillet; Referee: Youcef Gamouh; VAR: Abderahmane Sahraoui

12 May 2025 Round 25	MC El Bayadh	1–2	JS Kabylie	El Bayadh
17:00	Zeghad 59'	Report	Ignatyev 45+1'; Mammeri 87'	Stadium: Zakaria Medjdoub Stadium; Referee: Alaa Bouab

18 May 2025 Round 26	ES Mostaganem	0–0	MC El Bayadh	Mostaganem
16:00		Report		Stadium: Mohamed Bensaïd Stadium; Referee: Fateh Harkat; VAR: Anes Azrine

27 May 2025 Round 27	MC El Bayadh	1–1	CS Constantine	El Bayadh
17:00	Toumi Sief 55' (pen.)	Report	Messibah 22'	Stadium: Zakaria Medjdoub Stadium; Referee: Ayoub Belhachemi

11 June 2025 Round 28	MC Oran	3–2	MC El Bayadh	Oran
17:00	Boukholda 13'; Bourdim 87', 90+5'	Report	Barkat 45+1'; Sediri 61'	Stadium: Ahmed Zabana Stadium; Referee: Tahar Boudjemaa

17 June 2025 Round 29	MC El Bayadh	0–1	Olympique Akbou	El Bayadh
17:30		Report	Gherbi 38'	Stadium: Zakaria Medjdoub Stadium; Referee: Abdelali Ibrir

20 June 2025 Round 30	USM Khenchela	1–0	MC El Bayadh	Khenchela
17:00	Bougoursa 78'	Report		Stadium: Amar Hamam Stadium; Referee: Zouhir Maansri

=== Algerian Cup ===
4 January 2025 Round of 64	Nasr El Fedjoudj	0–1	MC El Bayadh	Guelma
14:00		Report	Boudechicha 85'	Stadium: Boudjemaa Souidani Stadium; Referee: Mohamed Tahar Milia

10 January 2025 Round of 32	NRB Touggourt	0–2	MC El Bayadh	Touggourt
14:30		Report	Chahrour 90' (pen.); Sediri 90+3'	Stadium: Ali La Pointe Stadium; Referee: Abderahmane Sahraoui

11 March 2025 Round of 16	MC El Bayadh	0–0 (a.e.t.) (6–5 p)	Olympique Akbou	El Bayadh
15:30		Report		Stadium: Zakaria Medjdoub Stadium; Referee: Oussama Mekfoudji
	Penalties
	El Moudene (penalty missed); Yaiche (penalty scored); Belaribi (penalty scored); El Orfi (penalty scored); Chahrour (penalty missed) ? (penalty scored); Barkat (penalty scored); Yerou (penalty missed); Salhi (penalty scored)		(penalty scored) Rahmouni; (penalty scored) Bouhalfaya; (penalty missed) Bitam; (penalty scored) Hathat; (penalty missed) Ghanem; (penalty scored) Sabri; (penalty scored) Hamadouche; (penalty missed) Klileche; (penalty missed) Bachir

27 March 2025 Quarter-finals	MC El Bayadh	1–0 (a.e.t.)	ES Sétif	Baraki
22:00	Boudechicha 102'	Report		Stadium: Nelson Mandela Stadium; Referee: Anes Azrine; VAR: Redouane Allou
Note: The quarter-final games were played at neutral venues with the VAR technology.

15 April 2025 Semi-finals	CR Belouizdad	1–0	MC El Bayadh	Oran
18:00	Meziane 46'	Report		Stadium: Miloud Hadefi Stadium; Referee: Rafik Aouina; VAR: Nabil Boukhalfa

== Squad information ==
=== Appearances and goals ===
As of 20 June 2025

No.	Pos	Player	Nat	Ligue 1			Algerian Cup			Total		
No.	Pos	Player	Nat	App	St	G	App	St	G	App	St	G
Goalkeepers
1	GK	Abdelkader Salhi	(Algeria)	27	27	0	0	0	0	0	0	0
16	GK	Mohamed Alaouchiche	(Algeria)	3	3	0	0	0	0	3	3	0
40	GK	Nabil Bouchikhi	(Algeria)	0	0	0	0	0	0	0	0	0
Defenders
4	CB	Islam Chahrour	(Algeria)	24	21	3	0	0	0	0	0	0
5	CB	Yacine Zeghad	(Algeria)	11	9	1	0	0	0	0	0	0
13	LB	Abdessamad Bounaama	(Algeria)	10	6	0	0	0	0	0	0	0
14	CB	Oussama Yerou	(Algeria)	16	15	0	0	0	0	0	0	0
20	RB	Zahreddine Benabda	(Algeria)	25	20	0	0	0	0	0	0	0
21	CB	Belaid Kouar	(Algeria)	14	7	0	0	0	0	0	0	0
24	RB	Kheireddine Benamrane	(Algeria)	18	10	1	0	0	0	0	0	0
26	LB	Aïssa Boudechicha	(Algeria)	19	16	0	0	0	0	0	0	0
29	RB	Ismail Bounaama	(Algeria)	5	4	0	0	0	0	0	0	0
Midfielders
3	DM	Tarek Lakhdari	(Algeria)	5	1	0	0	0	0	0	0	0
6	DM	Ammar El Orfi	(Algeria)	12	9	0	0	0	0	0	0	0
8	DM	Alaeddine Belaribi	(Algeria)	30	27	2	0	0	0	0	0	0
15	AM	Kheireddine Toual	(Algeria)	16	10	1	0	0	0	0	0	0
18	DM	Djamel Belalem	(Algeria)	14	9	1	0	0	0	0	0	0
23	CM	Abdellah El Moudene	(Algeria)	22	18	2	0	0	0	0	0	0
27	AM	Ilyes Atallah	(Algeria)	21	11	0	0	0	0	0	0	0
Forwards
7	LW	Abdel Ali Hammadi	(Algeria)	23	10	0	0	0	0	0	0	0
10	RW	M'hend Sediri	(Algeria)	25	19	2	0	0	0	0	0	0
11	ST	Mohamed Toumi Sief	(Algeria)	22	10	4	0	0	0	0	0	0
19	ST	Abdelillah Barkat	(Algeria)	27	19	3	0	0	0	0	0	0
22	LW	Ilyes Yaiche	(Algeria)	6	3	0	0	0	0	0	0	0
25	RW	Youcef Serraoui	(Algeria)	9	5	1	0	0	0	0	0	0
Players transferred out during the season
~~16~~	GK	Aymen Mouyet	(Algeria)	0	0	0	0	0	0	0	0	0
~~12~~	LB	Anis Khemaissia	(Algeria)	15	15	0	2	2	0	17	17	0
~~5~~	CB	Abdelhak Sailaa	(Algeria)	6	3	0	0	0	0	0	0	0
~~22~~	CM	Mounir Belhaidja	(Algeria)	2	0	0	0	0	0	0	0	0
~~6~~	CM	Dalil Hassen Khodja	(Algeria)	12	11	0	0	0	0	0	0	0
~~9~~	ST	Mohamed Said Benchoucha	(Algeria)	14	10	2	0	0	0	0	0	0
Total				30		23	5		4	35		27

Last updated: 20 June 2025
Source: mondefootball.fr

=== Goalscorers ===
As of 20 June 2025

Includes all competitive matches.

No.	Nat.	Player	Pos.	L1	AC	TOTAL
11	(Algeria)	Mohamed Toumi Sief	ST	4	0	4
4	(Algeria)	Islam Chahrour	CB	3	1	4
10	(Algeria)	M'hend Sediri	RW	2	1	3
19	(Algeria)	Abdelillah Barkat	ST	3	0	3
9	(Algeria)	Mohamed Said Benchoucha	ST	2	0	2
26	(Algeria)	Aïssa Boudechicha	LB	0	2	2
23	(Algeria)	Abdellah El Moudene	CM	2	0	2
8	(Algeria)	Alaeddine Belaribi	DM	2	0	2
18	(Algeria)	Djamel Belalem	DM	1	0	1
25	(Algeria)	Youcef Serraoui	RW	1	0	1
24	(Algeria)	Kheireddine Benamrane	RB	1	0	1
15	(Algeria)	Kheireddine Toual	AM	1	0	1
5	(Algeria)	Yacine Zeghad	CB	1	0	1
Own Goals				0	0	0
Totals				23	4	27

=== Clean sheets ===
As of 20 June 2025

Includes all competitive matches.

					Clean sheets		
No.	Nat	Name	GP	GA	L 1	AC	Total
1	(Algeria)	Abdelkader Salhi	32	24	9	4	13
16	(Algeria)	Mohamed Alaouchiche	3	3	2	0	2
40	(Algeria)	Nabil Bouchikhi	0	0	0	0	0
		TOTALS		27	11	4	15
