= 2025–26 MC El Bayadh season =

MC El Bayadh
2025–26 season
- President: Mohamed Belhakat
- Head coach: Cherif Hadjar (from 15 July 2025) (until 7 October 2025); Mohamed Lacet (from 7 October 2025) (until 16 January 2026); Majdi El Kourdi (from 17 January 2026)
- Stadium: Zakaria Medjdoub Stadium
- Ligue 1: 16th (relegated)
- Algerian Cup: Round of 64
- Top goalscorer: League: Dhiyaeddine Benyahia (3 goals); All: Dhiyaeddine Benyahia (3 goals)
- Biggest win: MC El Bayadh 2–0 MB Rouissat
- Biggest defeat: JS Kabylie 4–1 MC El Bayadh
| Home colours | Away colours | Third colours |

The 2025–26 season, was MC El Bayadh's 4th consecutive season in the top flight of Algerian football. In addition to the domestic league, MC El Bayadh participated in that season's editions of the Algerian Cup. The Algerian Professional Football League (LFP) officially released the calendar for the 2025–26 Ligue 1 Mobilis season on July 10, 2025.

== Squad list ==
Players and squad numbers last updated on 31 January 2026.
Note: Flags indicate national team as has been defined under FIFA eligibility rules. Players may hold more than one non-FIFA nationality.

| No. | Nat. | Name | Position | Date of birth (age) | Signed from |
Goalkeepers
| 16 | (Algeria) | Mohamed Tayeb Cherif | GK | 12 July 1999 (aged 26) | (Algeria) NC Magra |
| 25 | (Algeria) | Abdennasser Djoudar | GK | 11 March 2001 (aged 24) | (Algeria) JS Saoura |
| 30 | (Algeria) | Nabil Bouchikhi | GK | 28 February 2005 (aged 20) | (Algeria) Reserve team |
Defenders
| 3 | (Algeria) | Sabri Benbrahim | LB | 19 October 1998 (aged 26) | (Algeria) HB Chelghoum Laïd |
| 4 | (Algeria) | M'Hamed Merouani | CB | 29 March 1987 (aged 38) | (Algeria) NC Magra |
| 12 | (Algeria) | Adel Haddad | LB | 7 January 2000 (aged 25) | (Algeria) JS Djijel |
| 14 | (Algeria) | Oussama Yerou | CB | 9 April 2001 (aged 24) | (Algeria) GC Mascara |
| 20 | (Algeria) | Zahreddine Benabda | RB | 30 November 1997 (aged 27) | (Algeria) MSP Batna |
| 23 | (Algeria) | Abdellah Meddah | RB | 8 March 1999 (aged 26) | (Algeria) ES Mostaganem |
| 26 | (Algeria) | Belaid Kouar | CB | 13 December 1989 (aged 34) | Unattached |
Midfielders
| 5 | (Algeria) | Adel Ghanem | DM | 20 January 2003 (aged 22) | (Algeria) Olympique Akbou |
| 8 | (Algeria) | Mortada Keniche | CM | 24 April 2000 (aged 25) | (Algeria) WA Mostaganem |
| 10 | (Algeria) | Khalid Dahamni | AM | 25 November 1999 (aged 25) | (Algeria) Free agent |
| 13 | (Algeria) | Seddik Senhadji | DM | 3 November 2000 (aged 24) | (Algeria) MC Oran |
| 18 | (Algeria) | Islameddine Kaidi | AM | 3 August 2000 (aged 25) | (Algeria) CA Batna |
| 21 | (Algeria) | Ahmed Mahboub | AM | 4 December 2005 (aged 19) | (Algeria) Paradou AC |
| 27 | (Algeria) | Ilyes Atallah | AM | 19 August 2001 (aged 24) | (Algeria) JS Saoura |
| 28 | (Algeria) | Mouatez Bouchoucha | CM | 29 June 2005 (aged 20) | (Algeria) ES Sétif |
Forwards
| 7 | (Algeria) | Lounes Adjout | ST | 1 January 2002 (aged 23) | (Algeria) Olympique Akbou |
| 9 | (Algeria) | Abdelhakim Amokrane | ST | 10 May 1994 (aged 31) | (Saudi Arabia) Bisha |
| 11 | (Algeria) | Hassen Taabli | LW | 6 September 2005 (aged 19) | Unattached |
| 15 | (Algeria) | Fodil Belkhadem | ST | 25 January 2002 (aged 23) | (Algeria) ES Mostaganem |
| 17 | (Algeria) | Kamel Belmiloud | RW | 23 July 1995 (aged 30) | (Algeria) JS Saoura |
| 19 | (Algeria) | Abdelillah Barkat | ST | 8 August 1996 (aged 29) | (Algeria) RC Relizane |
| 22 | (Algeria) | Ilyes Yaiche | RW | 27 October 1997 (aged 27) | (Algeria) USM Khenchela |
| 24 | (Algeria) | Dhiyaeddine Benyahia | LW | 13 July 2000 (aged 25) | (Algeria) CA Batna |
| 29 | (Algeria) | Abdelkader Chelali | ST | 1 May 2005 (aged 20) | (Algeria) Reserve team |

== Transfers ==
=== In ===
==== Summer ====
| Date | Pos | Player | Moving from | Fee | Source |
|---|---|---|---|---|---|
| 26 July 2025 | GK | (Algeria) Mohamed Tayeb Cherif | NC Magra | Free transfer | |
| 26 July 2025 | CB | (Algeria) Chemseddine Lakehal | NC Magra | Free transfer | |
| 26 July 2025 | CB | (Algeria) M'Hamed Merouani | NC Magra | Free transfer | |
| 26 July 2025 | LB | (Algeria) Adel Haddad | JS Djijel | Free transfer | |
| 26 July 2025 | LB | (Algeria) Omar Zeggai | WA Tlemcen | Free transfer | |
| 26 July 2025 | CM | (Algeria) Mortada Khir Eddine Keniche | WA Mostaganem | Free transfer | |
| 26 July 2025 | CM | (Algeria) Ahmed Amine Mahboub | Paradou AC | Free transfer | |
| 26 July 2025 | AM | (Algeria) Islam Eddine Kaidi | CA Batna | Free transfer | |
| 26 July 2025 | RW | (Algeria) Dhiya Eddine Benyahia | CA Batna | Free transfer | |
| 26 July 2025 | ST | (Algeria) Abdelhakim Amokrane | (Saudi Arabia) Bisha | Free transfer | |
| 11 August 2025 | DM | (Algeria) Adel Ghanem | Olympique Akbou | Free transfer | |
| 11 August 2025 | AM | (Algeria) Khalid Dahamni | Unattached | Free transfer | |
| 11 August 2025 | ST | (Algeria) Lounas Adjout | Olympique Akbou | Free transfer | |
| 30 August 2025 | DM | (Algeria) Oussama Chita | Unattached | Free transfer | |

==== Winter ====
| Date | Pos | Player | Moving from | Fee | Source |
|---|---|---|---|---|---|
| 31 January 2026 | GK | (Algeria) Abdennasser Djoudar | Unattached | Free transfer | |
| 31 January 2026 | DM | (Algeria) Seddik Senhadji | Unattached | Free transfer | |
| 31 January 2026 | LB | (Algeria) Sabri Benbrahim | HB Chelghoum Laïd | Free transfer | |
| 31 January 2026 | CB | (Algeria) Belaid Kouar | Unattached | Free transfer | |
| 31 January 2026 | AM | (Algeria) Hassen Taabli | Unattached | Free transfer | |

=== Out ===
==== Summer ====
| Date | Pos | Player | Moving to | Fee | Source |
|---|---|---|---|---|---|
| 26 July 2025 | MF | (Algeria) Alaeddine Belaribi | MB Rouissat | Free transfer | |
| 26 July 2025 | DF | (Algeria) Aïssa Boudechicha | ES Sétif | Free transfer | |
| 28 July 2025 | DF | (Algeria) Yacine Zeghad | MB Rouissat | Free transfer | |
| 29 July 2025 | FW | (Algeria) Mohamed Toumi Sief | ES Mostaganem | Free transfer | |
| 29 July 2025 | MF | (Algeria) Abdellah El Moudene | ES Mostaganem | Free transfer | |
| 2 August 2025 | DF | (Algeria) Kheireddine Benamrane | Olympique Akbou | Free transfer | |

==== Winter ====
| Date | Pos | Player | Moving to | Fee | Source |
|---|---|---|---|---|---|
| 19 January 2026 | DM | (Algeria) Oussama Chita | JS El Biar | Free transfer | |
| 21 January 2026 | CB | (Algeria) Khaled Bouhakak | MB Rouissat | Free transfer | |
| 31 January 2026 | GK | (Algeria) Abdelkader Salhi | JS Saoura | Undisclosed | |
| 31 January 2026 | DM | (Algeria) Ammar El Orfi | MB Rouissat | Undisclosed | |
| 31 January 2026 | LW | (Algeria) Oussama Khiari | Unattached | Free transfer (Released) | |

== Competitions ==
=== Overview ===
| Competition | Record | | | | | | | | Started round | Final position / round | First match | Last match |
| Competition | G | W | D | L | GF | GA | GD | Win % | Started round | Final position / round | First match | Last match |
|---|---|---|---|---|---|---|---|---|---|---|---|---|
| Ligue 1 | 30 | 2 | 11 | 17 | 17 | 40 | −23 | 6.67 | —N/a | 16th | 22 August 2025 | 5 June 2026 |
| Algerian Cup | 1 | 0 | 0 | 1 | 0 | 1 | −1 | 0.00 | Round of 64 | Round of 64 | 4 December 2025 | 4 December 2025 |
| Total | 31 | 2 | 11 | 18 | 17 | 41 | −24 | 6.45 | | | | |

Updated to match played 5 June 2026
Source: Competitions

=== Ligue 1 ===
==== League table ====
| Pos | Team | Pld | W | D | L | GF | GA | GD | Pts | Qualification or relegation |
|---|---|---|---|---|---|---|---|---|---|---|
| 12 | MB Rouissat | 30 | 9 | 9 | 12 | 30 | 35 | −5 | 36 | |
| 13 | ASO Chlef | 30 | 9 | 7 | 14 | 26 | 31 | −5 | 34 | |
| 14 | Paradou AC (R) | 30 | 7 | 3 | 20 | 35 | 54 | −19 | 24 | Relegation to Algerian League 2 |
| 15 | ES Mostaganem (R) | 30 | 4 | 7 | 19 | 18 | 52 | −34 | 19 | Relegation to Algerian League 2 |
| 16 | MC El Bayadh (R) | 30 | 2 | 11 | 17 | 17 | 40 | −23 | 17 | Relegation to Algerian League 2 |

Source: lfp.dz
Rules for classification: 1) Points; 2) Head-to-head points; 3) Head-to-head goal difference; 4) First half goal difference; 5) First half total goals; 6) Fairplay ranking; 7) Playoff.
(R) Relegated

==== Results summary ====
| Overall | | | | | | | | Home | | | | | | Away | | | | | |
| Pld | W | D | L | GF | GA | GD | Pts | W | D | L | GF | GA | GD | W | D | L | GF | GA | GD |
|---|---|---|---|---|---|---|---|---|---|---|---|---|---|---|---|---|---|---|---|
| 30 | 2 | 11 | 17 | 17 | 40 | −23 | 17 | 2 | 6 | 7 | 10 | 16 | −6 | 0 | 5 | 10 | 7 | 24 | −17 |

Last updated: 5 June 2026.
Source: Competitive matches

==== Results by round ====
| Round | 1 | 2 | 3 | 4 | 5 | 6 | 7 | 8 | 9 | 10 | 11 | 12 | 13 | 14 | 15 | 16 | 17 | 18 | 19 | 20 | 21 | 22 | 23 | 24 | 25 | 26 | 27 | 28 | 29 | 30 |
|---|---|---|---|---|---|---|---|---|---|---|---|---|---|---|---|---|---|---|---|---|---|---|---|---|---|---|---|---|---|---|
| Ground | H | A | H | A | H | A | H | A | H | A | H | A | H | A | H | A | H | A | H | A | H | A | H | A | H | A | H | A | H | A |
| Result | L | L | D | L | D | D | L | L | L | L | L | L | L | L | W | D | W | D | L | D | D | L | D | L | D | L | L | L | D | D |
| Position | 16 | 16 | 16 | 16 | 15 | 15 | 15 | 15 | 16 | 16 | 16 | 16 | 16 | 16 | 16 | 16 | 16 | 16 | 16 | 16 | 16 | 16 | 15 | 16 | 16 | 16 | 16 | 16 | 16 | 16 |

Updated to match(es) played on 5 June 2026. Source: Competitive matches
A = Away; H = Home; W = Win; D = Draw; L = Loss

==== Matches ====
The league fixtures were announced on 31 July 2025.

All times are local, WAT (UTC+1).

Win Draw Loss Postponed

| 22 August 2025 Round 1 | MC El Bayadh | 0–2 | CS Constantine | El Bayadh |
| 17:00 | | Soccerway; LFP | Rebiaï 27'; Khelfaoui 85' | Stadium: Zakaria Medjdoub Stadium; Referee: Nabil Boukhalfa |

| 29 August 2025 Round 2 | MB Rouissat | 1–0 | MC El Bayadh | Ouargla |
| 20:00 | Benkheira 43' | Soccerway; LFP | | Stadium: 18 February Stadium; Referee: Abdelali Ibrir |

| 5 September 2025 Round 3 | MC El Bayadh | 1–1 | ES Sétif | El Bayadh |
| 17:00 | El Orfi 46' | Soccerway; LFP | Zerrouki 33' | Stadium: Zakaria Medjdoub Stadium; Referee: Yahia Dehar |

| 13 September 2025 Round 4 | ASO Chlef | 2–0 | MC El Bayadh | Chlef |
| 17:00 | Benchouya 30'; Bekkouche 85' | Soccerway; LFP | | Stadium: Mohamed Boumezrag Stadium; Referee: Mehdi Oukil; VAR: Mustapha Ghorbal |

| 20 September 2025 Round 5 | MC El Bayadh | 1–1 | CR Belouizdad | El Bayadh |
| 16:00 | Bouhakak 84' | Soccerway; LFP | Çekiçi 52' | Stadium: Zakaria Medjdoub Stadium; Referee: Fateh Harkat |

| 29 September 2025 Round 6 | USM Alger | 1–1 | MC El Bayadh | Dar El Beïda |
| 16:00 | Mahrouz 90+4' | Soccerway; LFP | Benyahia 90+7' | Stadium: Omar Benrabah Stadium; Attendance: 0 (close doors); Referee: Youcef Taieb Bouderbal |

| 4 October 2025 Round 7 | MC El Bayadh | 1–2 | ES Ben Aknoun | El Bayadh |
| 15:00 | Amokrane 81' | Soccerway; LFP | Hachoud 13'; Djabout 58' | Stadium: Zakaria Medjdoub Stadium; Referee: Haitham Ghouti; VAR: Rafik Aouina |

| 17 October 2025 Round 8 | Olympique Akbou | 1–0 | MC El Bayadh | Béjaïa |
| 15:00 | Addadi 78' | Soccerway; LFP | | Stadium: Maghrebi Unity Stadium; Referee: Ala Bouab |

| 25 October 2025 Round 9 | MC El Bayadh | 0–2 | MC Oran | El Bayadh |
| 15:00 | | Soccerway; LFP | Aoudjane 35'; Kerroum 51' (pen.) | Stadium: Zakaria Medjdoub Stadium; Referee: Ayoub Belhachemi |

| 3 November 2025 Round 10 | JS Kabylie | 4–1 | MC El Bayadh | Tizi Ouzou |
| 17:45 | Sarr 30'; Merghem 49'; Mahious 76'; Malki 83' | Soccerway; LFP | Belmiloud 63' | Stadium: Hocine Aït Ahmed Stadium; Referee: Anes Azrine |

| 9 November 2025 Round 11 | MC El Bayadh | 0–1 | MC Alger | El Bayadh |
| 14:30 | | Soccerway; LFP | Tabti 75' | Stadium: Zakaria Medjdoub Stadium; Referee: Nabil Boukhalfa |

| 20 November 2025 Round 12 | Paradou AC | 2–0 | MC El Bayadh | Belouizdad |
| 14:00 | Lahmer 25'; Ramdaoui 47' | Soccerway; LFP | | Stadium: 20 August 1955 Stadium; Referee: Mehdi Oukil |

| 19 December 2025 Round 13 | MC El Bayadh | 1–2 | USM Khenchela | El Bayadh |
| 14:30 | El Orfi 87' (pen.) | Soccerway; LFP | Etouga 41', 71' | Stadium: Zakaria Medjdoub Stadium; Referee: Youcef Tayeb Bouderbal |

| 26 December 2025 Round 14 | JS Saoura | 2–1 | MC El Bayadh | Béchar |
| 15:00 | Mebarki 8'; Akacem 30' | Soccerway; LFP | Keniche 57' | Stadium: 20 August 1955 Stadium; Referee: Anes Azrine |

| 8 January 2026 Round 15 | MC El Bayadh | 1–0 | ES Mostaganem | El Bayadh |
| 14:00 | Belmiloud 80' (pen.) | Soccerway; LFP | | Stadium: Zakaria Medjdoub Stadium; Referee: Ayoub Belhachemi |

| 24 January 2026 Round 16 | CS Constantine | 1–1 | MC El Bayadh | Constantine |
| 17:00 | Rebiaï 8' (pen.) | Soccerway; LFP | Benyahia 59' | Stadium: Chahid Hamlaoui Stadium; Referee: Tayeb Benyebka |

| 4 February 2026 Round 17 | MC El Bayadh | 2–0 | MB Rouissat | El Bayadh |
| 15:00 | Adjout 1'; Keniche 72' | Soccerway; LFP | | Stadium: Zakaria Medjdoub Stadium; Referee: Mehdi Oukil |

| 8 February 2026 Round 18 | ES Sétif | 0–0 | MC El Bayadh | Sétif |
| 18:00 | | Soccerway; LFP | | Stadium: 8 May 1945 Stadium; Referee: Anes Azrine |

| 13 February 2026 Round 19 | MC El Bayadh | 0–1 | ASO Chlef | El Bayadh |
| 15:00 | | Soccerway; LFP | Farhi 90+2' | Stadium: Zakaria Medjdoub Stadium; Referee: Nabil Boukhalfa |

| 20 February 2026 Round 20 | CR Belouizdad | 0–0 | MC El Bayadh | Baraki |
| 22:00 | | Soccerway; LFP | | Stadium: Nelson Mandela Stadium; Referee: Yahia Dahar |

| 27 February 2026 Round 21 | MC El Bayadh | 0–0 | USM Alger | El Bayadh |
| 14:30 | | Soccerway; LFP | | Stadium: Zakaria Medjdoub Stadium; Referee: Abdelhafid Boudaa |

| 7 March 2026 Round 22 | ES Ben Aknoun | 1–0 | MC El Bayadh | Belouizdad |
| 15:00 | Sylla 18' | Soccerway; LFP | | Stadium: 20 August 1955 Stadium; Referee: Tayeb Benyebka |

| 13 March 2026 Round 23 | MC El Bayadh | 2–2 | Olympique Akbou | El Bayadh |
| 22:00 | Barkat 40'; Kaidi 74' | Soccerway; LFP | Bensaadallah 16'; Addadi 79' | Stadium: Zakaria Medjdoub Stadium; Referee: Abdelali Ibrir |

| 17 March 2026 Round 24 | MC Oran | 2–0 | MC El Bayadh | Bir El Djir |
| 22:00 | Kerroum 75' (pen.); Aoudjane 78' | Soccerway; LFP | | Stadium: Miloud Hadefi Stadium; Referee: Akram Mechairia |

| 5 April 2026 Round 25 | MC El Bayadh | 1–1 | JS Kabylie | El Bayadh |
| 18:00 | Barkat 31' | Soccerway; LFP | Boudebouz 39' | Stadium: Zakaria Medjdoub Stadium; Referee: Ayoub Belhachemi |

| 9 April 2026 Round 26 | MC Alger | 3–0 | MC El Bayadh | Douéra |
| 20:00 | Naidji 15'; Zunon 20'; Ferhat 40' | Soccerway; LFP | | Stadium: Ali La Pointe Stadium; Referee: Mehdi Oukil |

| 17 April 2026 Round 27 | MC El Bayadh | 0–1 | Paradou AC | El Bayadh |
| 17:45 | | Soccerway; LFP | Kohili 69' (pen.) | Stadium: Zakaria Medjdoub Stadium; Referee: Mustapha Smaïl |

| 8 May 2026 Round 28 | USM Khenchela | 2–1 | MC El Bayadh | Khenchela |
| 16:00 | Etouga 32'; Matouti 90+2' | Soccerway; LFP | Benyahia 54' | Stadium: Amar Hamam Stadium; Referee: Mohamed Guerid |

| 20 May 2026 Round 29 | MC El Bayadh | 0–0 | JS Saoura | El Bayadh |
| 17:45 | | Soccerway; LFP | | Stadium: Zakaria Medjdoub Stadium; Referee: Naïm Bouara |

| 5 June 2026 Round 30 | ES Mostaganem | 2–2 | MC El Bayadh | Sidi Ali |
| 17:00 | Namani 6'; Benzina 45+1' | Soccerway; LFP | Chelali 7'; Yaiche 73' | Stadium: Larbi Belhamiti Stadium; Referee: Abdennour Khalfallah |

=== Algerian Cup ===
| 4 December 2025 Round of 64 | MC Alger | 1–0 | MC El Bayadh | Douéra |
| 19:00 | Benhaoua 12' | Report | | Stadium: Ali La Pointe Stadium; Referee: Tayeb Benyebka |

== Squad information ==
=== Appearances and goals ===
As of 5 June 2026

| No. | Pos | Player | Nat | Ligue 1 | | | Algerian Cup | | | Total | | |
| No. | Pos | Player | Nat | App | St | G | App | St | G | App | St | G |
|---|---|---|---|---|---|---|---|---|---|---|---|---|
Goalkeepers
| 16 | GK | Mohamed Tayeb Cherif | (Algeria) | 5 | 5 | 0 | 0 | 0 | 0 | 5 | 5 | 0 |
| 25 | GK | Abdennasser Djoudar | (Algeria) | 10 | 10 | 0 | 0 | 0 | 0 | 10 | 10 | 0 |
| 30 | GK | Nabil Bouchikhi | (Algeria) | 1 | 1 | 0 | 0 | 0 | 0 | 1 | 1 | 0 |
Defenders
| 3 | LB | Sabri Benbrahim | (Algeria) | 3 | 3 | 0 | 0 | 0 | 0 | 3 | 3 | 0 |
| 4 | CB | M'Hamed Merouani | (Algeria) | 25 | 25 | 0 | 1 | 1 | 0 | 26 | 26 | 0 |
| 12 | LB | Adel Haddad | (Algeria) | 16 | 11 | 0 | 1 | 1 | 0 | 17 | 12 | 0 |
| 14 | CB | Oussama Yerou | (Algeria) | 23 | 21 | 0 | 0 | 0 | 0 | 23 | 21 | 0 |
| 20 | RB | Zahreddine Benabda | (Algeria) | 20 | 19 | 0 | 1 | 0 | 0 | 21 | 19 | 0 |
| 23 | RB | Abdellah Meddah | (Algeria) | 16 | 15 | 0 | 1 | 1 | 0 | 17 | 16 | 0 |
| 26 | CB | Belaid Kouar | (Algeria) | 4 | 3 | 0 | 0 | 0 | 0 | 4 | 3 | 0 |
| 31 | CB | Bilal Barkat | (Algeria) | 1 | 1 | 0 | 0 | 0 | 0 | 1 | 1 | 0 |
Midfielders
| 5 | DM | Adel Ghanem | (Algeria) | 18 | 6 | 0 | 0 | 0 | 0 | 18 | 6 | 0 |
| 8 | CM | Mortada Keniche | (Algeria) | 26 | 24 | 2 | 1 | 1 | 0 | 27 | 25 | 2 |
| 10 | AM | Khalid Dahamni | (Algeria) | 23 | 9 | 0 | 1 | 1 | 0 | 24 | 10 | 0 |
| 13 | DM | Seddik Senhadji | (Algeria) | 7 | 4 | 0 | 0 | 0 | 0 | 7 | 4 | 0 |
| 18 | AM | Islameddine Kaidi | (Algeria) | 27 | 16 | 1 | 1 | 0 | 0 | 28 | 16 | 1 |
| 21 | AM | Ahmed Mahboub | (Algeria) | 4 | 1 | 0 | 0 | 0 | 0 | 4 | 1 | 0 |
| 27 | AM | Ilyes Atallah | (Algeria) | 27 | 21 | 0 | 1 | 1 | 0 | 28 | 22 | 0 |
| 28 | CM | Mouatez Bouchoucha | (Algeria) | 7 | 0 | 0 | 1 | 0 | 0 | 8 | 0 | 0 |
Forwards
| 7 | ST | Lounes Adjout | (Algeria) | 22 | 17 | 1 | 0 | 0 | 0 | 22 | 17 | 1 |
| 9 | ST | Abdelhakim Amokrane | (Algeria) | 19 | 6 | 1 | 1 | 1 | 0 | 20 | 7 | 1 |
| 11 | LW | Hassen Taabli | (Algeria) | 0 | 0 | 0 | 1 | 1 | 0 | 0 | 0 | 0 |
| 15 | ST | Fodil Belkhadem | (Algeria) | 30 | 22 | 0 | 1 | 0 | 0 | 31 | 22 | 0 |
| 17 | RW | Kamel Belmiloud | (Algeria) | 24 | 12 | 2 | 1 | 0 | 0 | 25 | 12 | 2 |
| 19 | ST | Abdelillah Barkat | (Algeria) | 15 | 9 | 2 | 0 | 0 | 0 | 15 | 9 | 2 |
| 22 | RW | Ilyes Yaiche | (Algeria) | 7 | 2 | 1 | 0 | 0 | 0 | 7 | 2 | 1 |
| 24 | LW | Dhiyaeddine Benyahia | (Algeria) | 25 | 15 | 3 | 1 | 1 | 0 | 26 | 16 | 3 |
| 29 | ST | Abdelkader Chelali | (Algeria) | 7 | 2 | 1 | 0 | 0 | 0 | 7 | 2 | 1 |
Players transferred out during the season
| ~~13~~ | DM | Oussama Chita | (Algeria) | 11 | 10 | 0 | 1 | 1 | 0 | 12 | 11 | 0 |
| ~~2~~ | CB | Khaled Bouhakak | (Algeria) | 9 | 9 | 1 | 1 | 1 | 0 | 10 | 10 | 1 |
| ~~26~~ | LW | Oussama Khiari | (Algeria) | 12 | 4 | 0 | 0 | 0 | 0 | 12 | 4 | 0 |
| ~~1~~ | GK | Abdelkader Salhi | (Algeria) | 14 | 14 | 0 | 1 | 1 | 0 | 15 | 15 | 0 |
| ~~6~~ | DM | Ammar El Orfi | (Algeria) | 11 | 10 | 2 | 0 | 0 | 0 | 11 | 10 | 2 |
| Total | | | | 30 | | 17 | 1 | | 0 | 31 | | 17 |

Last updated: 5 June 2026
Source: soccerway.com

=== Goalscorers ===
As of 5 June 2026

Includes all competitive matches.

| No. | Nat. | Player | Pos. | L1 | AC | TOTAL |
|---|---|---|---|---|---|---|
| 27 | (Algeria) | Dhiyaeddine Benyahia | LW | 3 | 0 | 3 |
| 17 | (Algeria) | Kamel Belmiloud | RW | 2 | 0 | 2 |
| 8 | (Algeria) | Mortada Keniche | DM | 2 | 0 | 2 |
| 19 | (Algeria) | Abdelillah Barkat | ST | 2 | 0 | 2 |
| 9 | (Algeria) | Abdelhakim Amokrane | ST | 1 | 0 | 1 |
| 18 | (Algeria) | Islameddine Kaidi | AM | 1 | 0 | 1 |
| 29 | (Algeria) | Abdelkader Chelali | ST | 1 | 0 | 1 |
| 22 | (Algeria) | Ilyes Yaiche | RW | 1 | 0 | 1 |
Players transferred out during the season
| ~~6~~ | (Algeria) | Ammar El Orfi | DM | 2 | 0 | 2 |
| ~~2~~ | (Algeria) | Khaled Bouhakak | CB | 1 | 0 | 1 |
| Own Goals | | | | 0 | 0 | 0 |
| Totals | | | | 17 | 0 | 17 |

=== Clean sheets ===
As of 5 June 2026

Includes all competitive matches.

| | | | | | Clean sheets | | |
| No. | Nat | Name | GP | GA | L 1 | AC | Total |
|---|---|---|---|---|---|---|---|
| 16 | (Algeria) | Mohamed Tayeb Cherif | 5 | 2 | 3 | 0 | 3 |
| 25 | (Algeria) | Abdennasser Djoudar | 10 | 12 | 3 | 0 | 3 |
| 30 | (Algeria) | Nabil Bouchikhi | 1 | 2 | 0 | 0 | 0 |
Players transferred out during the season
| ~~1~~ | (Algeria) | Abdelkader Salhi | 15 | 25 | 0 | 0 | 0 |
| | | TOTALS | | 41 | 6 | 0 | 6 |
