= 2023–24 MC El Bayadh season =

MC El Bayadh
2023–24 season
- President: Abdelkader Dahmani
- Head coach: Abdennour Hamici (from 13 August 2023) (until 2 October 2023); Abdelhaq Belaid (from 2 October 2023) (until 6 February 2024); El Hadi Khezzar (from 10 February 2024) (until 19 March 2024); Larbi Morsli (from 1 April 2024) (until 23 May 2024); Abdelhaq Belaid (from 23 May 2024)
- Stadium: Zakaria Medjdoub Stadium
- Ligue 1: 11th
- Algerian Cup: Round of 64
- Top goalscorer: League: Kamel Belmiloud (8 goals); All: Kamel Belmiloud (8 goals)
- Biggest win: MC El Bayadh 4–0 US Souf
- Biggest defeat: MC Alger 2–0 MC El Bayadh
Home colours	Away colours	Third colours

The 2023–24 season, is MC El Bayadh's 2nd consecutive season in the top flight of Algerian football. In addition to the domestic league, MC El Bayadh are participating in the Algerian Cup.

On December 20, 2023 MC El Bayadh Bus overturned following an accident near Sougueur in the Wilaya of Tiaret, two died according to the Gendarmerie Nationale. The two who died are assistant coach Khaled Meftah and goalkeeper Zakaria Bouziani. Following the tragic accident, the Algerian Football Federation has decided to suspend all football activities planned for the weekend throughout the national territory.

== Squad list ==
Players and squad numbers last updated on 5 February 2024.
Note: Flags indicate national team as has been defined under FIFA eligibility rules. Players may hold more than one non-FIFA nationality.

No.	Nat.	Position	Name	Date of Birth (Age)	Signed from
Goalkeepers
1	(Algeria)	GK	Abdelkader Morcely	17 September 1995 (aged 27)	(Algeria) HB Chelghoum Laïd
16	(Algeria)	GK	Abdeselem Naili	12 December 1997 (aged 26)	(Algeria) IRB Ouargla
30	(Algeria)	GK	Ali Hamzaoui	7 January 2003 (aged 20)	(Algeria) JS Ben Daoud
Defenders
2	(Algeria)	CB	Abdeldjalil Bahoussi	5 August 1993 (aged 30)	(Algeria) JS Saoura
5	(Algeria)	CB	Mohamed El Amine Barka	20 March 1993 (aged 30)	(Algeria) RC Relizane
13	(Algeria)	LB	Abdessamad Bounaama	26 February 1994 (aged 29)	(Algeria)
12	(Algeria)	LB	Anis Khemaissia	27 January 1999 (aged 24)	(Algeria) HB Chelghoum Laïd
14	(Algeria)	CB	Adel Amaouche	4 November 1999 (aged 23)	(Algeria) MO Béjaïa
15	(Algeria)	CB	Azzedine Berriah	16 June 1999 (aged 24)	(Algeria)
21	(Algeria)	CB	Belaid Kouar	13 December 1989 (aged 33)	(Algeria) OMR El Annasser
24	(Algeria)	RB	Kheireddine Benamrane	8 July 1994 (aged 29)	(Algeria) ES Sétif
26	(Algeria)	LB	Aïssa Boudechicha	13 April 2000 (aged 23)	(France) Bordeaux B
Midfielders
4	(Algeria)	MF	Brahim Zouad	13 April 2001 (aged 22)	(Algeria) HB Chelghoum Laïd
6	(Algeria)	MF	Abdenour Abbes	24 October 1994 (aged 28)	(Algeria) ES Mostaganem
8	(Algeria)	MF	El Amine Antar	22 October 1991 (aged 31)	(Algeria) JSM Tiaret
9	(Algeria)	MF	Ramzi Tennah	22 April 2001 (aged 22)	(Algeria) MC Oran
17	(Algeria)	MF	Benamar Mellal	9 August 1993 (aged 30)	(Algeria) JS Saoura
18	(Algeria)	MF	Djamel Belalem	12 August 1993 (aged 30)	(Algeria) WA Tlemcen
22	(Algeria)	MF	Nacer Benzid	20 February 2001 (aged 22)	(Algeria)
23	(Algeria)	AM	Abdellah El Moudene	11 February 1994 (aged 29)	(Algeria) Free agent
25	(Algeria)	MF	Youcef Serraoui	30 March 2000 (aged 23)	(Algeria) ES Sétif
Forwards
3	(Algeria)	FW	Ahmed Ghenam	31 March 1998 (aged 25)	(Algeria)
7	(Algeria)	FW	Yasser Belaribi	22 June 1999 (aged 23)	(Algeria) MC Oran
10	(Algeria)	FW	M'hend Sediri	15 March 1996 (aged 27)	(Saudi Arabia) Wej SC
11	(Algeria)	FW	Mohammed Brahimi	23 November 1997 (aged 25)	(Algeria) MC Saïda
19	(Algeria)	FW	Abdelillah Barkat	8 August 1996 (aged 27)	(Algeria) RC Relizane
20	(Algeria)	FW	Ibrahim Morsli	15 February 2000 (aged 22)	(Algeria) US Souf
27	(Algeria)	FW	Kamel Belmiloud	23 July 1995 (aged 28)	(Algeria) ES Mostaganem

== Transfers ==
=== In ===
==== Summer ====
Date	Pos	Player	Moving from	Fee	Source
14 August 2023	MF	(Algeria) Abdenour Abbes	ES Mostaganem	Free transfer	
19 August 2023	FW	(Algeria) Kamel Belmiloud	ES Mostaganem	Free transfer	
19 August 2023	DF	(Algeria) Aïssa Boudechicha	(France) Bordeaux B	Free transfer	
19 August 2023	GK	(Algeria) Ali Hamzaoui	JS Ben Daoud	Free transfer	
19 August 2023	MF	(Algeria) Brahim Zouad	HB Chelghoum Laïd	Free transfer	
22 August 2023	FW	(Algeria) Oussama Aggar	(Saudi Arabia) Al-Sharq	Free transfer	

==== Winter ====
Date	Pos	Player	Moving from	Fee	Source
5 February 2024	GK	(Algeria) Abdeselem Naili	IRB Ouargla	Free transfer	
5 February 2024	MF	(Algeria) Ramzi Tennah	MC Oran	Free transfer	
5 February 2024	MF	(Algeria) Abdellah El Moudene	Free agent	Free transfer	
5 February 2024	FW	(Algeria) Ibrahim Morsli	US Souf	Free transfer	
5 February 2024	FW	(Algeria) M'hend Sediri	(Saudi Arabia) Wej SC	Free transfer	

=== Out ===
==== Summer ====
Date	Pos	Player	Moving to	Fee	Source
1 August 2023	MF	(Algeria) Omar Embarek	USM Alger	Free transfer	
14 August 2023	FW	(Algeria) Hicham Khalfallah	JS Saoura	Free transfer	

=== Out ===
==== Winter ====
Date	Pos	Player	Moving to	Fee	Source
27 January 2024	FW	(Algeria) Oussama Aggar	Oman Club	Free transfer	
4 February 2024	FW	(Algeria) Ramdane Hitala	ES Sétif	Free transfer	

== Competitions ==
=== Overview ===
Competition	Record								Started round	Final position / round	First match	Last match
Competition	G	W	D	L	GF	GA	GD	Win %	Started round	Final position / round	First match	Last match
Ligue 1	30	10	8	12	29	30	−1	33.33	—N/a	11th	15 September 2023	14 June 2024
Algerian Cup	1	0	1	0	1	1	+0	0.00	Round of 64	Round of 64	19 February 2024	19 February 2024
Total	31	10	9	12	30	31	−1	32.26				

Updated to match played 14 June 2024
Source: Competitions

=== Ligue 1 ===
==== League table ====
Pos	Team	Pld	W	D	L	GF	GA	GD	Pts
9	JS Saoura	30	11	7	12	34	37	−3	40
10	USM Khenchela	30	11	6	13	33	39	−6	39
11	MC El Bayadh	30	10	8	12	29	30	−1	38
12	NC Magra	30	9	11	10	30	32	−2	38
13	MC Oran	30	9	9	12	26	33	−7	36

Source: the-sports.org
Rules for classification: 1) points; 2) head-to-head points; 3) head-to-head goal difference; 4) goal difference; 5) total goals; 6) fairplay ranking; 7) playoff.

==== Results summary ====
Overall								Home						Away					
Pld	W	D	L	GF	GA	GD	Pts	W	D	L	GF	GA	GD	W	D	L	GF	GA	GD
30	10	8	12	29	30	−1	38	9	3	3	18	8	+10	1	5	9	11	22	−11

Last updated: 14 June 2024.
Source: Competitive matches

==== Results by round ====
Round	1	2	3	4	5	6	7	8	9	10	11	12	13	14	15	16	17	18	19	20	21	22	23	24	25	26	27	28	29	30
Ground	H	A	A	H	A	H	A	H	A	H	A	H	A	H	A	A	H	H	A	H	A	H	A	H	A	H	A	H	A	H
Result	W	L	L	W	D	W	D	W	L	D	D	W	D	L	D	L	W	D	L	L	W	L	L	W	L	D	L	W	L	W
Position	6	11	13	10	11	4	4	4	7	7	7	6	8	9	10	11	9	9	9	11	9	10	11	10	11	12	13	11	14	11

Updated to match(es) played on 14 June 2024. Source: Competitive matches
A = Away; H = Home; W = Win; D = Draw; L = Loss

==== Matches ====
The league fixtures were announced on 24 August 2023.

All times are local, WAT (UTC+1).

Win Draw Loss Postponed

15 September 2023 Round 1	MC El Bayadh	1–0	CS Constantine	El Bayadh
16:00	Ghenam 41'	Report		Stadium: Zakaria Medjdoub Stadium; Referee: Lotfi Bekouassa

23 September 2023 Round 2	ES Sétif	2–1	MC El Bayadh	Sétif
19:00	Lahmeri 67'; Coulibaly 78' (pen.)	Report	Hitala 80'	Stadium: 8 May 1945 Stadium; Referee: Anes Azrine

30 September 2023 Round 3	MC Alger	2–0	MC El Bayadh	Dar El Beïda
16:00	Dao 13'; Belaïli 73'			Stadium: Omar Benrabah Stadium; Referee: Ali Nader

7 October 2023 Round 4	MC El Bayadh	1–0	ASO Chlef	El Bayadh
15:45	Hitala 18'	Report		Stadium: Zakaria Medjdoub Stadium; Referee: Hamza Bouslimani

11 November 2023 Round 5	JS Saoura	0–0	MC El Bayadh	Béchar
18:00		Report		Stadium: 20 August 1955 Stadium; Referee: Nabil Boukhalfa

17 November 2023 Round 6	MC El Bayadh	4–0	US Souf	El Bayadh
15:30	Belmiloud 11', 49'; Berriah 81'; Belaribi 83'	Report		Stadium: Zakaria Medjdoub Stadium; Referee: Mohamed Saidi

24 November 2023 Round 7	NC Magra	1–1	MC El Bayadh	Magra
15:15	Khemaissia 63' (o.g.)	Report	Ghenam 75'	Stadium: Boucheligue Brothers Stadium; Referee: Akram Mechairia

1 December 2023 Round 8	MC El Bayadh	1–0	Paradou AC	El Bayadh
15:15	Belmiloud 90' (pen.)	Report		Stadium: Zakaria Medjdoub Stadium; Referee: Yahia Dahar

8 December 2023 Round 9	USM Khenchela	2–0	MC El Bayadh	Khenchela
15:15	Yaiche 11'; Baakoh 90+3'	Report		Stadium: Amar Hamam Stadium; Referee: Houssam Benyahia

15 December 2023 Round 10	MC El Bayadh	1–1	USM Alger	El Bayadh
15:15	Barka 56'	Report	Belkacemi 76'	Stadium: Zakaria Medjdoub Stadium; Referee: Lahlou Benbraham

13 January 2024 Round 13	US Biskra	0–0	MC El Bayadh	Biskra
16:00		Report		Stadium: 18 February Stadium; Referee: Lyes Bekouassa

19 January 2024 Round 14	MC El Bayadh	0–1	MC Oran	El Bayadh
15:30		Report	Motrani 63'	Stadium: Zakaria Medjdoub Stadium; Referee: Mohamed Lamine Chaoubi

23 January 2024 Round 11	JS Kabylie	0–0	MC El Bayadh	Tizi Ouzou
17:00		Report		Stadium: 1 November 1954 Stadium; Referee: Rafik Aouina

27 January 2024 Round 15	ES Ben Aknoun	1–1	MC El Bayadh	Belouizdad
15:30	Hadji 1'	Report	Hitala 90+2'	Stadium: 20 August 1955 Stadium; Referee: Ayoub Belhachemi

4 February 2024 Round 12	MC El Bayadh	2–1	CR Belouizdad	El Bayadh
15:00	Messadi 11'; Belmiloud 44'	Report	Darfalou 70'	Stadium: Zakaria Medjdoub Stadium; Referee: Alaa Bouab

10 February 2024 Round 16	CS Constantine	2–1	MC El Bayadh	Constantine
16:00	Dib 48' (pen.); Benmessabih 90'	Report	Bounaama 24'	Stadium: Chahid Hamlaoui Stadium; Referee: Abderahmane Sahraoui

15 February 2024 Round 17	MC El Bayadh	3–0	ES Sétif	El Bayadh
15:30	Belmiloud 10'; Belaribi 27'; Ghenam 84' (pen.)	Report		Stadium: Zakaria Medjdoub Stadium; Referee: Yahia Dahar

24 February 2024 Round 18	MC El Bayadh	0–0	MC Alger	El Bayadh
16:00		Report		Stadium: Zakaria Medjdoub Stadium; Referee: Youcef Gamouh

2 March 2024 Round 19	ASO Chlef	2–1	MC El Bayadh	Chlef
16:45	Agbagno 31'; Bourdim 48' (pen.)	Report	Serraoui 90+8' (pen.)	Stadium: Mohamed Boumezrag Stadium; Referee: Mehadji Tayeb Bouderbal

16 March 2024 Round 20	MC El Bayadh	0–1	JS Saoura	El Bayadh
15:30		Report	Saâd 80'	Stadium: Zakaria Medjdoub Stadium; Referee: Houssam Benyahia

23 March 2024 Round 21	US Souf	4–5	MC El Bayadh	El Oued
15:30	Hadj Saad 51', 80', 83'; Belkhadem 71'	Report	Lalaouna 1' (o.g.); Messadi 22', 43'; Sediri 25'; Belmiloud 40'	Stadium: 1 November 1954 Stadium; Referee: Anes Azrine

5 April 2024 Round 22	MC El Bayadh	0–2	NC Magra	El Bayadh
15:45		Report	Demane 74'; Moussaoui 90+6'	Stadium: Zakaria Medjdoub Stadium; Referee: Mohamed Saidi

20 April 2024 Round 23	Paradou AC	1–0	MC El Bayadh	Dar El Beïda
16:00	Boukerma 42'	Report		Stadium: Omar Benrabah Stadium; Referee: Fateh Harkat

26 April 2024 Round 24	MC El Bayadh	1–0	USM Khenchela	El Bayadh
16:00	Benzid 21'	Report		Stadium: Zakaria Medjdoub Stadium; Referee: Fodil Oukil

10 May 2024 Round 25	USM Alger	2–1	MC El Bayadh	Algiers
17:00	Belkacemi 19' (pen.), 45+3'	Report	Belmiloud 28' (pen.)	Stadium: Stade du 5 Juillet; Referee: Ayoub Belhachemi

17 May 2024 Round 26	MC El Bayadh	1–1	JS Kabylie	El Bayadh
17:00	Berriah 76'	Report	Maâmeri 90+6'	Stadium: Zakaria Medjdoub Stadium; Referee: Youcef Gamouh

26 May 2024 Round 27	CR Belouizdad	1–0	MC El Bayadh	Belouizdad
16:45	Hadded 73'	Report		Stadium: 20 August 1955 Stadium; Referee: Alaa Bouab

7 June 2024 Round 28	MC El Bayadh	2–1	US Biskra	El Bayadh
16:45	Serraoui 45+2' (pen.); Mellal 79'	Report	Tamer 70'	Stadium: Zakaria Medjdoub Stadium; Referee: Said Aouina

11 June 2024 Round 29	MC Oran	2–0	MC El Bayadh	Oran
16:45	Baakoh 19'; Benamara 80'	Report		Stadium: Ahmed Zabana Stadium; Referee: Redouane Allou

14 June 2024 Round 30	MC El Bayadh	1–0	ES Ben Aknoun	El Bayadh
16:45	Belmiloud 29'	Report		Stadium: Zakaria Medjdoub Stadium; Referee: Mustapha Ghorbal

=== Algerian Cup ===
19 February 2024 Round of 64	MC El Bayadh	1–1 (a.e.t.) (3–5 p)	SC Mécheria	El Bayadh
14:00	Sediri 1'	Report	Kebli 18'	Stadium: Zakaria Medjdoub Stadium; Referee: Lotfi Bekouassa
Note: MC El Bayadh Lineups: Naili, Bahoussi, Barka, Bounaama (substituted off) 90' (Khemaissia (substituted on) 90'), Amaouche, Abbes, Benzid, Belghoul (substituted off) 68' (Antar (substituted on) 90'), Tennah (substituted off) 46' (Belaribi (substituted on) 90'), Sediri (substituted off) 68' (Belmiloud (substituted on) 90'), Ghenam (substituted off) 46' (Messadi (substituted on) 90').

== Squad information ==
=== Playing statistics ===
No.	Pos	Nat	Player	Total		Ligue 1		Algerian Cup	
No.	Pos	Nat	Player	Apps	Goals	Apps	Goals	Apps	Goals
Goalkeepers
1	DF	(Algeria) ALG	Abdelkader Morcely	28	0	28	0	0	0
16	GK	(Algeria) ALG	Abdeselem Naili	2	0	1	0	1	0
30	GK	(Algeria) ALG	Ali Hamzaoui	0	0	0	0	0	0
Defenders
2	DF	(Algeria) ALG	Abdeldjalil Bahoussi	25	0	24	0	1	0
5	DF	(Algeria) ALG	Mohamed El Amine Barka	29	1	28	1	1	0
12	DF	(Algeria) ALG	Anis Khemaissia	25	0	24	0	1	0
13	DF	(Algeria) ALG	Abdessamad Bounaama	3	1	2	1	1	0
14	DF	(Algeria) ALG	Adel Amaouche	24	0	23	0	1	0
15	DF	(Algeria) ALG	Azzedine Berriah	26	2	26	2	0	0
21	DF	(Algeria) ALG	Belaid Kouar	3	0	3	0	0	0
24	DF	(Algeria) ALG	Kheireddine Benamrane	8	0	8	0	0	0
26	DF	(Algeria) ALG	Aïssa Boudechicha	11	0	11	0	0	0
Midfielders
4	MF	(Algeria) ALG	Brahim Zouad	7	0	7	0	0	0
6	MF	(Algeria) ALG	Abdenour Abbes	24	0	23	0	1	0
8	MF	(Algeria) ALG	El Amine Antar	11	0	10	0	1	0
9	MF	(Algeria) ALG	Ramzi Tennah	4	0	3	0	1	0
17	MF	(Algeria) ALG	Benamar Mellal	15	1	15	1	0	0
18	MF	(Algeria) ALG	Djamel Belalem	25	0	25	0	0	0
22	MF	(Algeria) ALG	Nacer Benzid	22	1	21	1	1	0
23	MF	(Algeria) ALG	Abdellah El Moudene	8	0	8	0	0	0
25	MF	(Algeria) ALG	Youcef Serraoui	21	2	21	2	0	0
33	MF	(Algeria) ALG	Mohamed Belghoul	3	0	2	0	1	0
Forwards
3	FW	(Algeria) ALG	Ahmed Ghenam	19	3	18	3	1	0
7	FW	(Algeria) ALG	Yasser Belaribi	26	2	25	2	1	0
10	FW	(Algeria) ALG	M'hend Sediri	12	2	11	1	1	1
11	FW	(Algeria) ALG	Mohammed Brahimi	17	0	17	0	0	0
19	FW	(Algeria) ALG	Abdelillah Barkat	18	0	18	0	0	0
20	FW	(Algeria) ALG	Ibrahim Morsli	4	0	4	0	0	0
27	FW	(Algeria) ALG	Kamel Belmiloud	31	8	30	8	1	0
29	FW	(Algeria) ALG	Mohamed Messadi	10	3	9	3	1	0
Players transferred out during the season
16	GK	(Algeria) ALG	Zakaria Bouziani	2	0	2	0	0	0
9	FW	(Algeria) ALG	Ramdane Hitala	11	3	11	3	0	0
20	FW	(Algeria) ALG	Oussama Aggar	0	0	0	0	0	0

Last updated: 14 June 2024
Source: soccerway.com

=== Goalscorers ===
As of 14 June 2024

Includes all competitive matches. The list is sorted alphabetically by surname when total goals are equal.

No.	Nat.	Player	Pos.	L 1	AC	TOTAL
27	(Algeria)	Kamel Belmiloud	FW	8	0	8
3	(Algeria)	Ahmed Ghenam	FW	3	0	3
29	(Algeria)	Mohamed Messadi	FW	3	0	3
9	(Algeria)	Ramdane Hitala	FW	3	0	3
7	(Algeria)	Yasser Belaribi	FW	2	0	2
10	(Algeria)	M'hend Sediri	FW	1	1	2
25	(Algeria)	Youcef Serraoui	MF	2	0	2
15	(Algeria)	Azzedine Berriah	DF	1	0	1
5	(Algeria)	Mohamed El Amine Barka	DF	1	0	1
13	(Algeria)	Abdessamad Bounaama	DF	1	0	1
14	(Algeria)	Adel Amaouche	DF	1	0	1
22	(Algeria)	Nacer Benzid	MF	1	0	1
15	(Algeria)	Azzedine Berriah	DF	1	0	1
17	(Algeria)	Benamar Mellal	MF	1	0	1
Own Goals				0	0	0
Totals				29	1	30
