= Hanaby Sagné =

Burkinabé footballer (born 2000)

Personal information
- Full name: Hanaby Hadalou Sagné
- Date of birth: 20 December 2000 (age 25)
- Place of birth: Watinoma, Burkina Faso
- Height: 1.70 m (5 ft 7 in)
- Position: Centre-back

Youth career
- AS Léopards de Saint-Camille

Senior career*
Years	Team	Apps	(Gls)
2018–2019	AS Léopards de Saint-Camille	0	(0)
2019–	AS Douanes Ouagadougou	165	(12)

International career^{‡}
2024–	Burkina Faso	6	(2)
- * Club domestic league appearances and goals as of 10:35, 10 March 2026 (UTC) ‡ National team caps and goals as of 20:24, 9 March 2025 (UTC)

Hanaby Hadalou Sagné (born 20 December 2000) is a Burkinabé professional footballer who plays as a centre-back for Burkinabé Premier League club AS Douanes Ouagadougou and the Burkina Faso national team.

== Club career ==
Sagné began his career at Burkinabé Championnat National Deuxième Division club AS Léopards de Saint-Camille in 2018 without making any appearances. He then joined Burkinabé Premier League club AS Douanes Ouagadougou in July 2019. He debuted on 19 August 2019 during the 0–0 draw against Étoile Filante de Ouagadougou, and he scored his first goal for the club on 7 December 2019 during the 1–1 draw against ASEC Koudougou.

He won the 2021–22 Coupe de Faso before winning consecutive Burkinabé Premier League titles with the club in 2022–23 and 2023–24 and the Burkinabé SuperCup in 2022 and 2023.

== International career ==
Sagné debuted for Burkina Faso during 2024 African Nations Championship qualification on 22 December 2024 against Ivory Coast.

He was called up again to the Burkina Faso national team for the Mapinduzi Cup in January 2025. He scored his first goal for Burkina Faso at the tournament during the 1–0 victory against Zanzibar on 6 January 2025. He then played two matches at the 2024 African Nations Championship.

== Career statistics ==
=== Club ===
As of match played 28 February 2026

Appearances and goals by club, season and competition
Club	Season	League			Coupe du Faso		Africa		Burkinabé SuperCup		Total	
Club	Season	Division	Apps	Goals	Apps	Goals	Apps	Goals	Apps	Goals	Apps	Goals
AS Léopards de Saint-Camille	2018–19	Burkinabé Championnat National Deuxième Division	0	0	0	0	—		—		0	0
AS Douanes Ouagadougou	2019–20	Burkinabé Premier League	12	1	0	0	—		—		12	1
AS Douanes Ouagadougou	2020–21	Burkinabé Premier League	30	3	1	1	—		—		31	4
AS Douanes Ouagadougou	2021–22	Burkinabé Premier League	30	2	4	0	—		—		34	2
AS Douanes Ouagadougou	2022–23	Burkinabé Premier League	26	2	5	0	—		1	0	32	2
AS Douanes Ouagadougou	2023–24	Burkinabé Premier League	28	1	3	0	—		1	0	32	1
AS Douanes Ouagadougou	2024–25	Burkinabé Premier League	25	1	2	0	2 (Note: Appearances in CAF Champions League)	0	—		29	1
AS Douanes Ouagadougou	2025–26	Burkinabé Premier League	14	2	2	0	—		—		16	2
Career total			165	12	17	1	2	0	2	0	187	13

=== International ===
As of match played 16 August 2025

Appearances and goals by national team and year
National team	Year	Apps	Goals
Burkina Faso	2024	2	0
Burkina Faso	2025	4	1
Total		6	1

Scores and results list Burkina Faso's goal tally first.

No.	Date	Venue	Cap	Opponent	Score	Result	Competition	Ref.
1.	6 January 2025	Gombani Stadium, Zanzibar	3	Zanzibar	1–0	1–0	2025 Mapinduzi Cup	

== Honours ==
AS Douanes Ouagadougou

- Burkinabé Premier League: 2022–23, 2023–24; runner-up 2020–21, 2024–25
- Coupe du Faso: 2021–22
- Burkinabé SuperCup: 2022, 2023

Burkina Faso

- Mapinduzi Cup: runner-up 2025
