= 2024–25 Algerian Ligue Professionnelle 1 =

Algerian Ligue Professionnelle 1
- Season: 2024–25
- Dates: 19 September 2024 – 21 June 2025
- Champions: MC Alger
- Relegated: NC Magra; US Biskra
- Champions League: MC Alger; JS Kabylie
- Confederation Cup: CR Belouizdad; USM Alger
- Matches: 240
- Goals: 467 (1.95 per match)
- Top goalscorer: Adil Boulbina (20 goals)
- Longest winning run: CR Belouizdad (5 matches)
- Longest unbeaten run: MC Alger (11 matches)
- Longest winless run: US Biskra (13 matches)
- Longest losing run: US Biskra (6 matches)
- All statistics correct as of 21 June 2025.

The 2024–25 Algerian Ligue Professionnelle 1 is the 63rd season of the Algerian Ligue Professionnelle 1 since its establishment in 1962. A total of 16 teams contest the league. On June 27, 2024 The federal office approved the calendar for the 2024–25 Ligue 1 season with the aim of ending on May 31, 2025. The first round is scheduled for September 14, this delay is motivated both by an extended end of the 2023–24 season but also by the holding of early presidential elections which will take place on September 7, 2024. However, the Ligue de Football Professionnel decided to postpone the start of the Ligue 1 by a week, on September 21. However, the first match was actually played on September 19.

The Algerian Ligue Professionnelle 1 will see the introduction of Video assistant referee this season. VAR will be used from the first round of the Ligue 1. The VAR will not be able to be used for all matches because several stadiums do not meet standards, making it impossible to install the necessary equipment. The FAF received the first fully equipped stations, in accordance with an agreement duly signed with the Portuguese company Medialuso, following a call for tenders for a rental. The rest of the equipment should be received. In addition to the equipment, the Portuguese company has also sent five technicians who will be responsible for the operation and maintenance of the devices.

== Teams ==
A total of sixteen teams are participating in the 2024–25 edition of the Ligue Professionnelle 1. ES Mostaganem return to the top flight after 25 year's absence and Olympique Akbou is promoted for the first time. Both teams after finishing first on their groups in the 2023–24 Algerian Ligue 2. ES Ben Aknoun and US Souf were relegated to 2024–25 Ligue 2 after one year in the top flight for both.

=== Changes ===
▲ from 2023–24 Algerian Ligue 2	▼ to 2024–25 Algerian Ligue 2
ES Mostaganem; Olympique Akbou	ES Ben Aknoun; US Souf

=== Stadiums and locations ===
Location of teams in 2024–25 Ligue Professionnelle 1
Algiers Province clubs

Club	Location	Venue	Capacity
ASO Chlef	Chlef	Mohamed Boumezrag Stadium	18,000
CR Belouizdad	Algiers	Stade du 5 Juillet	64,000
CS Constantine	Constantine	Chahid Hamlaoui Stadium	22,968
ES Mostaganem	Mostaganem	Mohamed Bensaïd Stadium	18,000
ES Sétif	Sétif	8 May 1945 Stadium	25,000
JS Kabylie	Tizi Ouzou	Hocine Aït Ahmed Stadium	50,766
JS Saoura	Béchar	20 August 1955 Stadium	20,000
MC Alger	Algiers	Ali La Pointe Stadium	40,000
MC El Bayadh	El Bayadh	Zakaria Medjdoub Stadium	15,000
MC Oran	Oran	Miloud Hadefi Stadium	40,143
NC Magra	Magra	Boucheligue Brothers Stadium	8,000
Olympique Akbou	Akbou	Maghrebi Unity Stadium	17,500
Paradou AC	Algiers	Stade du 5 Juillet	64,000
US Biskra	Biskra	18 February Stadium	24,000
USM Alger	Algiers	Stade du 5 Juillet	64,000
USM Khenchela	Khenchela	Amar Hamam Stadium	8,000

=== Personnel and kits ===
Team	Chairman	Manager	Captain	Kit manufacturer	Shorts sponsor
ASO Chlef	(Algeria) Mohamed Ouahab	(Algeria) Chérif Hadjar	(Algeria) Abdelkader Boussaid	Puma	
CR Belouizdad	(Algeria) Mehdi Rabehi	(France) Corentin Martins	(Algeria) Chouaib Keddad	Puma	
CS Constantine	(Algeria) Tarek Arama	(Algeria) Abdelkader Amrani	(Algeria) Brahim Dib	KSC	
ES Mostaganem	(Algeria) Taqi Al-Din Bibi	(Algeria) Reda Bendriss	(Algeria) Youcef Zahzouh	Macron	
ES Sétif	(Algeria) Abdelhamid Rais	(Tunisia) Ammar Souayah	(Algeria) Drice Chaabi	Macron	
JS Kabylie	(Algeria) El Hadi Ould Ali	(Algeria) Abdelkader Bahloul	(Algeria) Kouceila Boualia	Kappa	
JS Saoura	(Algeria) Mamoune Hamlili	(Algeria) Fouad Bouali	(Algeria) Adel Bouchiba	Umbro	
MC Alger	(Algeria) Mohamed Hakim Hadj Redjem	(France) Patrice Beaumelle	(Algeria) Ayoub Abdellaoui	Puma	
MC El Bayadh	(Algeria) Abdelkader Dahmani	(Algeria) Abdelhaq Belaid	(Algeria) Belaid Kouar	Macron	
MC Oran	(Algeria) Chakib Boumediene Ghomari	(Mali) Éric Chelle	(Algeria) Merouane Dahar	Macron	
NC Magra	(Algeria) Azzedine Bennacer	(Algeria) Lyamine Bougherara	(Algeria) Mohammed Bourahla	Macron	
Olympique Akbou	(Algeria) Karim Takka	(Algeria) Mounir Zeghdoud	(Algeria) Zidane Mebarakou	Erima	
Paradou AC	(Algeria) Kheiredine Zetchi	(Algeria) Abdelkarim Saber Cherif	(Algeria) Toufik Moussaoui	14Fourteen	
US Biskra	(Algeria) Abdelkader Triaa	(Algeria) Tahar Chérif El-Ouazzani	(Algeria) Nacereddine Khoualed	Puma	
USM Alger	(Algeria) Athmane Sehbane	(Tunisia) Nabil Maâloul	(Algeria) Saâdi Radouani	Macron	
USM Khenchela	(Algeria) Walid Boukrouma	(Algeria) Moufdi Cherdoud	(Algeria) Abdelhakim Sameur	Hummel	

=== Managerial changes ===
Team	Outgoing manager	Manner of departure	Date of vacancy	Position in table	Incoming manager	Date of appointment
USM Alger	(Spain) Juan Carlos Garrido	End of contract	14 June 2024	Pre-season	(Tunisia) Nabil Maâloul	13 July 2024
ASO Chlef	(Algeria) Chérif Hadjar	End of contract	14 June 2024	Pre-season	(Algeria) Samir Zaoui	15 July 2024
CR Belouizdad	(Brazil) Marcos Paquetá	End of contract	6 July 2024	Pre-season	(France) Corentin Martins	16 July 2024
CS Constantine	(Algeria) Abdelkader Amrani	End of contract	29 June 2024	Pre-season	(Algeria) Kheïreddine Madoui	19 July 2024
JS Kabylie	(Algeria) Abdelkader Bahloul	End of contract	15 June 2024	Pre-season	(Algeria) Abdelhak Benchikha	30 June 2024
Paradou AC	(Algeria) Abdelkarim Saber Cherif	End of contract	15 June 2024	Pre-season	(Tunisia) Radhi Jaïdi	15 July 2024
USM Khenchela	(Algeria) Moufdi Cherdoud	End of contract	15 June 2024	Pre-season	(Tunisia) Hatem Missaoui	4 August 2024
ES Sétif	(Tunisia) Ammar Souayah	Mutual consent	9 July 2024	Pre-season	(Algeria) Rédha Bendris	10 July 2024
JS Saoura	(Algeria) Fouad Bouali	Sacked	15 June 2024	Pre-season	(Algeria) Tahar Chérif El-Ouazzani	25 July 2024
MC El Bayadh	(Algeria) Abdelhaq Belaid	Sacked	15 June 2024	Pre-season	(Algeria) Fouad Bouali	14 August 2024
Olympique Akbou	(Algeria) Mourad Karouf	End of contract	15 July 2024	Pre-season	(Tunisia) Moez Bouakaz	29 July 2024
ES Mostaganem	(Algeria) Rédha Bendris	End of contract	15 July 2024	Pre-season	(Algeria) Chérif Hadjar	1 July 2024
JS Saoura	(Algeria) Tahar Chérif El-Ouazzani	Mutual consent	15 September 2024	15th	(Algeria) Moustapha Djallit	15 September 2024
JS Saoura	(Algeria) Moustapha Djallit	Caretaker manager	20 November 2024	10th	(Tunisia) Mourad Okbi	20 November 2024
MC Oran	(Algeria) Youcef Bouzidi	Sacked	5 October 2024	7th	(Mali) Éric Chelle	9 October 2024
CR Belouizdad	(France) Corentin Martins	Mutual consent	14 October 2024	13th	(Algeria) Abdelkader Amrani	16 October 2024
Paradou AC	(Tunisia) Radhi Jaïdi	Resigned	26 October 2024	15th	(Algeria) Billel Dziri	28 October 2024
USM Khenchela	(Tunisia) Hatem Missaoui	Sacked	30 October 2024	12th	(Algeria) Chérif Hadjar	11 November 2024
ES Mostaganem	(Algeria) Chérif Hadjar	Mutual consent	11 November 2024	9th	(Algeria) Slimane Raho	14 November 2024
MC El Bayadh	(Algeria) Fouad Bouali	Mutual consent	12 November 2024	15th	(Algeria) Lotfi Amrouche	14 November 2024
US Biskra	(Algeria) Mounir Zeghdoud	Mutual consent	19 November 2024	13th	(Algeria) Tahar Chérif El-Ouazzani	26 November 2024
Olympique Akbou	(Tunisia) Moez Bouakaz	Resigned	30 November 2024	6th	(Algeria) Mounir Zeghdoud	3 December 2024
MC Alger	(France) Patrice Beaumelle	Mutual consent	16 December 2024	6th	(Tunisia) Khaled Ben Yahia	17 December 2024
ES Mostaganem	(Algeria) Slimane Raho	Resigned	26 December 2024	15th	(Algeria) Nadir Leknaoui	30 December 2024
NC Magra	(Algeria) Lyamine Bougherara	Mutual consent	27 December 2024	13th	(Algeria) Fouad Bouali	12 January 2025
JS Kabylie	(Algeria) Abdelhak Benchikha	Resigned	3 January 2025	1st	(Germany) Josef Zinnbauer	20 January 2025
Olympique Akbou	(Algeria) Mounir Zeghdoud	Sacked	5 January 2025	11th	(France) Denis Lavagne	10 January 2025
MC Oran	(Mali) Éric Chelle	Resigned	12 January 2025	10th	(Algeria) Abdelkader Amrani	6 February 2025
US Biskra	(Algeria) Tahar Chérif El-Ouazzani	Resigned	10 January 2025	15th	(Algeria) Lyamine Bougherara	14 January 2025
ES Sétif	(Algeria) Rédha Bendris	Sacked	21 January 2025	4th	(Tunisia) Nabil Kouki	21 January 2025
CR Belouizdad	(Algeria) Abdelkader Amrani	Resigned	24 January 2025	6th	(Germany) Sead Ramović	5 February 2025
USM Alger	(Tunisia) Nabil Maâloul	Sacked	12 February 2025	3rd	(Brazil) Marcos Paquetá	16 February 2025
USM Khenchela	(Algeria) Chérif Hadjar	Resigned	18 February 2025	13th	(Algeria) Hocine Achiou	13 April 2025
NC Magra	(Algeria) Fouad Bouali	Resigned	20 March 2025	16th	(Algeria) Abdelaziz Abbès	24 March 2025
Olympique Akbou	(France) Denis Lavagne	Sacked	27 March 2025	12th	(Algeria) Yacine Ouzani	27 March 2025
JS Saoura	(Tunisia) Mourad Okbi	Resigned	11 April 2025	9th	(Algeria) Moustapha Djallit	11 April 2025
USM Alger	(Brazil) Marcos Paquetá	Sacked	28 April 2025	8th	(Algeria) Mohamed Lacet	5 May 2025
US Biskra	(Algeria) Lyamine Bougherara	Resigned	16 May 2025	16th		

=== Foreign players ===
Following urgent requests from certain clubs, the Algerian Football Federation has decided to increase the number of foreign players in the Ligue 1. After having formally passed through the technical college chaired by Rabah Saâdane, the FAF ratified the increase in the number of foreigners per club from 3 to 5. However, that there is a provision intended to serve as a safeguard for the license of a foreign player or coach to be validated, the club must pay the federation a deposit equivalent to 12 months salary. This is to protect against any financial dispute.

Club	Player 1	Player 2	Player 3	Player 4	Player 5	Former player(s)
ASO Chlef	(Botswana) Gape Mohutsiwa	(Togo) Yawo Agbagno	(Niger) Ismael Mahamadou Moussa	(Liberia) Edward Ledlum	(Togo) Kokou Avotor	
CR Belouizdad	(Cameroon) Jacques Mbé	(Ivory Coast) Arafat Doumbia	(South Africa) Khanyisa Mayo			
CS Constantine	(Cameroon) Nkembe Enow	(Gabon) Axel Méyé	(Nigeria) Tosin Omoyele	(Senegal) Mélo Ndiaye	(Burkina Faso) Salifou Tapsoba	
ES Mostaganem	(Guinea) Fodé Camara	(Democratic Republic of the Congo) Ducapel Moloko				
ES Sétif	(Mali) Moriba Diarra	(Nigeria) Kingsley Eduwo	(Nigeria) Augustine Oladapo	(Benin) Rodrigue Kossi Fiogbé	(Burkina Faso) Clément Pitroipa	(Mali) Salam Jiddou
JS Kabylie	(Burkina Faso) Djibril Ouattara	(Democratic Republic of the Congo) Walter Bwalya	(Mali) Sadio Kanouté	(Senegal) Babacar Sarr	(Mali) Youssouf Koné	
JS Saoura	(Ivory Coast) Guy Stéphane Bédi					(Republic of the Congo) Carl Wunda
MC Alger	(Ivory Coast) Mohamed Zougrana	(Ivory Coast) Romaric Ouattara	(Ivory Coast) Kipre Junior	(Ivory Coast) Serge Badjo	(Guinea) Mohamed Saliou Bangoura	
MC El Bayadh						
MC Oran	(Ghana) Maxwell Baakoh	(Ivory Coast) Mohamed Sylla	(The Gambia) Pa Omar Jobe	(Mauritania) Sid'Ahmed Ablla		(Ivory Coast) Sery Gnoleba
NC Magra	(Mali) Salam Jiddou					
Olympique Akbou						
Paradou AC	(Republic of the Congo) Christ Toulouenga	(Libya) Tahir Bin Amir				
US Biskra	(Republic of the Congo) Pomi Nzaou	(Republic of the Congo) Servyl Akouala	(Republic of the Congo) Djigo Saïkou			
USM Alger	(Democratic Republic of the Congo) Kévin Mondeko	(Democratic Republic of the Congo) Glody Likonza	(Bolivia) Adalid Terrazas	(Nigeria) Wale Musa Alli	(Burundi) Bonfils-Caleb Bimenyimana	(Senegal) Sekou Gassama
USM Khenchela	(Benin) Irenée Togbedji Glele	(Ivory Coast) Moise Gbai	(Republic of the Congo) Prince Ibara	(Democratic Republic of the Congo) Dago Tshibamba		

== League table ==
Pos	Team	Pld	W	D	L	GF	GA	GD	Pts	Qualification or relegation
1	MC Alger (C)	30	15	13	2	39	19	+20	58	Qualification for CAF Champions League
2	JS Kabylie	30	16	8	6	42	27	+15	56	Qualification for CAF Champions League
3	CR Belouizdad	30	15	10	5	44	21	+23	55	Qualification for Confederation Cup (Note: USMA Alger qualified for the 2025–26 CAF Confederation Cup by winning the 2024–25 Algerian Cup)
4	JS Saoura	30	12	7	11	34	36	−2	43	
5	Paradou AC	30	11	8	11	41	39	+2	41	
6	ES Sétif	30	11	8	11	21	24	−3	41	
7	USM Alger	30	10	10	10	26	26	0	40	Qualification for Confederation Cup
8	MC Oran	30	12	4	14	32	33	−1	40	
9	USM Khenchela	30	11	7	12	28	38	−10	40	
10	CS Constantine	30	9	12	9	31	31	0	39	
11	Olympique Akbou	30	9	10	11	24	23	+1	37	
12	MC El Bayadh	30	9	9	12	23	26	−3	36	
13	ASO Chlef	30	7	13	10	24	27	−3	34	
14	ES Mostaganem	30	8	10	12	23	31	−8	34	
15	NC Magra (R)	30	7	10	13	23	35	−12	31	Relegation to Algerian Ligue 2
16	US Biskra (R)	30	3	11	16	12	31	−19	20	Relegation to Algerian Ligue 2

Source: the-sports.org
Rules for classification: 1) points; 2) head-to-head points; 3) head-to-head goal difference; 4) goal difference; 5) total goals; 6) fairplay ranking; 7) playoff.
(C) Champions; (R) Relegated

== Results ==
Home \ Away	ASO	CRB	CSC	ESM	ESS	JSK	JSS	MCA	MCEB	MCO	NCM	OA	PAC	USB	USMA	USMK
ASO Chlef		1–1	0–0	2–0	0–1	1–0	1–2	0–0	2–0	1–0	2–2	0–0	2–0	1–1	0–0	1–1
CR Belouizdad	2–0		0–2	3–2	0–0	1–1	3–0	1–1	2–3	2–0	4–0	1–0	2–1	2–0	1–1	3–0
CS Constantine	2–2	0–2		0–0	2–1	1–1	2–2	0–0	0–1	2–2	0–0	2–1	2–1	3–0	1–0	2–1
ES Mostaganem	1–0	0–2	0–0		1–0	0–0	1–1	1–1	0–0	2–1	2–1	1–1	0–2	1–0	0–1	2–0
ES Sétif	1–0	1–0	0–1	1–0		2–2	1–0	0–0	1–0	1–0	0–0	1–0	1–2	1–0	1–1	0–1
JS Kabylie	1–0	3–2	2–3	2–1	2–0		1–2	1–2	3–0	2–1	2–1	2–1	2–1	0–0	0–0	1–0
JS Saoura	1–1	1–3	2–0	0–0	3–2	1–1		0–0	1–0	2–0	1–0	2–1	3–2	2–0	2–1	1–1
MC Alger	0–0	1–3	2–1	5–2	4–1	3–2	2–0		0–0	1–0	0–0	0–0	1–1	0–0	1–0	2–2
MC El Bayadh	2–1	0–0	1–1	1–1	1–0	1–2	1–0	0–1		1–0	4–0	0–1	1–1	0–1	2–1	1–2
MC Oran	0–0	1–2	1–0	1–0	1–0	2–0	2–0	0–2	3–2		2–1	1–0	2–0	1–0	4–0	0–0
NC Magra	2–0	1–0	2–1	1–0	0–0	1–3	2–0	1–2	0–0	2–1		1–1	1–1	2–2	0–0	2–0
Olympique Akbou	0–0	0–0	0–0	1–2	0–1	0–0	2–1	1–0	0–1	3–1	1–0		1–2	2–0	0–0	2–1
Paradou AC	2–0	1–2	2–0	1–3	0–0	0–3	2–0	1–3	0–0	2–2	2–0	1–3		2–1	3–1	4–0
US Biskra	1–2	0–0	1–1	0–0	0–0	0–1	2–1	0–1	0–0	0–2	1–0	0–1	0–1		0–0	1–2
USM Alger	1–2	0–0	2–1	1–0	1–0	0–1	2–0	0–3	1–0	3–0	2–0	1–1	1–1	2–1		3–0
USM Khenchela	3–2	0–0	1–0	2–0	2–3	0–1	1–3	0–1	1–0	2–1	1–0	1–0	2–2	0–0	1–0	

Updated to match(es) played on 21 June 2025. Source: [www.flashscore.co.uk/standings/WbF6WhqI/6HlIScub/#/6HlIScub/live]
Legend: Blue = home team win; Yellow = draw; Red = away team win.

== Clubs season-progress ==
Team ╲ Round	1	2	3	4	5	6	7	8	9	10	11	12	13	14	15	16	17	18	19	20	21	22	23	24	25	26	27	28	29	30
ASO Chlef	L	D	D	D	D	D	L	W	W	D	L	W	D	D	W	W	D	W	L	D	W	L	L	D	L	D	L	L	D	L
CR Belouizdad	D	D	D	L	D	L	W	W	D	W	W	W	L	W	W	W	L	W	D	D	W	W	W	L	D	D	W	W	W	D
CS Constantine	D	D	D	W	W	W	L	W	L	W	D	L	W	D	L	D	D	L	D	L	W	D	D	W	L	W	D	L	L	D
ES Mostaganem	D	W	L	L	L	W	W	L	L	D	D	L	D	L	L	D	L	W	L	W	D	D	L	W	D	D	W	L	D	W
ES Sétif	W	D	D	L	W	L	W	L	L	W	D	W	D	D	D	L	W	D	W	L	L	W	W	D	W	L	L	L	L	W
JS Kabylie	L	W	W	L	L	W	W	D	D	W	D	W	D	W	L	L	D	W	D	W	W	D	W	W	W	L	W	W	D	W
JS Saoura	L	D	L	W	L	W	L	W	L	D	D	L	D	L	W	W	W	W	L	W	L	L	L	W	D	W	D	W	W	D
MC Alger	W	D	D	W	W	D	W	D	W	L	D	W	D	D	W	W	W	W	W	D	L	W	W	D	D	W	D	W	D	D
MC El Bayadh	L	L	L	W	W	L	D	L	L	L	D	W	W	W	L	W	D	W	D	D	W	D	W	D	L	D	D	L	L	L
MC Oran	W	L	D	L	W	D	W	W	L	D	L	W	L	L	L	L	W	L	L	L	W	D	L	W	L	W	W	W	L	W
NC Magra	L	D	D	D	L	W	L	L	W	D	W	L	D	D	L	D	L	D	L	D	L	W	W	L	W	L	L	L	W	D
Olympique Akbou	W	L	W	W	D	D	L	L	W	L	L	D	W	L	L	D	D	L	L	D	W	D	D	L	L	W	D	W	W	D
Paradou AC	W	D	L	L	L	D	D	W	W	W	D	L	D	W	W	L	L	L	W	W	L	D	D	D	W	W	L	W	L	L
US Biskra	L	W	D	D	W	L	L	D	L	L	D	L	L	D	D	D	D	L	W	L	D	D	L	D	L	L	L	L	L	L
USM Alger	W	D	W	W	D	D	L	D	W	L	D	D	W	D	W	D	W	L	W	D	L	L	L	L	W	L	D	L	W	L
USM Khenchela	D	D	W	D	L	L	W	L	W	D	W	L	L	D	W	L	L	L	W	D	L	L	D	L	W	L	W	W	W	W

Updated to match(es) played on 21 June 2025. Source: the-sports.org
W = Win; D = Draw; L = Lose

== Positions by round ==
Team ╲ Round	1	2	3	4	5	6	7	8	9	10	11	12	13	14	15	16	17	18	19	20	21	22	23	24	25	26	27	28	29	30
ASO Chlef	16	15	14	16	12	14	16	14	10	11	12	11	10	10	8	7	6	5	6	6	5	5	7	8	9	10	11	13	13	13
CR Belouizdad	7	11	12	13	11	16	12	8	9	7	4	3	5	3	2	2	2	2	2	2	2	2	2	2	3	3	3	3	2	3
CS Constantine	8	11	11	6	4	1	3	2	3	2	2	4	3	4	6	5	5	6	8	9	7	8	9	5	7	6	5	6	7	10
ES Mostaganem	9	3	10	11	14	10	8	9	12	12	13	13	14	14	15	15	16	15	16	14	14	14	15	13	15	14	14	14	14	14
ES Sétif	6	5	6	8	6	8	7	7	11	9	9	6	6	7	7	8	7	7	5	7	9	6	4	4	4	5	6	7	8	6
JS Kabylie	14	7	2	4	10	5	2	4	5	3	3	2	2	1	4	4	4	4	4	4	3	3	3	3	2	2	2	2	3	2
JS Saoura	15	14	15	10	13	9	13	10	13	13	14	14	15	15	13	12	9	8	10	8	10	10	10	10	10	9	9	5	4	4
MC Alger	3	2	5	3	1	2	1	1	1	1	1	1	1	2	1	1	1	1	1	1	1	1	1	1	1	1	1	1	1	1
MC El Bayadh	11	16	16	15	8	11	11	15	16	16	16	15	12	11	12	9	10	9	9	10	8	9	6	6	8	8	8	10	12	12
MC Oran	1	6	7	9	7	6	5	3	6	6	8	5	8	9	11	13	11	11	12	13	12	12	12	11	11	11	10	9	9	8
NC Magra	13	13	13	13	16	13	15	16	15	14	11	12	13	13	14	14	14	14	15	15	16	15	14	15	13	15	15	15	15	15
Olympique Akbou	5	8	3	2	3	4	6	6	4	8	10	10	7	8	10	11	12	12	13	12	11	11	11	12	14	12	13	12	11	11
Paradou AC	2	1	9	12	15	15	14	11	7	5	6	8	9	6	5	6	8	10	7	5	6	7	8	9	6	4	4	4	5	5
US Biskra	12	8	8	7	5	7	10	12	14	15	15	16	16	16	16	16	15	16	14	16	15	16	16	16	16	16	16	16	16	16
USM Alger	4	4	1	1	2	3	4	5	2	4	5	7	4	5	3	3	3	3	3	3	4	4	5	7	5	7	7	8	6	7
USM Khenchela	10	10	4	5	9	12	9	13	8	10	7	9	11	12	9	10	13	13	11	11	13	13	13	14	12	13	12	11	10	9

Leader
2025–26 CAF Champions League
2025–26 CAF Confederation Cup
Relegation to Algerian Ligue 2

Updated to match(es) played on 21 June 2025. Source: the-sports.org

== Season statistics ==
=== Top scorers ===
Rank	Goalscorer	Club	Goals
1	(Algeria) Adil Boulbina	Paradou AC	20
2	(Algeria) Aymen Mahious	CR Belouizdad	14
3	(Togo) Yawo Agbagno	ASO Chlef	10
3	(Algeria) Hamid Djaouchi	USM Khenchela	10
5	(Algeria) Redouane Berkane	JS Kabylie	8

Updated to games played on 21 June 2025.
Source: flashscore.com

=== Hat-tricks ===
Player	For	Against	Result	Date	Ref
(Algeria) Brahim Dib	CS Constantine	JS Kabylie*	2–3	12 October 2024	

== Attendances ==
No.	Club	Average attendance
1	MC Alger	40,742
2	JS Kabylie	31,158
3	USM Alger	18,512
4	MC Oran	12,832
5	CR Belouizdad	12,486
6	ES Sétif	6,203
7	JS Saoura	5,732
8	CS Constantine	4,752
9	USM Khenchela	3,298
10	Paradou AC	3,012
11	Olympique Akbou	2,621
12	ASO Chlef	2,134
13	MC El-Bayadh	1,987
14	ES Mostaganem	1,876
15	NC Magra	1,432
16	US Biskra	1,103

== See also ==
- 2024–25 Algerian Ligue 2
- 2024–25 Algerian Cup
- 2024 Algerian Super Cup
- 2024-25 CAF Champions League
- 2024-25 CAF Confederation Cup
