= List of football stadiums in Burkina Faso =

The following is a list of football stadiums in Burkina Faso, ranked by seating capacity. Stadiums in Burkina Faso with a capacity of 5,000 or more are included, even though the list is incomplete.

== Current stadiums ==
Image	Stadium	Capacity	City	Home team	Sport
	Statde Municipal	50,000	Bobo Dioulasso	National football team	Football
	Stade du 4-Août	29,800	Ouagadougou	National football team	Football
	Stade Balibiè	5,000	Koudougou	National football team	Football

== See also ==
- Lists of stadiums
