= Clément Pitroipa =

Burkinabé footballer (born 1998)

Personal information
- Date of birth: 23 November 1998 (age 27)
- Place of birth: Ouagadougou, Burkina Faso
- Height: 1.76 m (5 ft 9 in)
- Position: Winger

Team information
- Current team: Maniema Union
- Number: 10

Senior career*
Years	Team	Apps	(Gls)
2017–2018	KOZAF		
2018–2021	US des Forces Armées	44+	(18)
2021–2022	ASEC Mimosas		
2022–2025	AS Douanes Ouagadougou	70	(10)
2025	ES Sétif	15	(0)
2025–	Maniema Union	2	(2)

International career
2021–	Burkina Faso	9	(2)
- * Club domestic league appearances and goals as of 6 March 2026

Clément Pitroipa (born 23 November 1998) is a Burkinabé footballer who plays as a winger for Linafoot club Maniema Union.

== Club career ==
Pitroipa began his career in Burkina Faso with KOZAF in 2017 before he made the move to US des Forces Armées on 1 August 2018. He then joined Ligue 1 (Ivory Coast) club ASEC Mimosas for the 2021–22 season before returning to Burkina Faso to join AS Douanes Ouagadougou on 10 August 2022.

He joined Algerian Ligue Professionnelle 1 club ES Sétif on 26 January 2025 on a deal valid until 2027, and he debuted on 6 February 2025 during the 1–0 victory against AE Eulma in the Algerian Cup round of 16. He left the club at the end of the 2024–25 season.

He joined Linafoot club Maniema Union on 14 August 2025. As a substitute, he scored two goals during the 3–2 victory against Étoile de Kivu on 22 February 2026.

== International career ==
Pitroipa made his debut for Burkina Faso on 16 January 2021 during the 1–0 loss against Mali at the 2020 African Nations Championship; he played all three matches as Burkina Faso were eliminated during the group stage. He then participated in 2025 Africa Cup of Nations qualification and 2024 African Nations Championship qualification.

He was called up to the Burkina Faso squad for the 2025 Mapinduzi Cup and he scored both goals against Tanzania in the group stage on 9 January 2025. He played in the final as Burkina Faso finished the tournament as runners-up. He became the joint top scorer of the tournament alongside his teammate Aboubacar Traoré.

== Career statistics ==
=== Club ===
As of match played 15 March 2026

Appearances and goals by club, season and competition
Club	Season	League			National cup (Note: Includes Coupe du Faso, Algerian Cup, Coupe du Congo (DR Congo))		Africa		Other		Total	
Club	Season	Division	Apps	Goals	Apps	Goals	Apps	Goals	Apps	Goals	Apps	Goals
KOZAF	2017–18	Burkinabé Championnat National Deuxième Division	?	?	?	?	—		—		?	?
US des Forces Armées	2018–19	Burkinabé Premier League	?	4	?	?	—		—		?	4+
US des Forces Armées	2019–20	Burkinabé Premier League	18	6	?	2	—		—		18+	8
US des Forces Armées	2020–21	Burkinabé Premier League	26	8	?	?	—		—		28+	6+
ASEC Mimosas	2021–22	Ligue 1 (Ivory Coast)	?	?	— (Note: The Coupe de Côte d'Ivoire was not held during the 2021–22 season.)		4 (Note: One appearance in CAF Champions League and three appearances in CAF Confederation Cup)	0	—		4+	0+
AS Douanes Ouagadougou	2022–23	Burkinabé Premier League	28	4	?	?	—		0	0	28+	4+
AS Douanes Ouagadougou	2023–24	Burkinabé Premier League	29	5	5	2	—		1 (Note: Appearance in Burkinabé SuperCup)	0	35	7
AS Douanes Ouagadougou	2024–25	Burkinabé Premier League	13	1	3	3	2 (Note: Appearances in CAF Champions League)	1	1	0	19	5
AS Douanes Ouagadougou	Total		107+	24+	8+	7+	10	2	2	0	127+	33+
ES Sétif	2024–25	Algerian Ligue Professionnelle 1	15	0	2	0	—		—		17	0
Maniema Union	2025–26	Linafoot	2	2	1	0/?	8 (Note: Appearances in CAF Confederation Cup)	0	—		11	2+
Maniema Union	Total		17	2	3	0/?	8	0	—		28	2+
Career total			124+	26+	11+	7+/?	11	2	2	0	148+	35+/?

=== International ===
As of match played 13 January 2025

Appearances and goals by national team and year
National team	Year	Apps	Goals
Burkina Faso	2021	3	0
Burkina Faso	2022	0	0
Burkina Faso	2023	0	0
Burkina Faso	2024	2	0
Burkina Faso	2025	4	2
Total		9	2

Scores and results list Burkina Faso's goal tally first, score column indicates score after each Pitroipa goal.

List of international goals scored by Clément Pitroipa
No.	Date	Venue	Cap	Opponent	Score	Result	Competition	Ref.
1.	9 January 2025	Gombani Stadium, Zanzibar	8	Tanzania	1–0	2–0	2025 Mapinduzi Cup	
2.	9 January 2025	Gombani Stadium, Zanzibar	8	Tanzania	2–0	2–0	2025 Mapinduzi Cup	

== Honours ==
US des Forces Armées

- Burkinabé Premier League: third place 2018–19

AS Douanes Ouagadougou

- Burkinabé Premier League: 2022–23, 2023–24; runner-up 2024–25
- Burkinabé SuperCup: 2022, 2023

ASEC Mimosas

- Ligue 1 (Ivory Coast): 2021–22

ES Sétif

- Algerian Cup: 2024–25

Burkina Faso

- Mapinduzi Cup: runner-up 2025
