= Aboubacar Traoré (footballer, born 1997) =

Burkinabe footballer

Personal information
- Date of birth: 31 January 1997 (age 29)
- Place of birth: Bobo-Dioulasso, Burkina Faso
- Height: 1.82 m (6 ft 0 in)
- Position: Centre forward

Senior career*
Years	Team	Apps	(Gls)
2017–2018	Bobo Sport		
2018–2020	Accra Hearts of Oak	9	(1)
2020–2021	RC Bobo Dioulasso	11	(1)
2021–2022	Sya Foot		
2022–2023	Bobo Sport		
2023–2025	AS SONABEL	41	(15)
2025	Maniema Union	3	
2026	Nchanga Rangers		

International career^{‡}
2024–	Burkina Faso	5	(3)
- * Club domestic league appearances and goals ‡ National team caps and goals as of 20:24, 9 March 2025 (UTC)

Aboubacar Traoré (born 31 January 1997) is a Burkinabé professional footballer who plays as a centre forward for the Burkina Faso national team.

== International career ==
Traoré debuted for Burkina Faso during 2024 African Nations Championship qualification on 22 December 2024 against Ivory Coast; he scored his first goal for Burkina Faso during the second leg.

He was called up again to the Burkina Faso national team for the Mapinduzi Cup in January 2025. During the tournament, he scored two goals including a goal during the final against Zanzibar. He became the joint top scorer of the tournament alongside his teammate Clément Pitroipa.

== Career statistics ==
=== International ===
As of match played 13 January 2025.

Appearances and goals by national team and year
National team	Year	Apps	Goals
Burkina Faso	2024	2	1
Burkina Faso	2025	3	2
Total		5	3

Scores and results list Burkina Faso's goal tally first.

No.	Date	Venue	Opponent	Score	Result	Competition
1.	28 December 2024	Stade du 26 Mars, Bamako, Mali	Ivory Coast	1–0	2–0 (4–2 p)	2024 African Nations Championship qualification
2.	4 January 2025	Gombani Stadium, Zanzibar	Kenya	1–1	1–1	2025 Mapinduzi Cup
3.	13 January 2025	Gombani Stadium, Zanzibar	Zanzibar	1–1	1–2	2025 Mapinduzi Cup

== Honours ==
Accra Hearts of Oak

- Ghana Football Association Normalization Committee Special Competition: third place 2019

AS SONABEL

- Burkinabé Premier League: runner-up 2024–25; third place 2023–24

Maniema Union

- Linafoot: runner-up 2024–25

Burkina Faso

- Mapinduzi Cup: runner-up 2025
