= Feisal Salum =

Tanzanian footballer

Personal information
- Full name: Feisal Salum Abdallah
- Date of birth: 11 January 1998 (age 28)
- Place of birth: Zanzibar
- Height: 1.78 m (5 ft 10 in)
- Position: Attacking midfielder

Team information
- Current team: Azam F.C.
- Number: 6

Senior career*
Years	Team	Apps	(Gls)
2016–2018	JKU		
2018–2022	Young Africans	26+	(32)
2023–	Azam F.C	54	(23)

International career^{‡}
2017–2025	Zanzibar	13	(1)
2018–	Tanzania	60	(5)
- * Club domestic league appearances and goals ‡ National team caps and goals as of 19:00, 30 December 2025 (UTC)

Feisal Salum Abdallah, commonly known as Fei Toto, (born 11 January 1998) is a Tanzanian professional footballer who plays as a Attacking midfielder for Tanzanian Premier League club Azam FC and the Tanzania national team. He is a technically gifted and creative offensive playmaker who could play as an attacking midfielder or Box-to-box midfielder or as Deep-lying playmaker.

== International ==
=== Zanzibar, Tanzania ===
Salum played at the 2017 CECAFA Cup with the Zanzibar national football team.

During the 2025 Mapinduzi Cup, Salum chose to represent Zanzibar instead of Tanzania Mainland. During the competition, he scored his first goal for Zanzibar during a 1–0 win against Tanzania Mainland on 3 January 2025.

=== Tanzania ===
Salum made his Tanzania national football team debut on 16 October 2018 in an AFCON qualifier against Cape Verde.

He was selected for Tanzania's Africa Cup of Nations squads in 2019, 2023 and 2025. On 30 December 2025, he scored in a 1–1 draw against Tunisia during the latter tournament, securing his nation's qualification for the knockout stages for the first time in their history as one of the best third-placed teams.

== Career statistics ==
=== International ===
As of match played 30 December 2025.

Appearances and goals by national team and year
National team	Year	Apps	Goals
Tanzania	2018	2	0
Tanzania	2019	3	1
Tanzania	2020	3	1
Tanzania	2021	13	1
Tanzania	2022	7	0
Tanzania	2023	3	0
Tanzania	2024	13	2
Tanzania	2024	13	2
Tanzania	2025	14	1
Tanzania	2026	1	0
Total		60	5
Zanzibar	2017	5	0
Zanzibar	2018	0	0
Zanzibar	2019	3	0
Zanzibar	2020	0	0
Zanzibar	2021	0	0
Zanzibar	2022	0	0
Zanzibar	2023	1	0
Zanzibar	2024	0	0
Zanzibar	2025	4	1
Total		13	1

Scores and results list Tanzania's goal tally first.

No.	Date	Venue	Cap	Opponent	Score	Result	Competition
1.	17 November 2020	Benjamin Mkapa National Stadium, Dar es Salaam, Tanzania	12	Tunisia	1–1	1–1	2021 Africa Cup of Nations qualification
2.	7 September 2021	Benjamin Mkapa National Stadium, Dar es Salaam, Tanzania	21	Madagascar	3–2	3–2	2022 FIFA World Cup qualification
3.	10 September 2024	Charles Konan Banny Stadium, Yamoussoukro, Ivory Coast	43	Guinea	1–1	2–1	2025 Africa Cup of Nations qualification
4.	16 November 2024	Stade des Martyrs, Kinshasa, DR Congo	46	Ethiopia	2–0	2–0	2025 Africa Cup of Nations qualification
5.	30 December 2025	Rabat Olympic Stadium, Rabat, Morocco	59	Tunisia	1–1	1–1	2025 Africa Cup of Nations

Scores and results list Zanzibar's goal tally first.

No.	Date	Venue	Cap	Opponent	Score	Result	Competition
1.	3 January 2025	Gombani Stadium, Zanzibar	10	Tanzania	1–0	1–0	2025 Mapinduzi Cup

== Honours ==
Zanzibar

- Mapinduzi Cup
  - Champions (1): 2025
