= James Kinyanjui =

Kenyan footballer

Personal information
- Full name: James Njeng'a Kinyanjui
- Date of birth: 8 August 1998 (age 28)
- Place of birth: Kenya
- Position: Left winger

Team information
- Current team: AFC Leopards
- Number: 26

Senior career*
Years	Team	Apps	(Gls)
2017–2019	Thika United	23	(2)
2019–2021	Mathare United	33	(2)
2021–2022	Wazito	27	(1)
2022–2024	Bandari	44	(5)
2024–2025	Kenya Commercial Bank	31	(5)
2025–	AFC Leopards	25	(2)

International career^{‡}
2025–	Kenya	4	(1)
- * Club domestic league appearances and goals as of 13 May 2026 ‡ National team caps and goals as of 13 May 2026

James Njeng'a Kinyanjui (born 8 August 1998) is a Kenyan professional footballer who plays as a left winger for Kenyan Premier League club AFC Leopards and the Kenya national team.

== Club career ==
He began his career with Kenyan Premier League clubs Thika United, Mathare United and Wazito FC, and he then joined Bandari on 23 July 2022.

He then joined KCB in July 2024 and in 2024–25 he scored five goals and registered fourteen assists.

He joined AFC Leopards on 6 September 2025 on a deal valid until 2027, and he debuted during the 2–2 draw against Posta Rangers on 4 October 2025. He scored two goals and provided five assists for the club in his first season.

== International career ==
Kinyanjui scored on his debut for Kenya at the 2025 Mapinduzi Cup during the 1–1 draw against Burkina Faso on 4 January 2025.

== Career statistics ==
=== Club ===
As of match played 13 May 2026

Appearances and goals by club, season and competition (incomplete)
Club	Season	League		
Club	Season	Division	Apps	Goals
Thika United	2017–18	Kenyan Premier League	2	0
Thika United	2018–19	Kenyan Premier League	21	2
Mathare United	2019–20	Kenyan Premier League	33	2
Mathare United	2020–21	Kenyan Premier League	3	0
Wazito	2021–22	Kenyan Premier League	27	1
Bandari	2022–23	Kenyan Premier League	23	2
Bandari	2023–24	Kenyan Premier League	21	3
Kenya Commercial Bank	2024–25	Kenyan Premier League	31	5
AFC Leopards	2025–26	Kenyan Premier League	25	2
Career total			186	17

=== International ===
As of match played 7 June 2025

Appearances and goals by national team and year
National team	Year	Apps	Goals
Kenya	2025	4	1
Total		4	1

Scores and results list Kenya's goal tally first.

No.	Date	Venue	Opponent	Score	Result	Competition	Ref.
1.	4 January 2025	Gombani Stadium, Zanzibar	Burkina Faso	1–0	1–1	2025 Mapinduzi Cup	
