= Islam Chahrour =

Algerian footballer (born 1990)

Personal information
- Full name: Islam Chahrour
- Date of birth: March 20, 1990 (age 36)
- Place of birth: Zeboudja, Algeria
- Height: 1.84 m (6 ft 0 in)
- Position: Defender

Team information
- Current team: CR Témouchent
- Number: 4

Senior career*
| Years | Team | Apps | (Gls) |
| 2011–2015 | JSM Chéraga | | |
| 2015–2018 | Paradou AC | 67 | (1) |
| 2018–2020 | CS Constantine | 41 | (1) |
| 2020–2021 | ASO Chlef | 16 | (0) |
| 2021–2022 | Al-Kholood | 35 | (0) |
| 2022–2023 | Muaither | 14 | (0) |
| 2023–2024 | Al-Sahel | | |
| 2024–2025 | MC El Bayadh | 23 | (3) |
| 2025–2026 | ES Ben Aknoun | 20 | (0) |
| 2026– | CR Témouchent | 0 | (0) |

International career^{‡}
| 2019– | Algeria | 2 | (0) |
- * Club domestic league appearances and goals as of 27 June 2025 ‡ National team caps and goals as of 1 November 2019

Islam Chahrour (born 20 March 1990) is an Algerian footballer who plays as a defender for CR Témouchent.

== Club career ==
Chahrour made his professional debut with Paradou AC in a 2–1 Algerian Ligue Professionnelle 1 loss to USM Alger on 26 August 2017.

On 20 July 2022, Chahrour joined Qatari club Muaither.

On 19 July 2023, Chahrour signed for Al-Sahel.

On 21 August 2023, he joined MC El Bayadh.

On 9 July 2026, he joined CR Témouchent.
