= 2025 Mapinduzi Cup =

International football tournament

Tournament details
- Host country: Zanzibar
- City: Gombani
- Dates: 3–13 January 2025
- Teams: 4 (from 1 confederation)
- Venue: 1 (in 1 host city)

Final positions
- Champions: Zanzibar (1st title)
- Runners-up: Burkina Faso
- Third place: Kenya
- Fourth place: Tanzania

Tournament statistics
- Matches played: 7
- Goals scored: 12 (1.71 per match)
- Top scorer(s): (Burkina Faso) Clément Pitroipa (Burkina Faso) Aboubacar Traoré (2 goals each)

The 2025 Mapinduzi Cup was an international association football friendly tournament that took place at the Gombani Stadium in Zanzibar. It was contested by four teams between 3 and 13 January 2025.

The tournament culminated in the final on 13 January which was contested by hosts Zanzibar and Burkina Faso. Goals from Ibrahim Hilika and Haji Cheda help Zanzibar to a 2–1 victory as they won the competition.

== Background ==
The tournament saw the return of Zanzibar to international football after a hiatus since December 2023.

== Venue ==
All matches were played at the Gombani Stadium in Gombani on Pemba Island, Zanzibar.

== Participants countries ==
Initially, six teams were due to contest the Mapinduzi Cup, but Burundi and South Sudan withdrew before the tournament began. The FIFA rankings used are as of 19 December 2024.

Country	Confederation	FIFA Ranking	Confederation Ranking
Burkina Faso	CAF	66	12
Burundi (Withdrew)	CAF	139	42
Kenya	CAF	108	25
South Sudan (Withdrew)	CAF	170	47
Tanzania	CAF	106	24
Zanzibar (Host)	CAF (associate member)	—N/a	—N/a

== Format ==
Initially, the six competing teams were to be split into two single round robin groups of three teams. The winners of the two groups would then play each other in the final. However, the tournament was reorganised following the withdrawal of Burundi and South Sudan. Instead, the four teams contesting the tournament would play each other once in a single round-robin group. The final would be contested the two teams finishing first and second in the group stage.

== Group stage ==
Pos.	Team	Pld.	W	D	L	GF	GA	GD	PTS	Qualification
1	Burkina Faso	3	2	1	0	4	1	+3	7	Qualified for final match
2	Zanzibar (H)	3	2	0	1	2	1	+1	6	Qualified for final match
3	Kenya	3	1	1	1	3	2	+1	4	
4	Tanzania	3	0	0	3	0	5	–5	0	

(H) Hosts

3 January 2025
17:15

Zanzibar	1–0	Tanzania
Salum 51'	Report

Gombani Stadium, Zanzibar
4 January 2025
17:15

Burkina Faso	1–1	Kenya
A. Traoré 89'	Report	Kinyanjui 45+3'

Gombani Stadium, Zanzibar
6 January 2025
16:00

Burkina Faso	1–0	Zanzibar
Sagné 74'	Report

Gombani Stadium, Zanzibar
7 January 2025
16:00

Tanzania	0–2	Kenya
	Report	Muchiri 55'; Ogam 68'

Gombani Stadium, Zanzibar
Attendance: 15,000
9 January 2025
16:45

Tanzania	0–2	Burkina Faso
	Report	Pitroipa 30', 40'

Gombani Stadium, Zanzibar
Attendance: 10,000
10 January 2025
16:00

Kenya	0–1	Zanzibar
	Report	Khatib 90+4'

Gombani Stadium, Zanzibar

== Final ==
The final was played on 13 January 2025 and when the two sides met in the group stage, Burkina Faso won 1–0.

Ibrahim Hilika gave the home side the lead four minutes before half-time, and during the second half, Burkina Faso continued to press before Aboubacar Traoré scored the equalising goal after 74 minutes. As the referee prepared to blow the final whistle, Haji Cheda made it 2–1 after he curled in his shot.

13 January 2025
17:15

Burkina Faso	1–2	Zanzibar
A. Traoré 74'	Report	Hilika 41'; Cheda 90+2'

Gombani Stadium, Zanzibar

== Statistics ==
=== Goalscorers ===
There have been 12 goals scored in 7 matches, for an average of 1.71 goals per match.

2 goals

- (Burkina Faso) Clément Pitroipa
- (Burkina Faso) Aboubacar Traoré

1 goal

- (Zanzibar) Faisal Salum
- (Zanzibar) Ali Khatib
- (Zanzibar) Ibrahim Hilika
- (Zanzibar) Haji Cheda
- (Burkina Faso) Hanaby Sagné
- (Kenya) James Kinyanjui
- (Kenya) Boniface Muchiri
- (Kenya) Ryan Ogam
