= 2022–23 Burkinabé Premier League =

Burkinabé Premier League
- Season: 2022–23
- Champions: AS Douanes
- Champions League: AS Douanes
- Matches played: 240
- Goals scored: 427 (1.78 per match)

The 2022–23 Burkinabé Premier League was a season of the Burkinabé Premier League, the top-tier football league in Burkina Faso.

AS Douanes clinched the championship in the 29th match day with a 2–1 win over AFSB. Led by manager Kamou Malo, this was the first title for Douanes.

== League Table ==
Pos	Team	Pld	W	D	L	GF	GA	GD	Pts	Qualification or relegation
1	AS Douanes (C)	30	19	10	1	49	18	+31	67	Champions, Qualification to the 2023–24 CAF Champions League
2	Salitas FC	30	18	8	4	45	23	+22	62	
3	Vitesse FC	30	14	8	8	35	28	+7	50	
4	Rahimo FC	30	13	9	8	31	23	+8	48	
5	ASF Bobo Dioulasso	30	10	14	6	37	26	+11	44	
6	Majestic FC	30	10	9	11	36	28	+8	39	
7	Rail Club du Kadiogo	30	8	14	8	18	23	−5	38	
8	USFA	30	9	9	12	24	26	−2	36	
9	ASFA Yennenga	30	8	12	10	20	22	−2	36	
10	Étoile Filante de Ouagadougou	30	9	9	12	24	28	−4	36	Qualification to the 2023–24 CAF Confederation Cup
11	AS Fonctionnaires	30	7	14	9	20	25	−5	35	
12	AS SONABEL	30	7	14	9	17	25	−8	35	
13	ASEC Koudougou	30	8	11	11	20	36	−16	35	
14	Royal FC	30	7	12	11	25	29	−4	33	
15	Réal du Faso (R)	30	5	12	13	15	24	−9	27	Relegation
16	AS Police (R)	30	1	9	20	11	43	−32	12	Relegation

Source: soccerway.com RSSSF
Rules for classification: 1) points; 2) goal difference; 3) number of goals scored.
(C) Champions; (R) Relegated

== Attendances ==
#	Football club	Average attendance
1	Étoile Filante de Ouagadougou	1,842
2	ASFA-Yennenga	1,711
3	AS Douanes BF	974
4	Salitas FC	945
5	Vitesse FC	731
6	Rahimo FC	617
7	ASF Bobo	582
8	Majestic FC	536
9	USFA	523
10	Rail Club du Kadiogo	481
11	AS Fonctionnaires	292
12	AS SONABEL	268
13	ASEC Koudougou	241
14	Royal FC	214
15	Réal du Faso	158
16	AS Police	153
