= Abdelkader Salhi (footballer) =

Algerian footballer (born 1993)

Personal information
- Full name: Abdelkader Salhi
- Date of birth: March 19, 1993 (age 33)
- Place of birth: Chlef, Algeria
- Height: 1.85 m (6 ft 1 in)
- Position: Goalkeeper

Team information
- Current team: JS Saoura
- Number: 1

Youth career
- ASO Chlef

Senior career*
Years	Team	Apps	(Gls)
2013–2016	ASO Chlef	46	(0)
2016–2018	CR Belouizdad	45	(0)
2018–2019	JS Kabylie	31	(0)
2020–2022	MC Alger	12	(0)
2022	Bergantiños FC	0	(0)
2023–2025	NC Magra	17	(0)
2025–2026	MC El Bayadh	41	(0)
2026–	JS Saoura	12	(0)

International career^{‡}
2014–2016	Algeria U23	18	(0)
2017–2018	Algeria A'	1	(0)
2017–2018	Algeria	4	(0)
- * Club domestic league appearances and goals as of 5 June 2026 ‡ National team caps and goals as of 14 September 2026

Abdelkader Salhi (Arabic: عبد القادر صالحي; born March 19, 1993) is an Algerian footballer who plays as a goalkeeper for JS Saoura.

== Club career ==
In 2016, he signed a two-year contract with CR Belouizdad. In 2018, he joined JS Kabylie. In 2020, he joined MC Alger. In 2023, he joined NC Magra. On 31 January 2026, he joined JS Saoura.

== International career ==
In November 2015, Salhi was selected as part of Algeria's squad for the 2015 Africa U-23 Cup of Nations.

Salhi made his debut for the senior Algeria national football team in a 1-0 2018 FIFA World Cup qualification loss to Zambia on 5 September 2017.
