= Stade Balibiè =

Stadium in Burkina Faso

Coordinates: 12.2481°N 2.3667°W

- Location: Koudougou, Burkina Faso
- Capacity: 5,000

Tenants
- ASEC Koudougou

Stade Balibiè is a multi-use stadium in Koudougou, Burkina Faso. It is currently used mostly for football matches and is the home stadium of Association Sportive des Employés et Commerçants de Koudougou. The stadium holds 5,000 people.
