= Ilyes Yaiche =

Algerian footballer (born 1997)

Personal information
- Full name: Ilyes Yaiche
- Date of birth: October 27, 1997 (age 29)
- Place of birth: Ouadhia, Algeria
- Position: Winger

Team information
- Current team: ES Mostaganem
- Number: 10

Youth career
- 2014–2015: ASM Oran
- 2015–2016: USM El Harrach

Senior career*
Years	Team	Apps	(Gls)
2016–2020	USM Alger	19	(0)
2018–2020	→ NA Hussein Dey (loan)	29	(1)
2020–2022	CS Constantine	37	(2)
2022–2023	Qadsia SC	2	(0)
2023–2025	USM Khenchela	46	(2)
2025–2026	MC El Bayadh	13	(1)
2026–	ES Mostaganem	0	(0)

International career
2015–2016	Algeria U20	4	(1)
- * Club domestic league appearances and goals as of 5 June 2026

Ilyes Yaiche (Arabic: إلياس يعيش; born October 27, 1997) is an Algerian footballer. He plays primarily as an Winger for ES Mostaganem.

== Club career ==
In June 2015, Yaiche was a member of the ASM Oran Under-18 team that won the Algerian U18 Cup, scoring a goal in the 3–1 win against USM El Harrach in the final.

In the summer of 2016, Yaiche signed a four-year contract with USM Alger.

In 2020, he signed a contract with CS Constantine.

On 31 January 2022, He joined Kuwaiti club Qadsia SC.

In January 2023, he signed a contract with USM Khenchela.
