= Abdellah El Moudene =

Algerian footballer (born 1994)

Personal information
- Full name: Rachid Abdellah El Moudene
- Date of birth: February 11, 1994 (age 32)
- Place of birth: Oran, Algeria
- Position: Midfielder

Team information
- Current team: ES Mostaganem
- Number: 10

Youth career
- 2007–2012: Paradou AC

Senior career*
Years	Team	Apps	(Gls)
2012–2013	Paris FC	5	(0)
2013–	Paradou AC		
2014–2015	→ RC Arbaâ (loan)	19	(1)
2015–2017	→ DRB Tadjenanet (loan)	51	(4)
2017–2018	→ MC Alger (loan)	25	(1)
2018	→ CA Bordj Bou Arréridj (loan)	12	(1)
2019	→ MC Oran (loan)	13	(0)
2019–2021	MC Alger	18	(0)
2021	MC Oujda	19	(0)
2021–2023	IR Tanger	21	(1)
2024–2025	MC El Bayadh	30	(2)
2025–	ES Mostaganem	19	(2)
- * Club domestic league appearances and goals as of 5 June 2026

Rachid Abdellah El Moudene (born February 11, 1994) is an Algerian footballer who plays as a midfielder for ES Mostaganem.
