= ASEC Koudougou =

Burkinabé football club

- Full name: Association Sportive des Employés et Commerçants de Koudougou
- Ground: Stade Balibiè; Koudougou, Burkina Faso
- Capacity: 5,000
- Chairman: Basile Paré
- Manager: François Yaméogo
- League: Second Division (II)
- 2024–25: 16th in Burkinabé Premier League
Home colours	Away colours

Association Sportive des Employés et Commerçants de Koudougou is a Burkinabé football club based in Koudougou. They play their home games at the Stade Balibiè.
