= Aïssa Boudechicha =

Algerian footballer (born 2000)

Personal information
- Full name: Aïssa Boudechicha
- Date of birth: 13 April 2000 (age 26)
- Place of birth: Medjana, Algeria
- Height: 1.80 m (5 ft 11 in)
- Position: Left-back

Team information
- Current team: ES Sétif
- Number: 5

Youth career
- OBM Medjana
- 2011–2018: CA Bordj Bou Arreridj

Senior career*
| Years | Team | Apps | (Gls) |
| 2018–2019 | ES Sétif | 1 | (0) |
| 2019–2023 | Bordeaux B | 21 | (0) |
| 2023–2025 | MC El Bayadh | 30 | (0) |
| 2025– | ES Sétif | 26 | (0) |

International career^{‡}
| 2018 | Algeria U20 | 1 | (0) |
| 2018– | Algeria U23 | 3 | (0) |
- * Club domestic league appearances and goals as of 5 June 2026 ‡ National team caps and goals as of 1 January 2022

Aïssa Boudechicha (Arabic: عيسى بودشيشة; born 13 April 2000) is an Algerian professional footballer who plays as a left-back for ES Sétif.

== Club career ==
Boudechicha started his career with his hometown club OBM Medjana before joining CA Bordj Bou Arreridj, where he spent seven years. On August 30, 2019, Boudechicha signed a four-year contract with French club Bordeaux.

In August 2023, he joined MC El Bayadh.
