= Zakaria Medjdoub Stadium =

Football stadium in El Bayadh, Algeria

- Interactive map of Zakaria Medjdoub Stadium
- Full name: Zakaria Medjdoub Stadium
- Location: El Bayadh, Algeria
- Coordinates: 33.6780°N 1.0212°E
- Owner: APC of El Bayadh
- Capacity: 15,000
- Surface: Artificial turf

Tenant
- MC El Bayadh

Zakaria Medjdoub Stadium (Arabic: ملعب زكرياء المجدوب) is a football stadium in El Bayadh, Algeria. The stadium holds 15,000 people. It serves as a home ground for MC El Bayadh which plays in Algerian Ligue Professionnelle 1.
