= El Bayadh =

El Bayadh البيض
- city
- City of El Bayadh
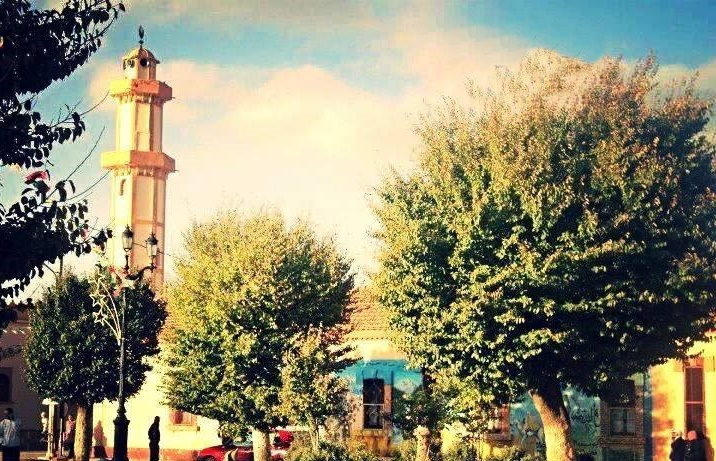
- View to El Nour mosque in El Bayadh

- Location of El Bayadh, Algeria within El Bayadh Province

- Location of El Bayadh within Algeria
- Coordinates: 33°40′49″N 1°01′13″E
- Country: Algeria
- Province: El Bayadh
- District: El Bayadh District

Government
  - PMA Seats: 11

Area
  - Total: 497 km^{2} (192 sq mi)
- Elevation: 1,347 m (4,419 ft)

Population (2008 Census)
  - Total: 85,577
  - Density: 172/km^{2} (446/sq mi)
- Time zone: UTC+01 (CET)
- Postal code: 32000
- ONS code: 3201
- Climate: BWk

El Bayadh (Arabic: البيض) is a municipality of Algeria. It is the capital of El Bayadh Province.

== History ==
This town was known as Géryville during the French colonization of Algeria.

== Geography ==
The Ksour Range is a mountainous area extending between Figuig and El Bayadh. The record of 51.3 °C degrees, which was on 2 September 1979, is disputed.

Climate data for El Bayadh (1991–2020)
Month	Jan	Feb	Mar	Apr	May	Jun	Jul	Aug	Sep	Oct	Nov	Dec	Year
Record high °C (°F)	21.1 (70.0)	23.9 (75.0)	28.0 (82.4)	30.0 (86.0)	36.7 (98.1)	39.6 (103.3)	40.4 (104.7)	39.5 (103.1)	39.3 (102.7)	31.4 (88.5)	26.2 (79.2)	23.8 (74.8)	40.4 (104.7)
Mean daily maximum °C (°F)	10.0 (50.0)	11.8 (53.2)	15.5 (59.9)	19.3 (66.7)	24.7 (76.5)	30.6 (87.1)	35.0 (95.0)	33.9 (93.0)	28.1 (82.6)	21.8 (71.2)	14.5 (58.1)	10.8 (51.4)	21.3 (70.3)
Daily mean °C (°F)	4.9 (40.8)	6.3 (43.3)	9.7 (49.5)	13.1 (55.6)	18.1 (64.6)	23.6 (74.5)	27.9 (82.2)	27.0 (80.6)	21.8 (71.2)	16.1 (61.0)	9.5 (49.1)	6.0 (42.8)	15.3 (59.5)
Mean daily minimum °C (°F)	−0.2 (31.6)	0.8 (33.4)	3.9 (39.0)	7.0 (44.6)	11.5 (52.7)	16.6 (61.9)	20.8 (69.4)	20.0 (68.0)	15.4 (59.7)	10.4 (50.7)	4.4 (39.9)	1.2 (34.2)	9.3 (48.7)
Record low °C (°F)	−9.4 (15.1)	−8.6 (16.5)	−8.0 (17.6)	−4.0 (24.8)	0.0 (32.0)	5.5 (41.9)	9.0 (48.2)	11.2 (52.2)	3.6 (38.5)	−0.6 (30.9)	−5.0 (23.0)	−8.4 (16.9)	−9.4 (15.1)
Average precipitation mm (inches)	24.5 (0.96)	18.8 (0.74)	29.1 (1.15)	30.5 (1.20)	20.9 (0.82)	14.4 (0.57)	6.9 (0.27)	15.8 (0.62)	29.2 (1.15)	34.9 (1.37)	30.2 (1.19)	24.5 (0.96)	279.7 (11.01)
Average precipitation days (≥ 1.0 mm)	5.2	3.9	4.9	4.7	3.3	2.4	1.7	3.6	4.3	4.1	4.1	5.3	47.5
Source 1: NOAA
Source 2:
