= MC El Bayadh =

Algerian football club

MC El-Bayadh
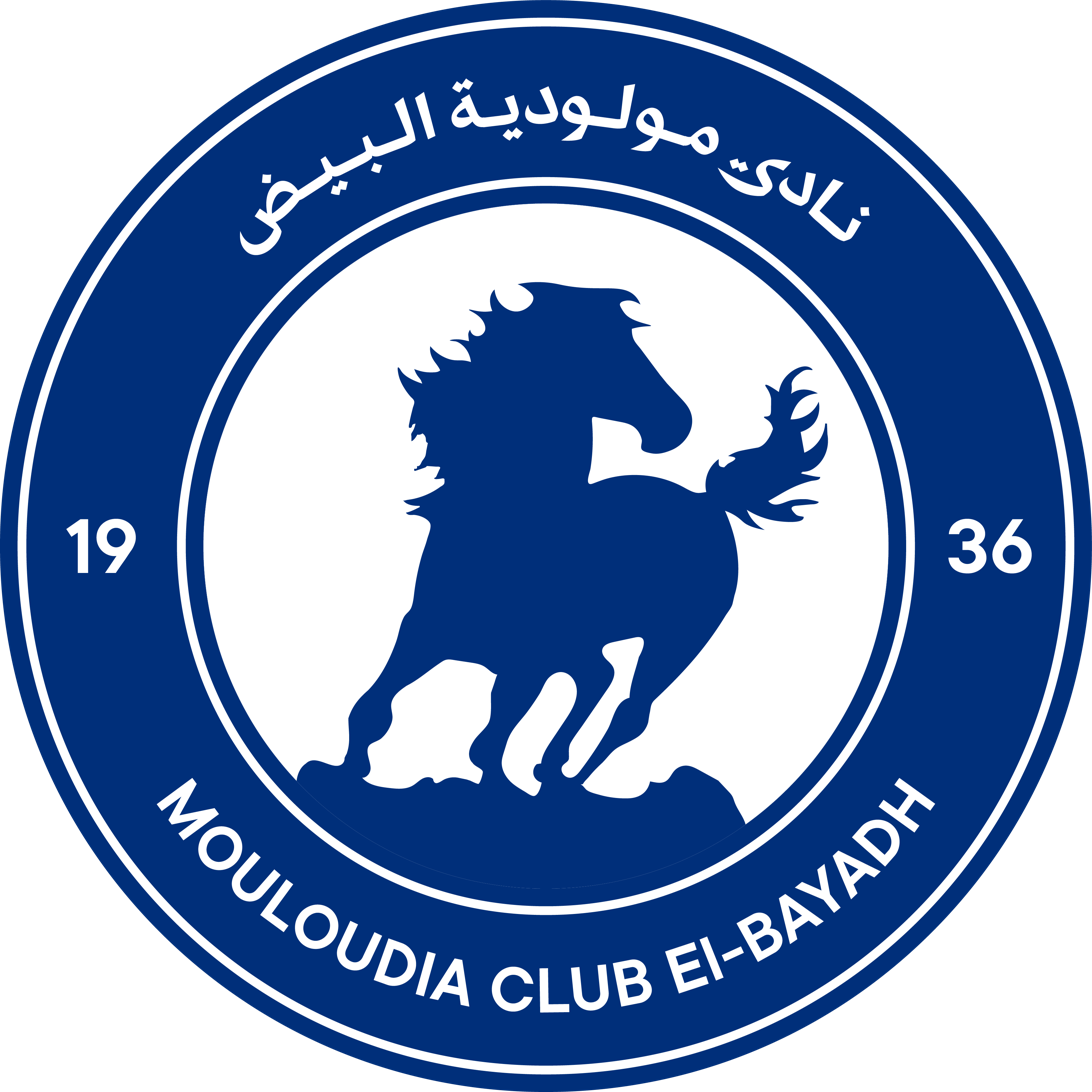
- Full name: Mouloudia Club El Bayadh
- Founded: 1936 as Mouloudia Club Gereyville
- Ground: Zakaria Medjdoub Stadium
- Capacity: 15,000
- President: Mohamed Belhakat
- Head Coach: Majdi El Kourdi
- League: League 2
- 2025–26: Ligue 1, 16th of 16 (relegated)
Home colours	Away colours	Third colours

Mouloudia Club El-Bayadh (Arabic: نادي مولودية البيض), known as MC El-Bayadh or simply MCEB for short, is an Algerian football club based in El Bayadh. The club was founded in 1936 and its colours are white and blue. Their home stadium, Zakaria Medjdoub Stadium, has a capacity of 15,000 spectators. The club is currently playing in the Algerian League 2.

== History ==
On June 30, 2021, MC El Bayadh were promoted to the Algerian Ligue 2.

On May 21, 2022, MC El Bayadh was promoted to the Algerian Ligue Professionnelle 1.

On December 22, 2023, the bus taking the team to face JSK overturned in Sougueur, Tiaret, resulting in the deaths of reserve goalkeeper Zakaria Bouziani and assistant head-coach Khalid Muftah. The Algerian Football Federation opted to postpone all scheduled football matches for the upcoming weekend

== Personnel ==
=== Current technical staff ===
Position	Staff
Head coach	
Assistant coach	
Goalkeeping coach	
Fitness coach	
