= 2018 African Nations Championship squads =

The 2018 African Nations Championship was an international football tournament held in Morocco from 13 January to 4 February 2018. Unlike the Africa Cup of Nations, this tournament requires players to be registered to a club within the country to be eligible. The 16 national teams involved in the tournament were required to register a squad of 23 players, including three goalkeepers. Only players in these squads were eligible to take part in the tournament. The squads were announced on 10 January 2018.

== Group A ==
=== Morocco ===
Manager: Jamal Sellami

No.	Pos.	Player	Date of birth (age)	Caps	Goals	Club
1	GK	Anas Zniti	28 August 1988 (aged 29)	4	0	(Royal Moroccan Football Federation) Raja Casablanca
12	GK	Abdelali Mhamdi	29 November 1991 (aged 26)	2	0	(Royal Moroccan Football Federation) RSB
22	GK	Ahmed Reda Tagnaouti	5 April 1996 (aged 21)	1	0	(Royal Moroccan Football Federation) Ittihad Tanger
3	DF	Hamza Semmoumy	2 November 1992 (aged 25)	2	0	(Royal Moroccan Football Federation) FUS
4	DF	Nayef Aguerd	30 March 1996 (aged 21)	1	0	(Royal Moroccan Football Federation) FUS
5	DF	Jawad El Yamiq	29 February 1992 (aged 25)	9	1	(Royal Moroccan Football Federation) Raja Casablanca
13	DF	Badr Banoun	30 September 1993 (aged 24)	4	1	(Royal Moroccan Football Federation) Raja Casablanca
15	DF	Marouane Hadhoudi	13 February 1992 (aged 25)	0	0	(Royal Moroccan Football Federation) DHJ
16	DF	Mohamed Nahiri	22 October 1991 (aged 26)	5	0	(Royal Moroccan Football Federation) Wydad Casablanca
20	DF	Abdeljalil Jbira	1 September 1990 (aged 27)	6	0	(Royal Moroccan Football Federation) Raja Casablanca
21	DF	Zakaria El Hachimi	4 August 1987 (aged 30)	9	0	(Royal Moroccan Football Federation) Wydad Casablanca
2	MF	Yahya Jabrane	18 June 1991 (aged 26)	0	0	(Royal Moroccan Football Federation) HUSA
6	MF	Badr Boulahroud	21 April 1993 (aged 24)	2	1	(Royal Moroccan Football Federation) FUS
8	MF	Salaheddine Saidi	6 February 1987 (aged 30)	14	0	(Royal Moroccan Football Federation) Wydad Casablanca
10	MF	Walid El Karti	23 July 1994 (aged 23)	3	0	(Royal Moroccan Football Federation) Wydad Casablanca
18	MF	Abdelilah Hafidi	30 January 1992 (aged 25)	13	3	(Royal Moroccan Football Federation) Raja Casablanca
19	MF	Barrahma El Mehdi	7 December 1992 (aged 25)	0	0	(Royal Moroccan Football Federation) AS FAR
7	FW	Zakaria Hadraf	12 March 1990 (aged 27)	8	0	(Royal Moroccan Football Federation) Raja Casablanca
9	FW	Ayoub El Kaabi	25 June 1993 (aged 24)	0	0	(Royal Moroccan Football Federation) RSB
11	FW	Ismail Haddad	3 August 1990 (aged 27)	6	1	(Royal Moroccan Football Federation) Wydad Casablanca
14	FW	Ahmed Hammoudan	12 July 1991 (aged 26)	2	0	(Royal Moroccan Football Federation) Ittihad Tanger
17	FW	Achraf Bencharki	24 September 1994 (aged 23)	3	0	(Royal Moroccan Football Federation) Wydad Casablanca
23	FW	Ayoub Nanah	12 November 1992 (aged 25)	1	2	(Royal Moroccan Football Federation) DHJ

=== Guinea ===
Manager: Lappé Bangoura

No.	Pos.	Player	Date of birth (age)	Club
1	GK	Abdoulaye Kanté	18 February 1993 (aged 24)	(Guinean Football Federation) Horoya
16	GK	Abdoulaye Camara Faléssadé	19 August 1996 (aged 21)	(Guinean Football Federation) Kamsar
22	GK	Abdoulaye Sylla	2 February 1995 (aged 22)	(Guinean Football Federation) Hafia
2	DF	Alsény Bangoura	1 October 1993 (aged 24)	(Guinean Football Federation) Horoya
3	DF	Mohamed Bangoura	14 March 1996 (aged 21)	(Guinean Football Federation) Satellite
5	DF	Jean Claude Landel	13 July 1998 (aged 19)	(Guinean Football Federation) Hafia
12	DF	Aboubaca Camara	8 March 1991 (aged 26)	(Guinean Football Federation) Horoya
13	DF	Alsény Camara	1 June 1996 (aged 21)	(Guinean Football Federation) Horoya
14	DF	Désiré Yaovi	13 December 1997 (aged 20)	(Guinean Football Federation) Wakriya
15	DF	Ismael Sylla	1 January 1998 (aged 20)	(Guinean Football Federation) Fello Star
17	DF	Abdoulaye Naby Camara	1 January 1994 (aged 24)	(Guinean Football Federation) Kamsar
4	MF	Mohamed Thiam	22 June 1996 (aged 21)	(Guinean Football Federation) AS Kaloum Star
6	MF	Ibrahima Sory Sankhon	1 January 1996 (aged 22)	(Guinean Football Federation) Horoya
8	MF	Mohamed N'diaye	29 December 1997 (aged 20)	(Guinean Football Federation) Horoya
20	MF	Daouda Bangoura	1 January 1994 (aged 24)	(Guinean Football Federation) AS Kaloum Star
23	MF	Saliou Camara	5 August 1996 (aged 21)	(Guinean Football Federation) Fello Star
7	FW	Amadou Oury Barry	20 October 1998 (aged 19)	(Guinean Football Federation) Elephants de Coleah
9	FW	Aboubacar Camara	10 July 1998 (aged 19)	(Guinean Football Federation) Hafia
10	FW	Saïdouba Bissiri Camara	25 February 1995 (aged 22)	(Guinean Football Federation) AS Kaloum Star
11	FW	Daouda Camara	20 August 1997 (aged 20)	(Guinean Football Federation) Horoya
18	FW	Sékou Amadou Camara	23 September 1997 (aged 20)	(Guinean Football Federation) Horoya
19	FW	Jean Charles Fernandez	20 January 1998 (aged 19)	(Guinean Football Federation) ASFAG
21	FW	Sekou Keita	1 January 1997 (aged 21)	(Guinean Football Federation) Milo FC

=== Sudan ===
Manager: (Croatia) Zdravko Logarušić

No.	Pos.	Player	Date of birth (age)	Caps	Goals	Club
1	GK	Awad Elkarim Kafi	2 October 1986 (aged 31)	1	0	(Sudan Football Association) Al-Hilal SC (Al-Ubayyid)
16	GK	Akram El Hadi Salim	27 March 1987 (aged 30)	37	0	(Sudan Football Association) Al-Hilal SC (Al-Ubayyid)
21	GK	Munjed Alnil	1 January 1996 (aged 22)	0	0	(Sudan Football Association) Al-Merrikh SC
3	DF	Hussein Al Jarf	23 September 1998 (aged 19)	3	0	(Sudan Football Association) Al-Hilal Club
4	DF	Omer Suleiman	9 December 1989 (aged 28)	4	1	(Sudan Football Association) Wad Hashim SC (Sennar)
5	DF	Bakri Bashir	1 January 1990 (aged 28)	13	0	(Sudan Football Association) Al-Hilal SC (Al-Ubayyid)
6	DF	Hamza Dawoud	2 October 1994 (aged 23)	12	0	(Sudan Football Association) Al Khartoum SC
14	DF	Muhamed Hagar	4 September 1994 (aged 23)	5	0	(Sudan Football Association) Al-Merrikh SC
15	DF	Athar El Tahir	24 October 1996 (aged 21)	19	6	(Sudan Football Association) Al-Hilal Club
18	DF	Samawal Merghani	22 October 1991 (aged 26)	4	0	(Sudan Football Association) Al-Hilal Club
20	DF	Ahmed Bibo	1 September 1994 (aged 23)	3	0	(Sudan Football Association) Al-Merrikh SC
22	DF	Abdellatif Boya	28 July 1989 (aged 28)	21	0	(Sudan Football Association) Al-Hilal Club
2	MF	Abuaagla Abdalla	11 March 1993 (aged 24)	21	0	(Sudan Football Association) Al-Hilal Club
7	MF	Tajeldin Yagoub	4 September 1993 (aged 24)	1	0	(Sudan Football Association) Al-Merrikh SC
8	MF	Muhamed Alteket	16 August 1989 (aged 28)	4	0	(Sudan Football Association) Al-Merrikh SC
10	MF	Muhannad El Tahir (Captain)	3 December 1984 (aged 33)	69	11	(Sudan Football Association) Al-Hilal SC (Al-Ubayyid)
12	MF	Altaher Alhaj	5 October 1989 (aged 28)	27	0	(Sudan Football Association) Al-Hilal Club
17	MF	Alsamani Alsawi	31 October 1991 (aged 26)	4	1	(Sudan Football Association) Al-Merrikh SC
19	MF	Mohamed Ahmed Bashir	22 July 1983 (aged 34)	30	5	(Sudan Football Association) Al-Hilal Club
23	MF	Nasr Eldin El Shigail	7 April 1985 (aged 32)	41	0	(Sudan Football Association) Al-Hilal Club
9	FW	Seif Teiri	1 January 1994 (aged 24)	12	5	(Sudan Football Association) Al Khartoum SC
11	FW	Muaaz Al-Quoz	25 April 1989 (aged 28)	15	1	(Sudan Football Association) Al-Hilal SC (Al-Ubayyid)
13	FW	Walaa Eldin Musa	1 January 2000 (aged 18)	7	3	(Sudan Football Association) Al-Hilal Club

=== Mauritania ===
Manager: (France) Corentin Martins

No.	Pos.	Player	Date of birth (age)	Club
1	GK	Brahim Souleymane	30 December 1986 (aged 31)	(Football Federation of the Islamic Republic of Mauritania) Nouadhibou
16	GK	Mohamed Salahdine Boubacar	31 December 1997 (aged 20)	(Football Federation of the Islamic Republic of Mauritania) Tevragh-Zeina
22	GK	Namori Diaw	30 December 1994 (aged 23)	(Football Federation of the Islamic Republic of Mauritania) Kédia
2	DF	Moustapha Diaw	31 December 1996 (aged 21)	(Football Federation of the Islamic Republic of Mauritania) Tevragh-Zeina
3	DF	El Hassen Houeibib	31 October 1993 (aged 24)	(Football Federation of the Islamic Republic of Mauritania) Garde Ntle
4	DF	Mohamed Wade	31 December 1985 (aged 32)	(Football Federation of the Islamic Republic of Mauritania) Nouadhibou
5	DF	Sidi Mohamed Bilal	23 December 1987 (aged 30)	(Football Federation of the Islamic Republic of Mauritania) Tevragh-Zeina
6	DF	Lemrabott El Hacen	24 March 1997 (aged 20)	(Football Federation of the Islamic Republic of Mauritania) Nouadhibou
12	DF	Demba Trawre	30 September 1993 (aged 24)	(Football Federation of the Islamic Republic of Mauritania) Ksar
13	DF	Youba Zeidane	13 February 1999 (aged 18)	(Football Federation of the Islamic Republic of Mauritania) Concorde
15	DF	Oumar Mangane	31 December 1992 (aged 25)	(Football Federation of the Islamic Republic of Mauritania) Nouadhibou
8	MF	El Hassen Teguedi	30 December 1999 (aged 18)	(Football Federation of the Islamic Republic of Mauritania) Tidjikja
14	MF	Mohamed Dellahi Yali	1 November 1997 (aged 20)	(Football Federation of the Islamic Republic of Mauritania) Tidjikja
17	MF	Moussa Bagayoko	31 December 1983 (aged 34)	(Football Federation of the Islamic Republic of Mauritania) Tevragh-Zeina
18	MF	Alassane Diop	22 September 1997 (aged 20)	(Football Federation of the Islamic Republic of Mauritania) Nouadhibou
20	MF	Moussa Samba	30 December 1988 (aged 29)	(Football Federation of the Islamic Republic of Mauritania) Tevragh-Zeina
21	MF	Abdou El Id	16 June 1999 (aged 18)	(Football Federation of the Islamic Republic of Mauritania) Concorde
18	MF	Abdoulaye Sileye Gaye	13 September 1991 (aged 26)	(Football Federation of the Islamic Republic of Mauritania) Nouadhibou
7	FW	Hemeya Tanjy	1 May 1998 (aged 19)	(Football Federation of the Islamic Republic of Mauritania) Tidjikja
9	FW	Karamokho Traore	11 September 1988 (aged 29)	(Football Federation of the Islamic Republic of Mauritania) Tevragh-Zeina
10	FW	Boubacar Bagili	7 December 1994 (aged 23)	(Football Federation of the Islamic Republic of Mauritania) Ksar
11	FW	Cheikh Moulaye Ahmed	5 December 1987 (aged 30)	(Football Federation of the Islamic Republic of Mauritania) Nouadhibou
19	FW	Ely Cheikh Voulany	31 December 1988 (aged 29)	(Football Federation of the Islamic Republic of Mauritania) Nouadhibou

== Group B ==
=== Ivory Coast ===
Manager: Ibrahim Kamara

No.	Pos.	Player	Date of birth (age)	Club
1	GK	Hortalin Zadi	7 November 1989 (aged 28)	(Ivorian Football Federation) Africa Sports d'Abidjan
16	GK	Mamadou Sylla	7 January 1990 (aged 28)	(Ivorian Football Federation) ASI Abengourou
23	GK	Abdoul Karim Cissé	20 October 1985 (aged 32)	(Ivorian Football Federation) ASEC Mimosas
2	DF	Willie Britto	15 December 1996 (aged 21)	(Ivorian Football Federation) Tanda
3	DF	Arnaud Kotouan Akassou	13 February 1990 (aged 27)	(Ivorian Football Federation) ASEC Mimosas
4	DF	Wonlo Coulibaly	22 December 1991 (aged 26)	(Ivorian Football Federation) ASEC Mimosas
13	DF	Romaric Kévin Yao Konan	5 December 1994 (aged 23)	(Ivorian Football Federation) AFAD Djékanou
22	DF	Christian Angbandji	12 November 1993 (aged 24)	(Ivorian Football Federation) ASEC Mimosas
5	MF	Essis Baudelaire Aka	10 January 1990 (aged 28)	(Ivorian Football Federation) Tanda
6	MF	Hamed Hervé Diomandé	17 June 1988 (aged 29)	(Ivorian Football Federation) ASEC Mimosas
8	MF	Brou Manasse N'Goh	10 December 1996 (aged 21)	(Ivorian Football Federation) AFAD Djékanou
10	MF	Inza Diabaté	20 May 1992 (aged 25)	(Ivorian Football Federation) FC San Pédro
12	MF	Banfa Sylla	19 July 1996 (aged 21)	(Ivorian Football Federation) ASI Abengourou
15	MF	Romuald Kouassi Diallo	4 June 1989 (aged 28)	(Ivorian Football Federation) WAC
17	MF	Raoul Yao Konan	23 December 1990 (aged 27)	(Ivorian Football Federation) Séwé
18	MF	Souleymane Diaby	8 October 1999 (aged 18)	(Ivorian Football Federation) Gagnoa
21	MF	Pacôme Zouzoua	30 April 1997 (aged 20)	(Ivorian Football Federation) Gagnoa
7	FW	William Togui	7 August 1996 (aged 21)	(Ivorian Football Federation) Gagnoa
9	FW	Kouamé N'Guessan	26 December 1996 (aged 21)	(Ivorian Football Federation) Séwé
11	FW	Alphonse Yao Kouamé 'Fonsinho'	17 August 1996 (aged 21)	(Ivorian Football Federation) ASEC Mimosas
14	FW	Mohamed Sanogo Vieira	30 July 1993 (aged 24)	(Ivorian Football Federation) Gagnoa
19	FW	Mamadou Diomandé	1 January 1989 (aged 29)	(Ivorian Football Federation) Africa Sports d'Abidjan
20	FW	Irié Roland Zan Bi	7 June 1996 (aged 21)	(Ivorian Football Federation) WAC

=== Zambia ===
Manager: Wedson Nyirenda

No.	Pos.	Player	Date of birth (age)	Club
1	GK	Moses Mapulanga	27 January 1993 (aged 24)	(Football Association of Zambia) Power Dynamos
18	GK	Toaster Nsabata	24 November 1993 (aged 24)	(Football Association of Zambia) Zanaco
22	GK	Allan Chibwe	22 March 1991 (aged 26)	(Football Association of Zambia) Power Dynamos
2	DF	John Mwengani	30 December 1994 (aged 23)	(Football Association of Zambia) Nkana
3	DF	Lawrence Chungu	11 November 1991 (aged 26)	(Football Association of Zambia) Nkana
4	DF	Adrian Chama	18 March 1989 (aged 28)	(Football Association of Zambia) Green Buffaloes
6	DF	Simon Silwimba	25 December 1991 (aged 26)	(Football Association of Zambia) ZESCO United
15	DF	Donashano Malama	1 September 1991 (aged 26)	(Football Association of Zambia) Nkana
19	DF	Ziyo Tembo	30 June 1985 (aged 32)	(Football Association of Zambia) Zanaco
20	DF	Fackson Kapumbu	6 October 1990 (aged 27)	(Football Association of Zambia) ZESCO United
21	DF	Isaac Shamujompa	12 October 1994 (aged 23)	(Football Association of Zambia) Nchanga Rangers
7	MF	Ernest Mbewe	11 November 1994 (aged 23)	(Football Association of Zambia) Zanaco
8	MF	Chanda Mushili	26 January 1988 (aged 29)	(Football Association of Zambia) Lumwana Radiants
11	MF	Mike Katiba	7 February 1994 (aged 23)	(Football Association of Zambia) Green Buffaloes
12	MF	Larry Bwalya	29 May 1995 (aged 22)	(Football Association of Zambia) Power Dynamos
13	MF	Godfrey Ngwenya	22 June 1996 (aged 21)	(Football Association of Zambia) Power Dynamos
14	MF	Jackson Chirwa	11 June 1995 (aged 22)	(Football Association of Zambia) Green Buffaloes
16	MF	Kondwani Mtonga	12 February 1984 (aged 33)	(Football Association of Zambia) ZESCO United
5	FW	Lazarous Kambole	20 January 1994 (aged 23)	(Football Association of Zambia) ZESCO United
9	FW	Martin Phiri	2 May 1991 (aged 26)	(Football Association of Zambia) Power Dynamos
10	FW	Alex Ngonga	21 August 1992 (aged 25)	(Football Association of Zambia) Power Dynamos
17	FW	Augustine Mulenga	17 January 1990 (aged 27)	(Football Association of Zambia) Zanaco
23	FW	Friday Samu	9 May 1995 (aged 22)	(Football Association of Zambia) Green Buffaloes

=== Uganda ===
Manager: (France) Sébastien Desabre

No.	Pos.	Player	Date of birth (age)	Club
1	GK	Benjamin Ochan	18 September 1989 (aged 28)	(Federation of Uganda Football Associations) KCCA
18	GK	Keni Saidi	14 October 1999 (aged 18)	(Federation of Uganda Football Associations) Proline
19	GK	Ismail Watenga	15 May 1995 (aged 22)	(Federation of Uganda Football Associations) Vipers
2	DF	Abubakar Kasule	5 January 1999 (aged 19)	(Federation of Uganda Football Associations) Express
3	DF	Joseph Nsubuga	9 October 1996 (aged 21)	(Federation of Uganda Football Associations) SC Villa
4	DF	Bernard Muwanga	25 August 1993 (aged 24)	(Federation of Uganda Football Associations) SC Villa
5	DF	Musitafa Mujuzi	5 May 1999 (aged 18)	(Federation of Uganda Football Associations) Proline
8	DF	Aggrey Madoi	20 November 1994 (aged 23)	(Federation of Uganda Football Associations) Police FC
14	DF	Nicholas Wadada	27 July 1994 (aged 23)	(Federation of Uganda Football Associations) Vipers
20	DF	Isaac Muleme	10 October 1992 (aged 25)	(Federation of Uganda Football Associations) KCCA
21	DF	Timothy Awany	6 August 1996 (aged 21)	(Federation of Uganda Football Associations) KCCA
6	MF	Moses Waiswa	20 April 1997 (aged 20)	(Federation of Uganda Football Associations) Vipers
10	MF	Muzamir Mutyaba	10 October 1993 (aged 24)	(Federation of Uganda Football Associations) KCCA
12	MF	Paul Mucureezi	11 February 1993 (aged 24)	(Federation of Uganda Football Associations) KCCA
13	MF	Seif Batte	25 October 1992 (aged 25)	(Federation of Uganda Football Associations) Bright Stars
15	MF	Ibrahim Juma	1 October 1993 (aged 24)	(Federation of Uganda Football Associations) KCCA
17	MF	Allan Kyambadde	15 January 1996 (aged 21)	(Federation of Uganda Football Associations) SC Villa
22	MF	Taddeo Lwanga	21 May 1994 (aged 23)	(Federation of Uganda Football Associations) Vipers
7	FW	Rahmat Senfuka	4 April 1993 (aged 24)	(Federation of Uganda Football Associations) Police FC
9	FW	Nelson Senkatuka	10 September 1997 (aged 20)	(Federation of Uganda Football Associations) Bright Stars
11	FW	Derrick Nsibambi	19 June 1994 (aged 23)	(Federation of Uganda Football Associations) KCCA
16	FW	Muhammad Shaban	1 January 1998 (aged 20)	(Federation of Uganda Football Associations) KCCA
23	FW	Milton Karisa	25 July 1995 (aged 22)	(Federation of Uganda Football Associations) Vipers

=== Namibia ===
Manager: Ricardo Mannetti

No.	Pos.	Player	Date of birth (age)	Club
1	GK	Lloyd Kazapua	25 March 1989 (aged 28)	(Namibia Football Association) African Stars
16	GK	Aluis Uirab	10 March 1985 (aged 32)	(Namibia Football Association) UNAM
23	GK	Edward Maova	5 September 1994 (aged 23)	(Namibia Football Association) Civics
2	DF	Teberius Lombard	24 May 1989 (aged 28)	(Namibia Football Association) Tura Magic
3	DF	Vetunuavi Hambira	3 June 1990 (aged 27)	(Namibia Football Association) Tura Magic
4	DF	Welwin Hanamub	8 February 1995 (aged 22)	(Namibia Football Association) Orlando Pirates
5	DF	Ferdinand Karongee	27 January 1984 (aged 33)	(Namibia Football Association) Tigers
8	DF	Dynamo Fredericks	4 April 1992 (aged 25)	(Namibia Football Association) Black Africa
13	DF	Emilio Martin	15 August 1990 (aged 27)	(Namibia Football Association) Black Africa
18	DF	Vitapi Ngaruka	16 October 1995 (aged 22)	(Namibia Football Association) Black Africa
20	DF	Edmund Kambanda	3 March 1993 (aged 24)	(Namibia Football Association) UNAM
6	MF	Kaovisa Hengombe	21 January 1994 (aged 23)	(Namibia Football Association) Young African
12	MF	Ronald Ketjijere	12 December 1987 (aged 30)	(Namibia Football Association) African Stars
14	MF	Oswaldo Xamseb	24 February 1992 (aged 25)	(Namibia Football Association) Tura Magic
15	MF	Benyamen Nenkavu	14 June 1993 (aged 24)	(Namibia Football Association) Tigers
19	MF	Petrus Shitembi	11 May 1992 (aged 25)	(Namibia Football Association) Tura Magic
7	FW	Nandjebo Theophilus	4 September 1991 (aged 26)	(Namibia Football Association) Tura Magic
9	FW	Roger Katjiteo	26 March 1993 (aged 24)	(Namibia Football Association) Tigers
10	FW	Hendrik Somaeb	29 September 1992 (aged 25)	(Namibia Football Association) Blue Waters
11	FW	Absalom Iimbondi	11 October 1991 (aged 26)	(Namibia Football Association) Tigers
17	FW	Itamunua Keimuine	1 May 1993 (aged 24)	(Namibia Football Association) Tura Magic
21	FW	Kleopas Useb	25 November 1994 (aged 23)	(Namibia Football Association) Life Fighters
22	FW	Panduleni Nekundi	14 September 1988 (aged 29)	(Namibia Football Association) African Stars

== Group C ==
=== Libya ===
Coach: Omar Al-Maryami

No.	Pos.	Player	Date of birth (age)	Caps	Goals	Club
1	GK	Muhammad Nashnoush	14 June 1988 (aged 29)	45	0	(Libyan Football Federation) Al Ahli Tripoli
12	GK	Fathi Rasheed	11 December 1988 (aged 29)	0	0	(Libyan Football Federation) Al Tahaddy
22	GK	Ahmed Azzaqa	9 August 1988 (aged 29)	1	0	(Libyan Football Federation) Al-Madina
2	DF	Ahmed Al-Maghasi	10 February 1993 (aged 24)	0	0	(Libyan Football Federation) Al-Ittihad Tripoli
3	DF	Motasem Sabbou	20 August 1993 (aged 24)	27	1	(Libyan Football Federation) Al-Ittihad Tripoli
4	DF	Saed Ajbarah	18 July 1996 (aged 21)	0	0	(Libyan Football Federation) Al-Nasr
8	DF	Sand Masaud	17 May 1992 (aged 25)	0	0	(Libyan Football Federation) Al Ahli Tripoli
9	DF	Abdelsalam Alaqoub	22 July 1993 (aged 24)	0	0	(Libyan Football Federation) Al-Ittihad Tripoli
11	DF	Moftah Taktak	5 May 1996 (aged 21)	0	0	(Libyan Football Federation) Al-Nasr
15	DF	Ahmed El Trbi	6 June 1992 (aged 25)	0	0	(Libyan Football Federation) Al-Ittihad Tripoli
16	DF	Ali Maetouq	4 January 1988 (aged 30)	6	0	(Libyan Football Federation) Al Ahli Tripoli
6	MF	Mohamed Aleyat	10 July 1991 (aged 26)	0	0	(Libyan Football Federation) Al Ahli Tripoli
13	MF	Mohamed Elhouni	19 June 1992 (aged 25)	0	0	(Libyan Football Federation) Al-Ittihad Tripoli
17	MF	Abdulrahman Khalleefah	20 July 1984 (aged 33)	0	0	(Libyan Football Federation) Al Ahli Tripoli
18	MF	Bader Ahmed	1 October 1987 (aged 30)	0	0	(Libyan Football Federation) Al Ahli Tripoli
20	MF	Abdulmuen Khumaj	4 October 1988 (aged 29)	0	0	(Libyan Football Federation) Al-Ittihad Tripoli
5	FW	Amer Muftah	8 January 1992 (aged 26)	0	0	(Libyan Football Federation) Al Tahaddy
7	FW	Salem Ablo	26 April 1991 (aged 26)	14	1	(Libyan Football Federation) Al Ahli Tripoli
10	FW	Zakaria Alharaish	23 October 1998 (aged 19)	0	0	(Libyan Football Federation) Al Ahli Tripoli
14	FW	Muhanad Madeen	25 March 1994 (aged 23)	0	0	(Libyan Football Federation) Al Ahli Tripoli
19	FW	Elmutasem Abushnaf	18 October 1990 (aged 27)	6	1	(Libyan Football Federation) Al-Madina
21	FW	Saleh Al Taher	1 January 1992 (aged 26)	0	0	(Libyan Football Federation) Al Ahli Tripoli
23	FW	Omar Aribi Hammad	8 January 1992 (aged 26)	0	0	(Libyan Football Federation) Al-Madina

=== Nigeria ===
Manager: Salisu Yusuf

No.	Pos.	Player	Date of birth (age)	Club
1	GK	Ikechukwu Ezenwa	16 October 1988 (aged 29)	(Nigeria Football Federation) Enyimba
16	GK	Dele Ajiboye	7 August 1990 (aged 27)	(Nigeria Football Federation) Plateau United
23	GK	Theophilus Afelokhai	7 April 1990 (aged 27)	(Nigeria Football Federation) Enyimba
2	DF	Osas Okoro	7 September 1990 (aged 27)	(Nigeria Football Federation) Enugu Rangers
3	DF	Daniel James	14 December 1996 (aged 21)	(Nigeria Football Federation) Plateau United
5	DF	Kalu Orji	19 June 1992 (aged 25)	(Nigeria Football Federation) Enugu Rangers
6	DF	Stephen Eze	8 March 1994 (aged 23)	(Nigeria Football Federation) Kano Pillars
12	DF	Ikouwem Udo	11 November 1999 (aged 18)	(Nigeria Football Federation) Enyimba
14	DF	Timothy Danladi	15 October 1996 (aged 21)	(Nigeria Football Federation) Katsina United
17	DF	Ifeanyi Nweke	12 November 1997 (aged 20)	(Nigeria Football Federation) Kano Pillars
19	DF	Abdullahi Musa	1 February 1996 (aged 21)	(Nigeria Football Federation) Wikki Tourists
8	MF	Ifeanyi Ifeanyi	15 August 1995 (aged 22)	(Nigeria Football Federation) Akwa United
10	MF	Rabiu Ali	27 September 1990 (aged 27)	(Nigeria Football Federation) Kano Pillars
15	MF	Dayo Ojo	10 October 1994 (aged 23)	(Nigeria Football Federation) Sunshine Stars
18	MF	Augustine Oladapo	27 July 1995 (aged 22)	(Nigeria Football Federation) Enyimba
4	FW	Emeka Atuloma	1 October 1992 (aged 25)	(Nigeria Football Federation) Rivers United
7	FW	Emeka Ogbugh	22 February 1990 (aged 27)	(Nigeria Football Federation) Rivers United
9	FW	Anthony Okpotu	5 March 1994 (aged 23)	(Nigeria Football Federation) Lobi Stars
11	FW	Peter Moses	8 April 1999 (aged 18)	(Nigeria Football Federation) Plateau United
13	FW	Ibrahim Mustapha	1 September 1996 (aged 21)	(Nigeria Football Federation) Enyimba
20	FW	Mohammed Nur	2 December 2002 (aged 15)	(Nigeria Football Federation) El-Kanemi Warriors
21	FW	Sunday Faleye	29 November 1998 (aged 19)	(Nigeria Football Federation) Shooting Stars
22	FW	Gabriel Okechukwu	26 August 1995 (aged 22)	(Nigeria Football Federation) Akwa United

=== Rwanda ===
Manager: (Germany) Antoine Hey

No.	Pos.	Player	Date of birth (age)	Club
1	GK	Eric Ndayishimiye	15 June 1988 (aged 29)	(Rwanda Football Federation) Rayon Sports
18	GK	Marcel Nzarora	22 November 1994 (aged 23)	(Rwanda Football Federation) Police FC
23	GK	Yves Kimenyi	13 October 1996 (aged 21)	(Rwanda Football Federation) APR
3	DF	Celestin Ndayishimiye	11 October 1994 (aged 23)	(Rwanda Football Federation) Police FC
9	DF	Ali Mbogo	14 November 1994 (aged 23)	(Rwanda Football Federation) Kiyovu Sports
13	DF	Fitina Omborenga	20 May 1996 (aged 21)	(Rwanda Football Federation) APR
14	DF	Eric Iradukunda	30 January 1992 (aged 25)	(Rwanda Football Federation) Kigali
15	DF	Faustin Usengimana	11 June 1994 (aged 23)	(Rwanda Football Federation) Rayon Sports
16	DF	Herve Rugwiro	21 December 1994 (aged 23)	(Rwanda Football Federation) APR
17	DF	Thierry Manzi	12 July 1996 (aged 21)	(Rwanda Football Federation) Rayon Sports
20	DF	Eric Rutanga	3 November 1992 (aged 25)	(Rwanda Football Federation) Rayon Sports
22	DF	Soter Kayumba	20 April 1993 (aged 24)	(Rwanda Football Federation) Kigali
2	MF	Djabel Manishimwe	10 May 1998 (aged 19)	(Rwanda Football Federation) Rayon Sports
4	MF	Djihad Bizimana	12 December 1996 (aged 21)	(Rwanda Football Federation) APR
5	MF	Amran Nshimiyimana	8 August 1988 (aged 29)	(Rwanda Football Federation) APR
6	MF	Yannick Mukunzi	2 October 1995 (aged 22)	(Rwanda Football Federation) Rayon Sports
8	MF	Ally Niyonzima	11 February 1996 (aged 21)	(Rwanda Football Federation) Kigali
10	MF	Muhadjiri Hakizimana	13 August 1994 (aged 23)	(Rwanda Football Federation) APR
7	FW	Abeddy Biramahire	4 October 1998 (aged 19)	(Rwanda Football Federation) Police FC
11	FW	Dominique Savio Nshuti	1 January 1997 (aged 21)	(Rwanda Football Federation) Kigali
12	FW	Justin Mico	21 December 1994 (aged 23)	(Rwanda Football Federation) Police FC
19	FW	Innocent Nshuti	31 January 1998 (aged 19)	(Rwanda Football Federation) APR
21	FW	Barnabé Mubumbyi	1 January 1992 (aged 26)	(Rwanda Football Federation) Bugesera

=== Equatorial Guinea ===
Coach: Rodolfo Bodipo

No.	Pos.	Player	Date of birth (age)	Caps	Goals	Club
1	GK	Miguel Eyama	8 July 1998 (aged 19)	1	0	(Equatoguinean Football Federation) Fundación Bata
2	DF	Miguel Ángel Mayé	8 October 1995 (aged 22)	1	0	(Equatoguinean Football Federation) Leones Vegetarianos
3	DF	Ernesto Montero	17 April 1998 (aged 19)	0	0	(Equatoguinean Football Federation) Deportivo Unidad
4	DF	Cosme Anvene (C)	3 March 1990 (aged 27)	2	0	(Equatoguinean Football Federation) Deportivo Unidad
5	DF	Santos Elá Abaga	28 January 1997 (aged 20)	0	0	(Equatoguinean Football Federation) Leones Vegetarianos
6	MF	Pío Eko	15 September 1998 (aged 19)	0	0	(Equatoguinean Football Federation) Cano Sport
7	MF	Saturnino Mustapha Iyanga	21 September 1993 (aged 24)	0	0	(Equatoguinean Football Federation) Recreativo Lampert
8	MF	Joaquín Obama	21 September 2000 (aged 17)	0	0	(Equatoguinean Football Federation) Leones Vegetarianos
9	FW	Emeterio Ekuaga	20 June 1991 (aged 26)	2	0	(Equatoguinean Football Federation) Atlético Semu
10	MF	Santiago Eneme Bocari	29 September 2000 (aged 17)	0	0	(Equatoguinean Football Federation) Cano Sport
11	MF	Basilio	17 January 1999 (aged 18)	3	0	(Equatoguinean Football Federation) Cano Sport
12	DF	Paulino Atom	14 September 1997 (aged 20)	0	0	(Equatoguinean Football Federation) Deportivo Unidad
13	GK	Pascasio Evea Ovono	22 February 1995 (aged 22)	0	0	(Equatoguinean Football Federation) Sony de Elá Nguema
14	DF	Miguel Ángel Nzang	27 July 1990 (aged 27)	1	0	(Equatoguinean Football Federation) Sony de Elá Nguema
15	MF	Marcos Nve	1 June 1993 (aged 24)	0	0	(Equatoguinean Football Federation) Racing de Micomeseng
16	DF	Jorge Akapo	21 November 1992 (aged 25)	0	0	(Equatoguinean Football Federation) Atlético Semu
17	FW	Pedro Oba	18 May 2000 (aged 17)	1	0	(Equatoguinean Football Federation) Futuro Mongomo
18	FW	Secundino Nsi Eyanga	14 February 2000 (aged 17)	0	0	(Equatoguinean Football Federation) Cano Sport
19	MF	Julio Edú	25 September 1992 (aged 25)	0	0	(Equatoguinean Football Federation) Sony de Elá Nguema
20	DF	Mariano Ondo Monsuy	29 June 1999 (aged 18)	1	0	(Equatoguinean Football Federation) Cano Sport
21	MF	Reginaldo Dalin	20 March 1999 (aged 18)	0	0	(Equatoguinean Football Federation) Cano Sport
22	GK	Pascual Elibiyo	17 August 1999 (aged 18)	0	0	(Equatoguinean Football Federation) Leones Vegetarianos
23	MF	Salvador Eworo	29 November 1998 (aged 19)	0	0	(Equatoguinean Football Federation) Cano Sport

== Group D ==
=== Angola ===
Manager: (Serbia) Srđan Vasiljević

No.	Pos.	Player	Date of birth (age)	Club
1	GK	Rui	1 May 1996 (aged 21)	(Angolan Football Federation) 1º de Maio
12	GK	Jota Be	30 October 1987 (aged 30)	(Angolan Football Federation) Interclube
22	GK	Landú	4 January 1990 (aged 28)	(Angolan Football Federation) Recreativo do Libolo
2	DF	Lito Kapunge	4 April 1996 (aged 21)	(Angolan Football Federation) Académica do Lobito
3	DF	Depaiza	22 February 1991 (aged 26)	(Angolan Football Federation) Recreativo do Libolo
4	DF	Nary	30 April 1987 (aged 30)	(Angolan Football Federation) Kabuscorp do Palanca
5	DF	Celson Barros	5 October 1986 (aged 31)	(Angolan Football Federation) Recreativo do Libolo
6	DF	Mira	12 February 1991 (aged 26)	(Angolan Football Federation) Petro Atlético de Luanda
15	DF	Wilson	29 September 1990 (aged 27)	(Angolan Football Federation) Petro Atlético de Luanda
16	DF	Tó Carneiro	5 November 1995 (aged 22)	(Angolan Football Federation) Interclube
21	DF	Meda	19 April 1998 (aged 19)	(Angolan Football Federation) Real Sambila
7	MF	Almeida	20 May 1993 (aged 24)	(Angolan Football Federation) Progresso do Sambizanga
10	MF	Manguxi	27 November 1991 (aged 26)	(Angolan Football Federation) Petro Atlético de Luanda
14	MF	Paty	29 April 1991 (aged 26)	(Angolan Football Federation) Interclube
17	MF	Chiló	23 December 1990 (aged 27)	(Angolan Football Federation) Académica do Lobito
18	MF	Herenilson	23 May 1996 (aged 21)	(Angolan Football Federation) Petro Atlético de Luanda
20	MF	Gui	1 August 1993 (aged 24)	(Angolan Football Federation) ASA
8	FW	Mano	4 August 1989 (aged 28)	(Angolan Football Federation) Interclube
9	FW	Fofó	30 June 1994 (aged 23)	(Angolan Football Federation) Progresso do Sambizanga
11	FW	Job	27 September 1987 (aged 30)	(Angolan Football Federation) Petro Atlético de Luanda
13	FW	Vá	24 August 1998 (aged 19)	(Angolan Football Federation) Progresso do Sambizanga
19	FW	Moco	9 May 1989 (aged 28)	(Angolan Football Federation) Interclube
23	FW	Kaporal	16 May 1994 (aged 23)	(Angolan Football Federation) 1º de Maio

=== Cameroon ===
Manager: Rigobert Song

No.	Pos.	Player	Date of birth (age)	Club
1	GK	Jean Oscar Gwot	2 August 1985 (aged 32)	(Cameroonian Football Federation) Eding Sport
16	GK	Anye Fru	26 June 1995 (aged 22)	(Cameroonian Football Federation) Union Douala
23	GK	Omossola Medjo	5 May 1998 (aged 19)	(Cameroonian Football Federation) Coton Sport
2	DF	Bertrand Owundi	15 October 1993 (aged 24)	(Cameroonian Football Federation) Astres
3	DF	Fabril Kaou	24 August 1993 (aged 24)	(Cameroonian Football Federation) Coton Sport
4	DF	Bawak Etta	10 July 1994 (aged 23)	(Cameroonian Football Federation) UMS de Loum
5	DF	Alphonse Tientcheu	4 September 1989 (aged 28)	(Cameroonian Football Federation) Eding Sport
6	DF	Paul Otia	4 April 1996 (aged 21)	(Cameroonian Football Federation) UMS de Loum
7	DF	Salomon Banga	19 January 1996 (aged 21)	(Cameroonian Football Federation) Colombe Sportive
15	DF	Paul Abouem	29 January 1990 (aged 27)	(Cameroonian Football Federation) UMS de Loum
21	DF	Serge Andoulo	8 January 1995 (aged 23)	(Cameroonian Football Federation) New Star
9	MF	David Eto'o	13 June 1987 (aged 30)	(Cameroonian Football Federation) Union Douala
10	MF	Clarence Bitang	2 September 1992 (aged 25)	(Cameroonian Football Federation) Union Douala
11	MF	Willy Namedji	4 April 1989 (aged 28)	(Cameroonian Football Federation) UMS de Loum
14	MF	Black Ngoundo	24 February 1996 (aged 21)	(Cameroonian Football Federation) New Star
17	MF	Frankline Anteh	22 June 1996 (aged 21)	(Cameroonian Football Federation) Unisport
18	MF	Junior Awono	20 November 1994 (aged 23)	(Cameroonian Football Federation) Yong Sports Academy
8	FW	Patrick Moussombo	2 March 1995 (aged 22)	(Cameroonian Football Federation) Colombe Sportive
12	FW	Francis Ebembe	14 May 1995 (aged 22)	(Cameroonian Football Federation) Aigle Royal Menoua
13	FW	Aristide Touffic	19 August 1993 (aged 24)	(Cameroonian Football Federation) Eding Sport
19	FW	Raphaël Messi Bouli	28 April 1992 (aged 25)	(Cameroonian Football Federation) APEJES
20	FW	Frantz Pangop	18 May 1993 (aged 24)	(Cameroonian Football Federation) Union Douala
22	FW	Herve Elame	10 August 1999 (aged 18)	(Cameroonian Football Federation) Dragon Club

=== Congo ===
Manager: Barthélémy Ngatsono

No.	Pos.	Player	Date of birth (age)	Club
1	GK	Barel Mouko	5 April 1979 (aged 38)	(Congolese Football Federation) Flamengo
16	GK	Pavelh Ndzila	12 January 1995 (aged 23)	(Congolese Football Federation) Étoile du Congo
22	GK	Perrauld Ndinga	8 May 1999 (aged 18)	(Congolese Football Federation) Patronage Sainte-Anne
2	DF	Faria Ondongo	19 June 1996 (aged 21)	(Congolese Football Federation) AS Otôho
3	DF	Béranger Itoua	9 May 1992 (aged 25)	(Congolese Football Federation) AS Otôho
4	DF	Baron Kibamba	23 March 1998 (aged 19)	(Congolese Football Federation) AS Otôho
5	DF	Carof Bakoua	9 September 1993 (aged 24)	(Congolese Football Federation) Diables Noirs
6	DF	Dimitri Bissiki	17 March 1991 (aged 26)	(Congolese Football Federation) Léopards
15	DF	Varel Rozan	9 September 1994 (aged 23)	(Congolese Football Federation) Diables Noirs
17	DF	Samy Mampembe	2 April 1998 (aged 19)	(Congolese Football Federation) Léopards
21	DF	Julfin Ondongo	28 March 1997 (aged 20)	(Congolese Football Federation) AS Otôho
8	MF	Amour Loussoukou	5 December 1996 (aged 21)	(Congolese Football Federation) Diables Noirs
14	MF	Césaire Gandzé	6 March 1989 (aged 28)	(Congolese Football Federation) Léopards
18	MF	Prestone Lakolo	13 April 1989 (aged 28)	(Congolese Football Federation) Léopards
19	MF	Chardin Madila	15 April 1990 (aged 27)	(Congolese Football Federation) Léopards
23	MF	Fred Ngoma	24 November 1997 (aged 20)	(Congolese Football Federation) La Mancha
7	FW	Matheus Botamba	14 January 1993 (aged 24)	(Congolese Football Federation) AS Otôho
9	FW	Bersyl Obassi	29 March 1996 (aged 21)	(Congolese Football Federation) AS Otôho
10	FW	Moise Nkounkou	2 August 1996 (aged 21)	(Congolese Football Federation) Diables Noirs
11	FW	Prestige Mboungou	10 July 2000 (aged 17)	(Congolese Football Federation) Diables Noirs
12	FW	Junior Makiesse	12 June 1993 (aged 24)	(Congolese Football Federation) Léopards
13	FW	Jaures Ngombe	22 May 1998 (aged 19)	(Congolese Football Federation) AS Otôho
20	FW	Kader Bidimbou	20 February 1996 (aged 21)	(Congolese Football Federation) Diables Noirs

=== Burkina Faso ===
Manager: Idrissa Malo Traoré

No.	Pos.	Player	Date of birth (age)	Club
1	GK	Adama Sawadogo	20 January 1990 (aged 27)	(Burkinabé Football Federation) Salitas
16	GK	Aboubacar Sawadogo	10 August 1989 (aged 28)	(Burkinabé Football Federation) RC Kadiogo
23	GK	Harouna Balbone	30 December 1989 (aged 28)	(Burkinabé Football Federation) USFA
2	DF	Eliseé Sou	21 October 1999 (aged 18)	(Burkinabé Football Federation) Rahimo
3	DF	Valentin Nouma	14 February 2000 (aged 17)	(Burkinabé Football Federation) Rahimo
5	DF	Fousseyni Béao	31 December 1993 (aged 24)	(Burkinabé Football Federation) EFO
6	DF	Maxime Ouattara	10 June 1995 (aged 22)	(Burkinabé Football Federation) Salitas
13	DF	Moussa Sory	20 May 1988 (aged 29)	(Burkinabé Football Federation) AJEB
14	DF	Yaya Sanou	29 December 1993 (aged 24)	(Burkinabé Football Federation) ASFB
15	DF	Séverin Traoré	25 January 1994 (aged 23)	(Burkinabé Football Federation) SONABEL
22	DF	Somgogma Nikiema	30 November 1988 (aged 29)	(Burkinabé Football Federation) USO
8	MF	Issouf Kaboré	4 October 1985 (aged 32)	(Burkinabé Football Federation) ASFA Yennenga
10	MF	Mohamed Sydney Sylla	27 December 1996 (aged 21)	(Burkinabé Football Federation) Salitas
11	MF	Ouedan Abem	12 August 1995 (aged 22)	(Burkinabé Football Federation) RC Kadiogo
12	MF	Abdoul Abass Guiro	19 October 1994 (aged 23)	(Burkinabé Football Federation) EFO
17	MF	Arnaud Bande	8 October 1993 (aged 24)	(Burkinabé Football Federation) USO
18	MF	Adama Barro	3 September 1996 (aged 21)	(Burkinabé Football Federation) Rahimo
19	MF	Wend-Panga Bambara	12 September 1996 (aged 21)	(Burkinabé Football Federation) USFA
4	FW	Djibril Ouattara	19 September 1999 (aged 18)	(Burkinabé Football Federation) ASFB
7	FW	Moïse Zongo	10 March 1996 (aged 21)	(Burkinabé Football Federation) Salitas
9	FW	Romeo Boni	7 February 1990 (aged 27)	(Burkinabé Football Federation) AS Police
20	FW	Nathanio Kompaoré	20 June 2001 (aged 16)	(Burkinabé Football Federation) Salitas
21	FW	Ousmane Siry	30 May 1991 (aged 26)	(Burkinabé Football Federation) Rahimo
