= 2008 Volta de Ciclismo Internacional do Estado de São Paulo =

2008 Volta de São Paulo
- Volta de São Paulo 2008 – Stage Outline

Race details
- Dates: April 20–April 27, 2008
- Stages: 9
- Distance: 1,048 km (651 mi)
- Winning time: 24h 43' 17"

Results
	Winner	Gregolry Panizo (Brazil)	(Dataro-Blumenau)
	Second	Luiz Amorim Tavares (Brazil)	(CESC-Sundown)
	Third	Jair Santos (Brazil)	(Avaí-Florianópolis)
	Points	Edgardo Simón (Argentina)	(Scott-SJC)
	Mountains	Marcelo Moser (Brazil)	(Avaí-Florianópolis)
	Team	(Brazil) Avaí-Florianópolis	

The 2008 Volta de Ciclismo Internacional do Estado de São Paulo (Portuguese for International Cycling Tour of the State of São Paulo) is the 5th edition of a multi-day road cycling stage race held in the state of São Paulo. This edition features 9 stages over 1048 km, disputed from April 20 to 27, 2008. The race is a 2.2 event in the 2007–2008 UCI America Tour.

== Classification and Bonuses ==
In this edition of the race, time bonuses of 10, 6 and 4 seconds are awarded to the top 3 riders in each stage. Time bonuses of 3, 2 and 1 seconds are awarded to the first 3 riders at each intermediary sprint point. For the points classification, the top 5 riders in each stage are awarded 10, 7, 5, 3 and 2 points, respectively. The first 3 riders at each intermediary sprint receive 5, 3 and 2 points. Climbs are classified among 4 categories. The first 3 riders at each summit are awarded points in the mountains classification according to the category:

- Category 1: 11, 9, 8 pts
- Category 2: 9, 7, 6 pts
- Category 3: 7, 5, 4 pts
- Category 4: 5, 3, 2 pts

The team classification accounts the times of the first 3 riders of each team in each stage.

== Stages and Results ==
=== Stage 1: São Paulo ===
Held Sunday, April 20, 2008, in Autódromo José Carlos Pace. This stage featured 20 laps in the racing circuit, for a total distance of 85.84 km. A field of 94 riders finished with the same time of the stage winner, Edgardo Simón.

Stage 1 Result

	Nation	Cyclist	Team	Time
1	(Argentina)	Edgardo Simón	SCF	1h58'29"
2	(Uruguay)	Alvaro Tardáguila	Uruguay	s.t.
3	(Brazil)	Alex Diniz	SCF	s.t.

General Classification after Stage 1

	Nation	Cyclist	Team	Time
1	(Argentina)	Edgardo Simón	SCF	1h58'19"
2	(Uruguay)	Alvaro Tardáguila	Uruguay	+0'04"
3	(Brazil)	Alex Diniz	SCF	+0'06"

Points Classification after Stage 1

	Nation	Cyclist	Team	Points
1	(Argentina)	Edgardo Simón	SCF	10 pts
2	(Brazil)	Alcides Vieira	Dataro	10 pts
3	(Uruguay)	Alvaro Tardáguila	Uruguay	7 pts

Mountain Classification after Stage 1

	Nation	Cyclist	Team	Points
1	(Brazil)	Alex Diniz	SCF	5 pts
2	(Brazil)	Renato Santos	Dataro	5 pts
3	(Brazil)	Jean Coloca	Metodista-SBC	3 pts

=== Stage 2: Sorocaba to São Carlos ===
Held Monday, April 21, 2008. This stage was 230.2 km long. A field of 76 riders finished with the same time of the stage winner, Edgardo Simón.

Stage 2 Result

	Nation	Cyclist	Team	Time
1	(Argentina)	Edgardo Simón	SCF	5h43'17"
2	(Argentina)	Francisco Chamorro	CESC-Sundown	s.t.
3	(Brazil)	Kléber Ramos	Suzano-Flying Horse	s.t.

General Classification after Stage 2

	Nation	Cyclist	Team	Time
1	(Argentina)	Edgardo Simón	SCF	7h41'24"
2	(Argentina)	Francisco Chamorro	CESC-Sundown	+0'15"
3	(Uruguay)	Alvaro Tardáguila	Uruguay	+0'16"

Points Classification after Stage 2

	Nation	Cyclist	Team	Points
1	(Argentina)	Edgardo Simón	SCF	23 pts
2	(Brazil)	Alcides Vieira	Dataro	10 pts
3	(Argentina)	Francisco Chamorro	CESC-Sundown	9 pts

Mountain Classification after Stage 2

	Nation	Cyclist	Team	Points
1	(Brazil)	Marcelo Moser	Avaí-Florianópolis	9 pts
2	(Brazil)	Jean Coloca	Metodista-SBC	8 pts
3	(Brazil)	Renato Santos	Dataro	7 pts

=== Stage 3: São Carlos time trial ===
Held Tuesday, April 22, 2008. This stage was an 11.3 km individual time trial along the streets of São Carlos.

Stage 3 Result

	Nation	Cyclist	Team	Time
1	(Brazil)	Luiz Amorim Tavares	CESC-Sundown	14'39"
2	(Brazil)	Magno Prado Nazaret	SCF	14'42"
3	(Brazil)	Gregolry Panizo	Dataro	14'45"

General Classification after Stage 3

	Nation	Cyclist	Team	Time
1	(Brazil)	Luiz Amorim Tavares	CESC-Sundown	7h56'25"
2	(Brazil)	Magno Prado Nazaret	SCF	+0'03"
3	(Brazil)	Gregolry Panizo	Dataro	+0'06"

Points Classification after Stage 3

	Nation	Cyclist	Team	Points
1	(Argentina)	Edgardo Simón	SCF	23 pts
2	(Brazil)	Luiz Amorim Tavares	CESC-Sundown	10 pts
3	(Brazil)	Alcides Vieira	Dataro	10 pts

Mountain Classification after Stage 3

	Nation	Cyclist	Team	Points
1	(Brazil)	Marcelo Moser	Avaí-Florianópolis	9 pts
2	(Brazil)	Jean Coloca	Metodista-SBC	8 pts
3	(Brazil)	Renato Santos	Dataro	7 pts

=== Stage 4: São Carlos to Ribeirão Preto ===
Held Tuesday, April 22, 2008. This stage was 93.2 km long, and was held in the afternoon, a few hours after Stage 3. A field of 95 riders finished with the same time of the stage winner, Edgardo Simón.

Stage 4 Result

	Nation	Cyclist	Team	Time
1	(Argentina)	Edgardo Simón	SCF	2h18'11"
2	(Argentina)	Francisco Chamorro	CESC-Sundown	s.t.
3	(Brazil)	Bruno Tabanez	SLS-Americana	s.t.

General Classification after Stage 4

	Nation	Cyclist	Team	Time
1	(Brazil)	Luiz Amorim Tavares	CESC-Sundown	10h14'36"
2	(Brazil)	Magno Prado Nazaret	SCF	+0'03"
3	(Brazil)	Gregolry Panizo	Dataro	+0'06"

Points Classification after Stage 4

	Nation	Cyclist	Team	Points
1	(Argentina)	Edgardo Simón	SCF	33 pts
2	(Argentina)	Francisco Chamorro	CESC-Sundown	16 pts
3	(Brazil)	Luiz Amorim Tavares	CESC-Sundown	10 pts

Mountain Classification after Stage 4

	Nation	Cyclist	Team	Points
1	(Brazil)	Marcelo Moser	Avaí-Florianópolis	9 pts
2	(Brazil)	Jean Coloca	Metodista-SBC	8 pts
3	(Brazil)	Renato Santos	Dataro	7 pts

=== Stage 5: Cajuru to Campinas ===
Held Wednesday, April 23, 2008. This stage was 199.0 km long. A group of 8 riders finished with the same time of the stage winner, Otávio Bulgarelli.

Stage 5 Result

	Nation	Cyclist	Team	Time
1	(Brazil)	Otávio Bulgarelli	Suzano-Flying Horse	4h39'55"
2	(Brazil)	Gregolry Panizo	Dataro	s.t.
3	(Brazil)	Bruno Pereira	SLS-Americana	s.t.

General Classification after Stage 5

	Nation	Cyclist	Team	Time
1	(Brazil)	Gregolry Panizo	Dataro	14h54'31"
2	(Brazil)	Magno Prado Nazaret	SCF	+0'03"
3	(Brazil)	Luiz Amorim Tavares	CESC-Sundown	+0'15"

Points Classification after Stage 5

	Nation	Cyclist	Team	Points
1	(Argentina)	Edgardo Simón	SCF	33 pts
2	(Argentina)	Francisco Chamorro	CESC-Sundown	18 pts
3	(Brazil)	Gregolry Panizo	CESC-Sundown	12 pts

Mountain Classification after Stage 5

	Nation	Cyclist	Team	Points
1	(Brazil)	Marcelo Moser	Avaí-Florianópolis	12 pts
2	(Brazil)	Cleberson Weber	Dataro	10 pts
3	(Chile)	Marco Arriagada	Juarez-México	9 pts

=== Stage 6: Campinas to Atibaia ===
Held Thursday, April 24, 2008. This stage was 193.0 km long.

Stage 6 Result

	Nation	Cyclist	Team	Time
1	(Brazil)	Diego Portugal	CESC-Sundown	4h29'36"
2	(Brazil)	Fábio Ribeiro	DET-Cordeirópolis	+0'37"
3	(Brazil)	Bruno Pereira	SLS-Americana	+0'44"

General Classification after Stage 6

	Nation	Cyclist	Team	Time
1	(Brazil)	Gregolry Panizo	Dataro	19h24'59"
2	(Brazil)	Magno Prado Nazaret	SCF	+0'03"
3	(Brazil)	Luiz Amorim Tavares	CESC-Sundown	+0'15"

Points Classification after Stage 6

	Nation	Cyclist	Team	Points
1	(Argentina)	Edgardo Simón	SCF	33 pts
2	(Argentina)	Francisco Chamorro	CESC-Sundown	18 pts
3	(Brazil)	Alcides Vieira	Dataro	13 pts

Mountain Classification after Stage 6

	Nation	Cyclist	Team	Points
1	(Brazil)	Diego Portugal	CESC-Sundown	13 pts
2	(Brazil)	Bruno Pereira	SLS-Americana	13 pts
3	(Brazil)	Marcelo Moser	Avaí-Florianópolis	12 pts

=== Stage 7: Atibaia to São José dos Campos ===
Held Friday, April 25, 2008. This stage was 105.6 km long, and a field of 102 riders finished with the same time of the stage winner, Francisco Chamorro.

Stage 7 Result

	Nation	Cyclist	Team	Time
1	(Argentina)	Francisco Chamorro	CESC-Sundown	2h14'09"
2	(Brazil)	Kléber Ramos	Suzano-Flying Horse	s.t.
3	(Argentina)	Armando Borrajo	Chivilcoy-Argentina	s.t.

General Classification after Stage 7

	Nation	Cyclist	Team	Time
1	(Brazil)	Gregolry Panizo	Dataro	21h39'06"
2	(Brazil)	Magno Prado Nazaret	SCF	+0'05"
3	(Brazil)	Luiz Amorim Tavares	CESC-Sundown	+0'17"

Points Classification after Stage 7

	Nation	Cyclist	Team	Points
1	(Argentina)	Edgardo Simón	SCF	37 pts
2	(Argentina)	Francisco Chamorro	CESC-Sundown	33 pts
3	(Brazil)	Gregolry Panizo	Dataro	15 pts

Mountain Classification after Stage 7

	Nation	Cyclist	Team	Points
1	(Brazil)	Marcelo Moser	Avaí-FLorianópolis	22 pts
2	(Brazil)	Diego Portugal	CESC-Sundown	13 pts
3	(Brazil)	Bruno Pereira	SLS-Americana	13 pts

=== Stage 8: São José dos Campos to Campos do Jordão ===
Held Saturday, April 26, 2008. This mountain stage was 79 km long.

Stage 8 Result

	Nation	Cyclist	Team	Time
1	(Brazil)	Jair Santos	Avaí-Florianópolis	2h07'53"
2	(Brazil)	Marcelo Moser	Avaí-Florianópolis	+0'10"
3	(Brazil)	Gregolry Panizo	Dataro	+0'12"

General Classification after Stage 8

	Nation	Cyclist	Team	Time
1	(Brazil)	Gregolry Panizo	Dataro	23h47'07"
2	(Brazil)	Luiz Amorim Tavares	CESC-Sundown	+0'23"
3	(Brazil)	Magno Prado Nazaret	SCF	+0'23"

Points Classification after Stage 8

	Nation	Cyclist	Team	Points
1	(Argentina)	Edgardo Simón	SCF	37 pts
2	(Argentina)	Francisco Chamorro	CESC-Sundown	33 pts
3	(Brazil)	Gregolry Panizo	Dataro	20 pts

Mountain Classification after Stage 8

	Nation	Cyclist	Team	Points
1	(Brazil)	Marcelo Moser	Avaí-FLorianópolis	31 pts
2	(Brazil)	Diego Portugal	CESC-Sundown	13 pts
3	(Brazil)	Bruno Pereira	SLS-Americana	13 pts

=== Stage 9: Jundiaí to São Paulo ===
Held Sunday, April 27, 2008. This stage was 51.5 km long.

Stage 9 Result

	Nation	Cyclist	Team	Time
1	(Brazil)	Gilberto Goes	Sales-BH	56'14"
2	(Brazil)	Antônio Nascimento	Memorial-Santos	s.t.
3	(Brazil)	Gregolry Panizo	Dataro	s.t.

== Final results ==
General Classification after Stage 9 (Final results)

	Nation	Cyclist	Team	Time
1	(Brazil)	Gregolry Panizo	Dataro	24h43'17"
2	(Brazil)	Luiz Amorim Tavares	CESC-Sundown	+0'27"
3	(Brazil)	Jair Santos	Avaí-Florianópolis	+0'51"
4	(Brazil)	Magno Prado Nazaret	SCF	+1'34"
5	(Brazil)	Otávio BUlgarelli	Suzano-Flying Horse	+1'36"
6	(Brazil)	Antônio Nascimento	Memorial-Santos	+1'41"
7	(Brazil)	Marcelo Moser	Avaí-Florianópolis	+1'59"
8	(Brazil)	Rafael Gerhard	Avaí-Florianópolis	+2'30"
9	(Brazil)	Renato Seabra	SCF	+2'31"
10	(Brazil)	José Medeiros	União-Assis	+2'33"

Points Classification after Stage 9 (Final results)

	Nation	Cyclist	Team	Points
1	(Argentina)	Edgardo Simón	SCF	40 pts
2	(Argentina)	Francisco Chamorro	CESC-Sundown	38 pts
3	(Brazil)	Gregolry Panizo	Dataro	25 pts

Mountain Classification after Stage 9 (Final results)

	Nation	Cyclist	Team	Points
1	(Brazil)	Marcelo Moser	Avaí-Florianópolis	34 pts
2	(Brazil)	Diego Portugal	CESC-Sundown	18 pts
3	(Brazil)	Patrique Azevedo	Suzano-Flying Horse	14 pts

Team Classification after Stage 9 (Final results)

	Nation	Team	Time
1	(Brazil)	Avaí-Florianópolis	74h14'13"
2	(Brazil)	SCF	+1'26"
3	(Brazil)	Dataro	+1'51"

== Participating teams and riders ==
UCI Continental teams

- (Brazil) SCF – Scott–Marcondes Cesar–São José dos Campos

10 – (Brazil) Magno Prado Nazaret
11 – (Brazil) Pedro Autran Nicácio
12 – (Brazil) Breno Sidoti
13 – (Brazil) Maurício Morandi
14 – (Brazil) Fabrício Morandi
15 – (Brazil) Renato Seabra
16 – (Brazil) Alex Diniz
17 – (Argentina) Edgardo Simón

National teams

- Uruguay – Uruguay National Team

190 – (Uruguay) Richard Mascarañas
191 – (Uruguay) Jorge Bravo
192 – (Uruguay) Alvaro Tardáguila
193 – (Uruguay) Gonzalo Tagliabúe
194 – (Uruguay) Cristian Villanueva
195 – (Uruguay) José Miraglia
196 – (Uruguay) Geovane Fernández
197 – (Uruguay) Fredy Peralta

Regional teams

- (Argentina) ACME – ACME Cycling Team

140 – (Argentina) Maurício Frazer
141 – (Argentina) Javier Lindner
142 – (Argentina) Jesus Patalagoytia
143 – (Guatemala) Lisandro Ajcu
144 – (Argentina) Adolfo Trabochi
145 – (Guatemala) Luis Marroquin
146 – (Canada) Gabriel Epstein

- (Brazil) Avaí-Florianópolis – Avaí/Florianópolis/APGF

80 – (Brazil) Jair Santos
81 – (Brazil) Marcelo Moser
82 – (Uruguay) Ramiro Gonzales
83 – (Brazil) Rafael Gerhard
84 – (Brazil) Rafael Silva
85 – (Brazil) Edson Resende
86 – (Brazil) Gustavo Zorzo
87 – (Brazil) Flávio Reblin

- (Brazil) CESC-Sundown – CESC/Sundown/Nossa Caixa/Calipso/Maxxis

30 – (Brazil) Luiz Amorim Tavares
31 – (Brazil) Rogério Silva
32 – (Brazil) Walter Ribeiro Jr.
33 – (Argentina) Francisco Chamorro
34 – (Brazil) Raul Cançado
35 – (Brazil) Edson Corradi
36 – (Brazil) Elivelton Pedro
37 – (Brazil) Diego Portugal

- Chivilcoy-Argentina – Ciudad de Chivilcoy

180 – (Argentina) Emilio Martin
181 – (Argentina) Fernando Antogna
182 – (Argentina) Gustavo Toledo
183 – (Argentina) Armando Borrajo
184 – (Argentina) César Sigura
185 – (Argentina) Pedro Prieto

- (Brazil) Dataro – Clube Dataro de Ciclismo/Blumenau

40 – (Brazil) Alcides Vieira
41 – (Brazil) Cleberson Weber
42 – (Brazil) Gregolry Panizo
43 – (Brazil) Jocielmo Marins
44 – (Brazil) Renato Santos
45 – (Brazil) Eduardo Pereira
46 – (Brazil) Carlos França
47 – (Brazil) Sidnei Silva

- (Brazil) DET-Cordeirópolis – DET Cordeirópolis/Kuruma/Incefra/Unilance

110 – (Brazil) Andrio Lima
111 – (Brazil) Fábio Ribeiro
112 – (Brazil) Hernandes Cuadri
113 – (Brazil) Marcelo Soares
114 – (Brazil) Elinton Stocco
115 – (Brazil) Leonardo Lima
116 – (Brazil) Glauber Nascimento
117 – (Brazil) André Souza

- Gob.Zulia – Venezuela/Gob.Zulia/Alcadia de Cabimas

170 – (Venezuela) Manuel Medina
171 – (Venezuela) Víctor Moreno
172 – (Venezuela) Adelso Valero
173 – (Venezuela) Franklin Chacón
174 – (Venezuela) José Contreras
175 – (Venezuela) Hebert Rivas

- (Mexico) Juarez-México – Municipalidad de Juarez – México

150 – (Mexico) Fidel Goytia
151 – (Mexico) Jessiel Valenzuela
152 – (Mexico) Ricardo Tapia
153 – (Mexico) Javier Pérez
154 – (Chile) Marco Arriagada
155 – (Mexico) Ismael Ponce

- (Brazil) Memorial-Santos – Memorial/PM Santos/Giant/Nossa Caixa

1 – (Brazil) Marcos Novello
2 – (Brazil) Antônio Nascimento
3 – (Brazil) André Pulini
4 – (Brazil) Thiago Nardin
5 – (Brazil) Eduardo Pinheiro
6 – (Brazil) Robson Dias
7 – (Brazil) Patrick Oyakaua
8 – (Brazil) Armando Camargo

- (Brazil) Metodista-SBC – Metodista/São Bernardo do Campo/Sundown/Nossa Caixa

70 – (Brazil) Adriano Martins
71 – (Brazil) Alexandre Mantovani
72 – (Brazil) Jerre Souza
73 – (Brazil) Jeovane Oliveira
74 – (Brazil) Wilian Rodrigues
75 – (Brazil) Marcelo Simeoni
76 – (Brazil) Jean Coloca
77 – (Brazil) João Paulo Vieira

- (Brazil) Sales-BH – Sales Supermercados/Pinarello/BH

20 – (Uruguay) Miguel Direnna
21 – (Brazil) Márcio Pinto
22 – (Brazil) Roger Ferraro
23 – (Brazil) Valcemar Justino
24 – (Brazil) Vanderlei Melchior
25 – (Brazil) Renato Rohsler
26 – (Brazil) Fabiele Mota
27 – (Brazil) Gilberto Goes

- (Brazil) Sel.Paulista – Seleção Paulista

130 – (Brazil) Jean Silva
131 – (Brazil) Gideoni Monteiro
132 – (Brazil) Valmir Baia
133 – (Brazil) José Cláudio Santos
134 – (Brazil) Carlos Santos
135 – (Brazil) Alberto Camera

- (Brazil) SF-Kenda – São Francisco/Kenda/Nossa Caixa/DKS/Ribeirão Preto

60 – (Cuba) Michel García
61 – (Brazil) Murilo Costa
62 – (Brazil) Rodrigo Melo
63 – (Brazil) Anderson Echeverria
64 – (Brazil) Humberto Vale
65 – (Brazil) Juliano Silva
66 – (Brazil) José Jailson Diniz
67 – (Brazil) Daniel Amaral

- (Brazil) SLS-Americana – São Lucas Saúde/UCA/Americana

120 – (Brazil) Anderson Oliveira
121 – (Brazil) Bruno Pereira
122 – (Brazil) Bruno Tabanez
123 – (Brazil) Geraldo Santos
124 – (Brazil) José Júnior Diniz
125 – (Brazil) Luciano Silva

- (Brazil) Suzano-Flying Horse – Suzano/Flying Horse/Caloi

90 – (Brazil) Alex Arseno
91 – (Brazil) Douglas Bueno
92 – (Brazil) Kléber Ramos
93 – (Brazil) Léo Ferréira
94 – (Brazil) Otávio Bulgarelli
95 – (Brazil) Patrique Azevedo
96 – (Brazil) Renato Ruiz
97 – (Brazil) Tiago Fiorilli

- (Brazil) Team Vale – Team Vale/FAPI/O Lojão/Gramado/JKS/Sejelp

100 – (Brazil) Ezequiel Riderson
101 – (Brazil) Flávio Cardoso
102 – (Brazil) Raphael Serpa
103 – (Brazil) Roberto Pinheiro
104 – (Brazil) Fabiano Mota
105 – (Brazil) Fábio Fagundes
106 – (Brazil) Fernando Tomaz
107 – (Brazil) Marcos Pereira Jr.

- (Brazil) União-Assis – União/Assis-Amea

50 – (Brazil) Alan Maniezzo
51 – (Brazil) Justino Ribeiro
52 – (Brazil) Diego Domingues
53 – (Brazil) José Medeiros
54 – (Brazil) Ruy Sá Neto
55 – (Brazil) Josias Silva
56 – (Brazil) Elton Marroni
57 – (Brazil) Rodrigo Cheles
