= Mbogo (surname) =

Mbogo is a surname. Notable people with the surname include:

- Ally Mbogo (born 1994), Rwandan footballer
- Jael Mbogo (born 1939), Kenyan social worker
- Patrick Kinyua Mbogo (born 1982), Kenyan badminton player
- Rachael Mbogo (born 1982), Kenyan rugby sevens player
- Richard Mbogo (born 1973), Tanzanian politician
- Taska Mbogo (born 1960), Tanzanian politician
- Nuhu Mbogo Kyabasinga (1835–1921), prince of the Buganda Kingdom
- Peter Mbogo Njiru, Kenyan military officer
