= Jorge Mosera =

Equatoguinean footballer (born 2002)

Personal information
- Full name: Jorge Mosera Sipaco
- Date of birth: 28 May 2002 (age 24)
- Place of birth: Malabo, Equatorial Guinea
- Position: Defender

Team information
- Current team: Cano Sport
- Number: 18

Senior career*
| Years | Team | Apps | (Gls) |
| –2018 | Real X | | |
| 2019– | Cano Sport | | |

International career^{‡}
| 2018 | Equatorial Guinea U17 | | |
| 2019– | Equatorial Guinea | 1 | (0) |
- * Club domestic league appearances and goals ‡ National team caps and goals as of 28 July 2019

Jorge Mosera Sipaco (born 28 May 2002) is an Equatorial Guinean footballer who plays as a defender for Cano Sport Academy and the Equatorial Guinea national team.

== Club career ==
Mosera moved from Real X Balompié to Cano Sport in January 2019.

== International career ==
Mosera made his international debut for Equatorial Guinea on 28 July 2019.
