= Salvador Eworo =

Equatoguinean international footballer

Personal information
- Full name: Salvador Eworo Alene Asama
- Date of birth: 29 November 1998 (age 27)
- Position: Midfielder

Team information
- Current team: Los Yébenes San Bruno

Youth career
- Cano Sport Academy

Senior career*
Years	Team	Apps	(Gls)
2017–2018	Cano Sport Academy		
2018–2019	Cieza B	14	(1)
2018–2019	Cieza	11	(0)
2019–	Los Yébenes San Bruno	0	(0)

International career^{‡}
2019	Equatorial Guinea U23	2	(0)
2018	Equatorial Guinea	3	(0)
- * Club domestic league appearances and goals as of 23 December 2018 ‡ National team caps and goals as of 26 March 2019

Salvador Eworo Alene Asama (born 29 November 1998) is an Equatoguinean international footballer who plays for Spanish club CD Los Yébenes San Bruno, as a midfielder.

== Career ==
He has played club football for Cano Sport Academy.

He made his international debut for Equatorial Guinea in 2018.
