= Pío Eko =

Equatoguinean footballer (born 1998)

Personal information
- Full name: Pío Eko Ndong Obela
- Date of birth: 15 September 1998 (age 28)
- Place of birth: Kogo, Equatorial Guinea
- Height: 1.65 m (5 ft 5 in)
- Positions: Defender; midfielder

Youth career
- 2014–2017: Cano Sport Academy

Senior career*
Years	Team	Apps	(Gls)
2017–2018	Cano Sport		
2018–2019	Cieza B	17	(2)
2018–2019	Cieza	11	(0)
2019	Alcorcón C	1	(0)
2019–2020	Los Yébenes San Bruno	6	(0)
2021	Alcorisa	12	(0)
2023	Calanda	2	(0)

International career^{‡}
2019	Equatorial Guinea U23	2	(0)
2018	Equatorial Guinea	2	(0)
- * Club domestic league appearances and goals as of 14 May 2023 ‡ National team caps and goals as of 26 March 2019

Pío Eko Ndong Obela (born 15 September 1998) is an Equatorial Guinean footballer who plays as a defender. He capped for the Equatorial Guinea national team.

== Club career ==
Eko is a Cano Sport Academy product.

== International career ==
Eko made his international debut for Equatorial Guinea in 2018.
