= Kasule =

Kasule is a given name and a surname. It may refer to:

== Given name ==
- Kasule Owen (born 1989), Ugandan footballer

== Surname ==
- Abubakar Kasule, Ugandan footballer
- Justine Lumumba Kasule, Ugandan educator and politician
- Kizito Maria Kasule (born 1967), Ugandan artist and entrepreneur
- Noah Babadi Kasule (born 1985), Ugandan footballer
- Peninnah Kasule, Ugandan lawyer and corporate executive
- Remmy Kasule (born 1949), Ugandan lawyer and judge
- Vic Kasule (born 1965), Scottish footballer of Ugandan descent
