= Siry =

Siry may refer to:

- Staten Island Railway
- Siry-ziroudani, a village on the island of Mohéli in the Comoros
- Siry, a surname:
  - Emerencia Siry-Király (born 1948), Hungarian volleyball player
  - Joseph Siry, American architectural historian
  - Ousmane Siry (born 1991), Burkinabé footballer
