= Volta Ciclistica Internacional do Estado de São Paulo =

Race details
- Date: Various, most recently May
- Region: Brazil
- English name: International Cycling Tour of the State of São Paulo
- Local name: Tour do Brasil
- Discipline: Road
- Competition: UCI America Tour
- Type: Stage race
- Web site: www.yescom.com.br/voltadoestado/2012/portugues/index.asp

History
- First edition: 2004
- Editions: 12 (as of 2026)
- First winner: Antônio Nascimento (BRA)
- Most wins: Gregolry Panizo (BRA); Magno Nazaret (BRA) (2 wins)
- Most recent: Igor Molina (BRA)

The Volta Ciclistica Internacional do Estado de São Paulo (International Cycling Tour of the State of São Paulo), also known as the Tour do Brasil, is a road cycling stage race held in the state of São Paulo. The race exists since 2004 as an elite men's competition over a prologue and 8 to 9 stages. The race is currently a 2.2 event in the UCI America Tour.

== Past winners ==
Year	Country	Rider	Team
2004	Brazil	Antonio Nascimento	Memorial–Santos
2005	Argentina	Jorge Giacinti	Memorial–Santos
2006	Brazil	Alex Diniz	CESC–Sundown
2007	Brazil	Marcos Novello	Memorial–Santos
2008	Brazil	Gregolry Panizo	Clube DataRo de Ciclismo
2009	Portugal	Sergio Ribeiro	Barbot–Siper
2010	Brazil	Gregolry Panizo	Clube DataRo de Ciclismo
2011	Brazil	José Eriberto Rodrigues	Padaria Real–Caloi–Ceu Azul Alimentos
2012	Brazil	Magno Nazaret	Funvic–Pindamonhangaba
2013	No race		
2014	Brazil	Magno Nazaret	Funvic Brasilinvest–São José dos Campos
2015–2024	No race		
2025	Brazil	Igor Molina	
