= Pascual Beká =

Equatoguinean footballer (born 1999)

Pascual
Personal information
- Full name: Pascual Beká Elebiyó Eyang
- Date of birth: 17 August 1999 (age 27)
- Place of birth: Ebibeyín, Equatorial Guinea
- Position: Goalkeeper

Team information
- Current team: Cano Sport
- Number: 13

Youth career
- Cano Sport

Senior career*
Years	Team	Apps	(Gls)
- Cano Sport
2018	→ Deportivo Unidad (loan)	0	(0)

International career^{‡}
2018–2019	Equatorial Guinea U23	3+	(0)
2018–	Equatorial Guinea	1	(0)
- * Club domestic league appearances and goals ‡ National team caps and goals as of 26 March 2019

Pascual Beká Elebiyó Eyang (born 17 August 1999), known as Pascual and Nasty, is an Equatoguinean footballer who plays as a goalkeeper for Liga Nacional de Fútbol club Cano Sport Academy and the Equatorial Guinea national team.

== International career ==
Pascual made his international debut for Equatorial Guinea in 2018.
