= Roméo Boni =

Burkinabé footballer

Personal information
- Date of birth: 7 February 1990 (age 36)
- Place of birth: Bobo-Dioulasso, Burkina Faso
- Height: 1.90 m (6 ft 3 in)
- Position: Striker

Team information
- Current team: AS Police

Senior career*
Years	Team	Apps	(Gls)
2014–	AS Police		

International career^{‡}
2018–	Burkina Faso	3	(0)
- * Club domestic league appearances and goals as of 14:02, 27 September 2018 (UTC) ‡ National team caps and goals as of 14:02, 27 September 2018 (UTC)

Roméo Boni (born 7 February 1990) is a Burkinabé international footballer who plays for AS Police, as a striker.

== Career ==
Born in Bobo-Dioulasso, he has played club football for AS Police.

He made his international debut for Burkina Faso in 2018.
