= Cosme Anvene =

Equatoguinean footballer (born 1990)

Personal information
- Full name: Cosme Anvene Ebana Elá
- Date of birth: 3 March 1990 (age 36)
- Place of birth: Añisoc, Equatorial Guinea
- Height: 1.79 m (5 ft 10 in)
- Position: Centre-back

Team information
- Current team: Deportivo Unidad

Senior career*
Years	Team	Apps	(Gls)
2012–2013	The Panthers		
2013–	Deportivo Unidad		
2023	→ Cano Sport (loan)		

International career^{‡}
2015–	Equatorial Guinea	18	(0)
- * Club domestic league appearances and goals ‡ National team caps and goals as of 27 September 2022

Cosme Anvene Ebana Elá (born 3 March 1990) is an Equatoguinean footballer who plays as a centre-back for LIFGE club Deportivo Unidad and the Equatorial Guinea national team.

== Club career ==
Cosme has played for The Panthers FC and Deportivo Unidad in Equatorial Guinea.

== International career ==
Cosme made his international debut for Equatorial Guinea in 2015.
