= Mariano Ondo =

Equatoguinean footballer (1999–2022)

- Ondo with KF Shkupi in 2018

Personal information
- Full name: Mariano Ondo Monsuy Angong
- Date of birth: 29 June 1999
- Place of birth: Ayene, Equatorial Guinea
- Date of death: 14 September 2022 (aged 23)
- Place of death: Malabo, Equatorial Guinea
- Position: Right back

Youth career
- Cano Sport

Senior career*
Years	Team	Apps	(Gls)
2017	Cano Sport		
2018	Shkupi	3	(0)
2019–2022	Cano Sport		

International career
2018–2019	Equatorial Guinea U23	1	(0)
2017–2022	Equatorial Guinea	7	(0)
- * Club domestic league appearances and goals

Mariano Ondo Monsuy Angong (29 June 1999 – 14 September 2022) was an Equatoguinean footballer who played as a right back. He represented Equatorial Guinea at under-23 and senior levels.

== Club career ==
Ondo has played club football for Cano Sport Academy and Shkupi. At the time of his death, he was expected to join Spanish club Rápido de Bouzas, after paperwork issues had been solved successfully - he had trained in that team during the 2021-22 season with a tourist visa, which prevented him from playing.

== International career ==
Ondo made his international debut for Equatorial Guinea in 2017.

== Death ==
Ondo died whilst training with the Equatorial Guinea national team on 14 September 2022, at the age of 23.
