= Moussa Sory =

Burkinabé footballer

Personal information
- Date of birth: 20 May 1988 (age 38)
- Place of birth: Banfora, Burkina Faso
- Position: Defender

Team information
- Current team: AJEB Bobo-Dioulasso

Senior career*
Years	Team	Apps	(Gls)
2010–2011	US de la Comoé		
2015–2017	RC Bobo Dioulasso		
2017–	AJEB Bobo-Dioulasso		

International career^{‡}
2018–	Burkina Faso	2	(0)
- * Club domestic league appearances and goals as of 14:23, 26 September 2018 (UTC) ‡ National team caps and goals as of 14:23, 26 September 2018 (UTC)

Moussa Sory (born 20 May 1988) is a Burkinabé international footballer who plays for AJEB Bobo-Dioulasso, as a defender.

== Career ==
Born in Banfora, he has played club football for US de la Comoé, RC Bobo Dioulasso and AJEB Bobo-Dioulasso.

He made his international debut for Burkina Faso in 2018.
