= Nathanio Kompaoré =

Burkinabé footballer (born 2001)

Personal information
- Full name: Nathanio Junior Kompaoré
- Date of birth: 20 June 2001 (age 25)
- Place of birth: Ouagadougou, Burkina Faso
- Position: Forward

Youth career
- 2019–2022: Anderlecht

Senior career*
Years	Team	Apps	(Gls)
2017–2019	Salitas Ouagadougou		

International career^{‡}
2019–2021	Burkina Faso U20		
2018–	Burkina Faso	3	(0)
Medal record
Men's football
Representing Burkina Faso
African Games
Gold medal – first place	2019 Rabat	Team competition
- * Club domestic league appearances and goals as of 4:33, 30 October 2020 (UTC) ‡ National team caps and goals as of 4:33, 30 October 2020 (UTC)

Nathanio Kompaoré (born 20 June 2001) is a Burkinabé footballer who plays as a forward in the Anderlecht youth system and the Burkina Faso national team.

== Club career ==
In October 2019, Kompaoré signed a three-year deal with Belgian side Anderlecht.

== International career ==
Kompaoré was first called up to the Burkina Faso senior squad in late 2017, as a part of the 25-man squad convened by manager Idrissa Malo Traoré for the 2018 African Nations Championship. At 16 years old, he was the youngest player in the competition. He made his international debut during the first group stage match against Angola on 16 January, playing the full 90 minutes of an eventual 0–0 draw. After the match, the Moroccan publication Le Matin called him a "young prodigy" and the "most talented" player on the pitch. He made two more appearances in the tournament (against Congo and Cameroon, respectively) as Burkina Faso finished third in their group, ending their campaign.

He won a gold medal with the national under-20 team at the 2019 African Games. He later represented the U20s at the 2021 U-20 Africa Cup of Nations.

== International statistics ==
As of match played 20 June 2018.

National team	Year	Apps	Goals
Burkina Faso	2018	3	0
Total		3	0

== Honours ==
=== Club ===
Salitas Ouagadougou

- Coupe du Faso: 2018
- Burkinabé SuperCup: 2018

Anderlecht

- Coupe de Belgique U21: 2022

=== International ===
Burkina Faso U20

- African Games: (gold) 2019
