= Gregolry Panizo =

Brazilian cyclist

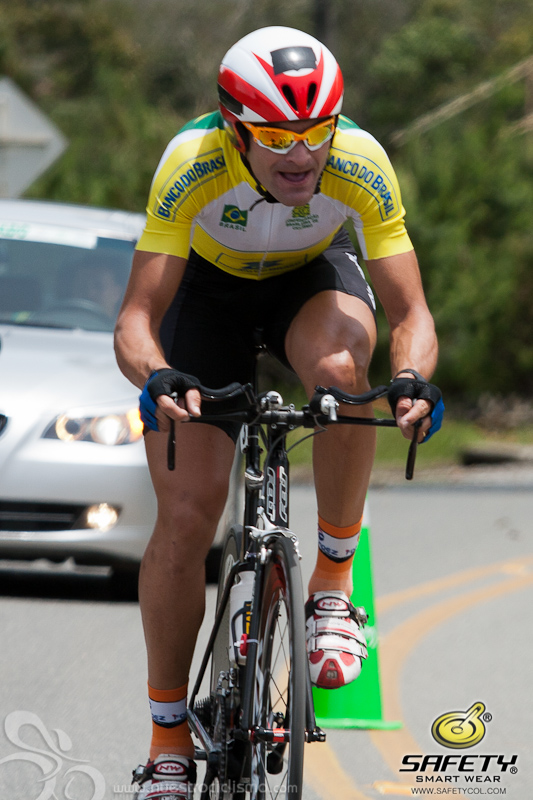
- Panizo at the 2011 Pan American Road and Track Championships

Personal information
- Full name: Gregolry Panizo
- Born: 12 May 1985 (age 41) Tupãssi, Brazil

Cycling career
- Sport: Cycling
- Current team: Retired
- Discipline: Road
- Role: Rider

Professional teams
- 2011: Clube DataRo de Ciclismo
- 2012–2013: Funvic–Pindamonhangaba
- 2014: Clube DataRo de Ciclismo–Bottecchia

Major wins
- Volta de Ciclismo Internacional do Estado de São Paulo (2008, 2010)
Medal record
Men's road cycling
Representing Brazil
Pan American Championships
Gold medal – first place	2011 Medellín	Road race

Gregolry Panizo (born 12 May 1985) is a Brazilian former professional road bicycle racer. He competed at the 2012 Summer Olympics in the Men's road race, but failed to finish.

== Major results ==
2007
2nd Overall Tour de Santa Catarina

1st Stages 5 & 11

7th Overall Volta de Ciclismo Internacional do Estado de São Paulo
8th Overall Volta do Paraná
2008
1st Overall Volta de Ciclismo Internacional do Estado de São Paulo
2010
1st Overall Volta de Ciclismo Internacional do Estado de São Paulo

1st Stage 8

4th Overall Volta do Paraná
2011
Pan American Road Championships

1st Road race
9th Time trial

2nd 2010–11 UCI America Tour
3rd Road race, National Road Championships
5th Overall Volta de Gravataí
2012
Vuelta a Guatemala

1st Points classification
1st Stage 2

5th Overall Tour do Brasil
2013
1st Stage 5 Tour do Rio
2014
3rd Overall Volta Ciclística Internacional do Rio Grande do Sul
3rd Overall Volta do Paraná
4th Overall Tour do Rio
9th Overall Tour do Brasil
