= Otávio Bulgarelli =

Former Brazilian cyclist (born 1984)

Personal information
- Born: 15 October 1984 (age 42) São Gonçalo do Sapucaí, Brazil
- Height: 1.80 m (5 ft 11 in)
- Weight: 69 kg (152 lb)

Cycling career
- Sport: Cycling
- Current team: Retired
- Discipline: Road
- Role: Rider

Professional teams
- 2011: Farnese Vini–Neri Sottoli
- 2012–2016: Funvic–Pindamonhangaba
Medal record
Men's road bicycle racing
Representing Brazil
Pan American Championships
Bronze medal – third place	2008 Montevideo	Road race

Otávio Bulgarelli Didier (born 15 October 1984) is a former Brazilian cyclist.

== Major results ==
2008
1st Stage 5 Tour do Brasil
3rd Pan American Road Race Championships
2009
2nd Overall Tour de Québec
3rd Overall Tour de Santa Catarina
4th Overall Tour de Santa Catarina
8th Overall Volta Ciclística Internacional do Rio Grande do Sul
2010
9th Giro del Casentino
2012
1st National Road Race Championships
7th Overall Vuelta a Guatemala
2013
1st Overall Tour de Santa Catarina

1st Stages 4 & 5

2014
6th Overall Volta Ciclística Internacional do Rio Grande do Sul
