= Ernesto Montero =

Equatoguinean footballer

Personal information
- Full name: Ernesto Montero Bicumba
- Date of birth: 17 April 1998 (age 28)
- Place of birth: Malabo, Equatorial Guinea
- Position: Left back

Team information
- Current team: Cano Sport
- Number: 3

Youth career
- Cano Sport

Senior career*
Years	Team	Apps	(Gls)
- Cano Sport
2018	→ Deportivo Unidad (loan)	0	(0)

International career^{‡}
2018–2019	Equatorial Guinea U23	4	(0)
2018–	Equatorial Guinea	2	(0)
- * Club domestic league appearances and goals ‡ National team caps and goals as of 26 March 2019

Ernesto Montero Bicumba (born 17 April 1998) is an Equatoguinean footballer who plays as a left back for Liga Nacional de Fútbol club Cano Sport Academy and the Equatorial Guinea national team.

== International career ==
Montero made his international debut for Equatorial Guinea in 2018.
