= Maxime Ouattara =

Burkinabé footballer

Personal information
- Date of birth: 10 January 1995 (age 31)
- Height: 1.83 m (6 ft 0 in)
- Position: Defender

Team information
- Current team: Salitas

Senior career*
Years	Team	Apps	(Gls)
2014–2017	AS SONABEL		
2017–	Salitas		

International career^{‡}
2015–	Burkina Faso	7	(0)
- * Club domestic league appearances and goals as of 13:14, 24 September 2018 (UTC) ‡ National team caps and goals as of 13:14, 24 September 2018 (UTC)

Maxime Ouattara (born 10 January 1995) is a Burkinabé international footballer who plays for Salitas, as a defender.

== Career ==
He has played club football for AS SONABEL and Salitas.

He made his international debut for Burkina Faso in 2015.
