= Moïse Zongo =

Burkinabé footballer

Personal information
- Date of birth: 10 March 1996 (age 30)
- Place of birth: Abidjan, Ivory Coast
- Position: Striker

Senior career*
Years	Team	Apps	(Gls)
2015–2016	CF Mounana		
2016–2017	Academie de Foot Amadou Diallo		
2017–2019	Salitas		
2019	Najran		
2020–2021	Al-Thoqbah		
2020	→ Al-Jubail (loan)		

International career^{‡}
2018–	Burkina Faso	2	(0)
- * Club domestic league appearances and goals as of 14:02, 27 September 2018 (UTC) ‡ National team caps and goals as of 14:02, 27 September 2018 (UTC)

Moïse Zongo (born 10 March 1996) is a Burkinabé international footballer who plays as a striker.

== Career ==
Born in Abidjan, Ivory Coast, he has played club football for CF Mounana, Academie de Foot Amadou Diallo and Salitas.

He made his international debut for Burkina Faso in 2018.

On 7 January 2019, Najran has signed Zongo for one seasons from Salitas.

On 31 January 2020, Al-Jubail has signed Zongo for one seasons.

On 29 December 2019, Al-Thoqbah has signed Zongo for one seasons.
