= AJE de Bobo =

Association Jeunes Espoirs de Bobo is a Burkinabé football team based in Bobo-Dioulasso which competes in the Burkinabé Premier League.
