= Nura Mohammed =

Nigerian footballer

Personal information
- Date of birth: 2 December 2002 (age 23)
- Height: 1.71 m (5 ft 7 in)
- Position: Striker

Team information
- Current team: Jigawa Golden Stars

Senior career*
Years	Team	Apps	(Gls)
2017	El-Kanemi Feeders		
2018	El-Kanemi Warriors		
2019	Kada City		
2019–	Jigawa Golden Stars		

International career^{‡}
2018–	Nigeria	2	(0)
- * Club domestic league appearances and goals as of 16:06, 21 February 2021 (UTC) ‡ National team caps and goals as of 16:06, 21 February 2021 (UTC)

Nura Mohammed, also known as Mohammed Nur (born 2 December 2002) is a Nigerian international footballer who plays for Jigawa Golden Stars, as a striker.

== Career ==
He has played club football for El-Kanemi Feeders, El-Kanemi Warriors, Kada City and Jigawa Golden Stars.

He made his international debut for Nigeria in 2018. Nur was selected for the 2018 African Nations Championship squad and made history as the youngest player to ever feature in the competition at the age of 15.
