= Adama Sawadogo =

Burkinabé footballer (born 1990)

Personal information
- Date of birth: 20 January 1990 (age 36)
- Place of birth: Ouahigouya, Burkina Faso
- Height: 1.87 m (6 ft 2 in)
- Position: Goalkeeper

Team information
- Current team: USFA

Senior career*
Years	Team	Apps	(Gls)
2008–2010	ASFA Yennenga		
2010–2014	Missile FC		
2015	FC 105 Libreville		
2015–2017	ASFA Yennenga		
2017–2019	Salitas		
2019–	USFA		

International career^{‡}
2009–	Burkina Faso	2	(0)
- * Club domestic league appearances and goals as of 11:00, 31 August 2018 (UTC) ‡ National team caps and goals as of 11:00, 31 August 2018 (UTC)

Adama Sawadogo (born 20 January 1990) is a Burkinabé international footballer who plays for Salitas, as a goalkeeper.

== Career ==
Born in Ouahigouya, Sawadogo has played club football for ASFA Yennenga, Missile FC, FC 105 Libreville and Salitas.

He made his international debut for Burkina Faso in 2009, and was selected for the 2012 Africa Cup of Nations.
