= Jael Mbogo =

Kenyan Social worker and women rights activist

- Born: Jael Mbogo; 1939 (age 86–87); Rift Valley Province, Kenya
- Education: Studied economics in the United States
- Occupations: Social worker, women's rights campaigner, politician
- Known for: Founder of the Forum for the Restoration of Democracy; first female shorthand typist at Nairobi City Council; political activism
- Political party: Forum for the Restoration of Democracy
- Spouse(s): Married in Gem, Siaya

Jael Mbogo (born 1939 in the Rift Valley Province) is a Kenyan social worker, women rights campaigner and politician. Her parents hail from Ugenya, Sidindi; but she is married in Gem, Siaya. She founded the Forum for the Restoration of Democracy, one of the early political parties in Kenya in East Africa. She was the first female shorthand typist employed to work at the City Council of Nairobi in the capital of Kenya.

== Career ==
Jael Mbogo was born in 1939 in Kenya and trained as a shorthand typist. She studied for an economics degree in the United States of America and worked with women political groups in Tanzania, returning to Kenya in 1965 with her family. She became a political figure by the turn of the 1960s. She contested against Mwai Kibaki (later the third president of Kenya from 2002 to 2013) in 1969 for the parliamentary seat of Bahati, now Kamukunji Constituency in Nairobi. At that time Mwai Kibaki was a sitting cabinet minister in the government of Jomo Kenyatta. Jael Mbogo lost to Mwai Kibaki by 500 votes.In the 1974 parliamentary elections, she posed stiff competition to Mr Kibaki forcing him to shift base to his native Othaya constituency. He would hold the seat from 1974 to 2013

== Political Involvement ==
Mbogo was a founding member of the Forum for the Restoration of Democracy, one of Kenya's early political parties. She also served as the Chairperson of the Maendeleo Ya Wanawake Organisation and held various positions, including Deputy General Secretary of the All Africa Conference of Churches.
