= Alphonse Tientcheu =

Cameroonian footballer

Personal information
- Full name: Alphonse Marie Tientcheu
- Date of birth: 4 September 1989 (age 37)
- Place of birth: Cameroon
- Height: 1.71 m (5 ft 7 in)
- Position: Left wing-back

Team information
- Current team: Futuro Kings
- Number: 27

Senior career*
Years	Team	Apps	(Gls)
2010–2011	Bandja FC		
2011–2012	Les Astres		
2013–2016	UMS Loum		
2017–2019	Eding Sport	16	(0)
2019–2020	Coton Sport		
2020–	Futuro Kings		

International career^{‡}
2017–2018	Cameroon	5	(0)
- * Club domestic league appearances and goals ‡ National team caps and goals as of 24 January 2018

Alphonse Marie Tientcheu (born 4 September 1989) is a Cameroonian footballer who plays as a left wing-back for Equatorial Guinean Liga Nacional club Futuro Kings FC. He has been a member of the Cameroon national team.
