= Junior Awono =

Cameroonian footballer (born 1994)

Personal information
- Date of birth: 20 November 1994 (age 31)
- Place of birth: Yaoundé, Cameroon
- Height: 1.80 m (5 ft 11 in)
- Position: Midfielder

Senior career*
Years	Team	Apps	(Gls)
2010–2011	APEJES Academy		
2011–2012	Botafogo Douala		
2014	Renaissance Ngoumou		
2015–2018	Yong Sports Academy		
2018–2019	Stellenbosch	35	(1)
2021	Sekhukhune United		
2021–2022	Al Tahaddy		
2022–2023	Al-Hudood		

International career^{‡}
2017–2018	Cameroon	4	(0)
- * Club domestic league appearances and goals as of 3 October 2021 ‡ National team caps and goals as of 3 October 2021

Junior Awono (born 20 November 1994) is a Cameroonian professional football midfielder.
