= Mohamed Saliou Camara =

Guinean footballer

Personal information
- Date of birth: 5 August 1996 (age 30)
- Position: Midfielder

Senior career*
Years	Team	Apps	(Gls)
- Fello Star

International career^{‡}
2018	Guinea	1	(0)
- * Club domestic league appearances and goals as of 23 December 2021 ‡ National team caps and goals as of 23 December 2021

Mohamed Saliou Camara (born 5 August 1996) is a Guinean footballer.

== Career statistics ==
=== International ===
As of matches played 23 December 2021.

Appearances and goals by national team and year
National team	Year	Apps	Goals
Guinea	2018	1	0
Total		1	0
