= Kimenyi Yves =

Rwandan goalkeeper

Personal information
- Full name: Kimenyi Yves
- Date of birth: 13 October 1992 (age 34)
- Place of birth: Kicukiro, Rwanda
- Height: 1.89 m (6 ft 2 in)
- Position: Goalkeeper

Team information
- Current team: AS_Kigali_F.C.

Senior career*
Years	Team	Apps	(Gls)
2014	APR_F.C.		
2019-2020	Rayon_Sports_F.C.		
2021-2023	S.C._Kiyovu_Sports		
2023-2024	AS_Kigali_F.C.		
- * Club domestic league appearances and goals

Kimenyi Yves, commonly known as Kimenyi (born 13 October 1992) is a Rwandan Goalkeeper for AS Kigali and the Rwanda national football team.

== Club career ==
In October 2023, AS Kigali FC's goalkeeper, Yves Kimenyi suffered a serious leg injury. He played as a goalkeeper for various teams in Rwanda, including Rayon Sports, APR FC, and Kiyovu Sport.

Since 2011, he has featured at all levels on national teams. Since boyhood, he has joined Imena Academy. Later, he moved to FERWAFA's academy, called Isonga Academy, and got relegated to the second division tier. Later, he was appointed as the goalkeeper of the Rwanda National Team, also called Amavubi.

== Personal life ==
Miss Muyango Uwase is his wife who became famous when she participated in the Miss Rwanda beauty pageant in 2019.
