= 2009 Volta de Ciclismo Internacional do Estado de São Paulo =

2009 Volta de São Paulo
Race details
- Dates: August 22–August 30, 2009
- Stages: 9
- Distance: 1,289 km (801 mi)
- Winning time: 27h 23' 00"

Results
| | Winner | Sérgio Ribeiro (Portugal) | (Barbot-Siper-Azeite Vila Flor-Portugal) |
| | Second | Bruno Pires (Portugal) | (Barbot-Siper-Azeite Vila Flor-Portugal) |
| | Third | Magno Nazaret (Brazil) | (FAPI-Pindamonhangaba) |
| | Points | Michel García (Cuba) | (CESC-Sundown) |
| | Mountains | Ricardo Ortiz (Brazil) | (Padaria Real-Sorocaba) |
| | Team | FAPI-Pindamonhangaba | |

The 2009 Volta de Ciclismo Internacional do Estado de São Paulo (Portuguese for International Cycling Tour of the State of São Paulo) is the 6th edition of a multi-day road cycling stage race held in the state of São Paulo. This edition features 9 stages over 1289 km, disputed from August 22 to 30, 2009. The race is a 2.2 event in the 2008–2009 UCI America Tour. In this edition, the race has been nicknamed Tour of Brazil.

== Classification and bonuses ==
In this edition of the race, time bonuses of 10, 6 and 4 seconds are awarded to the top 3 riders in each stage. Time bonuses of 3, 2 and 1 seconds are awarded to the first 3 riders at each intermediary sprint point. For the points classification, the top 5 riders in each stage are awarded 10, 7, 5, 3 and 2 points, respectively. The first 3 riders at each intermediary sprint receive 5, 3 and 2 points. Climbs are classified among 4 categories. The first 3 riders at each summit are awarded points in the mountains classification according to the category:

- Category 2: 9, 7, 6 pts
- Category 3: 7, 5, 4 pts
- Category 4: 5, 3, 2 pts

The team classification accounts the times of the first 3 riders of each team in each stage.

== Stages and Results ==
=== Stage 1: São Paulo ===
Held Saturday, August 22, 2009, on the Ponte Estaiada, in São Paulo. This prologue stage was a team time trial, for a total distance of 6.0 km. The stage was won by team Scott–Marcondes Cesar–São José dos Campos with a time of 7'44.831". Teams Padaria Real-Sorocaba and FAPI-Pindamonhangaba took second and third place, with times of 7'56.404" and 7'58.427", respectively. Curiously, bicycles aren't allowed in the Ponte Estaiada

=== Stage 2: São Paulo to São José dos Campos ===
Held Sunday, August 23, 2009. This stage was 91.1 km long. A field of 122 riders finished with the same time of the stage winner, Hector Figueiras.

Stage 2 Result

| | Nation | Cyclist | Team | Time |
|---|---|---|---|---|
| 1 | (Uruguay) | Hector Figueiras | FAPI-Pindamonhangaba | 2h11'34" |
| 2 | (Chile) | Luis Almonacid | Polidesportivo-Trek | s.t. |
| 3 | (Cuba) | Michel García | CESC-Sundown | s.t. |

General Classification after Stage 2

| | Nation | Cyclist | Team | Time |
|---|---|---|---|---|
| 1 | (Uruguay) | Hector Figueiras | FAPI-Pindamonhangaba | 2h11'22" |
| 2 | (Cuba) | Michel García | CESC-Sundown | +0'05" |
| 3 | (Chile) | Luis Almonacid | Polidesportivo-Trek | +0'06" |

Points Classification after Stage 2

| | Nation | Cyclist | Team | Points |
|---|---|---|---|---|
| 1 | (Uruguay) | Hector Figueiras | FAPI-Pindamonhangaba | 13 pts |
| 2 | (Cuba) | Michel García | CESC-Sundown | 10 pts |
| 3 | (Chile) | Luis Almonacid | Polidesportivo-Trek | 7 pts |

Mountain Classification after Stage 2

| | Nation | Cyclist | Team | Points |
|---|---|---|---|---|
| 1 | (Brazil) | Ricardo Ortiz | Padaria Real-Sorocaba | 5 pts |
| 2 | (Brazil) | Antônio Nascimento | Memorial-Santos | 3 pts |
| 3 | (Brazil) | Bruno Silva | São Lucas-Americana | 2 pts |

=== Stage 3: São José dos Campos to Atibaia ===
Held Monday, August 24, 2009. This stage was 103.0 km long.

Stage 3 Result

| | Nation | Cyclist | Team | Time |
|---|---|---|---|---|
| 1 | (Portugal) | Sérgio Ribeiro | Barbot-Siper-Azeite Vila Flor-Portugal | 2h26'13" |
| 2 | (Portugal) | Bruno Pires | Barbot-Siper-Azeite Vila Flor-Portugal | s.t. |
| 3 | (Brazil) | Magno Nazaret | FAPI-Pindamonhangaba | +0'04" |

General Classification after Stage 3

| | Nation | Cyclist | Team | Time |
|---|---|---|---|---|
| 1 | (Portugal) | Sérgio Ribeiro | Barbot-Siper-Azeite Vila Flor-Portugal | 4h37'34" |
| 2 | (Portugal) | Bruno Pires | Barbot-Siper-Azeite Vila Flor-Portugal | +0'07" |
| 3 | (Brazil) | Magno Nazaret | FAPI-Pindamonhangaba | +0'13" |

Points Classification after Stage 3

| | Nation | Cyclist | Team | Points |
|---|---|---|---|---|
| 1 | (Portugal) | Sérgio Ribeiro | Barbot-Siper-Azeite Vila Flor-Portugal | 19 pts |
| 2 | (Uruguay) | Hector Figueiras | FAPI-Pindamonhangaba | 13 pts |
| 3 | (Cuba) | Michel García | CESC-Sundown | 10 pts |

Mountain Classification after Stage 3

| | Nation | Cyclist | Team | Points |
|---|---|---|---|---|
| 1 | (Brazil) | Ricardo Ortiz | Padaria Real-Sorocaba | 10 pts |
| 2 | (Portugal) | Bruno Pires | Barbot-Siper-Azeite Vila Flor-Portugal | 7 pts |
| 3 | (Brazil) | Bruno Silva | São Lucas-Americana | 6 pts |

=== Stage 4: Atibaia to São Carlos ===
Held Tuesday, August 25, 2009. This stage was 239 km long.

Stage 4 Result

| | Nation | Cyclist | Team | Time |
|---|---|---|---|---|
| 1 | (Portugal) | Sérgio Ribeiro | Barbot-Siper-Azeite Vila Flor-Portugal | 5h42'24" |
| 2 | (Brazil) | Tiago Fiorilli | Flying Horse-Caloi | +0'01" |
| 3 | (Portugal) | Bruno Pires | Barbot-Siper-Azeite Vila Flor-Portugal | +0'03" |

General Classification after Stage 4

| | Nation | Cyclist | Team | Time |
|---|---|---|---|---|
| 1 | (Portugal) | Sérgio Ribeiro | Barbot-Siper-Azeite Vila Flor-Portugal | 10h19'48" |
| 2 | (Portugal) | Bruno Pires | Barbot-Siper-Azeite Vila Flor-Portugal | +0'14" |
| 3 | (Brazil) | Magno Nazaret | FAPI-Pindamonhangaba | +0'26" |

Points Classification after Stage 4

| | Nation | Cyclist | Team | Points |
|---|---|---|---|---|
| 1 | (Portugal) | Sérgio Ribeiro | Barbot-Siper-Azeite Vila Flor-Portugal | 30 pts |
| 2 | (Portugal) | Bruno Pires | Barbot-Siper-Azeite Vila Flor-Portugal | 15 pts |
| 3 | (Uruguay) | Hector Figueiras | FAPI-Pindamonhangaba | 13 pts |

Mountain Classification after Stage 4

| | Nation | Cyclist | Team | Points |
|---|---|---|---|---|
| 1 | (Portugal) | Bruno Pires | Barbot-Siper-Azeite Vila Flor-Portugal | 16 pts |
| 2 | (Brazil) | Ricardo Ortiz | Padaria Real-Sorocaba | 12 pts |
| 3 | (Brazil) | Bruno Silva | São Lucas-Americana | 9 pts |

=== Stage 5: São Carlos to Ribeirão Preto ===
Held Wednesday, August 26, 2009. This stage was 95.8 km long.

Stage 5 Result

| | Nation | Cyclist | Team | Time |
|---|---|---|---|---|
| 1 | (Cuba) | Michel García | CESC-Sundown | 2h14'43" |
| 2 | (Portugal) | Sérgio Ribeiro | Barbot-Siper-Azeite Vila Flor-Portugal | s.t. |
| 3 | (Brazil) | Kleber Silva | FAPI-Pindamonhangaba | s.t. |

General Classification after Stage 5

| | Nation | Cyclist | Team | Time |
|---|---|---|---|---|
| 1 | (Portugal) | Sérgio Ribeiro | Barbot-Siper-Azeite Vila Flor-Portugal | 12h34'25" |
| 2 | (Portugal) | Bruno Pires | Barbot-Siper-Azeite Vila Flor-Portugal | +0'20" |
| 3 | (Brazil) | Magno Nazaret | FAPI-Pindamonhangaba | +0'32" |

Points Classification after Stage 5

| | Nation | Cyclist | Team | Points |
|---|---|---|---|---|
| 1 | (Portugal) | Sérgio Ribeiro | Barbot-Siper-Azeite Vila Flor-Portugal | 37 pts |
| 2 | (Cuba) | Michel García | CESC-Sundown | 20 pts |
| 3 | (Uruguay) | Hector Figueiras | FAPI-Pindamonhangaba | 18 pts |

Mountain Classification after Stage 5

| | Nation | Cyclist | Team | Points |
|---|---|---|---|---|
| 1 | (Portugal) | Bruno Pires | Barbot-Siper-Azeite Vila Flor-Portugal | 18 pts |
| 2 | (Brazil) | Ricardo Ortiz | Padaria Real-Sorocaba | 17 pts |
| 3 | (Brazil) | Bruno Silva | São Lucas-Americana | 9 pts |
