= Dalí (footballer) =

Equatoguinean footballer

Personal information
- Full name: Reginaldo Dalin Nkogo Obama
- Date of birth: 20 March 1999 (age 27)
- Place of birth: Bata, Equatorial Guinea
- Height: 1.70 m (5 ft 7 in)
- Position: Left midfielder

Youth career
- 2014–2018: Cano Sport

Senior career*
Years	Team	Apps	(Gls)
- Cano Sport

International career^{‡}
2018–2019	Equatorial Guinea U23	1+	(0)
2018	Equatorial Guinea	1	(0)
- * Club domestic league appearances and goals ‡ National team caps and goals as of 18 January 2019

Reginaldo Dalin Nkogo Obama (born 20 March 1999), sportingly known as Dalí or Dalin, is an Equatoguinean footballer who plays as a left midfielder for Liga Nacional de Fútbol club Cano Sport Academy. He was a member of the Equatorial Guinea national team.

== International career ==
Dalí made his international debut for Equatorial Guinea on 18 January 2018. That day, he was a second half substitution in a 0–1 loss to Rwanda at the 2018 African Nations Championship.

== Career statistics ==
=== International ===
As of 18 January 2018

Equatorial Guinea
Year	Apps	Goals
2018	1	0
Total	1	0
