= Álvaro Tardáguila =

Uruguayan cyclist

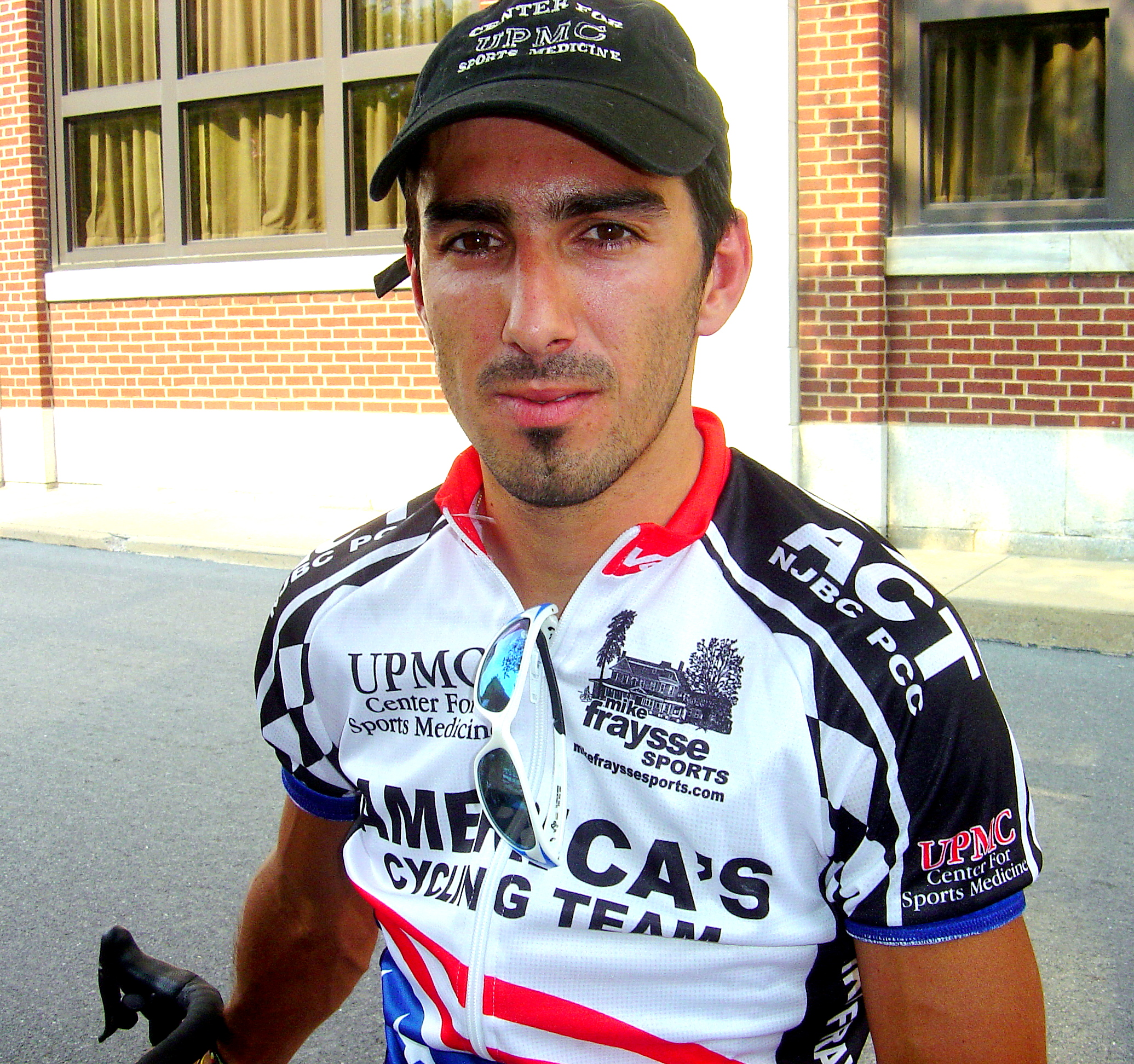
- Alvaro Tardáguila in 2005

Personal information
- Full name: Álvaro Walter Tardáguila Silva
- Nickname: "Coto"
- Born: August 16, 1975 (age 51) Uruguay
- Height: 5 ft 9 in (1.75 m)
- Weight: 150 lb (68 kg)

Cycling career
- Sport: Cycling
- Discipline: Road
- Role: Rider
- Rider type: All-around

Amateur teams
- -: Club Ciclista Deportivo San Antonio
- -: Dolores Cycles Club
- -: Alas Rojas de Santa Lucía
- -: Uruguayan National Team
- -: La Polar
- -: UPMC-ACT

Major wins
- 2005 Vuelta del Uruguay - 1st General Classification; 2006 Rutas de America - 1st, stage 2004 Tour de Korea - 1st, stage

Álvaro Tardáguila Silva (born August 16, 1975) is a Uruguayan professional racing cyclist. He won the 2005 edition of his home tour, the Vuelta del Uruguay. Tardáguila is the son of Walter Tardáguila, a 1972 Olympian (cycling road race and team time trial), and also the winner of the 1972 edition of the Vuelta Ciclista del Uruguay.

== Doping ==
Tardaguila served a two-year ban for doping after testing positive for EPO and an anabolic agent at the 2005 Great Downer Avenue Bike Race in Milwaukee, Wisconsin, US. While announced by USADA in February 2006, the suspension was retroactive to October 17, 2005.

Tardáguila last competed for the Club Ciclista Deportivo San Antonio.

== Career highlights ==
- 2003: 3rd in Mount Holly-Smithville (USA)
- 2004: 1st in Stage 4 Tour de Korea, Yang Yang (KOR)
- 2004: 1st in Murraysville Classic (USA)
- 2005: 1st in Stage 5 Clásica del Oeste-Doble Bragado, O'Brien (ARG)
- 2005: 1st in Stage 7 Clásica del Oeste-Doble Bragado, Caseros (ARG)
- 2005: 1st in General Classification Vuelta Ciclista del Uruguay (URU)
- 2005: 2nd in Mount Holly-Smithville (USA) (officially removed from race results after testing positive)
- 2005: 2nd in General Classification Tour of Christiana (USA)
- 2005: 2nd in Univest GP, Criterium (USA)
- 2006: 1st in Stage 6 Rutas de America, Tacuarembo (URU)
- 2008: 3rd in General Classification Vuelta al Chana (URU)

== See also ==
- List of doping cases in cycling
