= Lawrence Chungu =

Zambian footballer (born 1991)

Personal information
- Date of birth: 11 November 1991 (age 34)
- Place of birth: Luwingu, Zambia
- Height: 1.70 m (5 ft 7 in)
- Position: Left-back

Team information
- Current team: Zanaco F.C.
- Number: 3

Senior career*
Years	Team	Apps	(Gls)
2010–2011	Kabwe Warriors		
2011–2017	Power Dynamos		
2017–2019	Buildcon		
2019–	Zanaco		

International career^{‡}
2011–	Zambia	13	(0)
- * Club domestic league appearances and goals ‡ National team caps and goals as of 13 October 2019

Lawrence Chungu (born 11 November 1991) is a Zambian footballer who plays as a defender for Zanaco F.C. and the Zambia national football team.
