= Timothy Danladi =

Nigerian international footballer

Personal information
- Date of birth: 15 October 1996 (age 30)
- Place of birth: Katsina, Nigeria
- Height: 1.82 m (6 ft 0 in)
- Position: Defender

Team information
- Current team: Enyimba

Senior career*
Years	Team	Apps	(Gls)
2015–2016	Taraba		
2017–2019	Katsina United		
2019–	Enyimba		

International career^{‡}
2018–	Nigeria	1	(0)
- * Club domestic league appearances and goals as of 10:12, 13 November 2020 (UTC) ‡ National team caps and goals as of 10:12, 13 November 2020 (UTC)

Timothy Danladi (born 15 October 1996) is a Nigerian international footballer who plays for Enyimba, as a defender.

== Career ==
Born in Katsina, Danladi has played club football for Taraba, Katsina United and Enyimba.

He made his international debut for Nigeria in 2018.
