= Hussein Al Jerif =

Sudanese footballer

Personal information
- Full name: Hussein Ibrahim Ahmed Mursal
- Date of birth: 23 September 1998 (age 28)
- Place of birth: Sudan
- Height: 1.76 m (5 ft 9 in)
- Position: Centre-back

Team information
- Current team: Kober SC
- Number: 23

Senior career*
Years	Team	Apps	(Gls)
2011–2013	Abu Hasheish		
2014–2016	Al-Jerif		
2016–2019	Al-Hilal		
2019–2021	Al-Khartoum		
2021–2025	Hilal Alsahil SC		
2026-	Kober SC		

International career
2017–2021	Sudan	11	(0)
Medal record
Men's football
Representing Sudan
African Nations Championship
Third place	2018 Morocco
- * Club domestic league appearances and goals

Hussein Ibrahim Ahmed Mursal (born 23 September 1998) is a Sudanese footballer who plays as a centre-back for Sudanese club Al-Khartoum and the Sudan national team.

== International career ==
Al Jarf made his debut for the Sudan national team on 9 June 2017, at the 2019 Africa Cup of Nations against Madagascar.

== Honours ==
Sudan

- African Nations Championship: 3rd place, 2018
