= Arnaud Bandé =

Burkinabé footballer

Personal information
- Full name: Arnaud Julius Stéphane Bandé
- Date of birth: 8 October 1993 (age 33)
- Position: Midfielder

Team information
- Current team: US Ouagadougou

Senior career*
Years	Team	Apps	(Gls)
2017–	US Ouagadougou		

International career^{‡}
2018–	Burkina Faso	1	(0)
- * Club domestic league appearances and goals as of 14:02, 27 September 2018 (UTC) ‡ National team caps and goals as of 14:02, 27 September 2018 (UTC)

Arnaud Julius Stéphane Bandé (born 18 October 1993) is a Burkinabé international footballer who plays for US Ouagadougou, as a midfielder.

== Career ==
He has played club football for US Ouagadougou.

He made his international debut for Burkina Faso in 2018.
