= Vitapi Ngaruka =

Namibian footballer

Personal information
- Full name: Vitapi Punyu Ngaruka
- Date of birth: 16 October 1995 (age 31)
- Place of birth: Otjombinde, Namibia
- Height: 1.90 m (6 ft 3 in)
- Position: Defender

Team information
- Current team: African Stars SC
- Number: 18

Senior career*
Years	Team	Apps	(Gls)
2013–2015	United Stars	15	(5)
2016–	Black Africa	60	(7)

International career^{‡}
2018–	Namibia	19	(3)
- * Club domestic league appearances and goals as of 09:39, 4 August 2020 (UTC) ‡ National team caps and goals as of 17:45, 19 November 2024 (UTC)

Vitapi Punyu Ngaruka (born 16 October 1995) is a Namibian footballer who plays as a defender for African Stars and the Namibia national football team.

== Career statistics ==
=== International ===
As of match played 19 November 2024

Appearances and goals by national team and year
National team	Year	Apps	Goals
Namibia	2018	6	1
Namibia	2019	6	0
Namibia	2020	3	0
Namibia	2021	1	0
Namibia	2024	3	0
Total		19	1

=== International goals ===
As of 4 August 2020. Namibia score listed first, score column indicates score after each Ngaruka goal.

International goals by date, venue, cap, opponent, score, result and competition
No.	Date	Venue	Cap	Opponent	Score	Result	Competition	Ref.
1	27 March 2018	Sam Nujoma Stadium, Windhoek, Namibia	4	Lesotho	1–1	2–1	Friendly	
