= CD Los Yébenes San Bruno =

Spanish football club

Los Yébenes San Bruno
- Full name: Club Deportivo Los Yébenes San Bruno
- Nickname: Yebenistas
- Founded: 1970
- Ground: Eustasio Casallo, Madrid, Spain
- Chairman: Eustasio Casallo
- Manager: Ricardo
- League: Preferente de Aficionados – Group 4
- 2024–25: Primera Autonómica de Aficionados – Group 2, 16th of 18 (relegated)
- Website: http://losyebenessanbruno.es
Home colours	Away colours

Club Deportivo Los Yébenes San Bruno is a Spanish football club based in the neighborhood of Aluche, Latina District, Madrid. Founded in 1970, they play in Preferente de Aficionados – Group 4, holding home matches at the Estadio Eustasio Casallo.

== History ==
Founded in 1970, in its beginnings the club competed under the name of C.D. Los Yébenes Aluche and at the end of the 80s joined the U.D. San Bruno, adopting the current name since then. In 2001, the first team suffered relegation from the Regional Preferente, but remained in the category for the 2001–02 season after taking the place of the B-team, which had achieved promotion from Primera Regional.

=== Club background ===
- Club Deportivo Los Yébenes Aluche (1970–1989)
- Club Deportivo Los Yébenes San Bruno (1989–)

== Stadium ==
The soccer field "Eustasio Casallo", is located in the park "Cerro Almodóvar" of the district, next to the Street Los Yébenes that gives name to the club. The field has an artificial grass surface, after the integral reform carried out in the summer of 2009 and completed in January 2010 with its reopening.

== Season to season ==
Season	Tier	Division	Place	Copa del Rey
1980–81	9	3ª Reg.	8th	
1981–82	9	3ª Reg.	10th	
1982–83	8	3ª Reg. P.	3rd	
1983–84	7	2ª Reg.	12th	
1984–85	7	2ª Reg.	10th	
1985–86	7	2ª Reg.	5th	
1986–87	6	1ª Reg.	13th	
1987–88	6	1ª Reg.	13th	
1988–89	6	1ª Reg.	13th	
1989–90	6	1ª Reg.	8th	
1990–91	6	1ª Reg.	12th	
1991–92	6	1ª Reg.	4th	
1992–93	6	1ª Reg.	5th	
1993–94	6	1ª Reg.	6th	
1994–95	6	1ª Reg.	1st	
1995–96	5	Reg. Pref.	8th	
1996–97	5	Reg. Pref.	5th	
1997–98	5	Reg. Pref.	13th	
1998–99	5	Reg. Pref.	7th	
1999–2000	5	Reg. Pref.	15th	

Season	Tier	Division	Place	Copa del Rey
2000–01	6	1ª Reg.	15th	
2001–02	5	Reg. Pref.	7th	
2002–03	5	Reg. Pref.	7th	
2003–04	5	Reg. Pref.	13th	
2004–05	5	Reg. Pref.	15th	
2005–06	6	1ª Reg.	5th	
2006–07	6	1ª Reg.	7th	
2007–08	6	1ª Reg.	5th	
2008–09	6	1ª Reg.	3rd	
2009–10	5	Pref.	13th	
2010–11	5	Pref.	14th	
2011–12	5	Pref.	6th	
2012–13	5	Pref.	2nd	
2013–14	4	3ª	22nd	
2014–15	5	Pref.	4th	
2015–16	5	Pref.	12th	
2016–17	5	Pref.	2nd	
2017–18	4	3ª	17th	
2018–19	5	Pref.	10th	
2019–20	5	Pref.	18th	

Season	Tier	Division	Place	Copa del Rey
2020–21	5	Pref.	11th	
2021–22	6	Pref.	6th	
2022–23	6	Pref.	11th	Preliminary
2023–24	6	Pref.	10th	
2024–25	6	1ª Aut.	16th	
2025–26	7	Pref. Afic.		

- 2 seasons in Tercera División
