= Idrissa Traoré (footballer, born 1943) =

Burkinabé footballer (1943–2023)

Personal information
- Full name: Idrissa Malo Traoré
- Date of birth: 24 December 1943
- Place of birth: Gaoua, Upper Volta
- Date of death: 3 December 2023 (aged 79)
- Position: Right-back

Senior career*
| Years | Team | Apps | (Gls) |
- Bobo Dioulasso
- Jeanne d'Arc

International career
| 1964–1970 | Burkina Faso | | |

Managerial career
- 1977–1980: Rail Club Kadiogo
- 1986–1988: ASEC Mimosas
- 1992–1996: Burkina Faso
- 2001–2002: ASEC Mimosas
- 2006–2007: Burkina Faso
- * Club domestic league appearances and goals

Idrissa "Saboteur" Malo Traoré (24 December 1943 – 3 December 2023) was a Burkinabé football manager and player. He managed the Burkina Faso national team.

== Playing career ==
Traoré played as a right-back in Burkina Faso with Bobo Dioulasso and Jeanne d'Arc. He represented the Burkina Faso national team from 1964 to 1970.

== Managerial career ==
Towards the end of his playing career, Traoré got his management badges and began his managerial career with Rail Club Kadiogo. He moved to the Ivory Coast with ASEC Mimosas in 1986, Djoliba AC 2000. He thereafter was appointed the manager of the Burkina Faso national team from 1992 to 1996, and had another stint with them in 2006.

== Death ==
Traoré died on 3 December 2023.
