= Ousmane Siry =

Burkinabé footballer

Personal information
- Full name: Ousmane Biébli Siry
- Date of birth: 30 May 1991 (age 35)
- Position: Midfielder

Team information
- Current team: Rahimo FC

Senior career*
Years	Team	Apps	(Gls)
2016–	Rahimo FC		

International career^{‡}
2018–	Burkina Faso	1	(0)
- * Club domestic league appearances and goals as of 14:02, 27 September 2018 (UTC) ‡ National team caps and goals as of 14:02, 27 September 2018 (UTC)

Ousmane Biébli Siry (born 30 May 1991) is a Burkinabé international footballer who plays for Rahimo FC, as a midfielder.

== Career ==
He has played club football for Rahimo FC.

He made his international debut for Burkina Faso in 2018.
