= Ally Mbogo =

Rwandan footballer

Personal information
- Date of birth: 14 November 1994 (age 31)
- Position: Defender

Team information
- Current team: Bugesera

Senior career*
Years	Team	Apps	(Gls)
2016–2017	Espoir		
2017–2018	Kiyovu Sports		
2019–	Bugesera		

International career^{‡}
2017	Rwanda	2	(0)
- * Club domestic league appearances and goals as of 1 August 2020 ‡ National team caps and goals as of 1 August 2020

Ally Mbogo (born 14 November 1994) is a Rwandan football defender who plays for Bugesera.
