= Abubakar Kasule =

Ugandan association football player (born 1999)

Personal information
- Full name: Abubakar Muhammad Kasule
- Date of birth: 5 January 1999 (age 27)
- Place of birth: Uganda
- Height: 1.56 m (5 ft 1 1/2 in)
- Position: Defender

Team information
- Current team: Express FC
- Number: 2
| 2017– | Express FC | | |

International career^{‡}
| Years | Team | Apps | (Gls) |
| 2018– | Uganda | 4 | |
- ‡ National team caps and goals as of 2018

Abubakar Muhammad Kasule better known as Abubakar Kasule is a Ugandan professional football player who plays for a Uganda Premier League club Express FC.
