= Emilio Martin =

Namibian footballer

Personal information
- Full name: Emilio Oupapa Martin
- Date of birth: 15 August 1990 (age 36)
- Place of birth: Oshakati, Namibia
- Height: 1.94 m (6 ft 4 1/2 in)
- Position: Defensive midfielder

Team information
- Current team: Tigers

Senior career*
Years	Team	Apps	(Gls)
2009–2010	Namib Colts		
2010–2013	Ramblers		
2013–2021	Black Africa		
2022-2023	African Stars		

International career^{‡}
2011–	Namibia	17	(0)
- * Club domestic league appearances and goals as of 20:37, 9 October 2020 (UTC) ‡ National team caps and goals as of 20:37, 9 October 2020 (UTC)

Emilio Oupapa Martin (born 15 August 1990) is a Namibian footballer who plays as a defensive midfielder for Black Africa and the Namibia national football team.
