= AS Police (Ouagadougou) =

- Ground: Stade Dr Issoufou Joseph Conombo
- Capacity: 15,000
- League: Burkinabé Deuxième Division

AS Police is a Burkinabé football team based in Ouagadougou which competes in the Burkinabé Premier League.
