= Cano Sport Academy =

Cano Sport
- Full name: Cano Sport Academy
- Founded: 28 March 2014; 11 years ago
- Ground: Pablo Boyas de Sampaca; Malabo, Equatorial Guinea
- Chairman: Cándido Nsue Ndong Esono
- Head coach: Héctor Nsue Obiang Nchama
- League: Liga Nacional de Fútbol
- 2019: 1°
Home colours	Away colours

Cano Sport Academy, simply known as Cano Sport, is an Equatoguinean football club based in the city of Malabo. It was founded in early 2014 by Cándido Nsue. They are the current champions of the Liga Nacional de Fútbol.

== Achievements ==
- Equatoguinean Premier League
  - Champions (1): 2019

== Players ==
=== Current squad ===
As of 27 December 2023

Note: Flags indicate national team as defined under FIFA eligibility rules; some limited exceptions apply. Players may hold more than one non-FIFA nationality.

No.	Pos.	Nation	Player
1	GK	(Equatorial Guinea) EQG	Marcos Ondo
2	DF	(Equatorial Guinea) EQG	Mariano Eló
5	MF	(Equatorial Guinea) EQG	Sebastián Mbang
6	MF	(Equatorial Guinea) EQG	Kike Richard
7	FW	(Equatorial Guinea) EQG	Melchor Eneme
8	MF	(Equatorial Guinea) EQG	Mansueto Nguema
12	MF	(Equatorial Guinea) EQG	Salvador Nguema

No.	Pos.	Nation	Player
15	FW	(Equatorial Guinea) EQG	Juan Antonio Nsue
16	MF	(Equatorial Guinea) EQG	Reginaldo Dalín
17	FW	(Equatorial Guinea) EQG	José María Asumu
20	DF	(Equatorial Guinea) EQG	Pablo Bernardo Edú
22	MF	(Equatorial Guinea) EQG	Reginaldo Nsue
24	FW	(Equatorial Guinea) EQG	José Manuel Ovono
