= Moumouni =

Moumouni is a given name and a surname. Notable people with the name include:

Surname:

- Abdou Moumouni (born 1982), Togolese footballer
- Abdou Moumouni University, the only public university in Niger
- Basile Adjou Moumouni (1922–2019), Beninese physician
- Yacouba Moumouni, singer and flautist

Given name:

- Moumouni Adamou Djermakoye (1939–2009), Nigerian politician
- Moumouni Dagano (born 1981), Burkinabé football player
- Moumouni Fabre (born 1953), Burkinabé politician
