= Abdramane Ouattara =

Burkinabé footballer

Personal information
- Full name: Abdramane Ouattara
- Date of birth: December 31, 1986 (age 39)
- Place of birth: Bobo-Dioulasso, Burkina Faso
- Height: 1.72 m (5 ft 7 1/2 in)
- Position: Defender

Team information
- Current team: Étoile Filante
- Number: 2

Youth career
- 2000–2003: ASFA Yennenga

Senior career*
Years	Team	Apps	(Gls)
2003–2006	ASF Bobo		
2006–	Étoile Filante		

International career
2004–2005	Burkina Faso	4	(0)
- * Club domestic league appearances and goals as of 16:33, 20 May 2008 (UTC)

Abdramane Ouattara (born 31 December 1986) is a Burkinabé professional football player who plays for Étoile Filante.

== Career ==
Ouattara began his career in the youth from ASFA Yennenga and signed in 2003 his profi contract with ASF Bobo. He played four years for the club in the Burkinabé Premier League, before joined in summer 2006 to his current club Étoile Filante.

== International ==
Ouattara holds for the Burkina Faso national football team four games, he played his first game on 5 June 2004 and the last on 9 October 2004.
