= Medard Mulangala =

Médard Mulangala Lwakabwanga

Member of the National Assembly
- Incumbent
- Assumed office 30 July 2006

Leader of the Union for a Republican Majority

Personal details
- Born: 17 January 1957 (age 69) Kananga, Belgian Congo
- Party: Union for a Republican Majority

Médard Mulangala Lwakabwanga (commonly known as Medard Mulangala; born 17 January 1957) is a politician from the Democratic Republic of the Congo. He is President of the Union for a Republican Majority and a leader of the Union Sacree pour l’Alternance, an umbrella grouping of opposition parliamentary parties and community groups that forms the third-largest political structure within the opposition and Rapporteur of the National Assembly's Committee on Economics and Finance, making him the opposition's lead spokesman on budgetary, economic and investment policy in the Republic.

A political commentator on the affairs of the DRC, the Great Lakes of Africa and the African continent, Mulangala was seen as a leading candidate for president of the Democratic Republic of Congo in the presidential elections of 2011 as a unity figure able to bring together the disparate parliamentary and nationwide opposition.

== Biography ==
=== Early life ===
Mulangala was born on 17 January 1957 in Kananga, capital of Western Kasaï Province of Belgian Congo to François Lwakabwanga Mukungishi and Thérèse Shaumba wa Shaumba, the fourth of seven children.

Mulangala's father was politically active and was one of the founders of Lulua Frères the leading socio-political movement in western Kasaï before Independence. As a leader of Lulua Frères he was a delegate to the Round Table of 1960 held in Brussels during which Independence from Belgium was negotiated. Following Independence, Mulangala's father was elected as a provincial MP of Western Kasai and then three times as Governor of Western Kasaï, and from 1966 – 1969 he served as the governor of Bandundu, Kivu and Bas Congo provinces. After growing disenchanted with Mobutu regime he became a leading figure in the founding of the Union pour la Démocratie et le Progrès social (UDPS), an opposition movement to Mobutu formerly launched in February 1982. He is now retired from politics.

Much of Mulangala's early life was spent away from his parents with much of his informative years spent in Belgium. He did, however, return each summer to his family in DRC to the various provinces where his father was assigned, and later, to Kinshasa after his family's relocation there in 1970.

=== Education ===
Mulangala started primary school in 1963 at the Institut Saint Dominique Savio in Mikalayi (Western Kasaï) and completed this stage of his education at Collège Saint Joseph in Mouscron, Belgium. His secondary education was begun and completed at Collège Saint Henri in Comines, a catholic boarding school in Belgium.

In 1979 Mulangala received a BA Hons in Business & Finance from the Institut Catholique des Hautes Etudes Commerciales (ICHEC) in Brussels, Belgium.

In 1996, Mulangala attended the College of Petroleum and Energy Studies, part of the Oxford-Princetown Programme, in Oxford, England.

=== Political career ===
In 1990, as calls for democratic reforms in the then Zaire became unstoppable, President Mobutu Sese Seko began to bow to the calls from the international community and the opposition to widen his government and initiate moves towards multiparty democracy.

1990 Mobutu began to open his government to groups and individuals other than his own supporters and Mulangala joined the Government. In that year, Mulangala then a senior corporate banker in the region and because of his family and political roots in the important business and mining province of Western Kasaï was appointed to the reformist Government of Prime Minister Lunda Bululu, initially as Minister of Mining and Energy. Between 1990 and 1992 he held various ministerial positions in the reformist transition government including Minister for Petroleum, Minister for Land and Mines, and Minister for Industry and SME development. Mulangala remained in the Cabinet until the election of Étienne Tshisekedi wa Mulumba as Prime Minister in September 1992.

Mulangala remained in the country during Kabila's seizure of power at the end of the First Congo War hoping the change of regime would bring about the badly needed reforms that Congolese had been waiting for. However, he quickly became disillusioned as corruption and political repression grew in the years after 1997. In 1998, Mulangala became a member of the executive of the Congolese Rally for Democracy (RCD), a group in opposition to Kabila's continuing leadership of the country.

In disagreement with RCD's strategy of direct action against the Government, Mulangala later resigned from the executive and the organisation, and became in 2000 a founder member of FRUONAR (The United Opposition Front for Non-Armed Struggle) and its representative in Europe.

Mulangala was an active figure (he chaired the working group responsible for drafting the resolution on the sensitive nationality issue) at the Accord Global et Inclusif of 2002 in Pretoria (peace talks between warring factions, non armed opposition and civil society) organised under the umbrella of South Africa that put an end to what is generally recalled as the African first world war and paved the way for a power sharing agreement implemented in 2003. He was designated MP to the Transitional Parliament as a representative of the non-armed political opposition. In this transitional government, he served as the Rapporteur of the Reconstruction and Development Committee.

In 2005, as presidential and parliamentary elections loomed, Mulangala founded the political party UMR (Union pour la Majorité Républicaine) and became the party's President and its candidate for the constituency of Demba in Western Kasai Province. The 2006 election saw Mulangala elected to the National Assembly and five other candidates returned for the party.

During the second round of the presidential poll of that year, the UMR and many other opposition groups supported the candidacy of Jean-Pierre Bemba against the eventual victor and incumbent president, Joseph Kabila.

Following his election at the 2006 polls, Mulangala was in 2007 appointed as Rapporteur to the Economics and Finance Committee of the National Assembly, making him the lead opposition spokesperson on budgetary and economic policy, including policy towards foreign direct investment.

Mulangala founded the UK-DRC All Parliamentary Friendship Group in 2004, and has led important election observation missions on behalf of the DRC or as a member of Africa Union's team including to the United Kingdom's 2005 general election and to the post-conflict general elections in Liberia in 2005 and Sierra Leone in 2007.

=== Presidential and parliamentary elections 2011 ===
In 2010 Mulangala was one of the driving forces behind the move to unite a series of parliamentary opposition and community groups under a single banner in advance of the 2011 presidential and parliamentary elections. This umbrella body, from September 2010 began to work in the National Assembly and organize across the country as a single unit and is called Union Sacree pour L’Alternance (Sacred Union for Change).

In this organization he has been joined by other prominent opposition figures including former RCD leader Ernest Wamba dia Wamba, Eugène Diomi Ndongala, Ne Mwanda Nsemi, Christian Badibangi, Lisanga Jean Pierre, and former President of the National Assembly, Anzuluni Bembe.

Union Sacree pour L’Alternance is expected to agree a single, united candidate to contest the 2011 presidential poll.

Mulangala announced the launch of the new group internationally in an article in the US news outlet Huffington Post in September 2010.

Mulangala has been a key figure amongst both the opposition and in the international media in protesting against the planned changes to the electoral system in DRC for both parliamentary and presidential polls. Under a change of law initiated by President Kabila, the proportional voting system for elections to the National Assembly will be replaced for the 2011 poll by a first-past-the-post system and the presidential poll will be conducted in a single round, rather than the current two-round contest.

In an article in the UK's Prospect Magazine in January 2011, Mulangala stated that "Kabila's reforms threaten to weaken consensus politics in the DRC. After ten years of civil war and a further ten of brittle peace, consensus is crucial and minorities must never be allowed to wield power over the majority”. He also used the article to confirm that the opposition had, however, secured seats in a newly constituted electoral commission to oversee the elections, and that “the importance of a balanced electoral commission cannot be overstated: it was just such a body that finally called the election for opposition leader Ouattara in Cote d’Ivoire”.

During a visit to London in May 2011 Mulangala was invited to address the Institute of Economic Affairs on the future of the Mining and Extractives industry in DRC and how to bring transparency to this crucial industry (the IEA website hosts an MP3 recording of the speech.

During the same visit, Mulangala was interviewed by David Frost on his international interview programme Frost Over the World on the al-Jazeera English news network, becoming the first politician from the Democratic Republic of Congo to be interviewed by the renowned interviewer.

=== Political views and positions ===
Throughout his political career, Mulangala has present consistently centrist and liberal views, first in opposition to the Mobutist regime and then to both Laurent-Desire Kabila and Joseph Kabila's governments. His politics have consistently espoused:

- Citizen-ownership schemes for businesses on a similar model to Black Economic Empowerment schemes in South Africa
- Equal rights for women
- Support for foreign investors to provide their DRC employees with equity/ ownership of local subsidiaries
- Support for the UN mandated forces in Eastern Congo, in order support security in the region, to help guarantee a free and fair election in 2011
- Support for an international transparency and certification initiative for minerals (similar to the Kimberley Process for diamonds), and for this to be monitored in the Eastern Congo by the UN in conjunction with the DRC Government
- Guaranteed basic education for all DRC citizens up to the age of 15
- A programme of national works to improve sanitation and guarantee the right to clean water
- Support for the continuation of the current proportional electoral system for parliamentary contests, and a two-round poll for the presidential election
- Action to ensure DRC abides by international treaties on transparency in legal agreements, and concerns that Chinese investment in DRC may embolden the Government to lessen its commitment to abiding by international legal requirements in business and human rights

=== Career outside politics ===
In 1979 Mulangala joined Citibank in Kinshasa, rising over the years of its operations to Director of the subsidiary and Member of the Credit Committee of the bank. During his service to the financial institution at which he worked until his appointment to the Government as a Cabinet Minister in 1990, he assisted with the development, design and implementation of first money and foreign exchange marketplace in DRC, and export credit lines to mining and extractive companies, including La Générale des Carrières et des Mines, the state-owned mining company.

In 1995 Mulangala became a founding partner of Kaulu Investissement Holding (KIH), a consultancy specialising in bringing foreign investors operating in the international trade finance, mining and petroleum industries to DRC. Mulangala and KIH were crucial to the entry of South African-based oil company Engen to DRC, which ended in the company's temporary withdrawal in 1997 alongside the majority of western investors due to the onset of the First Congo War.

In 2008 the company was appointed as a strategic partner of Afriland First Bank, a Franco-African investment bank for the development of banking operations in Kananga, capital of Kasai Province.

=== Personal life ===
In 1981, Mulangala married Marianne who he had first known in Belgium during his secondary school and university years.

Marianne holds a law diploma from the Université Libre de Bruxelles, ULB, and a business management diploma from London Guildhall University. She is founder and chair of l'Association des Femmes d'Affaires du Congo (AFAC), an organisation for the development and empowerment of Congolese women in business.

They have four children: Vanessa, a TV producer and former broadcast journalist with the BBC World Service, Gregory, a management undergraduate from the University of London employed by a leading international mining company, Andy, adoptive son, sales manager in a marketing company, and Charles Edouard, a senior high school student aspiring to become a paediatrician.
