= Guimbi Ouattara =

West African ruler and military leader

Guimbi Outtara, sometimes Guimbé Ouattara (c. 1836–1919), was a ruler and military leader in what today is the country of Burkina Faso.

Ouattara was the eldest daughter of Diori Ouattara and Makogo Ouattara. Her father died when she was three, and he was succeeded by her younger brother. By the age of 15, Ouattara had been married and widowed three times. She was active in diplomacy with European explorers, receiving Louis-Gustave Binger, François Crozat, and Parfait-Louis Monteil. She participated in a number of military campaigns throughout her career, notably working with Samori Ture, a king from Guinea. She prevented Ture from destroying her people by plying him with gifts and offering him a magic potion.

Ouattara is still remembered today in Bobo-Dioulasso, where both a maternity hospital and a professional school bear her name. Her mausoleum, a modern structure, can also be visited.

== Ouattara and Samori Ture ==
Samori Ture threatened to destroy Ouattara and her kingdom because they shared a homeland with his French enemy Tiéfo. Tiéfo and his kingdom had separated themselves from Ouattara and her people because of religious differences. Ouattara visited Ture to conduct peace negotiations; she brought gifts and added what was described as "a magic potion" to the milk he drank. They spoke of peace and their common enemy, the Tiéfo people, and Ture agreed to an alliance. Together they put down the rebellious Tiéfo; Ouattara was with him when his forces destroyed Noumoudara, and she remained a powerful influence in Bobo-Dioulasso throughout the following years.
