= Ouattara =

Ouattara is a surname or given name, and may refer to:

== Surname ==
- Aboubakar Diaby Ouattara (born 1938), Ivorian diplomat
- Abdoul Guemissongui Ouattara (born 22 October 2005), Ivorian professional footballer
- Abdoul Kader Ouattara (born 26 May 2005), Burkinabé professional footballer
- Alassane Ouattara (born 1942), Ivorian politician
- Alima Ouattara (born 1988), Ivorian pole vaulter
- Amara Ahmed Ouattara (born 1983), Burkinabé footballer
- Aziz Ouattara Mohammed (born 2001), Ivorian professional footballer
- Billy Ouattara (born 1992), Ghanaian/French basketball player
- Boureima Ouattara (born 1984), Burkinabé footballer
- Dango Ouattara (born 2002), a Burkinabé footballer
- Djibril Ouattara (born 1999), Burkinabé footballer
- Fambaré Ouattara Natchaba (born 1945), Togolese politician
- Guimbi Ouattara (1836–1919), ruler of Bobo-Dioulasso
- Issouf Ouattara (born 1988), Burkinabé footballer
- Kouamé Ouattara (born 1991), Ivorian footballer
- Mama Ouattara (1951–2004), Ivorian footballer
- Moussa Ouattara (disambiguation)
- Morou Ouattara, Chef
- Soumaïla Ouattara (born 1995), Burkinabé footballer
- Téné Birahima Ouattara, Ivorian politician and brother of Alassane
- Tiemoko Ouattara (born 2005), Ivorian footballer
- Yakuba Ouattara (born 1992), Ghanaian-French basketball player

== Given name ==
- Ouattara Lagazane (born 1963), Ivorian sprinter
- Ouattara Watts (born 1957), Ivorian painter
