= Bobo-Dioulasso =

City in Houet Province, Burkina Faso

Bobo-Dioulasso Bɔbɔjulaso (Dyula)
- City
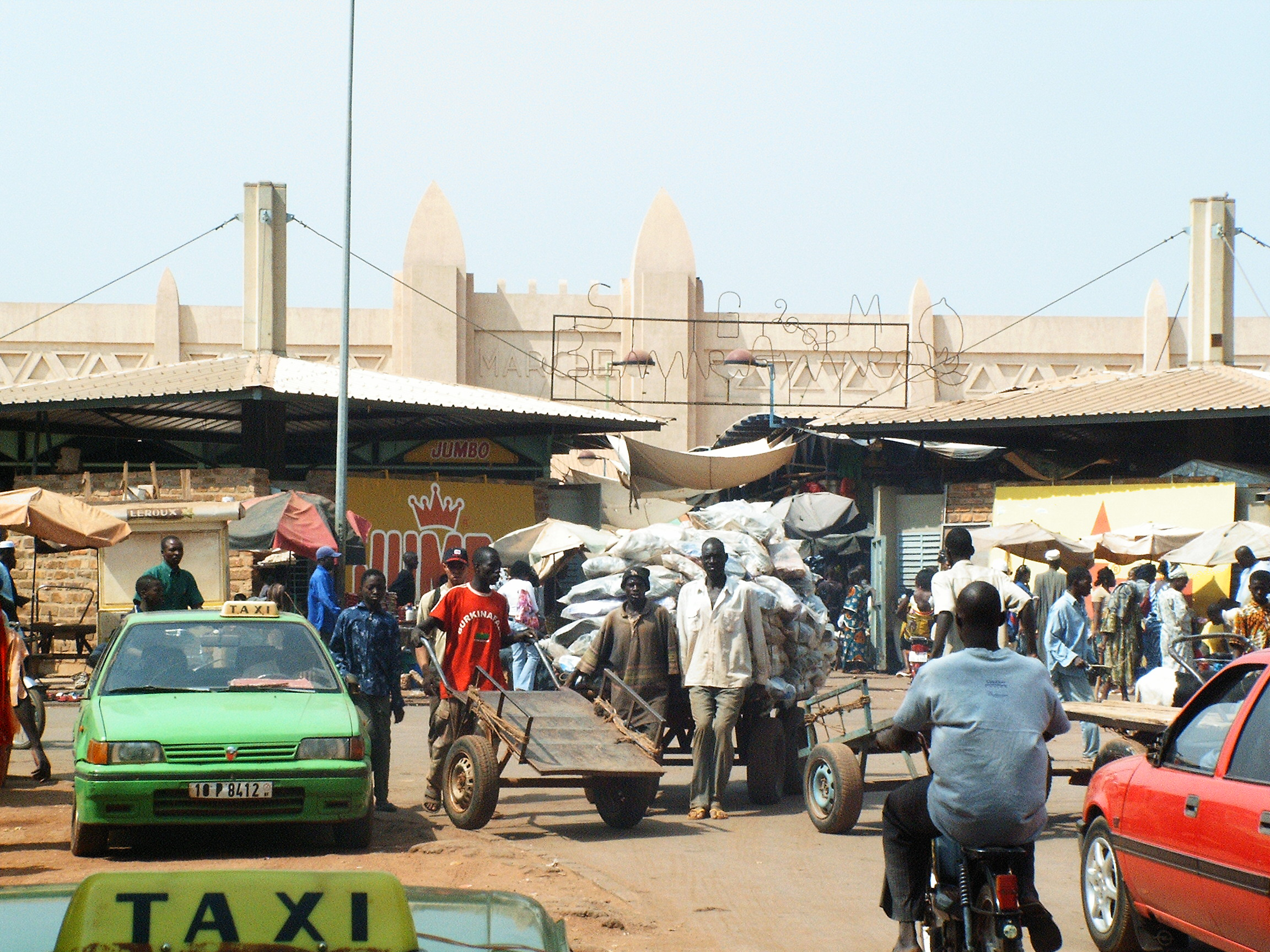
- Bobo-Dioulasso marketplace, 2006

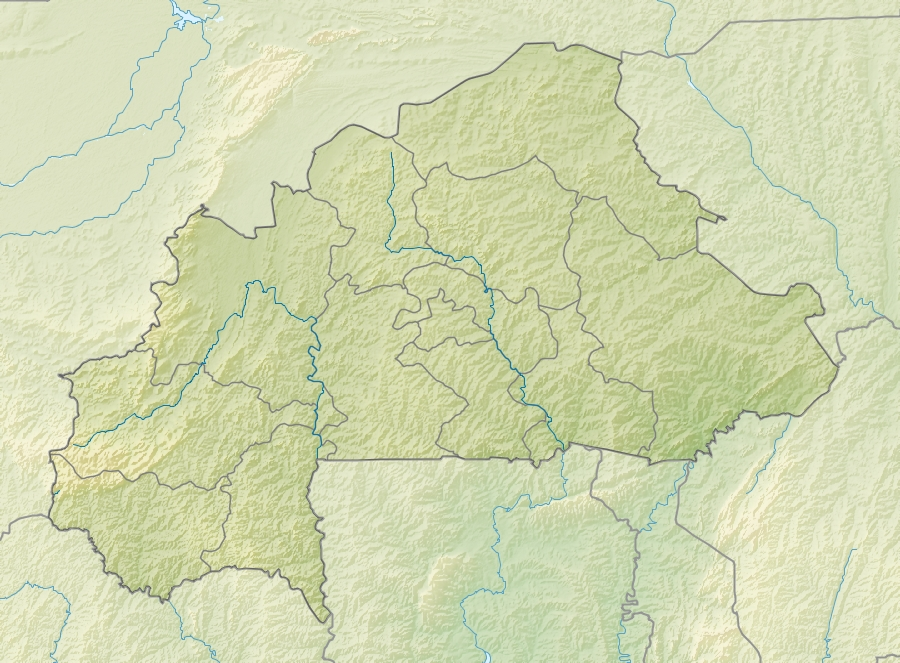
- Location within Burkina Faso
- Coordinates: 11°09′53″N 4°18′18″W
- Country: Burkina Faso
- Region: Guiriko Region
- Province: Houet Province
- Founded: 15th century

Area
  - Total: 136.78 km^{2} (52.81 sq mi)
- Elevation: 445 m (1,460 ft)

Population (2023 census)
  - Total: 1,129,000
  - Density: 8,254/km^{2} (21,380/sq mi)
- Time zone: UTC+00:00 (GMT)
- Area code: +226 20
- Climate: Aw
- Website: bobodioulasso.net

Bobo-Dioulasso (Dyula: Bɔbɔjulaso N'Ko script: ߓߐ߬ߓߐߖߎ߬ߟߊ߬ߛߏ߫, Mossi: Sɩa) (often colloquially called Bobo) is a city in Burkina Faso with a population of 1,129,000 (as of 2023); it is the second-largest city in the country, after Ouagadougou, Burkina Faso's capital. The name means "home of the Bobo-Dioula".

The local Bobo-speaking population (related to the Mande) refers to the city simply as Sia. There are two distinct dialects of Jula spoken, based on the origins of different groups of speakers. The city is situated in the southwest of the country, in the Houet Province, some 350 km (220 mi) from Ouagadougou. Bobo-Dioulasso is significant both economically (agricultural trade, textile industry) and culturally, as it is a major center of culture and music.

== History ==
Consasso: the first house of Sya, the original core of Bobo-Dioulasso, in 2001.

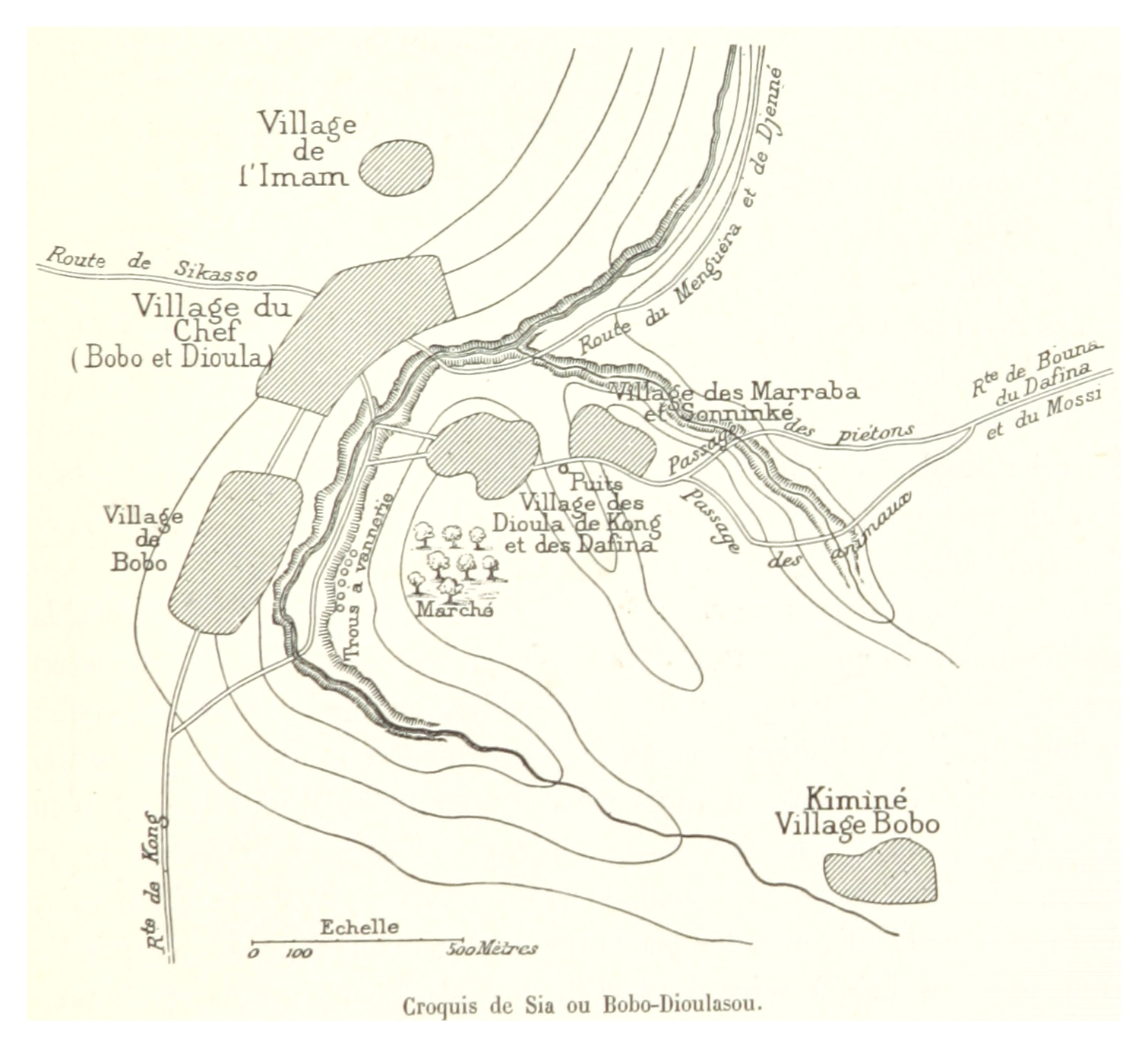
Map of Sia, now Bobo-Dioulassou, from Louis Gustave Binger: Du Niger au Golfe de Guinée, par le pays de Kong et le Mossi, 1892

=== Early history ===
According to local tradition, Bobo-Dioulasso was founded as Sia in the 15th century. Populated by the Oule and Dioula subgroups of the Bobo people, it became an important market center, particularly in the export of horses southwards. Sia was therefore an important link in the developing trade routes linking Djenne and the Inner Niger Delta to Kong, Begho and ultimately the Gold Coast.

=== Kong Empire ===
Kong's growing influence in the region culminated in the reign of Seku Watara, who established the Kong Empire in 1710. His brother Famagan Watara and sons Kere-Mori and Bamba Watara played important roles in conquering Sia and subjugating the native Bobo-Dioula and Bobo-Oule in the late 1730s. After Seku's death, however, Famagan's descendants ruled the region, known as Gwiriko, with near-autonomy from the senior branch based in Kong.

At the end of the nineteenth century, Sia consisted of two large villages, Tunuma and Sia proper, located a few hundred meters from each other and bounded by 3-to-4.5-metre-deep (10–15-foot) ravines on either side, carved by the We (Houët) river to the east and by its tributary Sanyo to the west. Three small satellite villages were located beyond this natural border. A number of other independent villages in the surroundings (Bindogoso, Dogona, Kwirima, Kpa) have since been absorbed by the developing city and are now within its municipal boundaries.

Kongondinn and Yemori, Watara rulers of the city, fought a series of wars against the Kenedougou Kingdom to the west in the 1870s, 80s and 90s.

=== Colonial Period ===
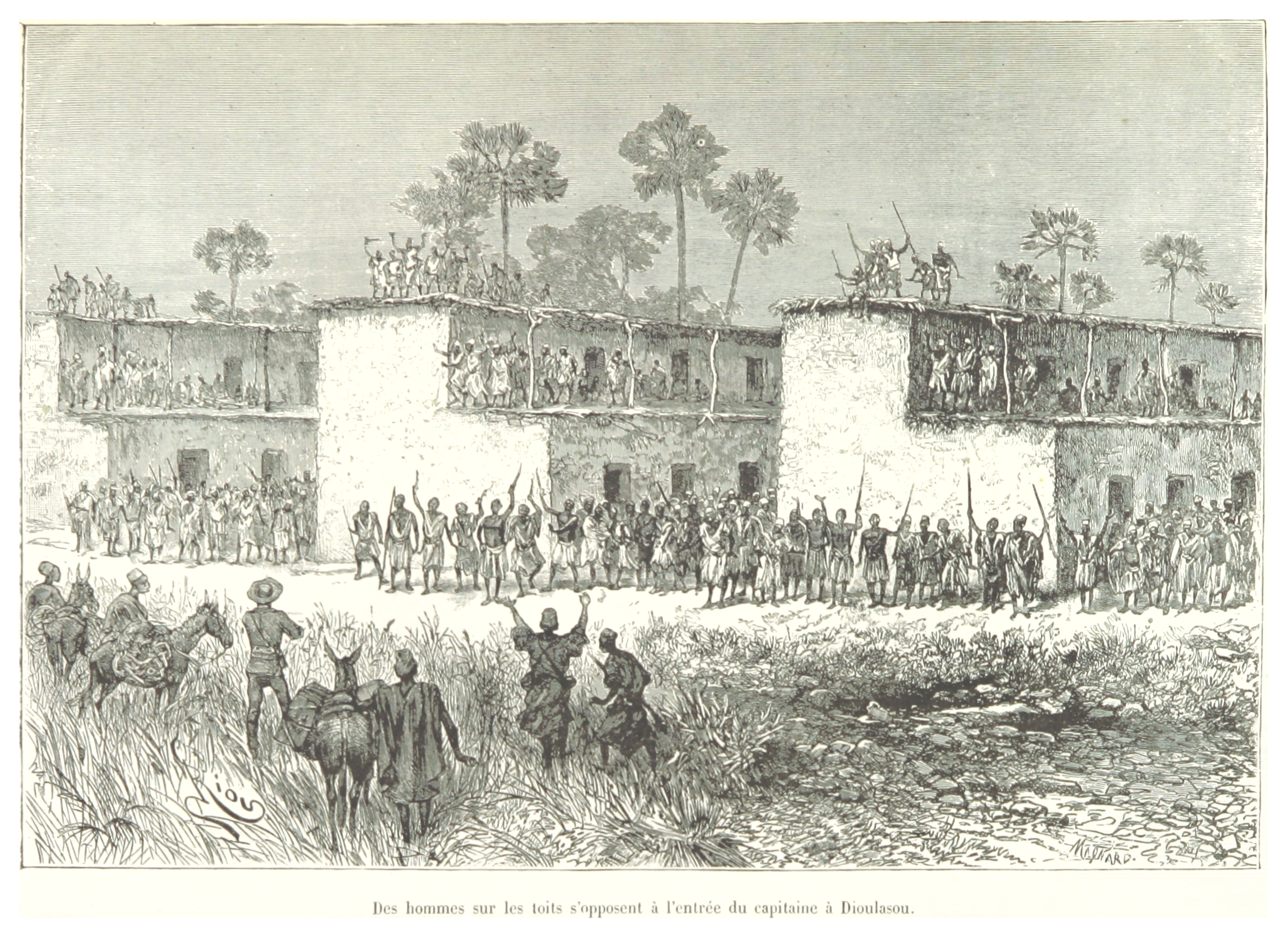
Opposition on roofs to the French captain's entry into Bobo-Diolasso, from Louis Gustave Binger: Du Niger au Golfe de Guinée, par le pays de Kong et le Mossi, 1892.

In 1896 the Bobo-Dioula, rebelling against the Watara, allied with Samory Toure in his attack on their traditional overlords, helping him to capture the nearby stronghold of Noumoudara. The local Watara leader Pintyeba appealed for help from the French, who were already established in Diebougou. On September 25, 1897, the French briefly occupied Sia after a brief but bloody confrontation. On November 23 a military post was established, and later an administrative settlement on the east side of the We River. This became the headquarters of a district (cercle) of the same name, Bobo-Dioulasso. This military post was the starting point for one of the columns aiming to capture Sikasso, capital of Kenedougou, in April 1898.

During the 1915–16 Volta-Bani anti-colonial war, the population in the north and east of district Bobo-Dioulasso took up arms against the French colonial government. The French based their activities in the city in an effort to suppress the insurrection, while the city itself became a center for the organization of the suppression. A colonial military base was established in the southern sector of the city, adding to its growing importance.

In 1927 the French razed the old village of Tunuma and the other settlements; their population was relocated either to neighboring villages or to a previously farmed empty zone three kilometres (two miles) away. It was made available for redevelopment as a residential neighborhood (the current neighborhood of Tounouma).

Sia proper, which survives today as the Dioulasoba neighborhood, was partly spared this total destruction. It was dramatically modified in 1932 when a large road artery was built through it and by the widening of streets in successive urban renewal projects. Between 1926 and 1929, the French colonial government constructed a typical European grid pattern of new avenues and streets in the city, intersected by diagonals radiating from a center, with square urban lots between them. This established the framework for the modern city center.

The Abidjan Railway reached Bobo-Dioulasso in 1934, increasing its access to markets, transportation, and communications. But the growth of the city as a colonial industrial center halted because of the world economic crisis during the Great Depression, as well as the suppression of the colony of Upper Volta in 1933. The city started expanding again after World War II. Reorganization of the colony of Upper Volta in 1947 attracted business to Bobo-Dioulasso, although Ouagadougou had been selected as the capital. An early industrial center, Bobo-Dioulasso is also the hub of a rich agricultural zone, which produces food grains, fruits and seedlings (mangos, citrus), and export crops (cotton, cashews, and shea butter).

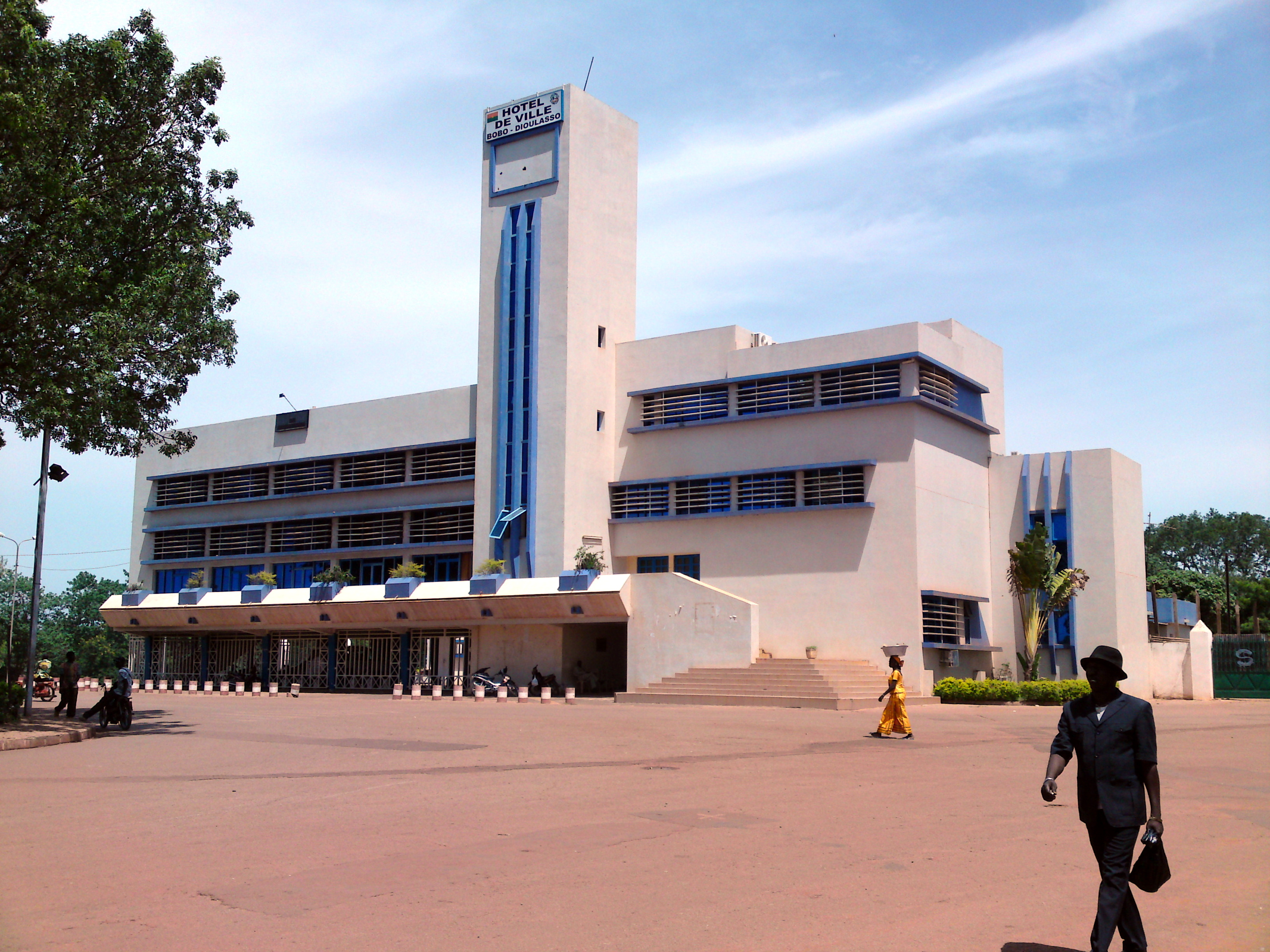
"Hotel de ville", Bobo-Dioulasso townhall, 2013.

=== Independence ===
Due to its strong economic contributions, following the nation's gaining independence in 1960, the city was called "the economic capital of the country" (as opposed to the administrative capital, Ouagadougou). Bobo-Dioulasso's economic advantage vis-à-vis the capital has declined following decades of government policy favoring Ouagadougou. Little new industry arrived in the city during the 1980s and 1990s. Some enterprises either closed down or relocated to the capital. Economic life was primarily reduced to commerce grounded in the agriculture of the region and services.

Since 2000 the city of Bobo-Dioulasso has enjoyed a new growth spurt, gaining in population and economic vitality. Residents have returned home following the internal crisis in neighboring Ivory Coast, and the economy has been stimulated by new demands for its goods. The central government has invested more development funds in the city; for example, the new West African Centre for Economic and Social Studies is a college intended as the first piece of development of the second university of the country.

== Architecture ==
The city features historic buildings reflecting its complex past:

- Konsa house, the ritual center of a senior house of the Zara (or Bobo-Jula) group.
- Dafra, a sacred natural pond and the source of the We River, in its southern quarter. The pond is a site of pilgrimage. People make offerings consumed by the giant catfish living in it.
- the mausoleum of Guimbi Ouattara, a notable ruler of Bobo-Dioulasso in the nineteenth and twentieth centuries.

Bobo-Dioulasso has well-preserved examples of the colonial-era architecture in what is called "neo-Sudanic" style (examples: the museum building, the train station). A regional museum interprets the long history and artifacts recovered in archeological work. A zoo and a pottery market are among the city's attractions.

== Education ==
The École française André Malraux, a French international school, has maternelle (preschool) through collège served.

The Nazi Boni University is located in the city and was founded in 1995.

== Places of worship ==
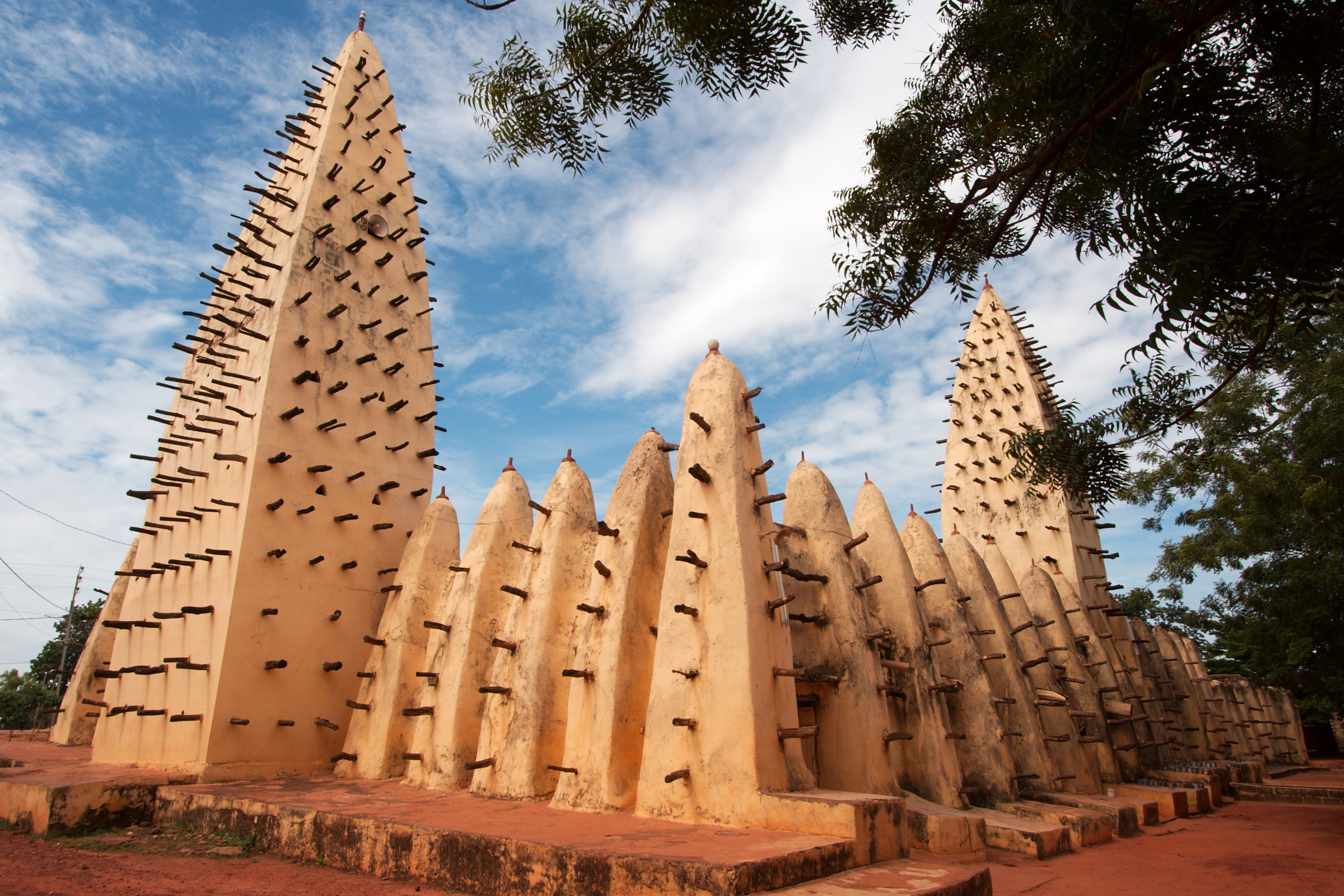
Grand Mosque of Bobo-Dioulasso

Among the places of worship, they are predominantly Muslim mosques. There are also Christian churches and temples: Roman Catholic Archdiocese of Bobo-Dioulasso (Catholic Church), Association of Reformed Evangelical Church of Burkina Faso (World Communion of Reformed Churches), Assemblies of God, Deeper Life Bible Church, International Evangelism Center).

The Grand Mosque of Bobo-Dioulasso is possibly the largest example of Sudano-Sahelian architecture in the country, built in 1880 according to some, 1893 according to others as a part of political agreement between the king of Sya and Islamic religious leader Almamy Sidiki Sanou.

== Transportation ==
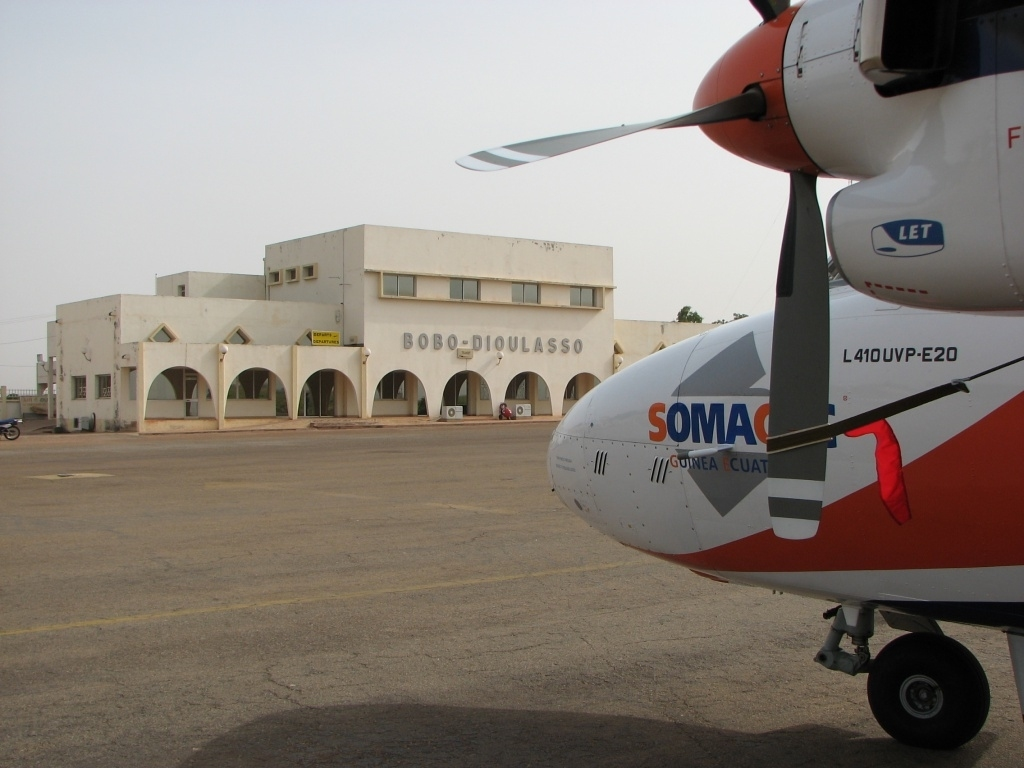
The Bobo Dioulasso Airport, 2009.

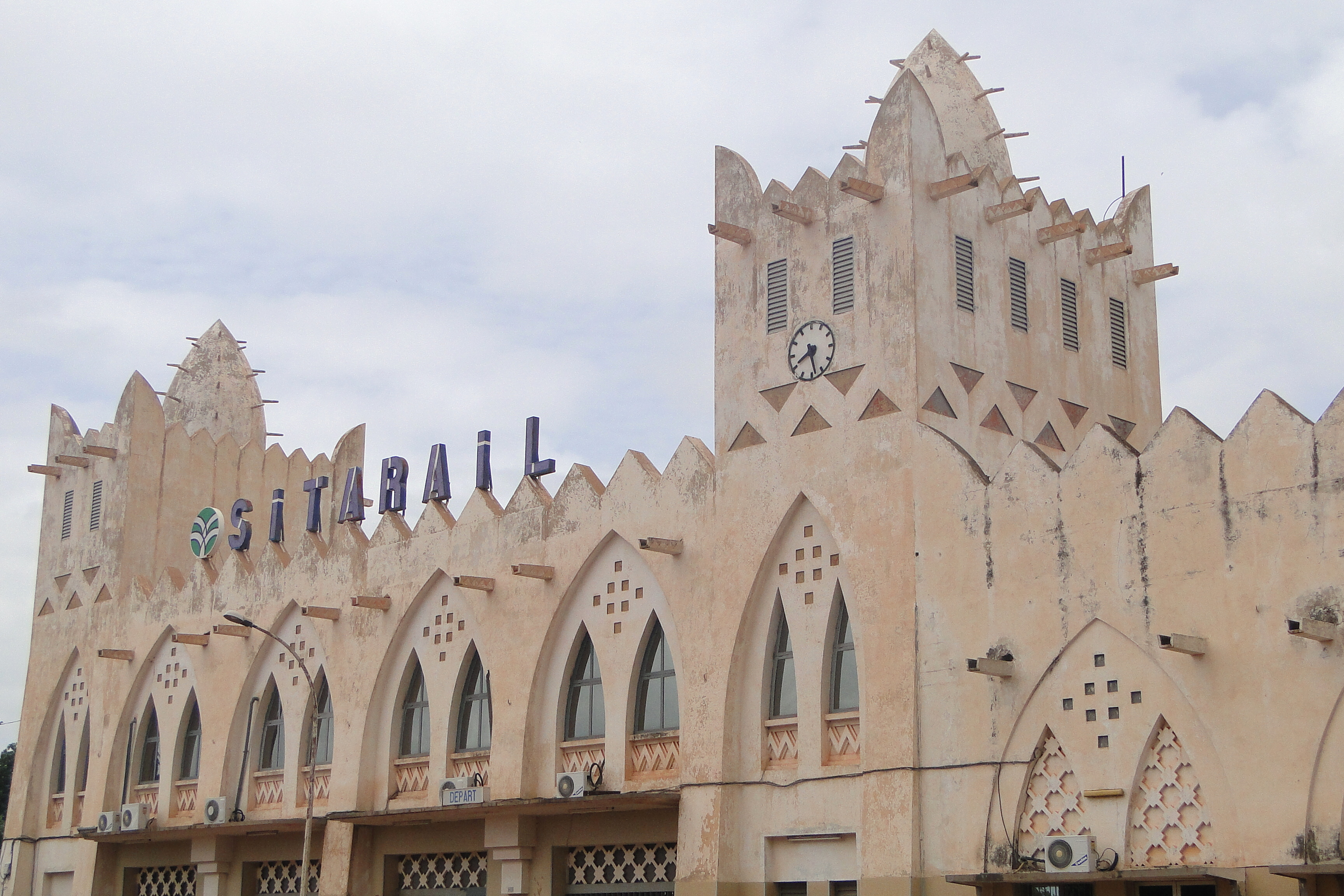
"Sitarail". The Bobo Dioulasso railway station, built during the colonial era in the Sudano-Sahelian style, 2012.

The city has a railroad station along the Abidjan – Ouagadougou Railway. As of June 2014 Sitarail operated a passenger train along the line three times a week in each direction. As of August 2015 Bobo Dioulasso Airport had direct flights twice a week to both Abidjan and Ouagadougou. The city is an important road junction connecting all of Southwestern Burkina Faso with the capital, Ouagadougou, via the N-1 roadway.

== Demographics ==
The original population of Bobo-Dioulasso consisted of a majority of farmers speaking the Bobo language. Associated with them were groups specializing in trade and warfare; they also speak Bobo, but identify as of distinct historical origin and ethnicity. They call themselves the Zara.

Today Bobo-Dioulasso is ethnically and linguistically very diverse, due both to its position as an old trade town, and especially to its growth during the twentieth century as a colonial administrative and military center. Jula (also called Dioula) is the lingua franca of Bobo and surrounding region of western Burkina Faso. People of the city and region speak two distinctive dialects of Jula. The common (and now dominant) Jula spoken in the streets of Bobo-Dioulasso is a close variation of Bamana, the majority language of neighboring Mali.

It was brought to the area during the French colonial administration (1898–1960) by the government interpreters and by the soldiers of the colonial army, who were majority speakers of this language. Most people speak this Jula as a second language, after the official language of French. The people of Jula ethnicity, whether trader, Muslim-clerical, or warrior origin, speak a different dialect of Jula. It is similar to that spoken in Ivory Coast, from where their ancestors are believed to have come. In the city this dialect is called Kon-Jula; it is an ethnic marker of a particular community.

The population of the city keeps rapidly rising; it rose from 904,920 in 2019 to 1,129,000 in 2023.

== Climate ==
Classified by the Köppen-Geiger system Bobo-Dioulasso has a tropical wet and dry climate (Aw). During its hottest months, its temperatures are slightly less hot than the more northern capital, Ouagadougou. The city has a dry season that spans from October through April while the wet season covers the remaining five months. The city experiences its highest temperatures during the dry season with average highs routinely exceeding 38 °C (100 °F). However, humidity is markedly lower during that season so the apparent temperature is more reflective of the actual temperature. The wet season in contrast features lower temperatures but much higher humidity. The apparent temperature during the wet season at times can exceed the apparent temperature during the dry season despite the lower temperatures. Bobo-Dioulasso on average sees roughly 1,000 mm (40 in) of precipitation annually.

Climate data for Bobo-Dioulasso (1991–2020, extremes 1936–present)
Month	Jan	Feb	Mar	Apr	May	Jun	Jul	Aug	Sep	Oct	Nov	Dec	Year
Record high °C (°F)	39.7 (103.5)	41.2 (106.2)	46.0 (114.8)	42.0 (107.6)	41.0 (105.8)	38.6 (101.5)	36.5 (97.7)	35.6 (96.1)	35.6 (96.1)	37.5 (99.5)	38.0 (100.4)	37.5 (99.5)	46.0 (114.8)
Mean daily maximum °C (°F)	33.1 (91.6)	35.9 (96.6)	37.8 (100.0)	37.4 (99.3)	35.4 (95.7)	32.7 (90.9)	30.6 (87.1)	29.8 (85.6)	31.0 (87.8)	33.5 (92.3)	34.9 (94.8)	33.5 (92.3)	33.8 (92.8)
Daily mean °C (°F)	25.9 (78.6)	28.8 (83.8)	31.1 (88.0)	30.8 (87.4)	29.3 (84.7)	27.3 (81.1)	25.7 (78.3)	25.0 (77.0)	25.6 (78.1)	27.2 (81.0)	27.9 (82.2)	26.3 (79.3)	27.6 (81.7)
Mean daily minimum °C (°F)	19.1 (66.4)	22.0 (71.6)	24.7 (76.5)	25.2 (77.4)	24.2 (75.6)	22.7 (72.9)	21.8 (71.2)	21.5 (70.7)	21.5 (70.7)	22.1 (71.8)	21.4 (70.5)	19.4 (66.9)	22.1 (71.9)
Record low °C (°F)	11.0 (51.8)	11.0 (51.8)	11.5 (52.7)	13.0 (55.4)	15.2 (59.4)	17.5 (63.5)	17.0 (62.6)	16.7 (62.1)	15.5 (59.9)	16.7 (62.1)	12.8 (55.0)	10.0 (50.0)	10.0 (50.0)
Average precipitation mm (inches)	0.7 (0.03)	1.7 (0.07)	17.1 (0.67)	53.7 (2.11)	98.3 (3.87)	132.6 (5.22)	207.3 (8.16)	269.0 (10.59)	195.5 (7.70)	71.6 (2.82)	5.8 (0.23)	0.7 (0.03)	1,054 (41.50)
Average precipitation days (≥ 1.0 mm)	0.2	0.1	1.3	4.0	7.7	9.1	13.1	15.5	13.6	6.9	0.8	0.1	72.4
Average relative humidity (%)	25	25	32	49	63	72	78	82	79	69	51	32	55
Mean monthly sunshine hours	277.4	250.0	248.1	227.4	247.6	225.8	206.9	178.3	208.0	266.4	284.8	279.2	2,899.9
Percentage possible sunshine	80	76	67	63	68	62	51	48	58	70	79	75	66
Source 1: World Meteorological Organization
Source 2: Deutscher Wetterdienst (extremes, humidity 1951–1967, and percent sunshine 1961–1990) (Note: Station ID for Bobo-Dioulasso is 65510 Use this station ID to locate the sunshine duration)

== Notable people ==
- Ibrahim Sory Sanlé (b. 1943), photographer
- Gaston Kaboré (b. 1951), film director
- Moumouni Fabre (b. 1953), politician and diplomat
- Adama Dramé (b. 1954), musician
- Cheikh Lô (b. 1955), musician
- Dani Kouyaté (b. 1961), film director and griot
- Sékou Traoré (b. 1962), film director
- Alain Traoré (b. 1988), footballer (Arta/Solar7)
- Charles Kaboré (b. 1988), footballer
- Bertrand Traoré (b. 1995), footballer (Sunderland)
- Lassina Traoré (b. 2001), footballer (Shakhtar Donetsk)
- Issa Kaboré (b. 2001), footballer (Manchester City)
- Nasser Djiga (b. 2002), footballer (Rangers)
- Gustavo Sangaré (b. 1996), footballer (FC Noah)
- Zakaria Sanogo (b. 1996), footballer (FC Alashkert)
- Cheick Sanou (b. 1992), strongman

== Gallery ==
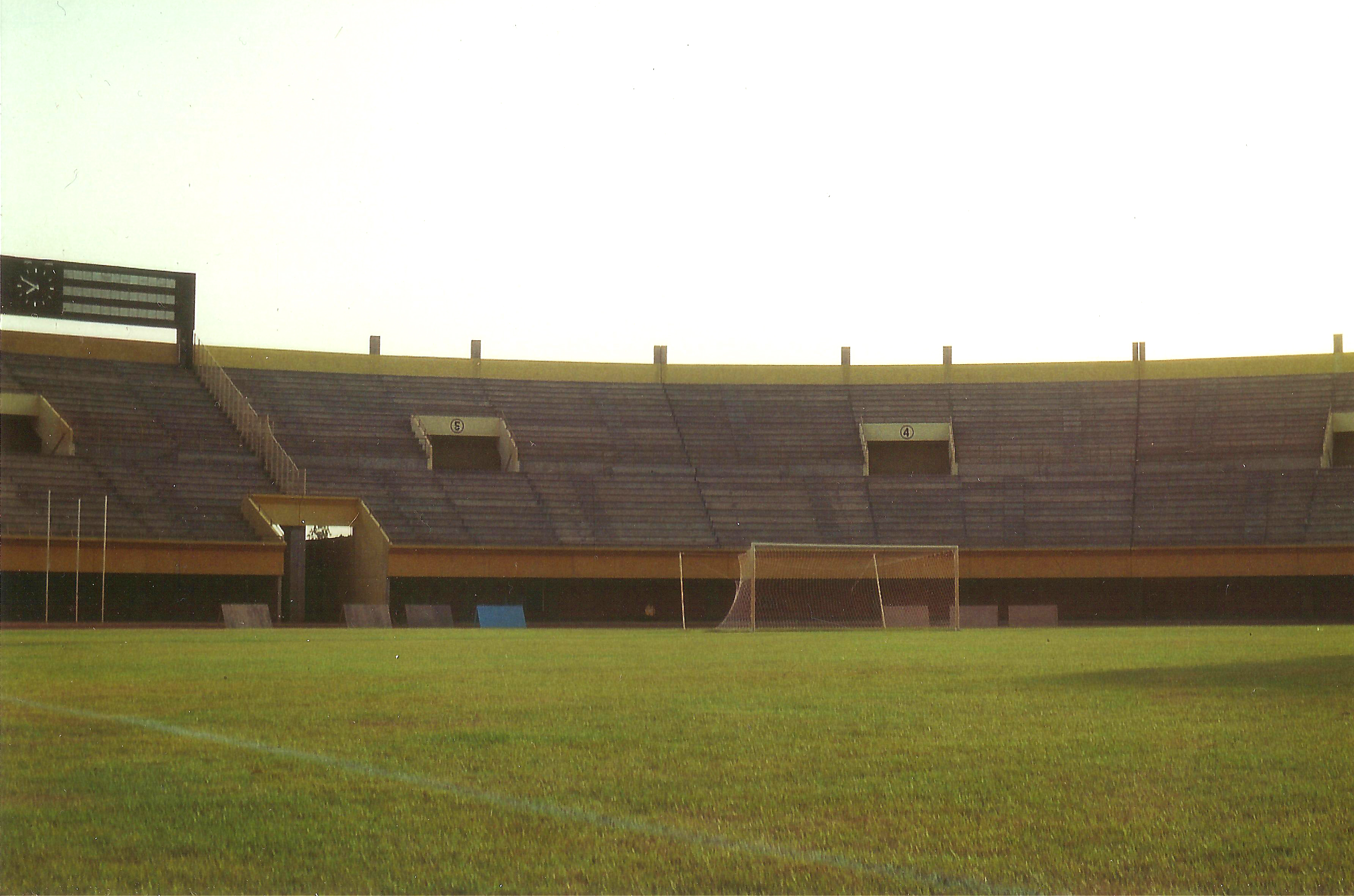
Stade Général Aboubacar Sangoulé Lamizana. Stadium, 1999

Detail of a clay minaret of the Great Mosque in Bobo-Dioulasso, 2001

An iron smith in the blacksmith quarter is working indoors on a sickle with a hammer, 2001

Low square loam stone houses with trees on the bank of the river with sacred fish, Bobo-Dioulasso, 2001

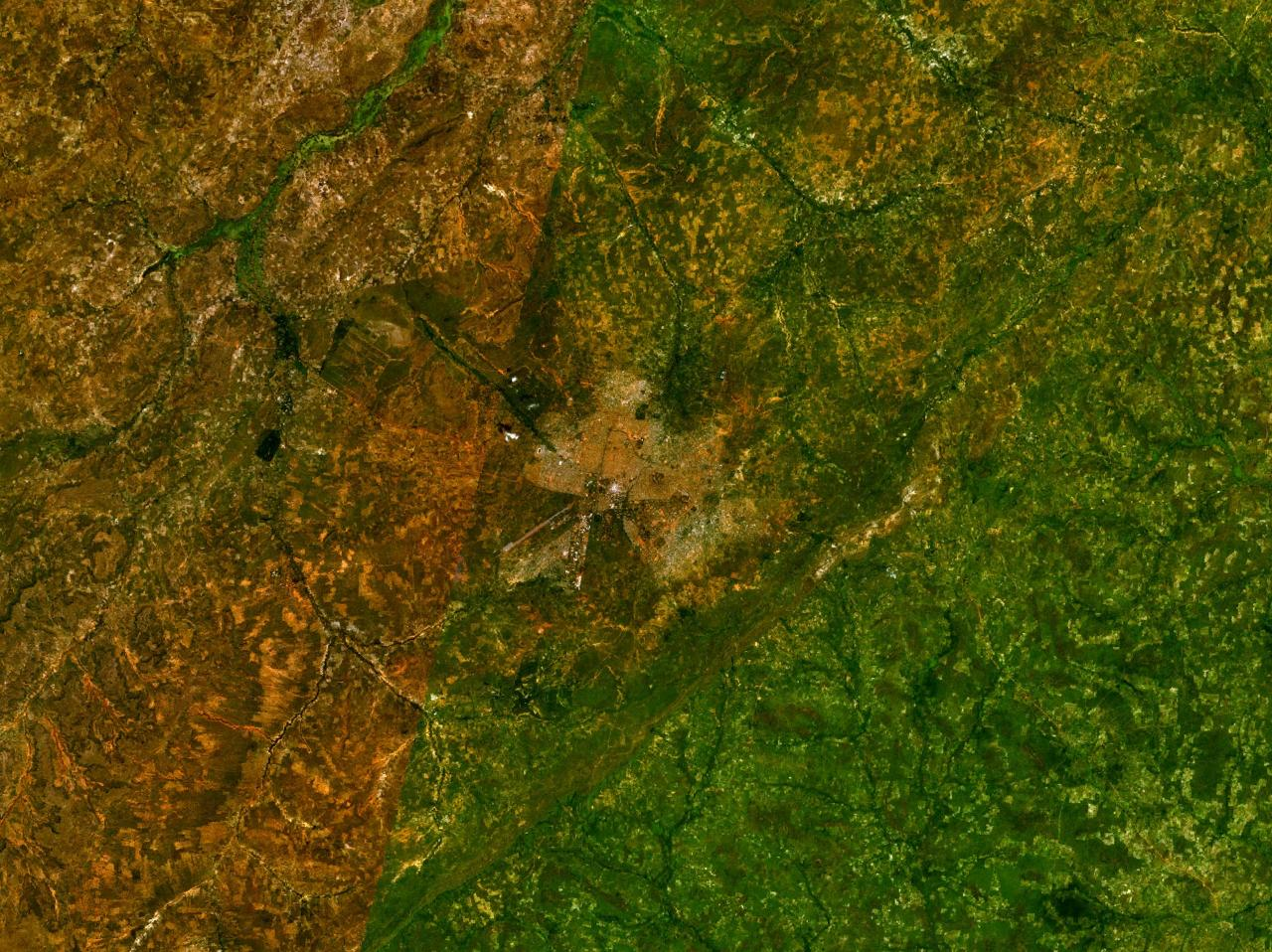
World Wind satellite imagery of Bobo-Dioulasso, 2005 or earlier?

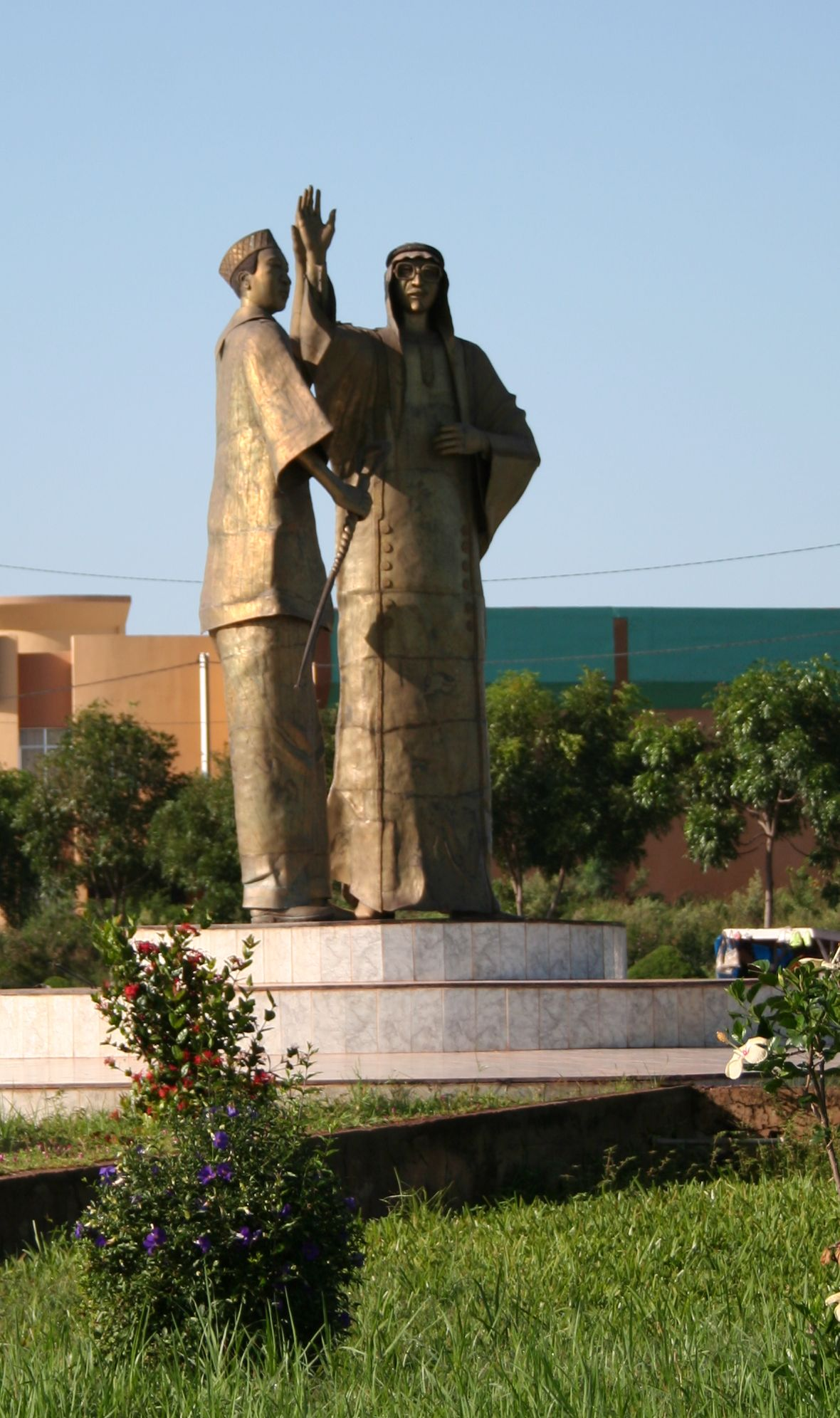
Monument. A huge statue of two people, Bobo-Dioulasso, 2006

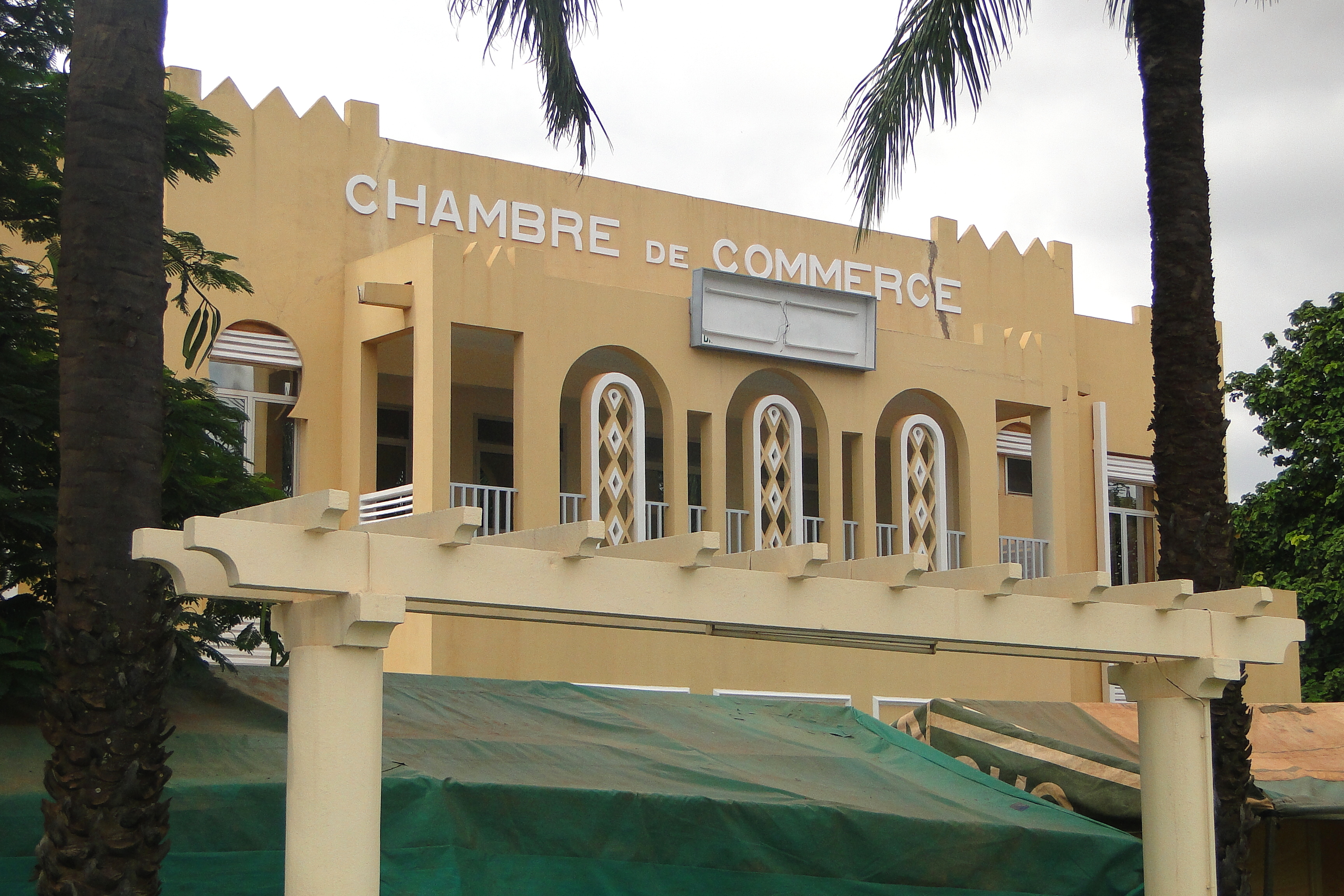
Chamber of Commerce Building, 2010

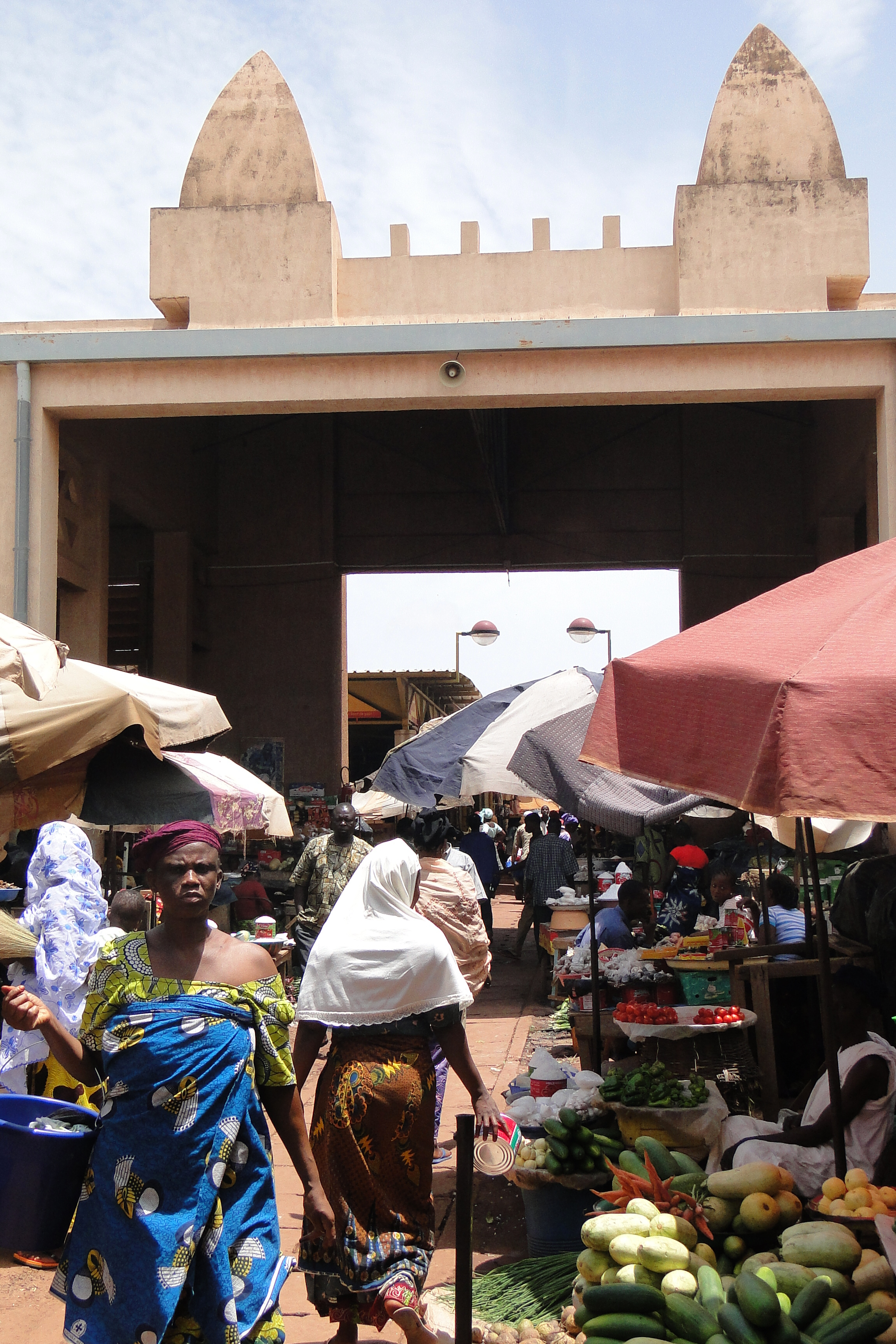
Market scene in Bobo-Dioulasso, 2010

== See also ==
- List of cities in Burkina Faso
