= Laura Schwartz =

American author and television commentator (born 1973)

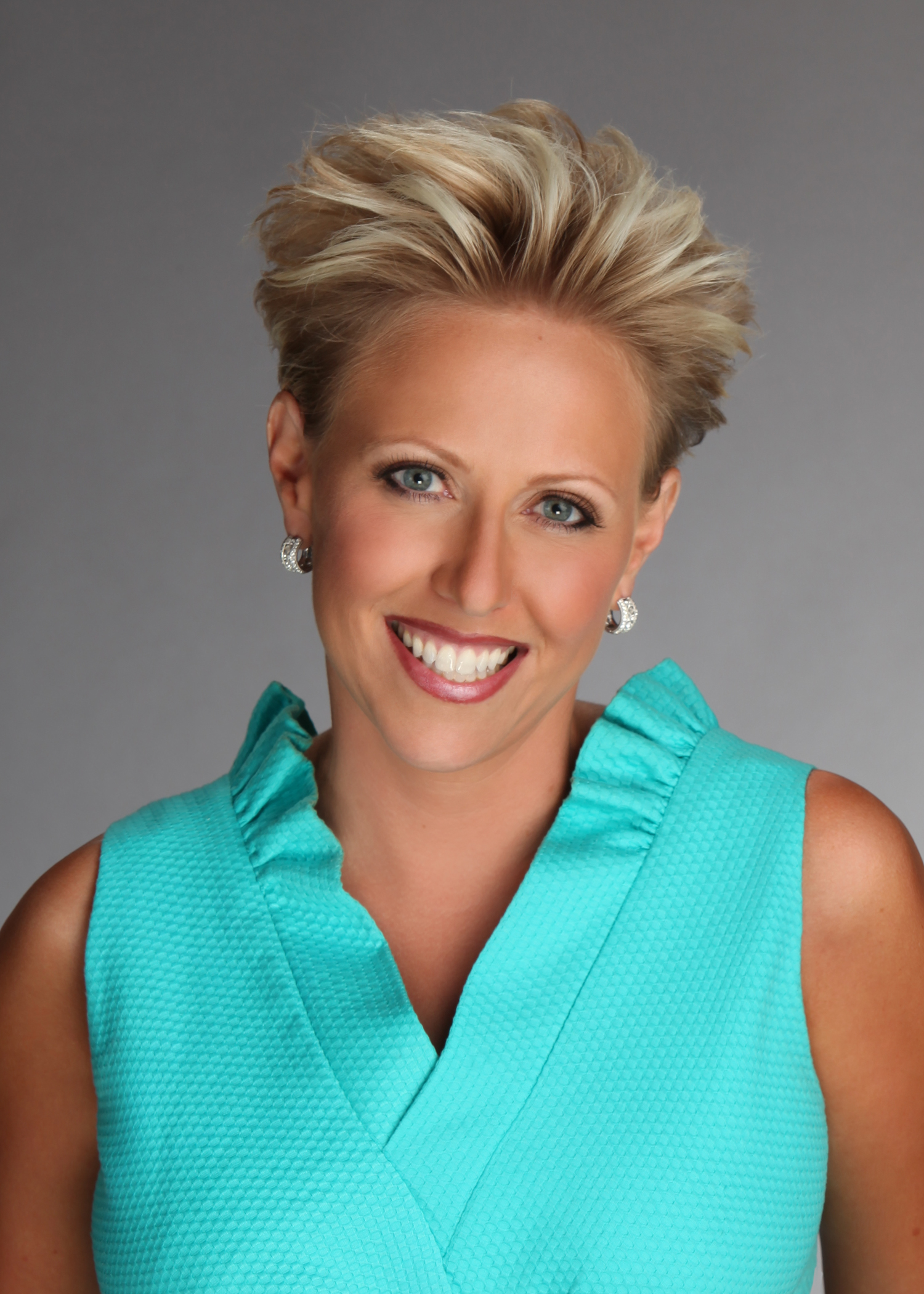
- Schwartz in August 2011
- Born: April 19, 1973 (age 53); Plymouth, Wisconsin, U.S.
- Education: St. Norbert College
- Occupations: Speaker, author, television personality
- Years active: 1993–present
- Known for: Serving as the White House Director of Events, the Clinton Administration
- Website: http://www.WhiteHouseStrategies.com/

Laura Schwartz (born April 19, 1973) is an American professional speaker, author and television commentator. She served as an on-air contributor for the Fox News Channel from 2004 to 2007 and as a special correspondent for CNN’s Larry King Live during the presidential primaries from the fall of 2007 to the summer of 2008. She covered the 2008 presidential election for the CBS Early Show and gives frequent commentary on the BBC and Sir David Frost’s Frost Over The World.

Schwartz worked for the Clinton administration for eight years, beginning as a volunteer and eventually becoming the White House Director of Events. Her most notable positions were as the Midwest Press Secretary, Director of Television and White House Director of Events.

== Early life and education ==
Schwartz was born and raised in Plymouth, Wisconsin and attended Plymouth High School where she graduated in 1991. Her parents owned a photography studio in town and the family’s life was spent working in the studio and being active in the community. She attended St. Norbert College and the American University.

== White House years ==
Schwartz began volunteering at the White House in the Clinton administration the day after his inauguration in 1993. She was 19 years of age at the time and attending American University. She answered telephones in the press office and was hired later that summer as a Staff Assistant and the youngest woman to be appointed to a position within the administration. Subsequently, she became the Midwest Press Secretary, Director of Television, and Director of Events. During her time as the Director of Events, she was responsible for over 1,000 White House events, including the 50th Anniversary Celebration of NATO. She finished her last few months in the White House as the Special Advisor to the Chief of Staff. She worked all eight years of the Clinton Administration.

- 1993: Staff Assistant, Office of the Press Secretary
- 1994–1995: Midwest Press Secretary, Office of the Press Secretary
- 1995–1998: Director of Television, Office of the Press Secretary
- 1998–2000: Director of Events, White House Social Office
- 2000–2001: Special Advisor to the White House Chief of Staff, Office of the Chief of Staff

After the White House, Schwartz traveled with President Clinton for his lecture series and foundation work, and she began speaking professionally and appearing on television. She founded her company White House Strategies in Chicago in 2001. She also served as a senior advisor to the 2004 Presidential campaign of former Senator John Kerry and Trip Director to Teresa Kerry.

== Television ==
Schwartz is an international television commentator having been a contributor at the Fox News Channel, CBS News and The Early Show, and CNN’s Larry King Live. She also appears on the BBC and Sir David Frost’s Frost Over the World. Since 2020, Schwartz has been a regular contributor to the Australian National morning shows on Channel 9, Today and Today Extra, often commenting on political news from USA.

From 2004 through 2007, Schwartz was an on-air contributor for the Fox News Channel. She appeared weekly on different Fox News Channel programs including The O'Reilly Factor, Hannity & Colmes and The Cost of Freedom. In 2007, Schwartz went to CNN as a special correspondent for Larry King Live. She covered the presidential primary elections through the summer of 2008. After CNN, Schwartz was a contributor to the CBS Early Show with her segment Trail Mix for the 2008 Presidential election and covered the inauguration of President Barack Obama.

== Author and professional speaker ==
Schwartz is the author of the book Eat, Drink, and Succeed. Published in 2010 by the Black Ox Press, the book gives specific examples of how a business can use networking opportunities to advance their business. In the book, Schwartz draws on her experience in the White House and the lessons that she learned during her time in the administration and growing up in a family business. Schwartz is also a well-known professional speaker. She presents before audiences of Fortune 500 companies, professional industry associations and annual conferences in the US and abroad.

== Awards and recognitions ==
Schwartz has been the recipient of numerous awards and recognitions over her career. She was named as one of the 100 Most Influential Women in Chicago by Today’s Chicago Woman Magazine in 2011, and also one of Chicago’s 5 Most Bold and Beautiful by Chicago Magazine in 2010. She was honored by American University in 2007 with the Leadership in Education Award. In 2009, she was invited to speak at the Oxford Union where she discussed foreign policy and the role of women in the world and in 2012 she was the recipient of the Steve Kemble Leadership Foundation Award. She was honored on September 28, 2012 when she was formally inducted into the Plymouth School District Hall of Fame.

== Personal life ==
Schwartz is involved in various forms of philanthropy including the giving of her time and money to various organizations. In 2012, she donated her fee for writing a column for the Chicago Sun-Times to Clean the World. She serves on the advocacy board of the American Heart Association and emcees their Chicago Heart Walks and Go Red Luncheons. She also volunteers her time with the YWCA and the United Way. She serves on the board for the Illinois Institute of Art and Event Solutions Magazine and is also involved in Step Up Women’s Network and the Ronald McDonald House Charities.
