= Frost Over the World =

Frost Over the World is a television interview and news talk show, with Sir David Frost as host. The show was broadcast on Al Jazeera English. Frost, a famed English television presenter, interviewed well-known politicians, diplomats, writers, thinkers, academics, entertainers, business leaders, scientists, humanitarians, and other newsmakers. The editor of the programme was the journalist Charlie Courtauld and producers include Richard Brock, Kate Newman, Alex Nunes and Portia Walker.

The show launched in November 2006 and Britain's then Prime Minister, Tony Blair, was the first guest to appear.

The show was replaced by The Frost Interview on Al Jazeera English. Unlike Frost Over the World, which was set in a studio, The Frost Interview involved David Frost travelling around the world. Frost hosted that show until his death in 2013.

== Guests ==
There have been many high-profile guests on the show. Guests have included:

- Aron Ralston
- Abdiweli Mohamed Ali
- Abhisit Vejjajiva
- Akbar Ahmed
- Alan Dershowitz
- Alex Salmond
- Aloe Blacc
- Álvaro Uribe
- Amitabh Bachchan
- Anders Fogh Rasmussen
- Andrew Eborn - President Octopus TV
- Andy Murray
- Angela Gheorghiu
- Annie Lennox
- Anthony Hopkins
- Ban Ki-moon
- Barbara Stocking
- Benazir Bhutto
- Bonnie Greer
- Benjamin Netanyahu
- Bill Gates
- Boutros Boutros-Ghali
- Charlie Wolf
- Christian Louboutin
- Christina Ricci
- Christopher Hitchens
- Cuba Gooding, Jr.
- Dambisa Moyo
- Daniel Junge
- Daniel Ortega
- David Cameron
- David Miliband
- David Petraeus
- Dennis Kucinich
- Dennis Ross
- Derren Brown
- Desmond Tutu
- Dominique de Villepin
- Donald Rumsfeld
- Doug Wead
- Douglas Hurd
- Eduard Limonov
- Emeli Sandé
- Emilio Barbarani
- Eoin Colfer
- Evo Morales
- F. W. de Klerk
- Fawzia Koofi
- Frank Luntz
- Garry Kasparov
- Gary Lightbody
- Gene Robinson
- George Clooney
- George H. W. Bush
- Gilbert & George
- Hamid Karzai
- Hamish McRae
- Harry Shearer
- Hatem Saif El Nasr
- Helen Clark
- Helen Mirren
- Henry Kissinger
- Hina Rabbani Khar
- Imran Khan
- Íngrid Betancourt
- Jacob Zuma
- Jean-Claude Juncker
- Jeffrey Sachs
- Jeremy Clarkson
- Jerry Springer
- Jimmy Wales
- Johan Galtung
- John Bradley
- Jorge Castañeda Gutman
- John Major
- Juan Manuel Santos
- John McCain
- Julia Gillard
- Julian Assange
- Julian Zelizer
- Jyrki Katainen
- Kate Nash
- Kristin Scott Thomas
- Laura Schwartz
- Laurie Penny
- Lawrence Freedman
- Léa Seydoux
- Lewis Hamilton
- Loretta Napoleoni
- Louis Garrel
- Luis de Guindos
- Luiz Inácio Lula da Silva
- Lynda Rose
- Marwan Bishara
- Madeleine Albright
- Manu Chao
- Margaret Chan
- Mark Knopfler
- Mark Malloch Brown
- Mark Regev
- Martin Lindstrom
- Martin McGuinness
- Martti Ahtisaari
- Maryam al-Khawaja
- M. Cherif Bassiouni
- Medard Mulangala
- Merhezia Labidi Maiza
- Mia Farrow
- Michael Caine
- Michelle Bachelet
- Mikhail Gorbachev
- Mikheil Saakashvili
- Mohamed A. El-Erian
- Mohamed Nasheed
- Mohsen Makhmalbaf
- Morgan Tsvangirai
- Mozah bint Nasser Al Missned
- Muhammad Tahir-ul-Qadri
- Muhammad Yunus
- Nadine Labaki
- Nawaz Sharif
- Nazenin Ansari
- Ngozi Okonjo-Iweala
- Noel Gallagher
- Omar al-Bashir
- Paul Krugman
- Paul Mason
- Penny Wong
- Pervez Musharraf
- Portia Walker
- Ribal al-Assad
- Ricardo Lagos
- Richard Dawkins
- Roberto Benigni
- Robert De Niro
- Robert Gates
- Roger Waters
- Roger Federer
- Sanusi Lamido Sanusi
- Sarah Jessica Parker
- Sebastian Coe
- Sharmeen Obaid-Chinoy
- Sheikh Hasina
- Shimon Peres
- Shukria Barakzai
- Stephen Kinzer
- Steve Redgrave
- Steven Soderbergh
- Suha Arafat
- Tarja Halonen
- Tony Blair
- Tracey Emin
- Vicky Pryce
- Vincent Nichols
- Wesley Clark
- William Hague
- William Patey
- William Shawcross
- Xenia Dormandy
- Yoko Ono
- Zbigniew Brzezinski
- Zhang Weiwei
