= Noumoudara =

Noumoudara Noumoudara
- town of Burkina Faso
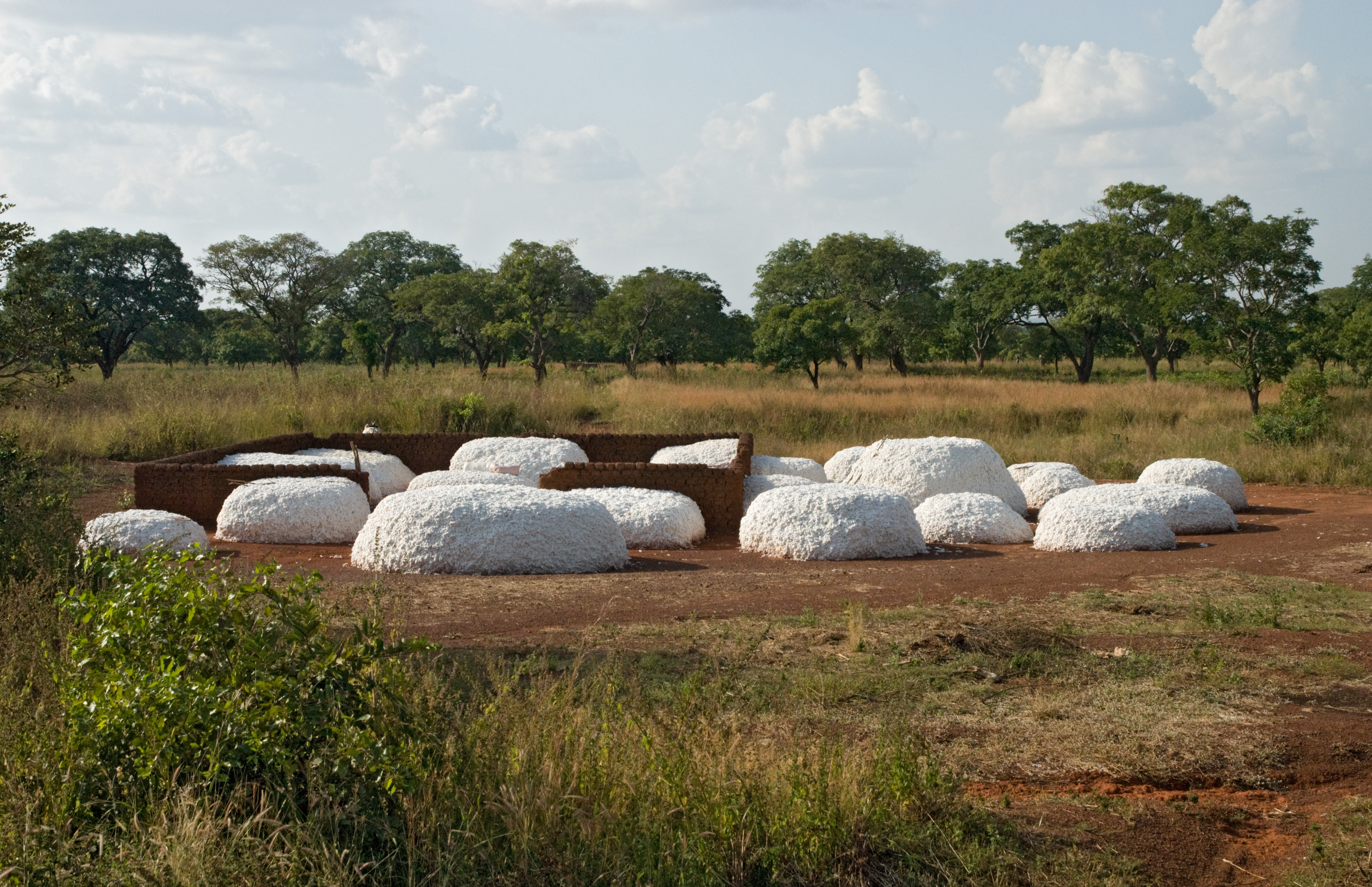
- Cotton modules in Noumoudara

- Location in Burkina Faso
- Coordinates: 10.980912°N 4.421865°W
- Country: Burkina Faso
- Region: Hauts-Bassins Region
- Province: Houet Province

Population (2006)
  - Total: 1,007

Noumoudara is a town in southwestern Burkina Faso, 26 km southwest of the city of Bobo-Dioulasso. It is located in Hauts-Bassins Region. As of 2006 it had a population of 1,007 people.

The etymology of the town comes from two places. In the Dyula language, "noumou" means "blacksmith" while "daga" means "village". Thus, the name "Noumoudara" means "the village of the blacksmiths."

Historically, the town was the main center of the Tiefo People. It became the scene of much military action in 1897. Samori Ture of the Samorian state had recently conquered and razed Kong. He then sought to attack the Dyula trading town of Bobob-Dioulasso. In order to do so, he first had to besiege the rival town of Noumoudara, which he duly did following the 19th of July. The fortress fell after a week-long siege, with Samori ordering its destruction as a show of strength.
