= Moumouni Fabré =

Burkinabé politician

Moumouni Fabré (born 28 November 1953) is a Burkinabé politician who has served as the Ambassador of Burkina Faso to South Africa since 2008. He was Minister of Territorial Administration and Decentralization from 2002 to 2006.

== Life and career ==
Fabré was Ambassador to Germany from late 1988 to March 1991, then Ambassador to Iran from 1992 to 1997. Subsequently he was an Adviser to the Presidency of Burkina Faso; he was responsible for organizing the 34th Summit of the Organisation of African Unity in June 1997, and he was Coordinator of the 26th Islamic Conference of Foreign Ministers in January 1998. Later, he was appointed as Director of the Cabinet of Prime Minister Paramanga Ernest Yonli in July 2001. Fabré was then appointed to the government as Minister of Territorial Administration and Decentralization on 10 June 2002, serving in that position until being dismissed from the government in January 2006. He was instead appointed as Ambassador and Representative of the President of Burkina Faso to Togo, responsible for monitoring the implementation of political agreements.

After serving as President Blaise Compaore's Representative in Togo, Fabré was appointed as Ambassador to South Africa on 16 April 2008. He arrived in South Africa on 9 August 2008 and presented his credentials to South African President Kgalema Motlanthe on 2 October 2008.
