= Foreign relations of Morocco =

Morocco is a member of the United Nations and belongs to the African Union, Arab League, Arab Maghreb Union (UMA), Organisation of Islamic Cooperation (OIC), the Non-Aligned Movement and the Community of Sahel-Saharan States (CEN-SAD). Morocco's relationships vary greatly between African, Arab, United States, United Kingdom, Australia, and Western states. Morocco has had strong ties with the West in order to gain economic and political benefits. France and Spain remain the primary trade partners, as well as the primary creditors and foreign investors in Morocco. From the total foreign investments in Morocco, the European Union invests approximately 73.5%, whereas the Arab world invests only 19.3%. As of 2009, many countries from the Persian Gulf and Maghreb regions are also becoming more involved in large-scale development projects in Morocco.

Foreign relations have had a significant impact on economic and social development in Morocco. Certain evidence of foreign influence is through the many development projects, loans, investments, and free trade agreements that Morocco has with other countries. Some free trade agreements include the Euro-Mediterranean free trade area agreement with the European Union; the Greater Arab Free Trade Area with Egypt, Jordan, and Tunisia; as well as the US-Morocco Free Trade Agreement with the United States. An example of recent foreign influence is through loan agreements. Morocco signed three loan agreements with the French Development Agency (AFD) in 2009, totalling up to 155 million euros. These were for the purpose of reforming the education system, rural roads and rehabilitation, as well as infrastructure projects.

== Factors influencing foreign relations ==
=== Role of political organization ===
Policies associated with foreign relations are determined by King Mohamed VI, as well as his advisors, despite the fact that Morocco has a constitutional monarchy. Morocco has had a history of monarchical rule. For example, the previous king, Hassan II of Morocco, suspended parliament in 1965 and ruled directly for two years. This was in response to the discovery of a plot on the king's life, of which a political party, UNFP, was accused of orchestrating. Foreign relations with Western countries became strained as a result of this. Portraying Morocco as a democratic state became important if Morocco wished to receive loans and investments from foreign powers.

=== Role of colonialism ===
Morocco's current relations with some countries are related to its colonial history. Morocco was secretly partitioned by Spain and France and in 1912 the Moroccan territory was made into French and Spanish protectorates. After achieving independence in 1956, Morocco still has a strong relationship with its former colonizers. Spain and France are currently the largest exporting and importing partners to Morocco. French is still popularly spoken and remains the second language in Morocco whilst Spanish is also widespread, particularly in the northern regions. France now is home to more than a million Moroccans legally residing in the country. This is the largest Moroccan population in a foreign country, followed next by Spain. These former colonizers remain influential in economic matters, such as development projects, investments, trade, and loans.

=== Role of free market ===
Relations with foreign powers, especially with the West, have also been strengthened as Morocco has liberalized its economy and implemented major economic reforms. In 1993 there was major privatization and markets were opened up to foreign powers. Morocco now is focusing more on promoting foreign direct investments. In 2007, Morocco adopted the Hassan II Fund for Development, which are measures that simplify procedures to make the process easier and more financially beneficial for foreign investors. This was done with financial incentives, as well as tax exemptions. These policies make it beneficial for other countries to have relations with Morocco so that they can take advantage of their goods. Morocco's exports are mainly agriculture, and it is one of the largest exporters of phosphate in the world. In addition, Morocco has rich fishing waters, a tourist industry, and a small manufacturing sector.

=== Role of foreign policy support ===
Morocco also gains financial support from countries that it assists. For example, Morocco has had a long history of supporting the United States and it has received financial support as a result. Moroccan troops were involved in Bosnia as well as in Somalia, during the operation Desert Storm. Morocco also was among the first Arab and Islamic states to denounce the September 11 attacks and declare solidarity with the American people in the war against terror. It has contributed to UN peacekeeping efforts on the continent. In 1998, the U.S. Secretary of Defense, William Cohen, said that Morocco and the U.S. have "mutual concerns over transnational terrorism" as well as interests in "the effort to control the spread of weapons of mass destruction". In recognition of its support for the war on terror, in June 2004 U.S. President George W. Bush designated Morocco as a major non-NATO ally. Another case of mutual foreign policy interests is with Saudi Arabia. Ties between these countries were strengthened when Morocco sent troops to help Saudi Arabia during the 1992 Gulf War. This was perceived as a "gesture to support Western and Arab allies". Morocco's relationship to countries in the Middle East and its contribution to the Palestinian cause have created stronger relations between these countries.

=== Role of immigration ===
Another factor determining relations is how much immigration the country receives from Morocco. The beginning of major migration to Europe began during the colonial era (1912 to 1956). During World War I and II, France had an urgent need for manpower, which led to the recruitment of tens of thousands of Moroccan men to work in factories, mines, and in the army. Another increase in immigration from Morocco to France was during the Algerian war of independence. France stopped recruiting workers from Algeria and instead accepted more Moroccan factory and mine labourers. Immigration increased even further from 1962 to 1972 when economic growth in Europe occurred, which led to a greater demand for low-skilled labour. At this time, Morocco signed major labour recruitment agreements with European countries, such as France, West Germany, Belgium, and the Netherlands. This led to a more diverse spread of emigration, which until this time was focused primarily on the country of France.

Morocco's perceived identity plays a role in its relations with other countries. Numerous countries have strong relations with Morocco because of its history of being a Western ally. For example, Morocco has the longest friendship treaties with the United States. This is important for US interests because Morocco is a stable, democratizing, and liberalizing MENA & Muslim nation. Geopolitical benefits are evident because ties to Morocco means that an ally is established in Africa, in the Maghreb region. Morocco's identity as a Muslim state has also strengthened ties with the Persian Gulf countries as a result of 9/11 and the "war on terror". This has resulted in Arab countries, including members of the GCC (Saudi Arabia, Bahrain, Oman, Qatar, the United Arab Emirates), choosing to invest more in Morocco. Many countries in the Maghreb region also invest in Morocco because of perceived similarities in identity.

== Maghreb and Africa ==
Morocco is very active in Maghreb and African affairs. The Arab Maghreb Union is made up of Morocco, Algeria, Libya, Mauritania, and Tunisia. Although it was long not a member of the African Union (formerly the Organisation of African Unity) since November 12, 1984—following the admission of the Sahrawi Arab Democratic Republic as the government of Western Sahara—Morocco remained involved in developing the regional economy, as the city of Casablanca contains North Africa's busiest port and serves as the country's economic center. Morocco rejoined the African Union on 30 January 2017, following a change in AU leadership. There are significant ties with West African and Sahel countries and Morocco maintains good relationships with Senegal, Gabon and Burkina Faso.

== Diplomatic relations ==
List of countries which Morocco maintains diplomatic relations with:

#	Country	Date
1	France	2 March 1956
2	Turkey	17 April 1956
3	Egypt	2 May 1956
4	Syria	2 June 1956
5	Spain	6 June 1956
6	United States	11 June 1956
7	Japan	19 June 1956
8	United Kingdom	28 June 1956
9	Tunisia	18 July 1956
10	Belgium	21 August 1956
11	Iraq	12 September 1956
12	Italy	5 November 1956
13	Switzerland	28 November 1956
14	Portugal	18 December 1956
15	Jordan	1956
16	Lebanon	1956
17	Saudi Arabia	1956
18	India	14 January 1957
19	Serbia	1 March 1957
20	Netherlands	23 March 1957
21	Germany	26 March 1957
22	Pakistan	19 August 1957
—	Iran (suspended)	5 November 1957
23	Denmark	29 November 1957
24	Luxembourg	11 April 1958
25	Sweden	23 July 1958
26	Russia	29 August 1958
27	Norway	30 August 1958
28	Libya	17 September 1958
29	China	1 November 1958
30	Greece	7 January 1959
31	Sudan	21 March 1959
32	Poland	7 July 1959
33	Czech Republic	8 July 1959
34	Finland	17 July 1959
35	Hungary	23 October 1959
36	Brazil	27 November 1959
37	Guinea	4 December 1959
38	Austria	9 December 1959
39	Liberia	5 April 1960
40	Indonesia	19 April 1960
41	Ghana	3 June 1960
42	Senegal	15 November 1960
43	Dominican Republic	15 December 1960
44	Nigeria	1960
45	Mali	10 January 1961
46	Vietnam	27 March 1961
47	Argentina	31 May 1961
48	Bulgaria	1 September 1961
49	Chile	6 October 1961
50	Albania	11 February 1962
51	Romania	20 February 1962
52	Cuba	16 April 1962
53	Canada	17 May 1962
54	South Korea	6 July 1962
55	Ivory Coast	26 August 1962
—	Algeria (suspended)	1 October 1962
56	Mexico	31 October 1962
57	Uruguay	20 December 1962
58	Ethiopia	5 August 1963
59	Niger	1 October 1963
60	Kuwait	26 October 1963
61	Sierra Leone	14 November 1963
62	Chad	16 December 1963
63	Malaysia	1963
64	Paraguay	23 May 1964
65	Peru	18 June 1964
66	Bolivia	26 June 1964
67	Venezuela	18 May 1965
68	Cameroon	13 August 1965
69	Tanzania	8 October 1965
70	Burkina Faso	21 October 1965
71	Kenya	1965
72	Uganda	1965
73	Ecuador	22 April 1966
74	Gambia	29 June 1966
75	Benin	5 November 1966
76	Democratic Republic of the Congo	27 September 1968
77	Afghanistan	5 March 1969
78	Mauritania	6 June 1970
79	Mongolia	14 July 1970
80	Guatemala	16 March 1971
81	Gabon	12 July 1972
82	United Arab Emirates	14 July 1972
83	Qatar	4 September 1972
84	Zambia	1972
85	Bahrain	5 March 1973
86	Oman	10 March 1973
87	Bangladesh	13 July 1973
88	Malta	18 December 1974
89	Nepal	18 February 1975
90	Ireland	19 March 1975
91	Philippines	10 April 1975
—	Holy See	15 January 1976
92	Mauritius	8 June 1976
93	Australia	13 July 1976
94	Central African Republic	1976
95	Djibouti	14 March 1978
96	Myanmar	13 July 1978
97	Bahamas	20 December 1978
98	Comoros	1978
99	São Tomé and Príncipe	1978
100	Colombia	1 January 1979
101	Somalia	24 January 1979
102	Panama	27 July 1979
103	Republic of the Congo	1979
104	Cyprus	1979
105	Equatorial Guinea	17 April 1980
106	Honduras	1 March 1985
107	Angola	24 June 1985
108	Haiti	20 August 1985
109	Iceland	24 September 1985
110	Thailand	4 October 1985
111	Cape Verde	1985
112	Guinea-Bissau	27 February 1986
113	Costa Rica	25 September 1986
—	Sovereign Military Order of Malta	4 December 1986
114	Maldives	4 February 1988
115	Saint Lucia	9 March 1988
116	Brunei	28 May 1988
117	Saint Vincent and the Grenadines	10 August 1988
118	Seychelles	17 December 1988
—	State of Palestine	31 January 1989
119	North Korea	13 February 1989
120	Yemen	21 February 1989
121	Namibia	23 March 1990
122	Sri Lanka	27 November 1990
123	Lesotho	1990
124	Burundi	13 September 1991
125	Lithuania	7 May 1992
126	Belarus	8 May 1992
127	Kazakhstan	26 May 1992
128	Slovenia	29 May 1992
129	Estonia	22 June 1992
130	Ukraine	22 June 1992
131	Kyrgyzstan	25 June 1992
132	Armenia	26 June 1992
133	Croatia	26 June 1992
134	Georgia	30 July 1992
135	Azerbaijan	28 August 1992
136	Turkmenistan	25 September 1992
137	Latvia	5 October 1992
138	Moldova	8 October 1992
139	Slovakia	1 January 1993
140	Bosnia and Herzegovina	24 February 1993
141	Uzbekistan	11 October 1993
142	Madagascar	15 April 1994
143	South Africa	10 May 1994
144	Eritrea	30 May 1994
145	Tajikistan	15 December 1994
146	New Zealand	1994
147	Tonga	16 January 1995
148	Eswatini	June 1996
149	Cambodia	23 October 1996
150	El Salvador	November 1996
151	Andorra	3 December 1996
152	Singapore	20 January 1997
153	Laos	30 January 1997
154	Trinidad and Tobago	4 November 1998
155	Liechtenstein	9 June 2000
156	Nicaragua	21 July 2000
157	Vanuatu	14 December 2000
158	Malawi	31 January 2001
159	Kiribati	21 March 2001
160	Belize	3 May 2001
161	North Macedonia	18 September 2002
162	Suriname	28 July 2004
163	San Marino	14 October 2004
164	Botswana	27 June 2005
165	Rwanda	21 June 2007
166	Antigua and Barbuda	3 July 2007
167	Togo	10 July 2007
168	Saint Kitts and Nevis	2 October 2007
169	Zimbabwe	27 December 2007
170	Jamaica	29 January 2008
171	Monaco	12 February 2008
172	Montenegro	8 September 2009
173	Palau	8 May 2009
174	Fiji	15 June 2010
175	Dominica	23 June 2010
176	Nauru	9 September 2010
177	Marshall Islands	13 September 2010
178	Federated States of Micronesia	13 October 2010
179	Samoa	28 January 2011
180	Solomon Islands	4 February 2011
181	Tuvalu	23 May 2011
182	Grenada	27 May 2011
183	Bhutan	21 November 2011
184	Guyana	14 December 2012
185	Barbados	17 April 2013
186	Papua New Guinea	28 September 2018
187	South Sudan	25 August 2020
188	Israel	22 December 2020
189	Mozambique	Unknown

== Bilateral relations ==
=== Africa ===
Country	Formal Relations Began	Notes
Algeria	1 October 1962	See Algeria–Morocco relations Both countries established diplomatic relations on 1 October 1962. Severed diplomatic relations 27 February 1976, restored 16 May 1988, cuts diplomatic relations 24 August 2021. As a result of Algeria's continued support for the Polisario Front in the dispute over Western Sahara, relations between Morocco and Algeria have remained strained over the past several decades. The state of the relationships between the two neighboring countries has hindered bilateral collaboration and has left the Arab Maghreb Union (UMA) project almost inactive. Morocco had been aligned with the United States during the Cold War, whereas Algeria kept a distance from the West, favouring the Soviet Union and later a non-aligned position.
Egypt		See Egypt–Morocco relations Morocco and Egypt are both signers of the Agadir Agreement for the Establishment of a Free Trade Zone between the Arabic Mediterranean Nations, signed in Rabat, Morocco on February 25, 2004. The agreement aimed at establishing a free trade area between Jordan, Tunisia, Egypt and Morocco and it was seen as a possible first step in the establishment of the Euro-Mediterranean free trade area as envisaged in the Barcelona Process. They are also founding members of GAFTA, a pact made by the Arab League to achieve a complete Arab economic bloc that can compete internationally. In 1999 Egypt renewed backing to Morocco's territorial integrity. "Egypt has always backed Morocco's efforts to perfect its territorial integrity," Egyptian deputy minister of foreign affairs, Jamal-Eddine Bayoumi told Moroccan daily Al-Mounaataf, referring to Morocco's claims to the territory. Bayoumi also stressed the need for Morocco and Egypt to consolidate trade relations among Arab states.
Mauritania	6 June 1970	See Mauritania–Morocco relations Both countries established diplomatic relations on 6 June 1970 Prior to the December 1984 coup that brought Taya to power, the Mauritanian-Moroccan cooperation agency stated that relations between the two countries were on the mend in spite of alleged Moroccan complicity in a 1981 coup attempt and Mauritania's subsequent turn toward Algeria. Representatives from both sides initiated a series of low-level contacts that led to a resumption of diplomatic ties in April 1985. For Mauritania, the détente with Morocco promised to end the threat of Moroccan incursions, and it also removed the threat of Moroccan support for opposition groups formed during the Haidalla presidency. Through the agreement with Mauritania, Morocco sought to tighten its control over the Western Sahara by denying the Polisario one more avenue for infiltrating guerrillas into the disputed territory. Relations between Morocco and Mauritania continued to improve through 1986, reflecting President Taya's pragmatic, if unstated, view that only a Moroccan victory over the Polisario would end the guerrilla war in the Western Sahara. Taya made his first visit to Morocco in October 1985 (prior to visits to Algeria and Tunisia) in the wake of Moroccan claims that Polisario guerrillas were again traversing Mauritanian territory. The completion of a sixth berm just north of Mauritania's crucial rail link along the border with the Western Sahara, between Nouadhibou and the iron ore mines, complicated relations between Mauritania and Morocco. Polisario guerrillas in mid-1987 had to traverse Mauritanian territory to enter the Western Sahara, a situation that invited Morocco's accusations of Mauritanian complicity. Moreover, any engagements near the sixth berm would threaten to spill over into Mauritania and jeopardize the rail link.
South Africa	10 May 1994	Both countries established diplomatic relations on 10 May 1994: Morocco has an embassy in Pretoria.; South Africa has an embassy in Rabat.
Sudan	21 March 1959	Both countries established diplomatic relations on 21 March 1959. Sudan is one of the states that recognize Moroccan sovereignty over Western Sahara. Both nations have a number of trade agreements. There are no visa restrictions.
Western Sahara		Recognizing Legal status of Western Sahara as an independent country Main article: Legal status of Western Sahara The conflict for this area continues to affect Morocco's relations with Spain, Algeria, and other Maghreb nations. The issue of sovereignty over Western Sahara remains unresolved. The territory—an area of wasteland and desert bordering the Atlantic Ocean between Mauritania and Morocco—is contested by Morocco and the Polisario (an independence movement based in the region of Tindouf, Algeria). Morocco's claim to sovereignty over the Sahara is based largely on an historical argument of traditional loyalty of the Sahrawi tribal leaders to the Moroccan sultan as spiritual leader and ruler. The Polisario Front claims to represent the aspirations of the Western Saharan inhabitants for independence. Algeria claims none of the territory for itself but maintains that Sahrawis should determine the territory's future status. From 1904 until 1975, Spain occupied the entire territory, which is divided into a northern portion, the Saguia el-Hamra, and a southern two-thirds, known as Río de Oro. In 1973, the Polisario Front (Popular Front for the Liberation of the Saguia el Hamra and Rio de Oro) formed to combat the Spanish occupation of the territory. In November 1975, King Hassan mobilized 350,000 unarmed Moroccan citizens in what came to be known as the "Green March" into Western Sahara. The march was designed to both demonstrate and strengthen Moroccan claims to the territory. On November 14 of the same year, Spain, Morocco, and Mauritania announced a tripartite agreement for an interim administration under which Spain agreed to share administrative authority with Morocco and Mauritania, leaving aside the question of sovereignty. With the establishment of a Moroccan and Mauritanian presence throughout the territory, however, Spain's role in the administration of the Western Sahara ceased altogether. After a period of hostilities, Mauritania withdrew from the territory in 1979 and signed a peace treaty with the Polisario relinquishing all claims to the territory. Moroccan troops took control of the region vacated by Mauritania and later proclaimed the territory reintegrated into Morocco. Morocco subsequently built the Moroccan Wall, a network of fortified berms around the largest portion of Western Sahara and has since asserted administrative control over that territory. Polisario remains in control over the easternmost part of the territory. At the Organization of African Unity (OAU) summit in June 1981, King Hassan announced his willingness to hold a referendum in the Western Sahara. Subsequent meetings of an OAU Implementation Committee proposed a cease-fire, a United Nations peacekeeping force, and an interim administration to assist with an OAU-UN-supervised referendum on the issue of independence or annexation. In 1984, the OAU seated a delegation of the Sahrawi Arab Democratic Republic (SADR), the shadow government of the Polisario; Morocco, consequently, withdrew from the OAU. In 1988, Moroccan and Polisario representatives agreed on a UN peace plan. A UN-brokered cease-fire and settlement plan went into effect on September 6, 1991. Implementation of the settlement plan, which calls for a popular referendum among the Sahrawi natives of the territory to determine its final status (integration into Morocco or independence), has been repeatedly postponed because of differences between the parties. In 2003 the UN launched the Baker Plan, allowing Moroccan settlers the vote and instituting a five-year Sahrawi autonomous rule under Moroccan sovereignty before the referendum. This plan won the unanimous approval of the Security Council through SC Resolution 1495, and was unexpectedly accepted by the Polisario. Morocco however refused the plan, stating that it is no longer willing to accept a referendum that includes the possibility of independence, but that it is willing to discuss an autonomy-based solution. This deadlocked the process, and the future of UN involvement is uncertain. Sahrawi demonstrations and riots that broke out in the Moroccan-held parts of Western Sahara further strained relations between the parties. The United States has consistently supported the cease-fire and the UN's efforts at finding a peaceful settlement. As generally supportive of the Moroccan government administrative control of Western Sahara, the United States support Morocco's autonomy proposal and recognizing Morocco's sovereignty over Western Sahara. In the UN Security Council, France has proved the strongest backer of the Moroccan view, China and UK hasn't clear statement, only support for a mutually acceptable solution under the leadership of the Security Council.

=== Americas ===
Country	Formal Relations Began	Notes
Argentina	31 May 1961	See Argentina–Morocco relations Both countries established diplomatic relations on 31 May 1961.: Argentina has an embassy in Rabat.; Morocco has an embassy in Buenos Aires.
Brazil	1962	Both countries established diplomatic relations in 1962: Brazil has an embassy in Rabat.; Morocco has an embassy in Brasília.
Canada	17 May 1962	See Canada–Morocco relations Both countries established diplomatic relations on 17 May 1962 Embassy of Morocco in Ottawa: Canada has an embassy in Rabat.; Morocco has an embassy in Ottawa and a consulate-general in Montreal.
Chile	6 October 1961	Both countries established diplomatic relations on 6 October 1961: Chile has an embassy in Rabat.; Morocco has an embassy in Santiago.
Colombia	1 January 1979	Both countries established diplomatic relations on 1 January 1979: Colombia has an embassy in Rabat.; Morocco has an embassy in Bogotá.
Cuba	21 April 2017	Historically, bilateral relations between Cuba and Morocco were strained after the establishment of relations on December 10, 1959. Morocco severed relations with Cuba on October 31, 1963, after Cuba showed its support for Algeria during the Sands War. Morocco then restored diplomatic relations with Cuba on January 13, 1964, only to cut ties once again in 1980, following Cuba's recognition of the SADR.; Cuba and Morocco re-established diplomatic relations on April 21, 2017.
Mexico	31 October 1962	Both countries established diplomatic relations on 31 October 1962 See Mexico–Morocco relations: Mexico has an embassy in Rabat and a trade office in Casablanca.; Morocco has an embassy in Mexico City.
Peru	18 June 1964	Main article: Morocco–Peru relations: Both countries established diplomatic relations on 18 June 1964; Morocco has an embassy in Lima.; Peru has an embassy in Rabat.
United States	11 June 1956	Both countries established diplomatic relations on March 8, 1905. However, upon U.S. entry into the First World War, the U.S. Government issued a statement recognizing the protectorate over Morocco on October 20, 1917, whereupon the U.S. Minister at Tangier was downgraded to the status of Diplomatic Agent. Diplomatic relations reestablished on June 11, 1956. See Morocco–United States relations The last page of 1786 treaty of friendship. Morocco has close and long standing ties with the United States. Morocco was the first nation to recognize the fledgling United States as an independent nation. In the beginning of the American Revolution, American merchant ships were subject to attack by the Barbary Pirates while sailing the Atlantic Ocean. At this time, American envoys tried to obtain protection from European powers, but to no avail. On December 20, 1777, Morocco's Sultan Mohammed III declared that the American merchant ships would be under the protection of the sultanate and could thus enjoy safe passage. The Moroccan-American Treaty of Friendship stands as the U.S.'s oldest non-broken friendship treaty. Negotiated by Thomas Barclay and signed by John Adams and Thomas Jefferson in 1786, it has been in continuous effect since its ratification by Congress in July 1787. Following the re-organization of the U.S. federal government upon the 1787 Constitution, President George Washington wrote a now venerated letter to the Sultan Sidi Mohamed strengthening the ties between the two countries. The United States legation (consulate) in Tangier is the first property the American government ever owned abroad, and is the first (and only) National Historic Landmark on purely foreign soil. The building now houses the Tangier American Legation Museum.: See also Moroccan Americans

=== Asia ===
Morocco's stance is supporting the search for peace in the Middle East, encouraging Israeli–Palestinian negotiations and urging moderation on both sides.

Morocco maintains close relations with Saudi Arabia and the Persian Gulf states, which have provided Morocco with substantial amounts of financial assistance. Morocco was the first Arab state to condemn Iraq's invasion of Kuwait and sent troops to help defend Saudi Arabia. Morocco also was among the first Arab and Islamic states to denounce the September 11 attacks in the United States and declare solidarity with the American people in the war against terrorism. It has contributed to United Nations peacekeeping efforts on the continent. In recognition of its support for the war on terrorism, in June 2004 U.S. President George W. Bush designated Morocco as a major non-NATO ally.

Country	Formal Relations Began	Notes
Azerbaijan	28 August 1992	Both countries established diplomatic relations on 28 August 1992 See Azerbaijan-Morocco relations: Azerbaijan has an embassy in Rabat since 2005.; Morocco has an embassy in Baku.
China	1 November 1958	See China–Morocco relations Both countries established diplomatic relations on 1 November 1958
Indonesia	19 April 1960	See Indonesia-Morocco relations: Indonesia and Morocco shared similarity as Muslim-majority countries.; Morocco praised Indonesia as a strong democratic nation, and pointed that both countries facing the same challenges of separatism and terrorism.; Diplomatic relations were established in 1960. Indonesia has an embassy in Rabat and a consulate in Casablanca, while Morocco has an embassy in Jakarta.; both countries are members of the WTO, NAM and OIC.
Iran		See Iran–Morocco relations: Relations between Iran and Morocco have been relatively strained since the Iranian Revolution, particularly regarding the "hard-line" leadership in Iran. Morocco first severed relations in 1980, following the Revolution, however it later re-established diplomatic relations in June 1992.; On March 6, 2009, Morocco again severed diplomatic relations with Iran after comments made by an Iranian politician that Bahrain was historically part of Iran and as such still had a seat in the Iranian Parliament. Morocco described the comments as an attempt to "alter the religious fundamentals of the kingdom", and accused Tehran of attempting to spread Shia Islam. Morocco is a majority Sunni country and Bahrain, despite having a large Shi'ite population, is ruled by a Sunni elite which has not allowed the Shi'ites into the power structure. Iran, a majority Shia country, reportedly has an interest in empowering the Shi'ites in Bahrain, and has called into question the legitimacy of Bahrain's King, in order to raise its own status in the Persian Gulf, which has strained relations between Morocco and Iran.; Morocco cut diplomatic ties with Iran a third time in May 2018, over what Moroccan foreign minister Nasser Bourita said was Iranian support and arming of the Polisario Front. Relations were previously restored around 2014, although they have been gradually weak.
Israel	10 December 2020	See Israel–Morocco relations: In 1986, then King Hassan II took the daring step of inviting then-Israeli Prime Minister Shimon Peres for talks, becoming only the second MENA leader to host an Israeli leader. Following the September 1993 signing of the Israeli-Palestinian Declaration of Principles, Morocco accelerated its economic ties and political contacts with Israel. In September 1994, Morocco and Israel announced the opening of bilateral liaison offices. These offices were closed in 2000 following sustained Israeli–Palestinian violence.; On 10 December 2020, Morocco agreed to establish diplomatic relations with Israel in exchange for the United States supporting Morocco's claim on Western Sahara. On the same day, the United States agreed to the sale of sophisticated drones to Morocco. As a result of the agreement, the Israeli liaison office was reopened in Rabat, with plans for an embassy underway.
Kuwait	26 October 1963	Both countries established diplomatic relations on 26 October 1963 when Mr. Al-Fatimi ibn Sulaiman presented his credentials as Ambassador of Morocco to Amir of Kuwait, Sheikh Abdullah Al-Salem Al-Sabah.
Malaysia	1963	See Malaysia–Morocco relations Both countries established diplomatic relations in 1963. Malaysia has an embassy in Rabat, and Morocco has an embassy in Kuala Lumpur.
Pakistan	19 August 1957	See Morocco–Pakistan relations Both countries established diplomatic relations on 19 August 1957 Pakistan has an embassy in Rabat while Morocco also has its embassy in Islamabad. Both the countries have co-operated significantly since the past and continue to widely expand their relations, in the past Pakistan has said that it does not recognise Western Sahara and that its status is disputed and remains to be decided by United Nations resolutions, but at the same time it gave the Moroccan point of view that it is an internal matter. Pakistan and Morocco enjoy friendly relationship based on deep religious and great human values commonly shared by both countries. These relations have grown to a large extent in recent years and thousands of Pakistanis visit Morocco annually.
Palestine	31 January 1989	See Morocco–Palestine relations and Foreign relations of the State of Palestine Both countries established diplomatic relations on 31 January 1989: Morocco has an embassy in Gaza.; Palestine has an embassy in Rabat.
Philippines	27 December 1975	See Morocco-Philippines relations Both countries established diplomatic relations on 27 December 1975: Morocco has an embassy in Manila.; The Philippines has an embassy in Rabat.
South Korea	6 July 1962	Both countries established diplomatic relations on 6 July 1962: Morocco has an embassy in Seoul; South Korea has an embassy in Rabat.
Thailand	4 October 1985	Both countries established diplomatic relations on 4 October 1985: Morocco has an embassy in Bangkok.; Thailand has an embassy in Rabat.
Turkey	17 April 1956	See Morocco–Turkey relations Both countries established diplomatic relations on 17 April 1956: Morocco has an embassy in Ankara and a consulate-general in Istanbul.; Turkey has an embassy in Rabat.; Trade volume between the two countries was US$2.71 billion in 2018 (Moroccan exports/imports: 0.72/1.99 billion USD).; 114,155 Moroccan tourists visited Turkey in 2017.; Yunus Emre Institute has a local headquarters in Rabat.
United Arab Emirates		Morocco has an embassy in Abu Dhabi and consulate-general in Dubai.; the United Arab Emirates has an embassy in Rabat.
Vietnam	27 March 1961	Both countries established diplomatic relations on 27 March 1961: Morocco has an embassy in Hanoi.; Vietnam has an embassy in Rabat.

=== Europe ===
Country	Formal Relations Began	Notes
Albania	11 February 1962	Both countries established diplomatic relations on 11 February 1962: Morocco is accredited to Albania at the Moroccan embassy in Italy.; Albania is accredited to Morocco at the Albanian embassy in Spain.
Austria		Austria has an embassy in Rabat.; Morocco has an embassy in Vienna.
Belgium	30 July 1956	Both countries established diplomatic relations on 30 July 1956 when has been established Embassy of Belgium in Rabat and appointed Mr. P. Lamotte as Ambassador of Belgium to Morocco.: Around 530000 Moroccans reside in Belgium.
Bosnia and Herzegovina	24 February 1993	Both countries established diplomatic relations on 24 February 1993: Morocco is accredited to Bosnia at the Moroccan embassy in Croatia.; Bosnia is accredited to Morocco at the Bosnian embassy in Spain.
Bulgaria	1 September 1961	Both countries established diplomatic relations on 1 September 1961: Since January 1962, Bulgaria has an embassy in Rabat and an honorary consulate in Casablanca.; Morocco has an embassy in Sofia.; Both countries are full members of the Union for the Mediterranean.
Croatia	26 June 1992	Both countries established diplomatic relations on 26 June 1992: Croatia has an embassy in Rabat.; Morocco has an embassy in Zagreb.; Both countries are full members of the Union for the Mediterranean.; Croatian Ministry of Foreign Affairs and European Integration: list of bilateral treaties with Morocco
Denmark	1957	Both countries established diplomatic relations in 1957: Denmark has an embassy in Rabat, Morocco.; Morocco has an embassy in Copenhagen, Denmark
European Union		See Morocco–European Union relations Morocco maintains close relations with the European Union, especially with its former colonial rulers, France and Spain. In October 2008, Morocco was granted a special partnership status with the EU (labelled as an 'advanced status') in response to the reforms undertaken on political, social and economic levels. With that, Morocco became the first country in the southern Mediterranean region to benefit from the advanced status in its relations with the EU. The status includes the establishment of an EU-Morocco summit and a direct participation of Morocco in a number of EU ministerial councils and working group meetings. Morocco has been afforded the privilege of having its currency unit linked to the Euro.
Finland	17 July 1959	Both countries established diplomatic relations on 17 July 1959.: Finland has an embassy in Rabat.; Morocco has an embassy in Helsinki.
France	2 March 1956	See France–Morocco relations Both countries established diplomatic relations on 2 March 1956 France showed early interests in Morocco and in 1904; the United Kingdom recognized France's sphere of influence in the region. France and Spain secretly partitioned Morocco, despite the evident disagreements this caused with Germany. The Treaty of Fes in 1912 made Morocco a protectorate of France. Struggles and opposition ensued when France exiled the Sultan Mohammed V, replacing him with Mohammed Ben Aarafa. The development of a strong independence movement together with a common trend of decolonization led to Morocco being granted independence in 1956. When De Gaulle returned to power in 1958, he was able to consolidate most of the initiatives taken under the Fourth Republic, but was only able to make progress by drawing up, once again, a new Constitution and finding a solution to the war in Algeria. It was only after his return that the policy of decolonisation ended and a policy of a new France started to emerge. 1962 marked Algerian independence and the revision of the Fifth Republic allowed the President of France to be directly elected. De Gaulle was able to set out his vision for the Third World, Africa and French influence in the wider world. Relations with Morocco were very cordial during the reign of King Mohammed V, only to take a turn for the worse when the French secret service delivered Ben Barka to some Moroccan agents, who eventually killed him and the affair turned into a serious and personal diplomatic row between King Hassan II and General de Gaulle, which lasted until the exit of the latter from politics in 1969. During Pompidou's presidency a new entente developed between Morocco and France when new initiatives emerged in the field of co-operation setting up new institutions to deal with future aid and Moroccan economic development. Giscard d'Estaing's presidency provided a more pronounced support for Morocco and relations reached their zenith leading to a type of partnership in the affairs of Africa. The French-Moroccan intervention in Zaire was evidence of this partnership and President Giscard d'Estaing was in favour of Morocco's annexation of the Western Sahara. French military and public aid allocated to Morocco was unparalleled during this period when compared to previous aid received. Mitterrand's presidency did not affect the special relations between Morocco and France but intensified after a shaky beginning. Although human rights proved difficult to resolve, nevertheless, the President kept the issue going together with Danielle Mitterrand, as President of France-Liberté. Towards the end of his first term in office, a more challenging period for constitutional debate emerged as a result of cohabitation which occurred between 1986 and 1988, adding another dimension to alternance to the end of Mitterrand's second septennat to the arrival of Jacques Chirac. By now a more stable and continuous policy emerged to encourage investment and cooperation on major projects not only in agriculture and dam projects but also involving both French and Moroccan enterprises in creating a solid and a durable industrial base from aeronautics to automobile industries, to the Euro-Med Port at Tangier and Renault-Nissan Plant and TGV and tram projects in Casablanca and Rabat concluded under the presidency of Sarkozy. Both France and the USA played an important role in supplying the Moroccan military with all the hardware and equipment needed to redress the balance of power within the region, especially against Algeria's rearmament, to ensure security in the Western Sahara and keep the Al Qaeda branch of the Maghreb outside the Moroccan borders. The Moroccan military has been modernised and trained to be admitted within the USA-NATO forces to carry out regular exercises, as well as involving other NATO members in the fight against any terrorist threat in the Mediterranean, the Atlantic and the Sahara regions. Franco-Moroccan co-operation also extends to the African continent and both played a complementary role in helping to resolve the problems in the Congo, in Chad and in many other fields as well as in the economy and politics of the region. Morocco has become the preferred destination for African students to attend university, instead of going to France, or to attend military academies, Management and Administration or medical schools. Moroccan banking has a significant hold on some African countries as well as Moroccan expertise in energy production, construction, mining extraction, diamond and gold exploitation as well as a great expertise in agriculture and infrastructure in general. In short, many sectors which used to be the domain of France have been gradually taken over by Moroccan companies and Moroccan know-how.
Germany	26 March 1957	See Germany–Morocco relations Both countries established diplomatic relations on 26 March 1957: Morocco has an embassy in Berlin and five consulates.; Germany has an embassy in Rabat and three consulates. https://rabat.diplo.de/ma-dehttps://rabat.diplo.de/ma-de
Greece	1960	Both countries established diplomatic relations in 1960.: Greece has an embassy in Rabat.; Morocco has an embassy in Athens.
Ireland	19 March 1975	Both countries established diplomatic relations on 19 March 1975: Ireland has an embassy in Rabat, Morocco; Morocco has an embassy in Dublin, Ireland
Italy	1 October 1956	See Italy–Morocco relations Both countries established diplomatic relations on 1 October 1956: Italy has an embassy in Rabat.; Morocco has an embassy in Rome and consulate-generals in Bologna, Milan, Naples, Palermo, Turin and Verona.
Netherlands		See Morocco–Netherlands relations: Morocco has an embassy in The Hague and consulates-general in Amsterdam, 's-Hertogenbosch, Rotterdam, and Utrecht.; the Netherlands has an embassy in Rabat.
Norway	30 August 1958	Both countries established diplomatic relations on 30 August 1958
Poland	7 July 1959	See Morocco–Poland relations Both countries established diplomatic relations on 7 July 1959: Morocco has an embassy in Warsaw and an honorary consulate in Poznań.; Poland has an embassy in Rabat and an honorary consulate in Marrakesh.
Portugal	16 May 1956	See Morocco–Portugal relations Both countries established diplomatic relations on 16 May 1956.: Morocco has an embassy in Lisbon.; Portugal has an embassy in Rabat.
Romania	20 February 1962	See Morocco–Romania relations Both countries established diplomatic relations on 20 February 1962: Morocco has an embassy in Bucharest.; Romania has an embassy in Rabat and an honorary consulate in Casablanca.; Both countries are full members of the Union for the Mediterranean and of the Francophonie.
Russia	1 September 1958	See Morocco–Russia relations Moroccan Prime Minister Fatima Ezzahra El Mansouri with Russian President Vladimir Putin at the Third Russia–Africa Summit in Moscow, October 2026 Both countries established diplomatic relations on 1 September 1958 Russia has an embassy in Rabat, and a consular office in Casablanca. Morocco is represented in Russia by its embassy to Moscow. President Vladimir Putin had paid a visit to Morocco in September 2006 in order to boost economic and military ties between Russia and Morocco.
Serbia	1 March 1957	Both countries established diplomatic relations on 1 March 1957: Morocco has an embassy in Belgrade.; Serbia has an embassy in Rabat.; Serbian Ministry of Foreign Affairs about the bilateral relations with Morocco
Spain	26 May 1956	See Morocco–Spain relations Both countries established diplomatic relations on 26 May 1956 The Treaty of Fes also allocated the northern part of Morocco as a Spanish protectorate. There were many instances of resistance to protest against Spanish exploitation of Morocco. The independence of this region was gained at the same time that France withdrew control. Unlike France, Spain still maintains control on some regions, such as Ceuta and Melila in northern Morocco. Tensions also increased with conflicts over the fishing water surrounding Morocco, the island of Perejil, and the Western Sahara. Spain controls five "places of sovereignty" (Plazas de soberanía) on and off the north Africa coast: Ceuta and Melilla, as well as the islets of Peñón de Alhucemas, Peñón de Vélez de la Gomera, and Islas Chafarinas, all contested by Morocco (see Perejil Island crisis for the related incident).
Sweden	1958	Both countries established diplomatic relations in 1958: Morocco has an embassy in Stockholm.; Sweden has an embassy in Rabat.
Ukraine	22 June 1992	Both countries established diplomatic relations on 22 June 1992
United Kingdom	28 June 1956	See Morocco–United Kingdom relations Foreign Secretary William Hague with Moroccan Prime Minister Abdelilah Benkirane in London, October 2013. Morocco established diplomatic relations with the United Kingdom on 28 June 1956.: Morocco maintains an embassy in London.; The United Kingdom is accredited to Morocco through its embassy in Rabat.; Both countries share common membership of the Atlantic Co-operation Pact, the United Nations, and the World Trade Organization. Bilaterally the two countries have an Association Agreement, and an Investment Agreement.

=== Oceania ===
	Formal Relations Began	Notes
Australia	13 July 1976	Both countries established diplomatic relations on 13 July 1976 See Australia-Morocco relations
Fiji	15 June 2010	Both countries established diplomatic relations on 15 June 2010
New Zealand	1994	Both countries established diplomatic relations in 1994
Papua New Guinea	28 September 2018	Both countries established diplomatic relations on 28 September 2018

== See also ==
- List of diplomatic missions in Morocco
- Ministry of Foreign Affairs, African Cooperation and Moroccan Expatriates

== General and cited references ==
- Morocco Foreign Policy and Government Guide. Vol. 1: Strategic Information and Developments (Updated repr. ed.). Washington, D.C.: International Business Publications, USA. 2011. ISBN 978-0-7397-6000-0. Archived from the original on 20 November 2023.
- Willis, Michael; Nizar Messari (Winter 2003). "Analyzing Moroccan Foreign Policy and Relations with Europe". The Review of International Affairs. 3 (2): 152–172. doi:10.1080/1475355032000240658.
