= Muhammad Safdar =

Pakistani general (born 1934)

32nd Governor of Punjab
- In office 21 October 1999 – 29 October 2001
- President: General Pervez Musharraf
- Preceded by: Zulfiqar Ali Khosa
- Succeeded by: Khalid Maqbool

Pakistani Ambassador to Morocco

Personal details
- Born: 1 February 1934 (age 92)
- Party: Independent (politician)
- Education: Military College Jhelum
- Profession: Lt. Gen.
- Chief Minister of Punjab: Chaudhry Pervaiz Elahi

Military service
- Allegiance: Pakistan
- Branch/service: Pakistan Army
- Years of service: 1954–1989
- Rank: Lt. Gen.
- Unit: Punjab Regiment
- Commands: Command and Staff College; 7th Infantry Division; National Defence University; Chief of General Staff
- Battles/wars: Indo-Pakistani War of 1965; Indo-Pakistani War of 1971
- Post-Retirement Work: Pakistani Ambassador to Morocco; Vice Chancellor of Punjab University

Muhammad Safdar (Punjabi and Urdu: محمد صفدر) (born 1 February 1934) was the former Governor of Punjab, the largest province of Pakistan, having served from 1999 to 2001. He had previously also served as the Pakistani Ambassador to Morocco and the Vice Chancellor of Punjab University during 1993.

== Army career ==
Muhammad Safdar belongs to Dulmial, Chakwal, Pakistan and is a graduate of Military College Jhelum. Later he joined Pakistan Army. During his military career, Safdar commanded an infantry brigade and the 7th Infantry Division, Peshawar, served as commandant of the Command and Staff College, Quetta from 1982 to 1985 and then reached his professional peak as Chief of General Staff (CGS) in the GHQ having served there from 1986 to 1988. His last military appointment was commandant of the National Defence College from 1988 to 1989. Safdar retired from active service in July 1989.

== Political career ==
Safdar was the Pakistani ambassador to Morocco, vice-chancellor of the Punjab University and then Governor of Punjab. The general stayed as the Governor of Punjab till 29 October 2001, when he was replaced by Lahore Corps Commander Lt. Gen. Khalid Maqbool.

== Views ==
Brigadier (r) Shaukat Qadir, a political and defence analyst, had this to say about command attributes of Safdar, "In the course of my career I came across very few inspiring senior officers; most noteworthy among them was General Safdar, who later became VC Punjab University and, very briefly, Governor Punjab, and whose extraordinary dynamism in peace inspired one to believe that he would be a success in war."

Brigadier (r) Raja Azizur Rehman, a close friend and colleague of the governor, said this about the new governor when he was appointed in 1999, "he is consistent, professionally very sound, cool and calm. Has immense capacity for work and excels in shifting the essentials. He is soft-spoken and likes to listen, He carries a very happy team. He is very clear about his objectives and leaves no stone unturned to achieve that." The general is reputed to be well versed in the art of getting things done.

Military offices
Preceded by Mirza Aslam Beg	Chief of General Staff; 1986–1988	Succeeded by Mian Muhammad Afzaal
Political offices
Preceded by Zulfiqar Ali Khosa	Governor of Punjab; 1999–2001	Succeeded by Khalid Maqbool
