= Morocco–European Union relations =

- European Union: Morocco

Morocco is a neighbouring and associated country of the European Union. The nation has a territorial land border with EU member Spain in the exclaves of Ceuta and Melilla. It also has a maritime border with Spain through the Gibraltar Strait and Exclusive Economic Zone borders with EU member Portugal in the Atlantic. The relations between the two are framed in the European Neighbourhood Policy (ENP) and the Union for the Mediterranean. Among the ENP countries, Morocco has been recognised an advanced status, opening up to high levels of political cooperation.

The main legal ties between Morocco and the EU are set by the 2000 Association Agreement. Several other agreements cover sectoral issues, including the 2006 EU-Morocco Fisheries Partnership Agreement and the 2006 Open Skies agreement.

== Legal ties between Morocco and the European Union ==
Diplomatic relations between Morocco and the European Union date back to 1960, when a commercial agreement was concluded with the European Communities. In 1976 a first co-operation agreement was signed.

At the 1995 Barcelona conference the Euro-Mediterranean Partnership was inaugurated, establishing a policy with ambitious and long-term objectives in the fields of the political and security partnership, the economic and financial partnership and cooperation in social, cultural and human affairs.

The beginning of King Mohammed VI's reign in July 1999 marked a major shift towards more cooperation, comprehension and partnership. In order to improve the Euro-Mediterranean Cooperation, the EU and Morocco set up the EU–Morocco Association Agreement. This document, dated 1 March 2000, is the legal basis for relations between Morocco and the EU.

With the inauguration of the European Neighbourhood Policy and of the Union for the Mediterranean, Morocco and the EU have drafted and adopted an ENP Action Plan in July 2005, delineating the next steps of cooperation. Under the Neighbourhood Action Plan Morocco has embarked on a major effort to align itself on the legislation and standards of the EU. This should enable it to gradually advance the possibilities offered by the Neighbourhood Policy, and in particular progress beyond the existing relations towards a significant degree of integration; this includes allowing Morocco to participate in the single market and taking part gradually in EU programmes. This will require a great effort by Morocco to create the necessary legislative and institutional conditions. This ambition is reflected in Morocco's advanced status with the EU which is "more than association, less than accession".

With the Advanced Status granted to Morocco on 13 October 2008, the partnership acquired a high-level political cooperation level. The first EU-Morocco summit took place on 7 March 2010.

=== Bilateral agreements ===
Fisheries agreements (the latest being the 2006 EU–Morocco Fisheries Partnership Agreement, FPA) have been periodically signed between Morocco and the EU since the 1980s, allowing European vessels (especially Spanish and Portuguese) to fish in Moroccan waters in exchange for a monetary contribution.

Since 2000 Morocco and the EU have signed many bilateral agreements. Various agreements of free trade that Morocco ratified with its principal economic partners like the Euro-Mediterranean free trade area agreement. The two sides recently announced plans to extend their Free Trade Agreement to cover not only goods, but also agriculture and services, giving Morocco almost the same deal with Europe as member states have with each other. Those agreements are parts of the Euro-Mediterranean free trade area signed in Barcelona, Spain in 1995.

Morocco and the EU have also signed an open skies agreement. The agreement is Europe's first ever outside its borders. It came into force in summer 2006.

In 2017, Federica Mogherini, the EU's High Representative for Foreign Affairs and Security Policy, stirred controversy and diplomatic confusion over her statement that the trade agreements between Morocco and the EU would not be affected by the 2016 ruling by the European Court of Justice on the scope of trade with Morocco. This ruling confirmed that bilateral trade deals, such as the EU–Morocco Fisheries Partnership Agreement, covers only agricultural produce and fishing products originating within the internationally recognised borders of Morocco, thus explicitly excluding any product sourced from Western Sahara or its territorial waters. The international community, including the EU, almost unanimously rejects Morocco's territorial claim to Western Sahara.

In 2024, the Court of Justice of the European Union issued a ruling that annulled EU-Morocco trade agreements on fisheries and agricultural products because they included Western Sahara.

=== Membership application ===
Countries that could join the European Union Current members Candidate countries Applicant / potential candidate countries Membership possible Membership not possible

In 1987, Morocco applied to join the European Communities (the precursor to the European Union). The application was rejected on the grounds that Morocco was not considered to be a "European country" and hence could not join. This geographic membership criterion has been part of the EU's and its predecessors' treaties since the Treaty of Rome (Article 237 of the Treaty establishing the European Economic Community) and was later also included among the Copenhagen criteria. The rejection was expected as King Hassan II had sent feelers two years prior and received such a response.

=== Human rights ===
On 19 January 2023, the European Parliament condemned Morocco for the first time in 25 years, as it called on the country to respect media freedom and to release all political prisoners and jailed journalists, notably the case of Omar Radi. On 23 January, the Moroccan Parliament voted to review ties with the European Parliament calling it "an unacceptable attack against the sovereignty, dignity and independence of judicial institutions in the kingdom."

== Economic cooperation ==
Morocco tops the list of partners that benefited from the European Union's financial support as part of neighbourhood assistance, receiving about €205 million in 2009 (€654 million for 2007–2010). In order to help the country in this new statutory phase in bilateral relations, the EU will increase aid for the period 2011–2013.

In December 2009, the EU granted Morocco a donation of MAD 771 million (US$100 million) to promote investments and exports, and contribute to the financing of the Rabat-Salé tramway project.

=== Financial protocols (1977–1996) ===
Under the four financial protocols of the 1976 Cooperation Agreement signed between the European Community (predecessor of the EU) and Morocco, Morocco received a total of €1091 million, including €574 million from the Community budget and of €518 million in the form of loans from EIB's own resources. The protocols gave sectoral priority to rural development (46%). Other sectors of activity were, in order of importance: economic infrastructure (17%), the social sector (15.6%), the private sector (10%), vocational training (10%) and civil society (0.4%).

=== MEDA programme ===
The Meda programme (adopted in July 1996) is the EU's principal financial instrument for the implementation of the Euro-Mediterranean Partnership. The budgetary resources allocated under Meda were €3.4 billion for 1995–1999 and €5.4 billion for 2000–2006. Morocco has become the principal beneficiary of the Meda programme, with commitments totalling €1.472 million for 1995–2006, of which €660 million under Meda I (1995–1999) and €812 million under Meda II (2000–2006).

Meda cooperation touched all socio-economic spheres in Morocco. Several structural adjustment programmes were set up in essential sectors such as finance, taxation, water, transport, health, education, the civil service, plus twinnings and exchanges in services such as customs, the environment, youth, transport and justice. Investment programmes were implemented to support enterprise development, vocational training in the tourism, textile, and information and communication technology sectors, the development of the national road transport such as the Mediterranean "rocade" and the rural network, integrated rural infrastructure development, and water and sanitation programmes in rural areas (PAGER), measures to deal with unhealthy habitats to get rid of slums and improve access to social facilities. Meda funds were also channelled to migration, with the aim of fostering a better management of migratory flows. Financial cooperation also concerned environmental protection and the promotion of human rights and fundamental freedoms.

In the period 1996–2006 Morocco received financing totalling approximately €15 million under horizontal EU budget lines, in particular Meda democracy, the environment, LIFE, the ECIP, the fight against AIDS, NGO cofinancing, and the fight against drugs, plus €10 million under the budget lines for the 5th and 6th Framework Research, Technology and Development Programmes, in which more than 160 Moroccan teams participated.

== Political cooperation ==
In 2006 the EU commissioner for external relations, Benita Ferrero-Waldner, declared that "we [EU] already have a very, very close relationship with Morocco, and we're studying giving them even more advanced status".

In 2008, Morocco was the first country in the region to be granted advanced status, which makes it a pioneer in the European Neighbourhood Policy. The agreement constitutes a "roadmap" which widens the sphere of EU-Morocco bilateral relations by setting out new objectives in three main areas: closer political relations, with the holding of a periodic EU-Morocco summit and the establishment of consultation mechanisms at ministerial level; integration of the single market on the basis of gradual adoption of the Community acquis and sectoral cooperation; and a focus on the human dimension.

The first EU–Morocco summit was held March 7, 2010. It was the first of its kind between the EU and an Arab or African country. Abbas El Fassi, Van Rompuy and Barroso presented to the press the results of the summit, commending the event which heralds a new era in the privileged and strategic partnership. The Granada summit between the European Union and Morocco concluded with a positive assessment of the development of their relations and with the commitment to build on their political, economic and social aspect, as well as to begin a process of reflection on their future 'contractual' form. On bilateral partnership, the joint declaration sets concrete measures to consolidate achievements and an operational agenda for the future, as part of the advanced status which specifies the relation between Morocco and the EU. The summit also addressed the state of EU–Morocco relations and future developments, as well as other subjects of common interest such as the legal status of Western Sahara, the situation in the Maghreb and the Sahel, and the Union for the Mediterranean.

European Commissioner for Enlargement and European Neighbourhood Policy Štefan Füle visited Morocco in January 2012. He said he was very pleased with the reform developments and the country is going in the right direction, but some improvements still need to be made and the Nation are currently working on it.

=== Issues ===
Illegal immigration and terrorism have already replaced issues on the agenda that were important before, such as trade (i.e. agriculture and fishing) and drug trafficking. Starting in 2000, Moroccan and EU authorities have been keen to work together more closer with intelligence sharing and border control cooperation.

Human rights was an issue that curved Morocco–EU relationships for decades. Now, many European officials have lauded the efforts Morocco has made in the human rights field.

Another hot issue concerns territorial disputes. In July 2002, there was a skirmish between Spain and Morocco during the Perejil incident. Though tensions have eased since the coming of the Spanish Socialist party to power, the two Spanish exclaves of Ceuta and Melilla are still an obstacle between the two neighbouring countries. In October 2006 a diplomatic controversy was sparked between Morocco and Spain when Morocco had denied entry from Ceuta of a Spanish aid package consisting of 150 patrol vehicles to fight illegal immigration. This was later resolved by delivering the goods 50 km off Tangier's coast.

The Western Sahara conflict has always been on the agenda. Morocco has long been seeking a formal European recognition of its claimed rights over the disputed territory.

On 17 May 2021, an incident occurred between Morocco and Spain, in which massive crossing of people took place along the beaches of the border between both countries in the direction of Ceuta and Melilla in Spain. It originated due to a deterioration in diplomatic relations between the Government of Morocco and the Government of Spain, after the latter admitted the transfer of the main representative of the Saharawi independence movement Polisario Front to a Spanish hospital in La Rioja, in April 2021. On 24 June 2022, an incident occurred which involved deaths of 23 migrants after an illegal migration attempt towards Melilla.

== Morocco's foreign relations with EU member states ==
- Austria
- Belgium
- Bulgaria
- Croatia
- Cyprus
- Czech Republic
- Denmark
- Estonia
- Finland
- France
- Germany
- Greece
- Hungary
- (Republic of Ireland) Ireland
- Italy
- Latvia
- Lithuania
- Luxembourg
- Malta
- Netherlands
- Poland
- Portugal
- Romania
- Slovakia
- Slovenia
- Spain
- Sweden

== See also ==
- Economy of Morocco
- Enlargement of the European Union
- Foreign relations of the European Union
- Foreign relations of Morocco
- Human rights in Morocco
- Union for the Mediterranean
- Morocco in the Eurovision Song Contest
- United States-Morocco Free Trade Agreement
