= Morocco–Philippines relations =

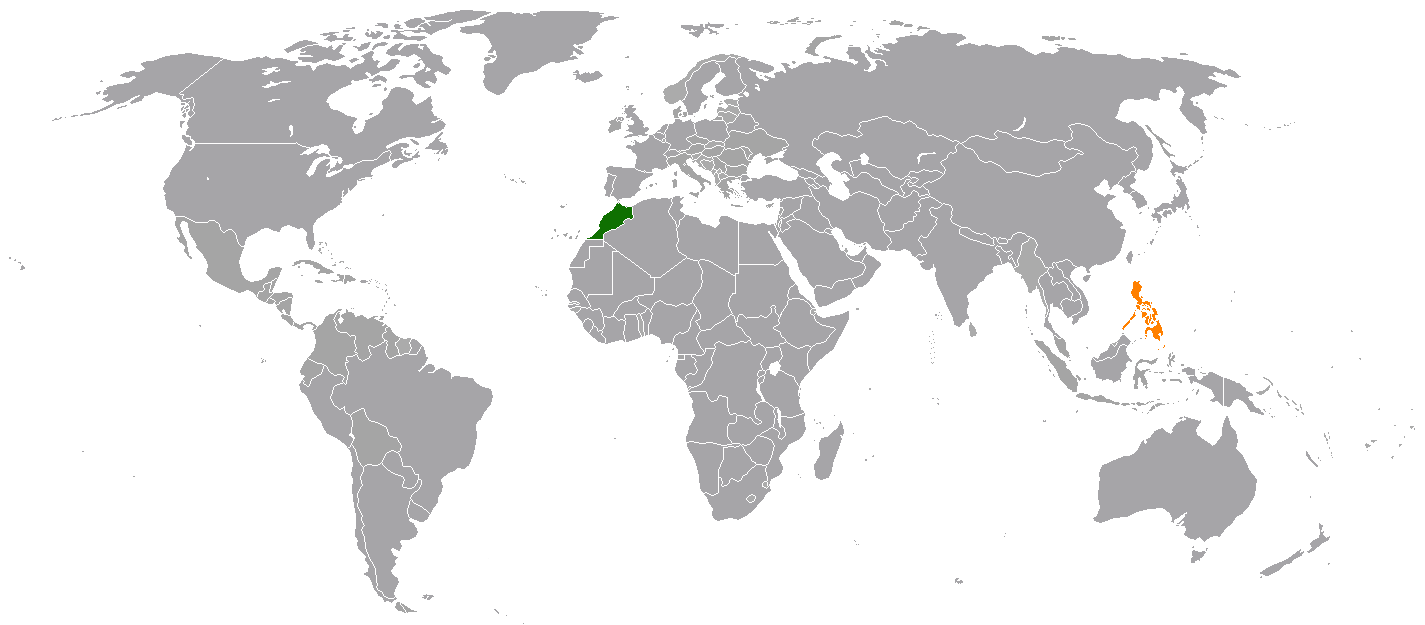

- Morocco: Philippines

Morocco–Philippines relations refers to the bilateral relations between Morocco and the Philippines. Relations between the two countries were officially established on December 27, 1975. Morocco has an embassy in Manila and the Philippines has an embassy in Rabat.

== Diplomatic mission ==
The Philippines previously had an embassy to Morocco in Rabat. The embassy was closed in March 1986, about month just after President Corazon Aquino took office following the aftermath of People Power Revolution. The daughter of the ousted President, Ferdinand Marcos, Imee Marcos and her husband Tommy Manotoc resided in Morocco and reportedly had Moroccan passports following the overthrow of Marcos. The Marcoses were close friends with King Hassan II.

The closure of the diplomatic mission was criticized by then Philippine Senator Leticia Ramos-Shahani, and claimed that the Philippines' image in the Muslim World was damaged with the embassy closure, a move Shahani viewed as ignoring King Hassan II, the 37th descendant of Muhammad and founder of the Organisation of Islamic Cooperation.

Morocco has a resident ambassador in the Philippines, Mohammed Rida El-Fassi, who presented his credentials to President Rodrigo Duterte on January 10, 2017. However, the embassy opened nearly 2 years afterwards, in November 2018. It is located in Taguig, a city in Metro Manila.

In December 2019, the Philippines re-opened its embassy in Rabat, Morocco.

== Labor relations ==
As of 2014, there are more than 3,000 Overseas Filipino Workers in Morocco.

== Resident diplomatic missions ==
- Morocco has an embassy in Manila.
- Philippines has an embassy in Rabat.

== See also ==
- Foreign relations of the Philippines
- Foreign relations of Morocco
