= EU–Morocco Fisheries Partnership Agreement =

The EU-Moroccan Fisheries Partnership Agreement (FPA) is a fisheries agreement between the European Community (EC) and Morocco that allows European fishing vessels to fish off the shores of Morocco. The FPA allows community vessels from 11 Member States to fish in Moroccan waters and can be considered as one of the major fisheries agreement for the EC. It was signed on 28 July 2005, concluded on 22 May 2006 and entered into force on 28 February 2007. The agreement is set to expire on 27 February 2011.

The agreement provides for the granting of 119 fishing licenses for Community vessels (mostly Spanish, but also from other EU countries) and for a total of 6000 tonnes of pelagic fish for industrial fishing by vessels from France, Germany, Greece, Ireland, Italy, Latvia, Lithuania, the Netherlands, Poland, Portugal and Spain. In exchange, the EU is to pay Morocco a financial contribution of 144 million €, plus around 13.6 million € to be paid as fees by the shipowners.

The agreement is less ambitious than its predecessors, both in terms of financial contribution and of number of licenses and of pelagic species included. In particular, it excludes the fishing of valuable cephalopods and crustaceans, reflecting the concern of Morocco for the depletion of its fishing stocks, and its efforts to develop its own industrial fishing fleet (by 2006, Morocco was already the top fish exporter in Africa).

The geographic scope of application of the FPA is controversial; its extension to Western Saharan waters is considered by many to entail a violation of international law. Morocco has occupied the larger part of Western Sahara since 1975, and controls the waters offshore the territory. Since Moroccan stocks are largely depleted, the bulk of the fisheries nowadays takes place offshore Western Sahara.

== Historical background ==
Large-scale fishing from mainland Spain in Moroccan waters began in the 1960s, with the expansion of the Spanish fishing industry, especially from Galicia. The 1975 Tripartite Agreement between Spain, Morocco and Mauritania (Madrid Agreement) included a commitment by Morocco not to impair the access of Spanish fishermen to the waters of Western Sahara. A first fisheries treaty signed in 1977 between Morocco and Spain never entered into force; a second was signed in 1983 and foresaw two different areas of application, north and south of Cape Noun, thus designating the latter as Western Saharan waters, in order not to imply a recognition of Moroccan sovereignty.

The accession of Spain and Portugal in the European Economic Community (EEC) in 1986 led to an exclusive EC competence on fisheries, also in its external relations.

The first fisheries agreement between the EC and Morocco was signed in 1988. The 4-year agreement provided 800 annual licenses for Spanish and Portuguese trawlers, and contained no restrictions on quantities or species. In return Morocco received 282 million Euro.

The 1992 EC-Moroccan Fisheries Agreement provided better conditions for Morocco in terms of financial compensation (310 million Euro) and longer biological rest periods. Yet disagreements over license use led an early termination of the agreement in April 1995. The 1992–95 agreement, in its Annex I, mentioned the port of Dakhla, thus indicating the inclusion of Western Sahara in its geographical scope.

A modified agreement was signed in November 1995. Financial compensation now amounted to 355 million Euros, of which a substantial part was earmarked for the development of the industrial fisheries sector, marine research and the training of Moroccan fishermen.

When the agreement expired in November 1999, Morocco opposed renewal because it wanted to prevent total exhaustion of fish stocks. This created problems for the Spanish and Portuguese fishing fleets, who had always been the main beneficiaries of fishing licenses under the European Community's fisheries agreements with Morocco. Both had to undergo a process of restructuring and downscaling. There was no agreement into force until this new fisheries partnership agreement initialled in July 2005.

== Geographical scope of application ==
The geographic scope of application of the FPA is controversial; its extension to Western Saharan waters is considered by many to entail a violation of international law.

According to art. 2(a) of the agreement, EU fisheries can take place in "the waters falling within the sovereignty or jurisdiction of the Kingdom of Morocco", as it was defined also in all previous agreements. It does therefore not limit itself to the area under direct sovereignty of the Moroccan authorities, but includes further areas under its jurisdiction, e.g. its maritime exclusive economic zone but also the waters of Western Sahara. As such, the agreement neither includes nor excludes explicitly the waters of Western Sahara

The agreement came under fire for failing to specify the southern limit of Morocco in its geographical scope. Opponents of the agreements feared that this would allow Morocco to issue licenses to European vessels to fish in the waters of Western Sahara, the former Spanish colony that was invaded by Morocco in 1975.

The territorial ambiguity led Sweden to vote against the agreement in the EU Council, stating that "Western Sahara is not part of the territory of Morocco under international law and a process is under way to find a just, lasting and mutually accepted political solution to the conflict". Finland, Ireland and the Netherlands agreed with the Swedish position, but did not vote against the deal, opting instead to abstain. These countries did issue separate statements, outlining their concerns.

== Compliance with international law ==
=== 2002 UN legal opinion ===
In 2002, the UN Legal Counsel had stated that natural resources activity in Western Sahara can only take place in accordance with the wishes and interests of the people of the territory. In 2008, the author of the UN Opinion heavily criticised the EU for having misused his analysis to adopt the FPA, an agreement which is in violation of international law. The UN Opinion was echoed in the legal opinion delivered by the European Parliament's legal services in 2009, which concluded that Saharawi people have not been consulted in relation to the FPA and that there is no proof that they are benefiting from it, as international law demands.

=== Legal opinions of the EU institutions ===
The compatibility of the agreement with international law has been the object of two legal opinions prepared by the legal services of the European Parliament and of the Council of the European Union. The Parliament's opinion has been released (though partially), while the council's remains unpublished.

According to the legal services of the European Parliament, the agreement does neither include nor exclude the waters of Western Sahara from its geographical scope, and it would thus be up to Morocco to comply with its international obligations. The European Community could eventually suspend the agreement, if Morocco was found disregarding the interests of the people of Western Sahara. Notwithstanding the positive legal opinion, a large minority in the European Parliament asked for the explicit exclusion of Western Sahara from the geographical scope of the agreement. Finally, the Parliament adopted the treaty, asking the council to strengthen the monitoring mechanisms.

The written opinion of the legal services of the Council of the European Union, though not made public, reportedly arrives at the same conclusions as the Parliament. In the council's vote, Sweden voted against and Finland abstained. No amendment requested by the Parliament was adopted.

=== Claims of lack of legal validity with regards to Western Sahara ===
==== For lack of competence of Morocco to conclude an agreement on Western Sahara's fisheries ====
According to Enrico Milano, the validity of the agreement concerning the waters of Western Sahara is viciated, since Morocco does not have sovereignty over such territory, is not an administering Power, nor does its presence find other legal justifications (e.g. consent by the former administrative power Spain, by the UN Security Council, or by the Saharawi people).

Western Sahara remains considered by the UN as a non-self governing territory (NSGT), and Spain did not intend (nor could) transfer the competence of administering Power to Morocco and Mauritania with the 1976 tripartite Madrid Agreement. As stated by the ICJ in the East Timor case, "a state occupying a NSGT without a proper legal basis lacks legal capacity to create international legal rights and obligations concerning that territory"

Even in the unlikely scenario that Morocco was to be considered the new administering power, the principle of self-determination of peoples restricts the colonial power to enter into treaties concerning the territory once a process of national liberation has started

The lack of sovereignty and of administering Power status of Morocco for what concerns Western Sahara was noticed also by the legal opinion of the European Parliament, which nevertheless failed to conclude for the lack of competence of Morocco to conclude an agreement with the EU on the issue. In 2006, the EU Commissioner for fisheries, Mr. Borg, referring to the UN legal opinion, stated that "agreements can be concluded with the Kingdom of Morocco concerning the natural resources of Western Sahara" since the UN legal opinion "implies that Morocco is a de facto administrative power ... and consequently has the competence to conclude such type of agreement". According to Milano, the Commission underestimated the difference between the object of the UN legal opinion, concerning contracts with foreign companies for oil and explorations, and the nature of the FPA, an international agreement not assimilable to a contract, requiring a different and stronger competence by Morocco.

==== For violation of the principle of permanent sovereignty over natural resources as applied to NSGTs ====
According to Enrico Milano, a second legal ground for the lack of validity of the FPA with regards to its extension to Western Saharan waters lies in the principle of permanent sovereignty over natural resources. This principle entails the obligation that economic activities related to the NSGT should be carried out in accordance with both the wishes and the interests of its people.

The EU legal opinions, though arguing that rules of international law should be respected also by the EC when exercising its powers in place of its member states, enact a very narrow reading of the right of the people of Western Sahara and of the corresponding obligations of third parties, identifying Morocco as the main bearer of obligations towards the Western Sahara people and stating that it cannot be presumed that Morocco will not comply with them. According to Milano, since fishing is carried out by European vessels and since the Community has an active role in allowing this economic activity, by directly asking Morocco the issuance of licenses, the EU is directly bound to respect its international obligations owed to the people of that territory, when entering into a fishing agreement extending to a NSGT.

To be valid according to the principle of permanent sovereignty over natural resources, therefore, the agreement should be conducted for the interest of the local (Saharawi) people and according to their wishes, as expressed by their legitimate representatives (the Polisario and the SADR government). This was also the opinion of Sweden during the EU Council vote. Lacking this element, the FPA cannot be considered valid for what concerns the territory of Western Sahara.

==== Consequences ====
For the reasons above, Milano finds that "the FPA may be found invalid to the extent that it intends to create international rights concerning the use of fisheries in the Western Sahara's waters". This would imply that the EU cannot rely on the FPA to request the issuing of fishing licenses for Western Saharan waters, that Morocco cannot oppose it to the EU to complain about fishing conducts in Western Saharan waters, and that the EU cannot oppose the FPA as binding to a future Western Saharan administration.

=== Applicability of the duty of non-recognition ===
The FPA has been challenged by legal scholars also concerning a possible breach by the European Union of the duty of non-recognition of situations resulting from a serious violation of peremptory norms of international law.

For what concerns whether the duty of non-recognition is binding also upon international organisations, these are bound as much as States are, to respect such a duty of non-recognition, and the European Court of Justice has recognised that the Community is bound to respect customary international law. Moreover, even if member states have no subsidiary responsibility for the action of and international organisation with its area of exclusive competence, they do have a separate responsibility for breach of obligation incumbent upon them when acting within intergovernmental bodies, in terms of their individual conduct at the time of voting. In the case of the FPA any good faith exemption would be rejected due to the clear unwillingness by the EU institutions to exclude explicitly Western Sahara from the geographical scope of the agreement.

For what concerns whether the duty of non-recognition applies to Morocco's de facto administration of Western Sahara, such a duty holds for situations of e.g. attempted acquisition of sovereignty over territory through the denial of the right of self-determination of peoples, and includes treaty relations between third states and countries purporting to act on behalf of or concerning the occupied or annexing territory. Moreover, the duty of non-recognition arises independently from the action of the UN Security Council, so that any third party has to make its own assessment about it.

According to Enrico Milano, if the FPA was to be extended in practice to the waters of Western Sahara, the EC action may also be found in violation of its obligation of non-recognition. The extension of the FPA's territorial scope to Western Sahara represents an act of implied recognition by the Union of an unlawful territorial situation representing a continuing violation of ius cogens norms since over thirty years.

=== EC practices necessary to ensure the legality of its conduct under international law ===
In the Ali Yusuf case, the ECJ uphold that EU Law should be interpreted, and eventually limited in its scope, in the light of the relevant rules of international law. According to Enrico Milano, in order to remain in compliance with international law, the FPA should be limited to the territorial waters of Morocco proper, excluding Western Sahara, as already upheld by the Commission previously, in 1988: "the extent of these waters must be determined in accordance with international law". At the end, it is up to the EU not to seek licenses from Morocco for fishing in Western Sahara's waters.

== See also ==
- Morocco–European Union relations
