= Azerbaijan–Morocco relations =

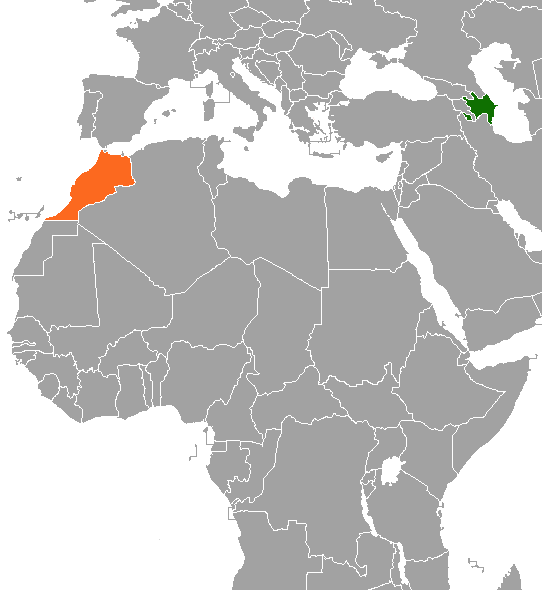

- Azerbaijan: Morocco

Bilateral relations between Azerbaijan and Morocco were established in 1992. Azerbaijan has an embassy in Rabat. Morocco has an embassy in Baku. The two countries cooperate in such areas as agriculture, energy, transport, education, the private sector, tourism, logistics, telecommunications, construction, etc.

== Diplomatic relations ==
On December 30, 1991, Morocco recognized the independence of Azerbaijan. Diplomatic relations between Azerbaijan and Morocco were established on August 25, 1992.

On December 12, 1994, a protocol on cooperation was signed between the Ministries of Foreign Affairs of Azerbaijan and Morocco in Casablanca.

The first official visit of Azerbaijani President Heydar Aliyev to Morocco took place in 1994.

Azerbaijan's representative office in Morocco was opened in September 2006. The Embassy of Morocco to Azerbaijan was opened in November 2008.

On September 28, 2007, the inter-governmental commission on bilateral cooperation between Azerbaijan and Morocco was established.

The ambassador of Azerbaijan to Morocco is Ogtay Gurbanov. The ambassador of Morocco to Azerbaijan is Mohammed Adil Ambarch.

On March 5, 2018, Moroccan Foreign Minister Nasser Bourita met his Azerbaijani counterpart Elmar Mammadyarov. During the event, a meeting of the Intergovernmental Commission was held, where a number of agreements were signed:

1. Convention for the avoidance of double taxation and tax evasion;
2. Intergovernmental agreement on cooperation in the field of security and combating crime;
3. Protocol of intent between railway agencies;
4. Protocol of intent between the State Maritime Academy of Azerbaijan and the Higher Institute for Marine Research of Morocco.

On October 30, 2018, a memorandum was signed between the State Agency of Azerbaijan for Public Service and Social Innovation and the Government of Morocco.

Legal framework: 20 documents have been signed between Azerbaijan and Morocco.

== Economic cooperation ==
According to the State Customs Committee of Azerbaijan, in 2017, the trade turnover amounted to approximately 3.9 million US dollars.

Oil companies in Morocco cooperate with the State Oil Company of Azerbaijan (SOCAR).

Trade turnover (in millions of US dollars)

Year	Import	Export	Trade turnover
2014	55,7	38,5	94,2
2015	4587.13	53.58	4640.71
2016	2838.30	00.00	2838.30
2017	3879,1	2,8	3881,9
2018	4445,7	0,4	4446,1

== Cultural ties ==
Days of Azerbaijani culture were held in Rabat on March 2–4, 2008. As part of this event, the Azerbaijan-Moroccan Friendship Society was established.

In March 2008, the two countries signed an agreement on intercultural cooperation.

On October 16–19, 2009, Days of Moroccan culture were held in the capital city of Baku.

The Days of Azerbaijani culture were held in Rabat on October 26 – November 1, 2010.

In March 2011, a Protocol on cooperation was signed between the Ministry of Youth and Sports of Azerbaijan and Morocco in Rabat.

On November 11–13, 2011, days of Moroccan culture were held in Baku.

On October 4–9, 2012, former chairman of the House of representatives of the Parliament of Morocco A. Radi, rector of the Mohammad University and president of the Diplomatic Enterprise A. Gabek visited Azerbaijan to participate in the Second International Humanitarian Forum held in Baku.

In January 2015, the faculty of Philology of the Mohammad University in Rabat organized training and compiled programs on the Azerbaijani language and culture.

In May 2015, at the initiative of the State Committee for work with religious organizations of Azerbaijan and ISESCO, a conference on "Dialogue of religions and models for promoting mutual understanding of cultures in the Muslim world" was held in Rabat. The conference was attended by representatives of ISESCO, the State Committee for work with religious organizations of Azerbaijan, ambassadors of Azerbaijan, China, Malaysia, Turkey to Morocco, members of the diplomatic corps, members of the society of Moroccan-Azerbaijani friendship, etc. Moreover, the exhibition "Azerbaijan – the pearl of Islamic culture" was organized.

In 2019, the possibility of establishing twinning relations between the Azerbaijani city of Ganja and the Moroccan city of Marrakesh was discussed.

As part of the meeting between the director of the National Museum of Azerbaijan and the Minister of Culture, Youth and Sports of Morocco, Alhasan Abyaba, a program of cooperation between the countries in the field of culture was drawn up and discussed. Then there was a meeting between Shirin Melikova and the president of the National Museum Foundation of Morocco, Mehdi Gotbi. Joint projects were discussed, and a Memorandum of cooperation was signed.

== Justice ==
In March 2011, the Minister of Justice of Morocco, Mohammad Nasir, visited Azerbaijan. During the talks, the parties discussed drafts of the first interstate treaties on extradition, legal cooperation in civil and commercial matters, mutual legal assistance in criminal matters, as well as cooperation agreements between the ministries of justice of both countries. The importance of conducting training for lawyers was noted.

== International cooperation ==
In the international arena, cooperation between countries is carried out within the framework of various international organizations: the Organization of Islamic Cooperation (OIC), UN, etc.

Morocco supports Azerbaijan's position on the Nagorno-Karabakh conflict. Azerbaijan supports the position of Morocco on the question of Western Sahara.

On February 21, 2012, the fifth conference of responsible Ministers for children of the Islamic Educational, Scientific and Cultural Organization (ISESCO) was held in the capital city of Rabat. Chairman of the State Committee of Azerbaijan on Family, Women and Children issues Hijran Huseynova paid a working visit to Morocco. A bilateral meeting was held with ISESCO Director General Abdulaziz al-Tuwaijri. The importance of projects implemented by the Heydar Aliyev Foundation such as "A new school for the new Azerbaijan", "Development of boarding schools and orphanages", "Providing access to information and communication technologies for people who have lost the ability to see and with weak eyesight", etc. was noted.

In October 2018, at the 58th meeting of the General Assembly of the member States of the World Intellectual Property Organization (WIPO) in Geneva, the chairman of the board of the Azerbaijan Intellectual Property Agency, Kamran Imanov, announced Azerbaijan's accession to the Moroccan Treaty on facilitating access to published works of the blind and visually impaired or other persons with disabilities to perceive printed information.

On June 12, 2018, President of Azerbaijan Ilham Aliyev signed the law "on accession to the" Moroccan Treaty on facilitating access to published works for the blind and visually impaired or otherwise visually impaired". This agreement entered into force on December 24, 2018.

== Resident diplomatic missions ==
- Azerbaijan has an embassy in Rabat.
- Morocco has an embassy in Baku.

== See also ==
- Foreign relations of Azerbaijan
- Foreign relations of Morocco
