= Morocco–Turkey relations =

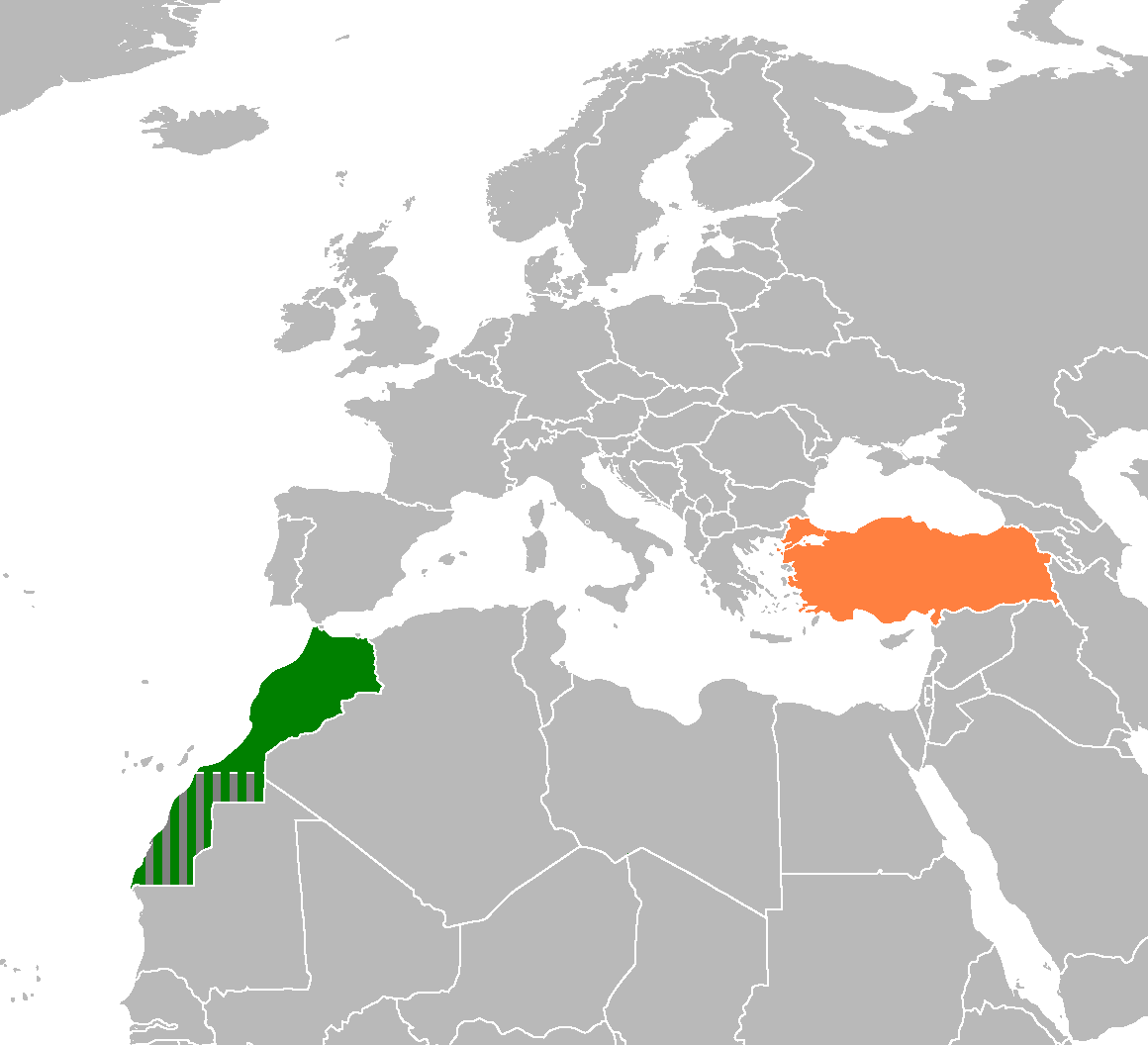
- Morocco: Turkey

Diplomatic mission
- Moroccan embassy, Ankara: Turkish embassy, Rabat

Morocco–Turkey relations are the foreign relations between Morocco and Turkey. Diplomatic relations between Turkey and Morocco were established on 17 April 1956 by a joint declaration of the Governments of the two countries; following the proclamation of independence of the Kingdom of Morocco.

== Free trade agreement ==
The Turkish-Moroccan Free Trade Agreement (FTA) entered into force on 1 January 2006. The foreign trade balance between the two countries is in favor of Turkey. This agreement was later revised for more equitable terms for Morocco in 2013 by Moulay Hafid Elalamy, the former Moroccan Minister of Industry. Except the decline in 2009 as a result of the global economic crisis, the volume of annual bilateral trade is over US$1 billion. In 2010, the trade volume increased by 22% and reached US$1.02 billion of which US$624 million is the export volume of Turkey. Turkey is the 12th export and 10th import partner of Morocco.

== European Union ==
In 1987, both Morocco and Turkey applied for membership of the European Coal and Steel Community, a predecessor of the European Union. Morocco's application was turned down as it was not considered European, but Turkey's application was considered eligible on the basis of the 1963 Ankara Association Agreement, but the opinion of the Commission on the possible candidate status had become negative. Turkey did not receive European Union candidate status until 1999 and began official membership negotiations in 2005. Currently, 11 of the 35 chapters have been opened with Turkey, with 1 already closed. On 24 November 2016, the European Parliament votes to suspend accession negotiations with Turkey over human rights and rule of law concerns. On 26 June 2018, the EU's General Affairs Council stated that "the Council notes that Turkey has been moving further away from the European Union. Turkey's accession negotiations have therefore effectively come to a standstill and no further chapters can be considered for opening or closing and no further work towards the modernisation of the EU-Turkey Customs Union is foreseen." The Council added that it is "especially concerned about the continuing and deeply worrying backsliding on the rule of law and on fundamental rights including the freedom of expression."

Morocco has in recent years changed its geopolitical order line and developed a partnership within African Continent. As of 2015, it is a full member of the African Union.

== Controversies ==
In late November 2025 Morocco accused Tawakkol Karman and Belqees TV of encouraging violence, hate, and support for terrorism, and of insulting Moroccan state institutions. These claims are based on things she allegedly said and posted online during protests in Morocco. Morocco filed a legal complaint through the Moroccan Lawyers Club, Turkey treated it as a criminal case, stopped Belqees TV from broadcasting, and shut down its offices there.

== Resident diplomatic missions ==
- Morocco has an embassy in Ankara and a consulate-general in Istanbul.
- Turkey has an embassy in Rabat.

== See also ==
- Foreign relations of Morocco
- Foreign relations of Turkey
