= Indonesia–Morocco relations =

- Indonesia: Morocco

Diplomatic mission
- Embassy of Indonesia, Rabat: Embassy of Morocco, Jakarta

Envoy
- Ambassador Hasrul Azwar: Ambassador Ouadia Benabdellah

Indonesia and Morocco established diplomatic relations in 1960. Both are the Muslim-majority countries; Indonesia is the most populous Muslim country in the world, while Morocco is also a Muslim majority nation. Morocco praised Indonesia as a strong democratic nation, and pointed out that both nations face the same challenges of separatism and terrorism. Diplomatic relations were established in 1960. Indonesia has an embassy in Rabat and a consulate in Casablanca, while Morocco has an embassy in Jakarta. Both nations are members of the World Trade Organization (WTO), Group of 77, Non-Aligned Movement and Organisation of Islamic Cooperation (OIC).

== History ==
The historical ties between Morocco and Indonesia date back to the 14th century, when Ibn Battuta, a Moroccan traveller, in 1345 visited the court of Samudera Pasai Sultanate in present-day Aceh, Northern Sumatra. In his record he testified that the Sultan of Samudra performed his religious duties piously and observed the madhhab of Imam Al-Shafi‘i. At that time Samudra Pasai was the end of Dar al-Islam, for no territory east of this was ruled by a Muslim ruler. Here he stayed for about two weeks in the wooden walled town as a guest of the sultan, and then the sultan provided him with supplies and sent him on his way on one of his own junks to China.

In 1955, Indonesia organized the Asian-African Conference, which called for the independence and decolonialization of Asian and African countries from European colonialism. The movement has inspired Moroccans in their struggle, and they finally achieved independence from France on 18 November 1956. Indonesia and Morocco officially established diplomatic relations on April 19, 1960. Subsequently, Indonesia's first president Sukarno arrived in Rabat on May 2, 1960, and paid a courtesy call to King Mohammed V. In 2008, Indonesian Foreign Minister Hassan Wirajuda visited Rabat. Moroccan Prime Minister Abbas El Fassi visited Jakarta in March 2009.

Jakarta and Casablanca, Morocco's largest city, signed a sister city agreement on September 21, 1990. To promote friendship between the two nations, Jalan Casablanca, a main avenue famous for its shopping and business centers in South Jakarta, was named after Jakarta's Moroccan sister city. In Rabat, Morocco's capital city, an avenue was named after Sukarno, to commemorate his visit in 1960 also as a token of friendship.

== Trade and commerce ==
Indonesia and Morocco agreed to establish a Joint Commission in 2013 to improve relations in investment, tourism, trade, and human resources sectors. This agreement was concluded on March 12, 2013, during Indonesian Minister of Tourism and Creative Economy Mari Elka Pangestu's visit in Rabat, to meet Moroccan Minister of Foreign Affairs and Cooperation Saad El Dine-Otmani, Tourism Minister Lahcen Haddad and Secretary General of the Ministry of Industry, Trade and New Technologies El Aid Mahsoussi. The volume of bilateral trade increased from $35.99 million in 2003 to US$109.31 million in 2008. Indonesia's main import from Morocco is phosphate, the main material in fertilizer production. Other Indonesian imports from Morocco are fertilizers, chemicals, iron and steel rods; exports to Morocco include coffee, natural rubber, glassware, palm oil, spices, tea, furniture and garments.

== See also ==
- Foreign relations of Indonesia
- Foreign relations of Morocco
