= List of diplomatic missions in Morocco =

This is a list of diplomatic missions in Morocco. There are currently 122 embassies in Rabat, and many countries maintain consulates in other Moroccan cities (not including honorary consulates). Several other nations have embassies accredited to Morocco but resident in other capitals.

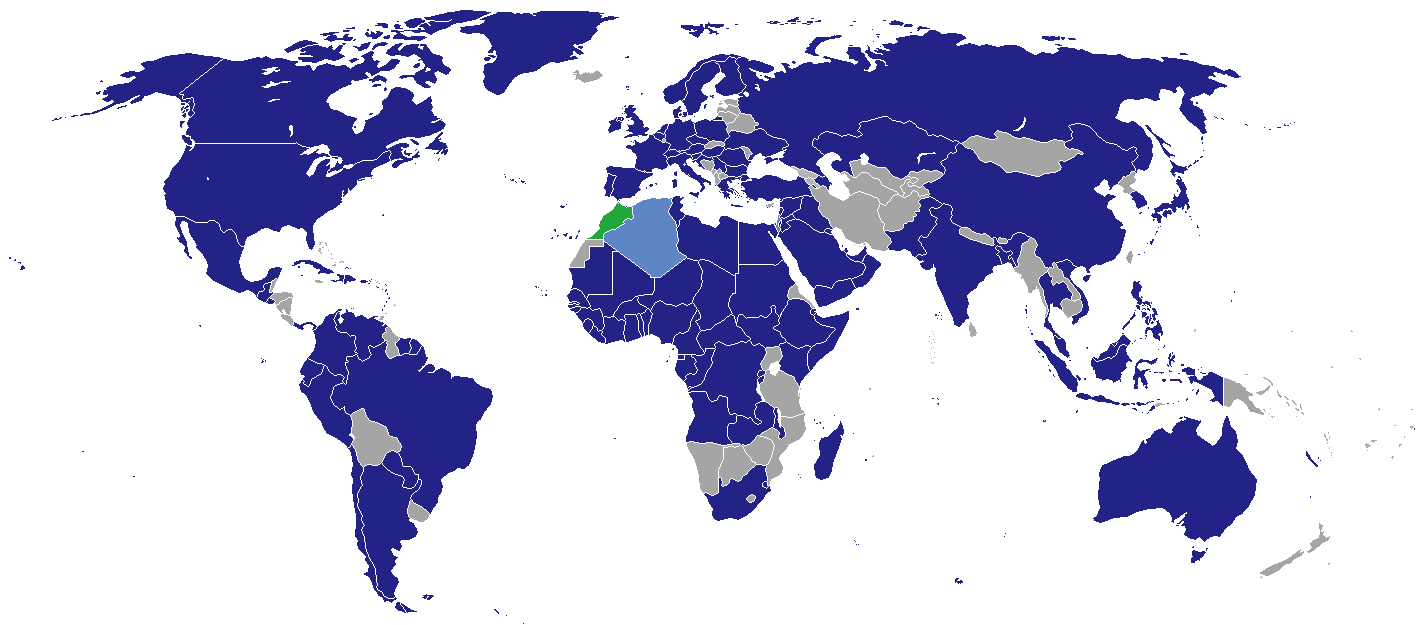
Map of diplomatic missions in Morocco

== Diplomatic missions in Rabat ==
=== Embassies ===
1. Algeria
2. Angola
3. Antigua and Barbuda
4. Argentina
5. Australia
6. Austria
7. Azerbaijan
8. Bahrain
9. Bangladesh
10. Belgium
11. Benin
12. Brazil
13. Brunei
14. Bulgaria
15. Burkina Faso
16. Burundi
17. Cameroon
18. Canada
19. Cape Verde
20. Central African Republic
21. Chad
22. Chile
23. China
24. Colombia
25. Comoros
26. Congo-Brazzaville
27. Congo-Kinshasa
28. Croatia
29. Cuba
30. Czech Republic
31. Denmark
32. Djibouti
33. Dominica
34. Dominican Republic
35. Ecuador
36. Egypt
37. El Salvador
38. Equatorial Guinea
39. Eswatini
40. Ethiopia
41. Finland
42. France
43. Gabon
44. Gambia
45. Germany
46. Ghana
47. Greece
48. Grenada
49. Guatemala
50. Guinea
51. Guinea-Bissau
52. Haiti
53. Holy See
54. Hungary
55. India
56. Indonesia
57. Iraq
58. Ireland
59. Italy
60. Ivory Coast
61. Japan
62. Jordan
63. Kazakhstan
64. Kenya
65. Kuwait
66. Lebanon
67. Liberia
68. Libya
69. Madagascar
70. Malaysia
71. Malawi
72. Mali
73. Mauritania
74. Mexico
75. Netherlands
76. Niger
77. Nigeria
78. Norway
79. Oman
80. Pakistan
81. Palestine
82. Panama
83. Paraguay
84. Peru
85. Philippines
86. Poland
87. Portugal
88. Qatar
89. Romania
90. Russia
91. Rwanda
92. Saint Kitts and Nevis
93. Saint Lucia
94. Saint Vincent and the Grenadines
95. São Tomé and Príncipe
96. Saudi Arabia
97. Senegal
98. Serbia
99. Sierra Leone
100. Slovenia
101. Somalia
102. South Africa
103. South Korea
104. South Sudan
105. Sovereign Military Order of Malta
106. Spain
107. Sudan
108. Suriname
109. Sweden
110. Switzerland
111. Syria
112. Thailand
113. Togo
114. Tunisia
115. Turkey
116. Ukraine
117. United Arab Emirates
118. United Kingdom
119. United States
120. Venezuela
121. Vietnam
122. Yemen
123. Zambia

=== Other missions or delegations ===
1. European Union (Delegation)
2. French Community of Belgium (General Delegation)
3. Israel (Liaison Office - to be upgraded into an embassy)
4. Quebec (Government Office)

=== Gallery ===
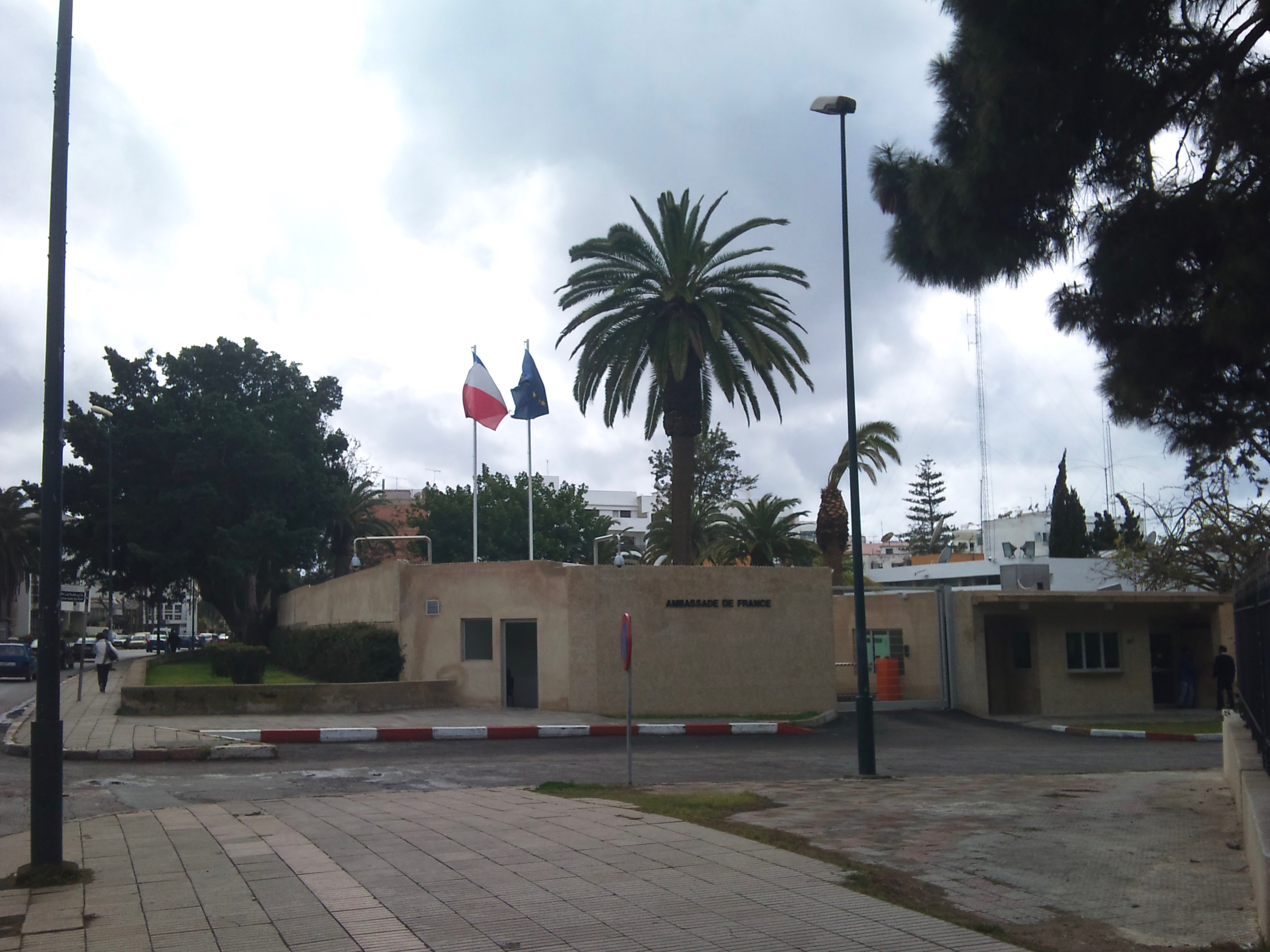
Embassy of France

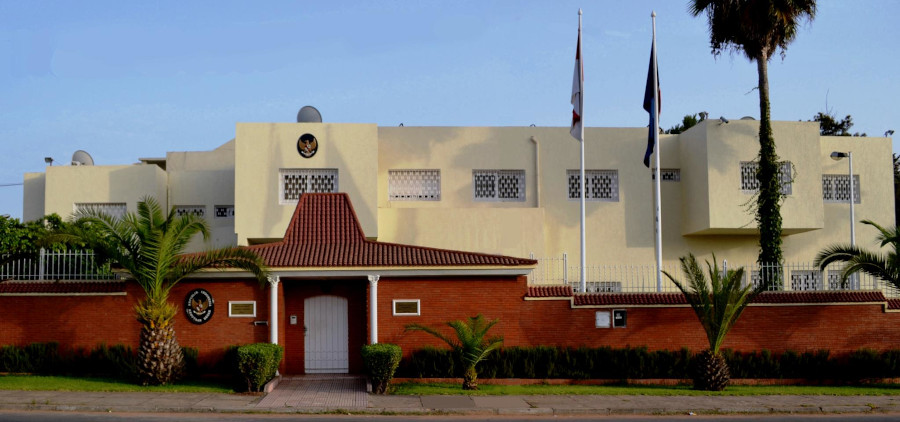
Embassy of Indonesia

Embassy of the Philippines

== Consular missions ==
=== Agadir ===
- France (Consulate General)
- Spain (Consulate-General)

=== Casablanca ===
- Algeria (Consulate-General)
- France (Consulate-General)
- Italy
- Libya (Consulate-General)
- Malta (Consulate-General)
- Russia
- Senegal
- Spain (Consulate-General)
- United Kingdom
- United States (Consulate-General)

=== Dakhla ===
- Burkina Faso
- Cape Verde
- Chad
- Congo-Kinshasa
- Djibouti
- Equatorial Guinea
- Gambia
- Guatemala
- Guinea
- Guinea-Bissau
- Haiti
- Liberia
- Senegal
- Sierra Leone
- Suriname
- Togo

=== Fez ===
- France

=== Larache ===
- Spain (Consulate-General)

=== Laayoune ===
- Bahrain
- Burundi (Consulate General)
- Central African Republic
- Comoros
- Eswatini
- Gabon
- Ivory Coast
- Jordan
- Malawi
- São Tomé and Príncipe
- United Arab Emirates
- Zambia

=== Marrakesh ===
- France

=== Nador ===
- Spain (Consulate-General)

=== Oujda ===
- Algeria (Consulate)

=== Tangier ===
- France (Consulate General)
- Spain (Consulate-General)
- United Kingdom

=== Tétouan ===
- Spain (Consulate-General)

== Non-resident embassies accredited to Morocco ==
=== Resident in Cairo, Egypt ===
- Cambodia
- Mozambique
- Myanmar
- Nepal
- Sri Lanka
- Tajikistan

=== Resident in Lisbon, Portugal ===
- Cyprus
- Estonia
- Moldova

=== Resident in Madrid, Spain ===
- Afghanistan
- Albania
- Bolivia
- Bosnia and Herzegovina
- Georgia
- Honduras
- New Zealand
- Slovakia
- Uruguay

=== Resident in Paris, France ===
- Iceland
- Laos
- Latvia
- Lithuania
- Nicaragua
- Tanzania

=== Resident in other cities ===
- Belarus (Tripoli)
- Botswana (Addis Ababa)
- Eritrea (Riyadh)
- Kyrgyzstan (Kuwait City)
- Lesotho (Kuwait City)
- Maldives (Geneva)
- Malta (Valletta)
- San Marino (San Marino)
- Seychelles (Addis Ababa)
- Singapore (Singapore)
- Turkmenistan (Ankara)
- Uganda (Khartoum)
- Uzbekistan (Riyadh)
- Zimbabwe (Accra)

== Embassies to open ==
- Bolivia
- Bosnia and Herzegovina
- Israel
- Slovakia
- Uruguay

== Former embassies ==
- Iran (closed in 2018)
- Vanuatu

== See also ==
- Foreign relations of Morocco
- List of diplomatic missions of Morocco
