= Malaysia–Morocco relations =

- Malaysia: Morocco

Malaysia–Morocco relations refers to bilateral foreign relations between Malaysia and Morocco. Malaysia has an embassy in Rabat, and Morocco has an embassy in Kuala Lumpur. Both countries are members of the Organisation of Islamic Cooperation.

== History ==
Morocco established relations with Malaysia right after Malaysia's been formed in 1963. On 15 April 2002, Malaysian Prime Minister Mahathir Mohamad left for Morocco. In 2010, Abdul Khalid Ibrahim who is the Menteri Besar of Selangor made a working visit to Morocco. While Moroccan former Minister of Tourism also made a visit to Malaysia on the same year.

== Economic relations ==
Several agreements and memorandum of understanding has been signed between the two countries. In 2008, the total trade between Malaysia and Morocco reached nearly $65 million. The total Malaysian exports to Morocco reached $50.6 million while Moroccan exports to Malaysia worth around $14.4 million. Malaysian exports are such as consumer products, electrical and electronic products, plastic, chemical materials and products, manufactured metals, products of animal origin, textile and clothing, rubber products, transportation equipment while Morocco exports were copper, semi products, mineral goods and other finished products. While investments from Malaysia are mainly in oil and gas in which Petronas is involved. Other Malaysian companies also has been invited to invest in Morocco especially on the housing sector and both countries working close on palm oil.

== Education relations ==
Between 2008 and 2009, 15 Moroccan scholarships were awarded to Malaysian students to undertake Arabic language and Islamic studies at Moroccan universities.

== Cultural links ==
Moorish architecture influences also can be found on several buildings in Putrajaya, which is the Malaysia's federal governments administrative centre.

== Cyber security ==
A memorandum of understanding on computer security were also signed to become close partners in cyber security.

== Resident diplomatic missions ==
- Malaysia has an embassy in Rabat.
- Morocco has an embassy in Kuala Lumpur.

== See also ==
- Foreign relations of Malaysia
- Foreign relations of Morocco
