= Egypt–Morocco relations =

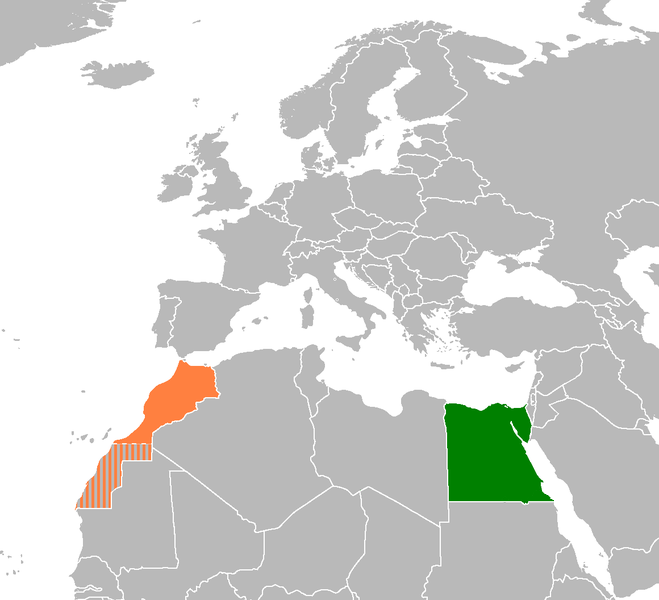
- Egypt: Morocco

Egypt–Morocco relations refers to the bilateral relations between Morocco and Egypt. Since independence, the two nations have maintained warm relations. Egypt has an embassy in Rabat. Morocco has an embassy in Cairo. Both countries are members of the African Union, Arab League, GAFTA, Non-Aligned Movement, Group of 77, Organisation of Islamic Cooperation, and the Council of Arab Economic Unity.

== Political support ==
Egypt has repeatedly reiterated its support for Morocco's territorial integrity. "Egypt has always backed Morocco's efforts to perfect its territorial integrity," Egyptian deputy minister of foreign affairs, Jamal-Eddine Bayoumi told Moroccan daily Al-Mounaataf. Bayoumi also stressed the need for Morocco and Egypt to consolidate trade relations among Arab states.

== Economic cooperation ==
Morocco and Egypt are both signers of the Agadir Agreement for the Establishment of a Free Trade Zone between the Arabic Mediterranean Nations, signed in Rabat, Morocco on 25 February 2004. The agreement aimed at establishing a free trade area between Jordan, Tunisia, Egypt and Morocco and it was seen as a possible first step in the establishment of the Euro-Mediterranean free trade area as envisaged in the Barcelona Process. They are also founding members of GAFTA, a pact made by the Arab League to achieve a complete Arab economic bloc that can compete internationally.

Rebalancing Trade between Egypt and Morocco

Trade relations between Egypt and Morocco witnessed a remarkable development after an Egyptian trade delegation visited Rabat in March 2025, where it was agreed to reduce the trade gap that is in favor of Egyptian exports. This visit came after the suspension of the entry of Egyptian goods into Moroccan ports, which raised concerns among investors.

The trade disputes relate to Egypt's failure to abide by the terms of the Agadir Agreement, which aims to enhance trade cooperation between Arab Mediterranean countries. Morocco accused Egypt of exporting products of non-local origin, while it faced difficulties in exporting its goods to Egypt due to their detention in customs.

According to trade reports, Egyptian exports to Morocco recorded a growth of 22.5%, while Egyptian imports from Morocco increased by 91%. Morocco also imposed protective fees on some Egyptian products in an attempt to reduce the trade deficit.

During the ministerial meeting, it was agreed to take concrete steps to restore trade balance, including establishing a direct line of communication between the relevant authorities, increasing Moroccan exports to Egypt, and organizing a business forum in Cairo. Observers expect these measures to contribute to enhancing trade between the two countries and achieving a more balanced partnership.

== See also ==
- Foreign relations of Egypt
- Foreign relations of Morocco
- Arab Maghreb Union
- Western Sahara War
