= Embassy of the Philippines, Rabat =

Diplomatic mission of the Philippines in Morocco

Embassy of the Philippines, Rabat Pasuguan ng Pilipinas sa Rabat سفارة الفلبين في الرباط

- Location: Rabat
- Address: 28, Rue Bani Ritoune, Souissi
- Coordinates: 33°58′3.9″N 6°49′57.6″W
- Ambassador: Leslie J. Baja
- Website: Official website

The Embassy of the Philippines in Rabat is the diplomatic mission of the Republic of the Philippines to the Kingdom of Morocco. It is currently located in the Souissi neighborhood of southern Rabat, near the Finnish, Norwegian and Russian embassies. Although the current embassy dates from 2019, the Philippines maintained a previous resident embassy in Morocco from 1979 to 1986, and again from 1990 to 1993.

== History ==
Although relations between the Philippines and Morocco were established on April 10, 1975, the Philippines did not immediately open a resident mission in Morocco. A first embassy was opened in 1979, but was closed in 1986 after the People Power Revolution. A second embassy was established in 1990, but was closed in 1993 due to financial constraints. While there was no resident embassy in Morocco, the country was under the jurisdiction of other nearby missions, including the Philippine Embassy in Madrid, and the Philippine Embassy in Tripoli.

In 2019, Foreign Affairs Secretary Teodoro Locsin Jr. announced that the Philippine Embassy in Rabat would reopen, part of an expansion of the country's diplomatic presence under the administration of President Rodrigo Duterte. This was confirmed with Moroccan authorities after the two countries signed an air services agreement in September 2019, and the embassy provisionally reopened on December 27, 2019. However, its operations were hampered by the COVID-19 pandemic in Morocco, with the embassy not being able to actually operate until October 2020, after COVID-19 restrictions were eased in the country, and its inauguration was delayed until Independence Day, June 12, 2021.

== Staff and activities ==
The Philippine Embassy in Rabat is currently headed by Ambassador Leslie J. Baja, who was appointed to the position by President Duterte on December 3, 2020. Prior to becoming Ambassador, Baja, a career diplomat, previously served as Assistant Secretary for Middle East and African Affairs with the Department of Foreign Affairs. His appointment was confirmed by the Commission on Appointments on December 16, 2020, and Baja presented copies of his credentials to Moroccan Foreign Minister Nasser Bourita on June 14, 2021.

The embassy's activities center around providing to the welfare of Overseas Filipino Workers and other Filipinos in Morocco. Since its reopening, it has conducted consular and labor outreach missions throughout the country, including in Casablanca, Fez, Marrakesh, and Tangier. In addition to Morocco, the embassy also exercises jurisdiction over Guinea, Mali, Mauritania and Senegal.

After presenting his credentials to Mauritanian President Mohamed Ould Ghazouani, Baja proposed the establishment of a Philippine honorary consulate in Nouakchott, the Mauritanian capital, to strengthen the Philippines' presence in the country.

== See also ==
- Morocco–Philippines relations
- List of diplomatic missions of the Philippines
