= Argentina–Morocco relations =

- Morocco: Argentina

Foreign relations between the Argentine Republic and the Kingdom of Morocco, have existed for over half a century. Both countries are full members of the Group of 77.

== History ==
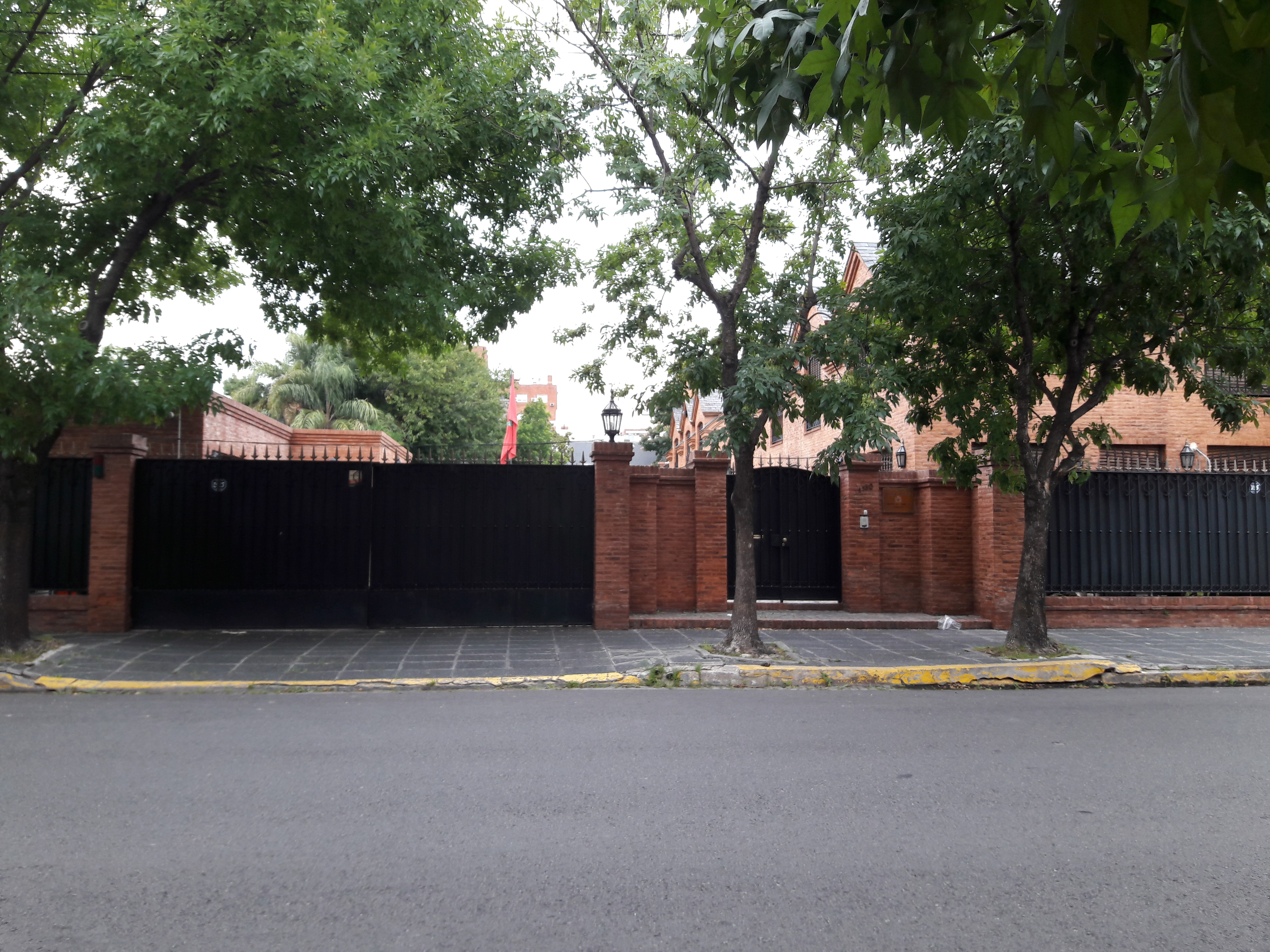
Embassy of Morocco in Buenos Aires

Argentina recognized Morocco's independence in 1956. Both countries established diplomatic relations in 1960. Argentina was one of the first countries recognizing Morocco's independence in 1956.

== Western Sahara issue ==
In 2003, former president of Argentina Eduardo Duhalde, renewed Buenos Aires' backing to Morocco's territorial integrity. In this era of globalisation, Argentina would not tolerate separatism and the creation of microscopic entities, the Argentine president said at a meeting in Buenos Aires with Ahmed Kadiri, vice-speaker of the Moroccan chamber of advisors, upper house of parliament.

Argentine ambassador in Morocco, Edgardo Piuzzi, in 2003 said that his country does not recognize Polisario and has always denounced the situation in Tindouf camps, in South Western Algeria. In an interview published by the Moroccan daily in Arabic Assahraa Al Maghribia, the Argentine diplomat termed as shameful the detention of Moroccan prisoners in Tindouf camps, for more than twenty five years, adding that Argentina has always upheld a clear stance: The Sahara is indubitably Moroccan.

== Economic relations ==
Morocco and Argentina signed in Rabat (2000) three major agreements on trade, fisheries and cooperation between the Moroccan Export Promotion Center (CMPE) and Argentine counterpart. The documents were initialed by foreign affairs minister Mohamed Benaissa and external relations minister of Argentina during the closing ceremony held in Rabat. Benaissa noted that the commission works were successful with the adoption of a large number of projects in the sectors of agriculture, fishery, housing, city planning, energy and mines, industry, equipment, tourism, investment, culture, education, scientific research and vocational training.

In 2016, Argentine exports to Morocco amounted to US$368.7 million and Moroccan exports to Argentina amounted to US$107.4 million.

== Resident diplomatic missions ==
- Argentina has an embassy in Rabat.
- Morocco has an embassy in Buenos Aires.

== See also ==
- Foreign relations of Argentina
- Foreign relations of Morocco
