= Mexico–Morocco relations =

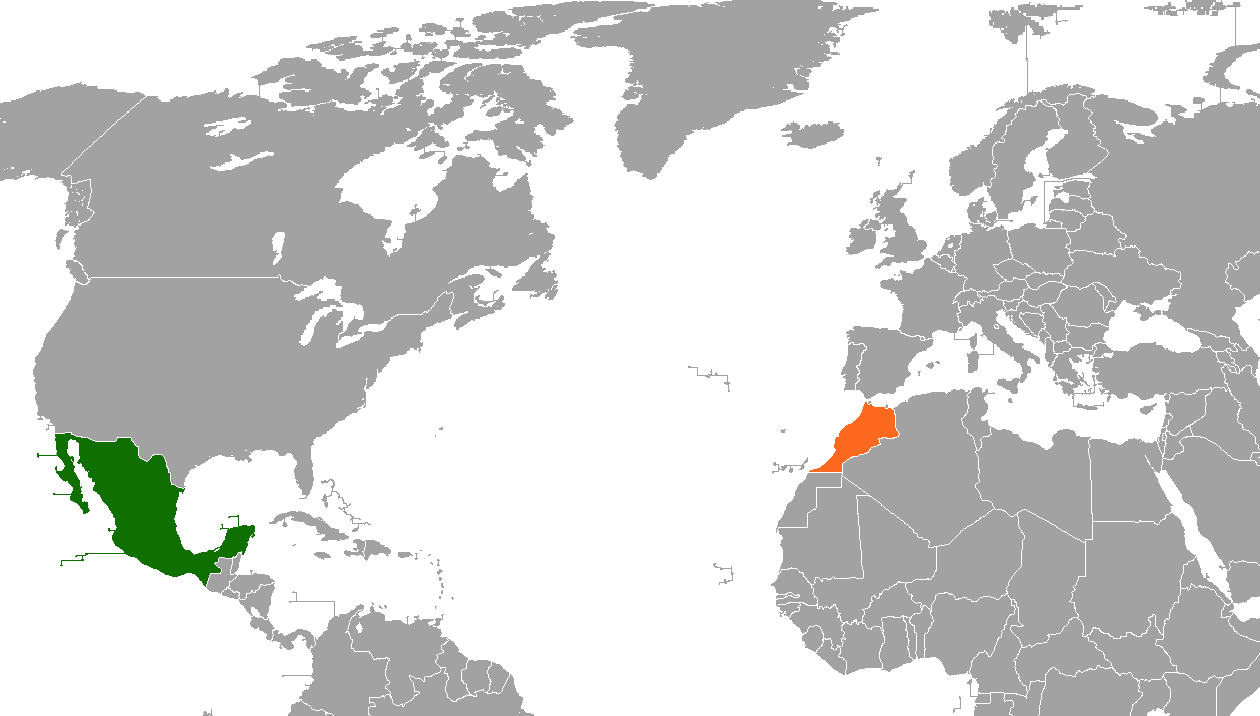

- Mexico: Morocco

The nations of Mexico and Morocco established diplomatic relations in 1962. Both nations are members of the Group of 24 and the United Nations.

== History ==
In April 1956, Morocco obtained its independence from France. In 1961, Mexican President Adolfo López Mateos sent a presidential delegation led by Special Envoy Alejandro Carrillo Marcor and Delegate José Ezequiel Iturriaga to visit Morocco and to work toward the establishment of diplomatic relations. On October 31, 1962, Mexico and Morocco formally established diplomatic relations.

Relations between the two nations initially remained cordial, without any major bilateral agreements taking place. Relations became strained, however, after Mexico recognized the right to self-determination and established diplomatic relations with the government of Western Sahara in 1979.

In 1990, Mexico established an embassy in Rabat which was inaugurated by Mexican Foreign Secretary Fernando Solana. In 1991, Morocco reciprocated the gesture by opening an embassy in Mexico City, which had originally been accredited from Washington, D.C.

In March 2002, Moroccan Prime Minister Abderrahmane Youssoufi attended the Monterrey Conference in the northern Mexican city of Monterrey. In October 2003, King Mohammed VI of Morocco paid a private visit to Mexico. In November 2004, King Mohammed VI paid an official visit to Mexico and in February 2005, Mexican President Vicente Fox made an official visit to Morocco. In January 2009, Moroccan Foreign Minister Taieb Fassi Fihri visited Mexico. In December 2009, Mexican Foreign Secretary, Patricia Espinosa paid a visit to Morocco.

In 2016, an inter-institutional cooperation agreement was signed between Mexico's National Autonomous University (UNAM) and Morocco's Abdelmalek Essaâdi University to promote the exchange of scholars and students, and to conduct joint scientific research. In December 2018, the Mexican Foreign Secretary Marcelo Ebrard visited Morocco to attend the Intergovernmental Conference on the Global Compact for Migration in Marrakesh.

In 2024, both nations celebrated 62 years of diplomatic relations.

== High-level visits ==
High-level visits from Mexico to Morocco

- Special Envoy Alejandro Carrillo Marcor (1961)
- Delegate José Ezequiel Iturriaga (1961)
- Foreign Secretary Fernando Solana (1990)
- Foreign Secretary José Ángel Gurría (1995)
- President Vicente Fox (2005)
- Foreign Secretary Patricia Espinosa (2009)
- Director General for Africa and the Middle East Jorge Álvarez Fuentes (2018)
- Foreign Secretary Marcelo Ebrard (2018)

High-level visits from Morocco to Mexico

- Foreign Minister Abdellatif Filali (1991)
- Prime Minister Abderrahmane Youssoufi (2002)
- King Mohammed VI (2003, 2004)
- Foreign Minister Mohamed Benaissa (2007)
- Foreign Minister Taieb Fassi Fihri (2009)

== Bilateral agreements ==
Both nations have signed several bilateral agreements such as an Agreement on General Cooperation (1991); Agreement for the Abolition of Visas in Diplomatic, Official and Service Passports (1995); Agreement on Educational and Cultural Cooperation (2004); Memorandum of Understanding for the Establishment of a Mechanism of Consultation in Matters of Mutual Interest (2004); Agreement of Diplomatic and Academic Cooperation (2005); Agreement on Hydraulic Resource Cooperation (2005); and an Agreement to Promote Cooperation in the Modernization of Public Administration, Open Government, Transparency and to Combat Corruption (2008).

== Trade ==
In 2023, the two-way trade between both nations amounted to US$653 million. Mexico's main exports to Morocco include: data processing machines, telephones and mobile phones, plants, peppers and dried vegetables; chemical based products, tubes and pipes of iron or steel, tractors, parts and accessories for motor vehicles, beer and other alcoholic beverages. Morocco's main exports to Mexico include: clothing articles, chemical based products, electronic integrated circuits, parts for engines, electrical equipment, parts and accessories for motor vehicles, seeds, fruits and spores for sewing; sugar cane, glass, plastics, minerals and precious stones, and articles of iron or steel.

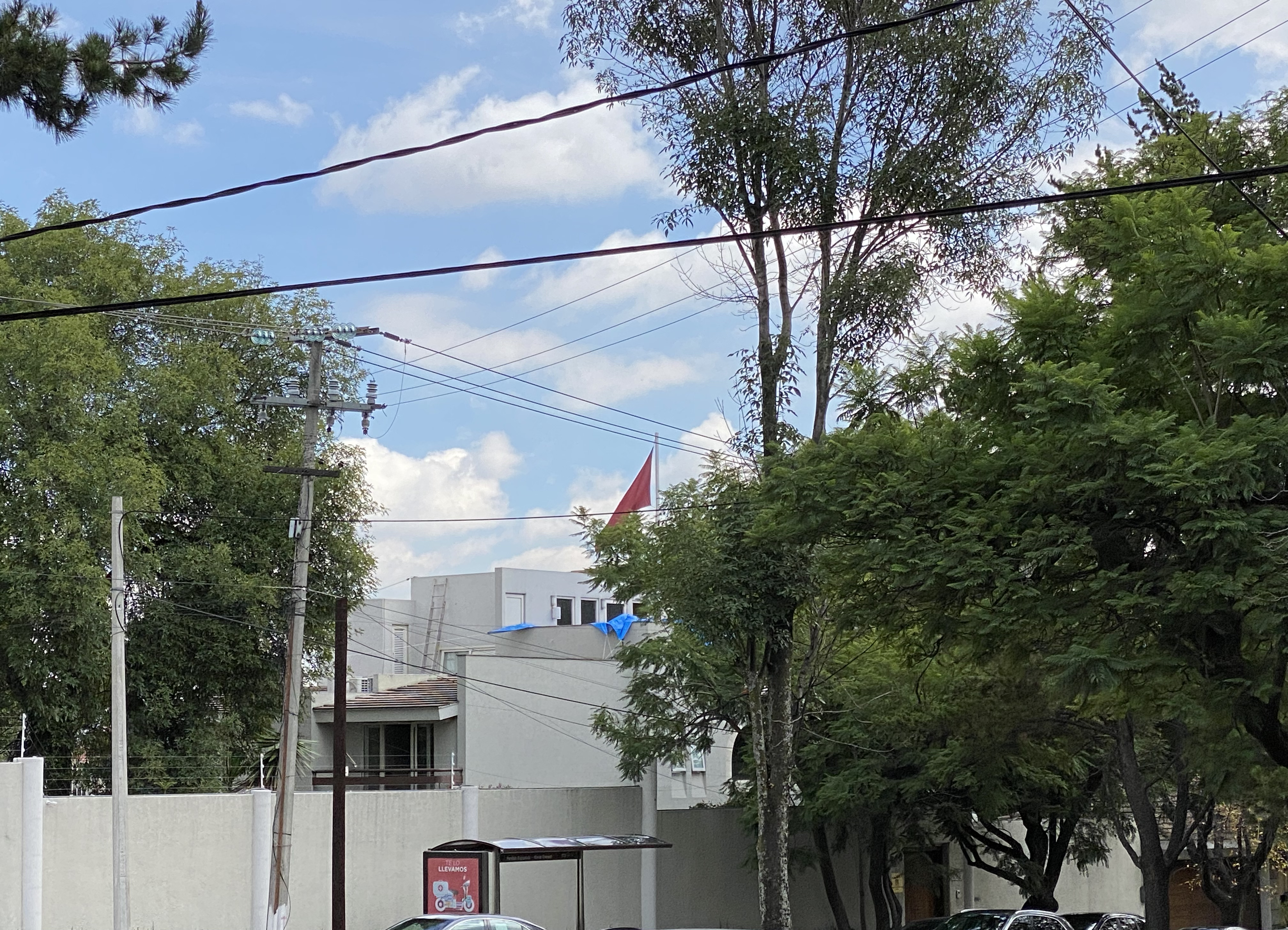
Embassy of Morocco in Mexico City

Mexican multinational companies such as FreshKampo, Grupo Bimbo and Orbia operate in Morocco.

== Resident diplomatic missions ==
- Mexico has an embassy in Rabat.
- Morocco has an embassy in Mexico City.
