= Morocco–Poland relations =

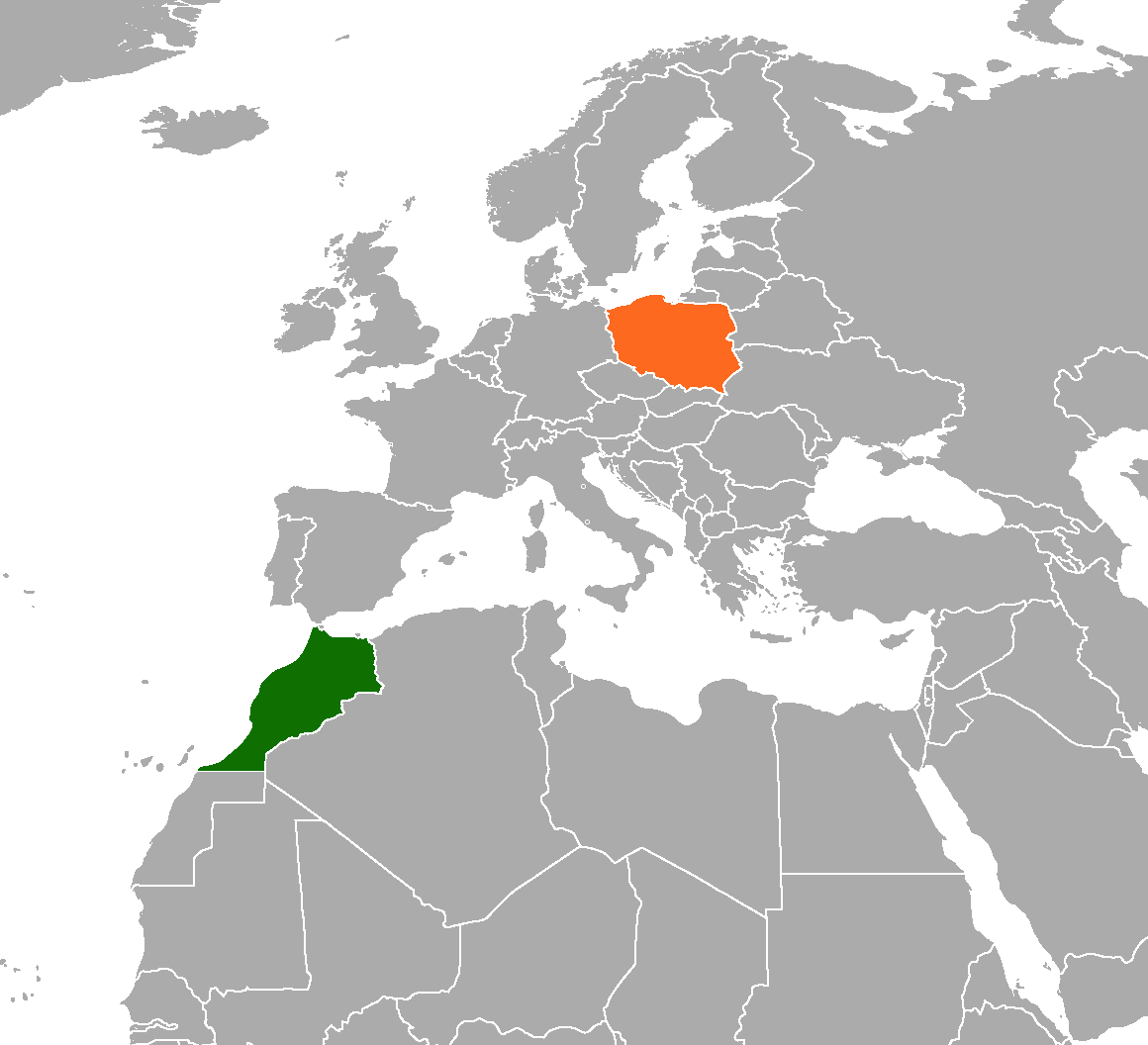
- Morocco: Poland

Morocco–Poland relations are bilateral relations between Morocco and Poland. Both nations are full members of the World Trade Organization, the Union for the Mediterranean and the United Nations.

== History ==
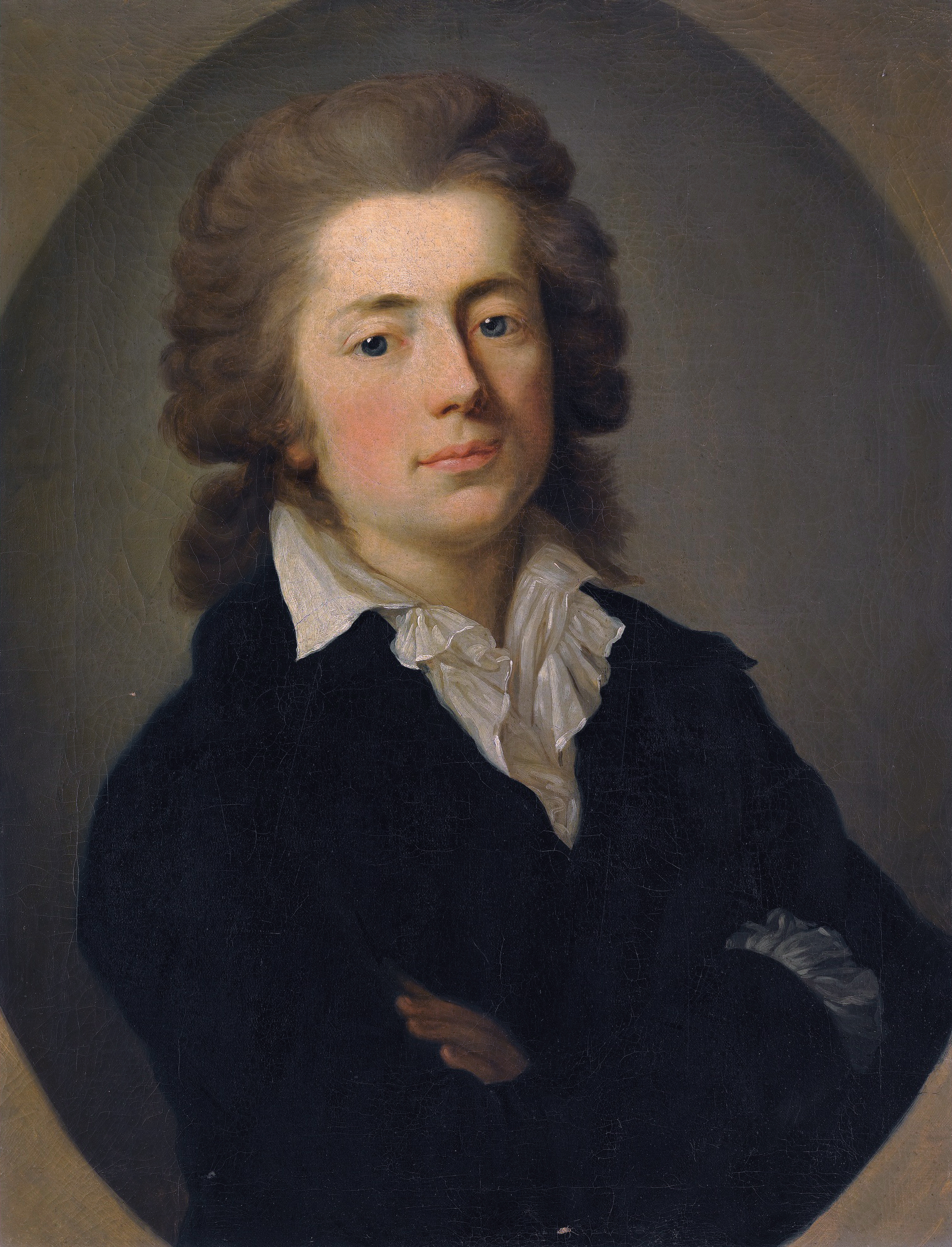
Jan Potocki, considered the first Polish envoy to Morocco

There are several similarities between Morocco and Poland, as both countries were founded in the Middle Ages, both were middle powers in Northwest Africa and Central Europe, respectively, and both, at different times, rose to great power status, yet for centuries there were no official relations given the separating distance. Polish Enlightenment writer and traveller Jan Potocki is considered the first Polish envoy to Morocco. Relations, however, were not developed, as Poland soon lost its independence due to the Partitions of Poland, a fate shared by Morocco in 1912. Following the restoration of independent Poland after World War I, an honorary consulate of Poland was located in Casablanca from 1931 to 1945.

Polish and Moroccan troops both fought against Nazi Germany in World War II. Moroccan prisoners of war were held by the Germans alike Polish and other Allied POWs in the Stalag II-B, Stalag II-D, Stalag VIII-C and Stalag XXI-A POW camps, located in Czarne, Stargard, Żagań and Ostrzeszów, respectively. Both Moroccan and Polish POWs were subjected to poor treatment by the Germans, who regarded them as "racially inferior". Poles and Moroccans were part of the large Allied coalition in the Battle of Monte Cassino of 1944.

Diplomatic relations were established in 1959, following the restoration of Moroccan independence. In 1962–1965, the Polish company CEKOP built Morocco's first sugar refinery in Sidi Slimane. Poles introduced sugar beet cultivation to Morocco and built chemical factories in Morocco. Polish architects designed a number of buildings in Casablanca after World War II.

A cultural cooperation agreement between Morocco and Poland was signed in Rabat in 1969, replaced by a new agreement in 2013. After 1978, some 300 Polish high school teachers and university lecturers were sent to Morocco.

== Modern relations ==
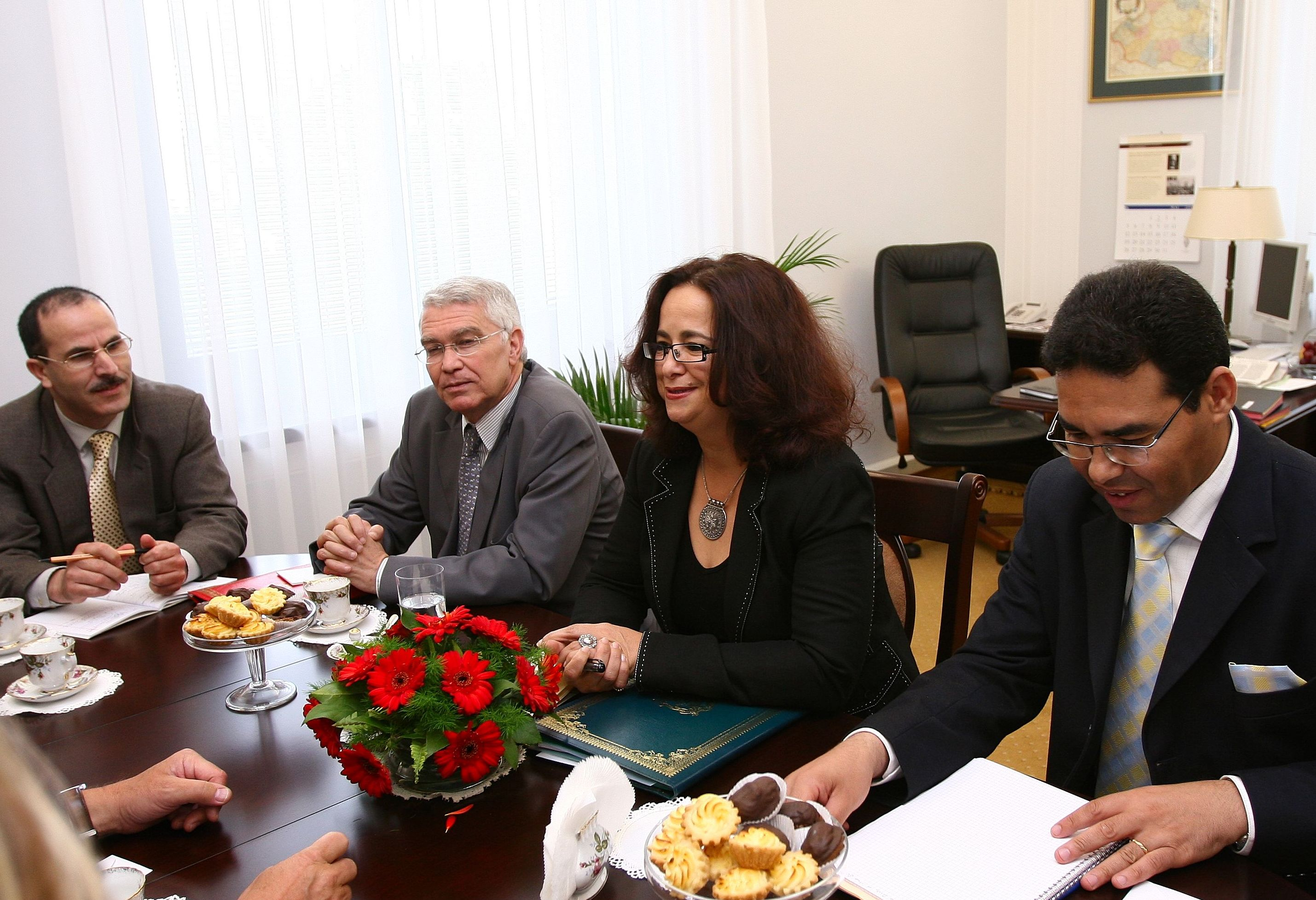
Visit of Secretary of State for Foreign Affairs of Morocco Latifa Akherbach in the Senate of Poland in 2008

In 1994, a double tax avoidance agreement was signed between the two countries in Rabat.

In January 2010, Abbas El Fassi became the first Moroccan Prime Minister to pay an official visit to Poland. In April 2010, Abbas El Fassi attended the state funeral of Lech and Maria Kaczyński in Kraków despite the air travel disruption after the 2010 Eyjafjallajökull eruption.

One of the fields of cooperation between Poland and Morocco is archaeology. In 2022, Poles and Moroccans jointly discovered an ancient Roman observation tower in Volubilis, the first such tower to be discovered in Morocco.

Poland sent two rescue squads to help the relief operation after the 2023 Marrakesh–Safi earthquake in Morocco.

Moroccan students were the 22nd largest group of foreign students in Poland in 2022, the 20th largest in 2023 and the 19th largest in 2024, at the same time being the largest group from North Africa.

== Diplomatic missions ==
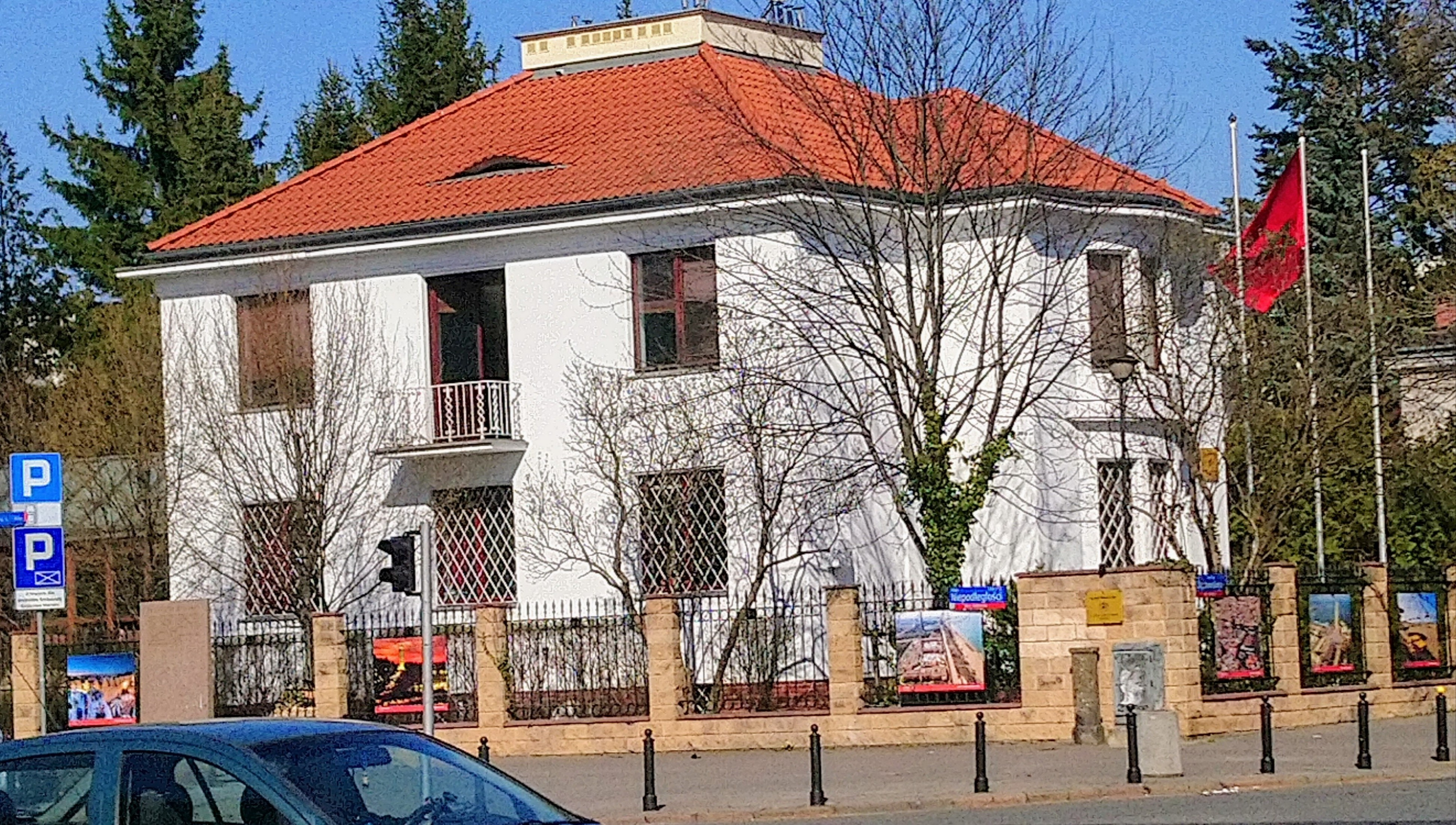
Embassy of Morocco in Warsaw

- Morocco has an embassy in Warsaw and an honorary consulate in Poznań.
- Poland has an embassy in Rabat and an honorary consulate in Marrakesh.

== See also ==
- Foreign relations of Morocco
- Foreign relations of Poland

== Bibliography ==
- Knopek, Jacek (2006). "Stosunki Polski z Afryką Arabską po II wojnie światowej". Forum Politologiczne (in Polish). 3. Instytut Nauk Politycznych Uniwersytetu Warmińsko-Mazurskiego w Olsztynie. ISSN 1734-1698.
