= Morocco–Pakistan relations =

- Morocco: Pakistan

Morocco–Pakistan relations have traditionally been strong and cordial, since their establishment in the 1950s. Morocco maintains an embassy in Islamabad, whilst Pakistan maintains one in Rabat. Both countries are members of the Organisation of Islamic Cooperation, Group of 77 and Non-Aligned Movement.

== History ==
Pakistan’s role in the Independence of Morocco:

In 1952 when Morocco was under French rule and they were fighting for their independence, Sultan Mohammed V of Morocco sent Ahmed Balafrej to US to address UN Security Council. However, French delegates did not allow him to speak saying that because Morocco was a French protectorate therefore, Ahmed Bulferg being subject of France can not speak at the UN forum. At this humiliation of Ahmed Balafrej by French, Pakistan’s Foreign Minister Zafarullah Khan immediately got Pakistani embassy at US opened at night and offered Ahmed Balafrej Pakistani nationality and issued him Pakistani Passport due which on the next day he was able to address the UN Security council as Pakistani citizen in favour of Morocco. This gave great boost to the Moroccan independence movement internationally and back at home

Finally when Morocco became independent in 1956, the Sultan Mohammed appointed Ahmed Balafrej as Prime Minister of Morocco and he used to hang his framed Pakistani Passport in his office and used to proudly tell all the visitors the role that passport played in the independence of Morocco.

== Bilateral relations ==
Both countries have co-operated significantly in the past and continue to widely expand their relations. In the past, Pakistan has said that it does not recognise the self-proclaimed Sahrawi Arab Republic in the Western Sahara, and that the region's status is disputed and remains to be decided by UN Resolutions. It showed its support for the Moroccan point of view that the dispute is an internal matter.

== Economic relations ==
In late 2007, the Moroccan Ambassador, Mohammed Rida El Fassi, invited and encouraged Pakistani entrepreneurs and businessmen to take advantage of Morocco's Free Trade Agreement (FTA) with the US and the European Union (EU), particularly in the textile and readymade garments. In a meeting with the Vice-President of the Federation of Pakistan Chambers of Commerce & Industry (FPCCI), Zubair Tufail, the ambassador said that under the FTA, Morocco has free access of readymade garments to the United States, a huge market for garments. “Morocco is a big exporter of readymade garments to Europe, and we invite Pakistani companies to share the Moroccan export to Europe,” Fassi said. The ambassador went on to invite Pakistani companies to set up garment units in Morocco, where even a 30% value addition is acceptable to the European Union.

The Vice-President of FPCCI, Zubair Tufail, accepted and welcomed the Ambassador's offer in return and stressed that the private sector of both the countries will come closer to open new possibilities for bilateral trade. Currently, Pakistan's exports to Morocco stand at US$11.5 million, whilst Moroccan exports to Pakistan stand at US$147 million.

== Resident diplomatic missions ==
- Morocco has an embassy in Islamabad.
- Pakistan has an embassy in Rabat.

== See also ==
- Foreign relations of Morocco
- Foreign relations of Pakistan
