= Africa–Canada relations =

- AU: Canada

Africa

Canada

Canada maintains diplomatic and economic relations with the peoples and countries of the African continent.

Although Canada had little contact with the continent prior to the twentieth century, following decolonization in Africa, Canada became one of the few major industrialized Western countries to have good relations with the newly independent countries. In the decades since, Canadian companies play a major role in the African mining and resource development sectors, and the Canadian government has been a provider of foreign aid.

== History ==
=== Early years ===
Contact between Canada and the African continent before the twentieth century was fleeting. A small number of Africans were taken as slaves to Canada during the Atlantic slave trade. However slavery in Canada was not a major part of the economy or social system, either under French (1534–1763) or British rule. A few Christian missionaries from Canada may have visited Africa. Canada and Africa were both part of a global trading system, linked by European trading companies such as the Hudson's Bay Company and the Royal African Company. However, as both Canada and African were raw-material exporting areas, they mostly traded with manufacturers in Europe, and not with each other.

Canadians first became involved with African politics because of British imperial wars there. A group of 386 Canadian voyageurs participated in the 1884-1885 Nile Expedition during the Mahdist War in Sudan. A larger Canadian contingent took part in the Second Boer War (1899–1902), helping to keep South Africa within the British Empire.

Canadian writer Margaret Laurence lived in British Somaliland then the Gold Coast British colony in the 1950s. African folk culture and colonial relations informed her work, and after her return to Canada she became a leading figure in Canadian literature.

=== After African independence ===
Following the era of Decolonization in Africa, Canada was one of the few major industrialized Western countries that had good initial relations with most independent countries. This was because of several important Canadian characteristics shared with African countries, according to a 2004 briefing note by the Canadian Council on Africa. Canada's two official languages, English and French are two of the most widely spoken in Africa. Canada's official multiculturalism (after 1971) and growing African-Canadian community have also helped relations. Canada uses both the English common law system and French civil code (Province of Quebec only) that are used in much of Africa. Canada is the only G8 country that never possessed any overseas colonies, thus Canadians do not carry any imperial baggage in Africa". Canada shares many geographic similarities to many African countries in that the latter are large, sparsely populated wild areas with few major cities and face major challenges with the delivery of government services, much like Canada at the beginning of the 20th century. Both Canada and most African countries rely on natural resource development and international trade for economic growth. Canadian companies also play a major part in the mining and resource development sector in Africa, with over $3.5 billion in capital invested on the continent. This makes it the single largest foreign investor in resource development. Canada is also a member of both the Commonwealth and La Francophonie, which together include most countries in Africa.

During the 1990s, Canadian involvement in African dropped as the result of government cutbacks to the aid and foreign affairs budgets. This was largely reversed during the short government of Paul Martin, whose government announced several new commitments to Africa. During this period, Canada grew to become the 3rd largest foreign donor in Africa, with numerous humanitarian development projects spanning many countries. The majority of these projects were administered by the Canadian International Development Agency, with funding provided by the Department of Foreign Affairs and International Trade. However, relations have deteriorated under the government of Stephen Harper, which is cited as one of the reasons Canada failed to win a seat on the UN Security Council in 2010. That same year the Canadian government also suspended all aid to Africa, a sharp shift from its position as a key humanitarian donor and development partner in Africa.

In 2025, Canada began its Africa Strategy, which it describes as aimed at promoting "economic prosperity, security, and fairness" for Canadians and Africans.

== Canada's foreign relations with African countries ==
- Algeria
- Angola
- Benin
- Botswana
- Burkina Faso
- Burundi
- Cameroon
- Cape Verde
- Central African Republic
- Chad
- Comoros
- (Democratic Republic of the Congo) Congo-Kinshasa
- (Republic of the Congo) Congo-Brazzaville
- Djibouti
- Egypt
- Equatorial Guinea
- Eritrea
- Eswatini
- Ethiopia
- Gabon
- (The Gambia) Gambia
- Ghana
- Guinea
- Guinea-Bissau
- Ivory Coast
- Kenya
- Lesotho
- Liberia
- Libya
- Madagascar
- Malawi
- Mali
- Mauritania
- Mauritius
- Morocco
- Mozambique
- Namibia
- Niger
- Nigeria
- Rwanda
- São Tomé and Príncipe
- Senegal
- Seychelles
- Sierra Leone
- Somalia
- South Africa
- South Sudan
- Sudan
- Tanzania
- Togo
- Tunisia
- Uganda
- Zambia
- Zimbabwe

== See also ==
- Foreign relations of Canada

== Bibliography ==
- Engler, Yves (2015). Canada in Africa: 300 Years of Aid and Exploitation. Vancouver: Fernwood Publishing. ISBN 9781552667620..
