= Moroccan Canadians =

Part of the Moroccan diaspora

Moroccan Canadians Canadiens d'origine marocaine (French)
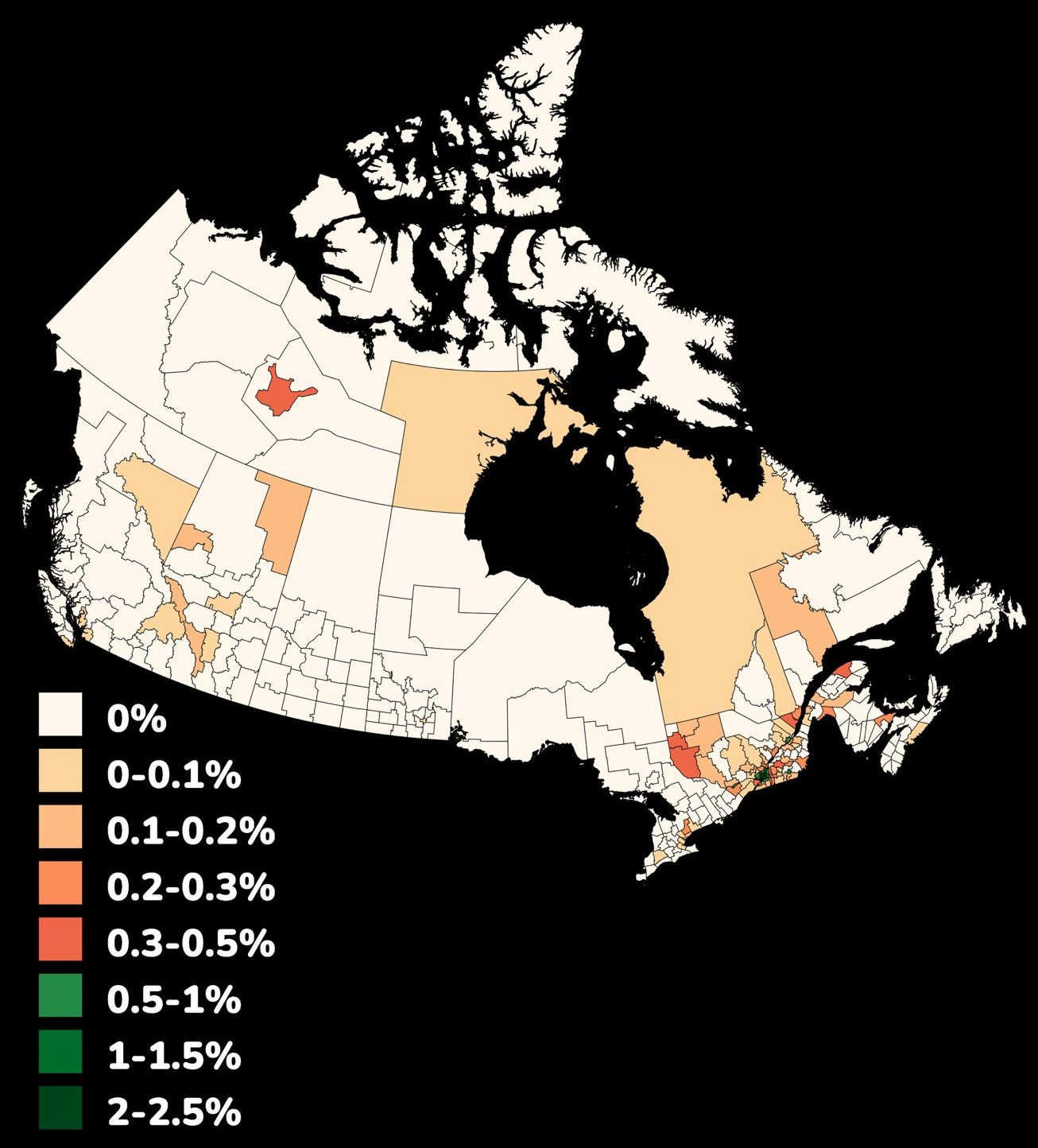
- Population distribution of Moroccan Canadians by census division, 2021 census

Total population
- 99,980 (by ancestry, 2021 Census)

Regions with significant populations
- Quebec: 81,230
- Ontario: 12,300

Languages
- Arabic (Moroccan Arabic), Berber, French English

Religion
- Islam, Judaism, Irreligion, Christianity (Note: Religious breakdown proportions based on "Moroccan" ethnic or cultural origin response on the 2021 census.)

Moroccan Canadians (Arabic: المغاربة في كندا, romanized: al-Maghāribah fī Kanadā) are Canadians of full or partial Moroccan descent, as well as people from the state of Morocco who are ethno-linguistic and religious minorities. According to the 2021 Census, there were 99,980 Canadians who claimed full or partial Moroccan ancestry.

== History ==
Moroccans began arriving in Canada in the mid-1960s in search of employment and a new life. Between 1962 and 1993, 40,000 settled in Canada.

The next wave came in the late 1990s. Moroccan immigrants settled mainly in the province of Quebec, but there are also communities in Toronto, Vancouver, Ottawa and Winnipeg.

At the 2001 Canadian Census, there were 21,355 Canadians who indicated Moroccan descent, with over 16,000, about 75% of the total population, residing in Montreal.

== Demography ==
=== Religion ===
The majority of Moroccan Canadians are Muslims and a large minority are Jews. Jews constitute between 27% and 45% of Moroccan Canadians.

Moroccan Canadian demography by religion
Religious group	2021		2001 (Note: Religious breakdown proportions based on "Moroccan" ethnic or cultural origin response on the 2001 census.)	
Religious group	Pop.	%	Pop.	%
Islam	68,925	68.94%	12,810	59.97%
Judaism	15,300	15.3%	5,735	26.85%
Irreligion	12,815	12.82%	1,685	7.89%
Christianity	2,735	2.74%	1,100	5.15%
Buddhism	30	0.03%	0	0%
Hinduism	0	0%	10	0.05%
Other	170	0.17%	25	0.12%
Total Moroccan Canadian population	99,980	100%	21,360	100%

== Notable people ==
- Aldo Bensadoun, is a Canadian businessman, investor and philanthropist. He is the founder and executive chairman of the Aldo Group, a worldwide retail shoe company.
- Gad Elmaleh, is a Moroccan Canadian stand-up comedian actor and artist.
- Fatima Houda-Pepin is a Canadian Quebec politician and a former member of the National Assembly of Quebec, Canada.
- La Zarra, singer
- Hicham Bennir is a Canadian and Moroccan film director, cinematographer, editor, producer, writer and photographer. He was the winner of the world photo contest in 2009 and 2010.
- Rachid Badouri, comedian.
- Yassine Bounou, Moroccan footballer.
- Soufiane Chakkouche, writer and journalist
- Emmanuelle Chriqui, actress (Entourage, You Don't Mess with the Zohan).
- A-Trak, is a Canadian DJ, turntablist, record producer.
- Nadia Essadiqi, actress and singer.
- Adam Lamhamedi, Moroccan Canadian alpine skier; competed for Morocco at the 2014 Winter Olympics.
- Vaï, Moroccan-French Canadian rapper.
- Nora Fatehi, Bollywood actress and dancer.
- Imane Anys, better known as Pokimane, is a Twitch streamer and YouTuber.
- Faouzia, Moroccan Canadian singer.
- Hicham Nostik, Moroccan writer, YouTuber and podcaster.

== See also ==
- Algerian Canadians
- Tunisian Canadians
- Middle Eastern Canadians
- Canada-Morocco relations
- Arab Canadians
- Berber Canadians
