= Middle Eastern Canadians =

Canadians of Middle Eastern ancestry

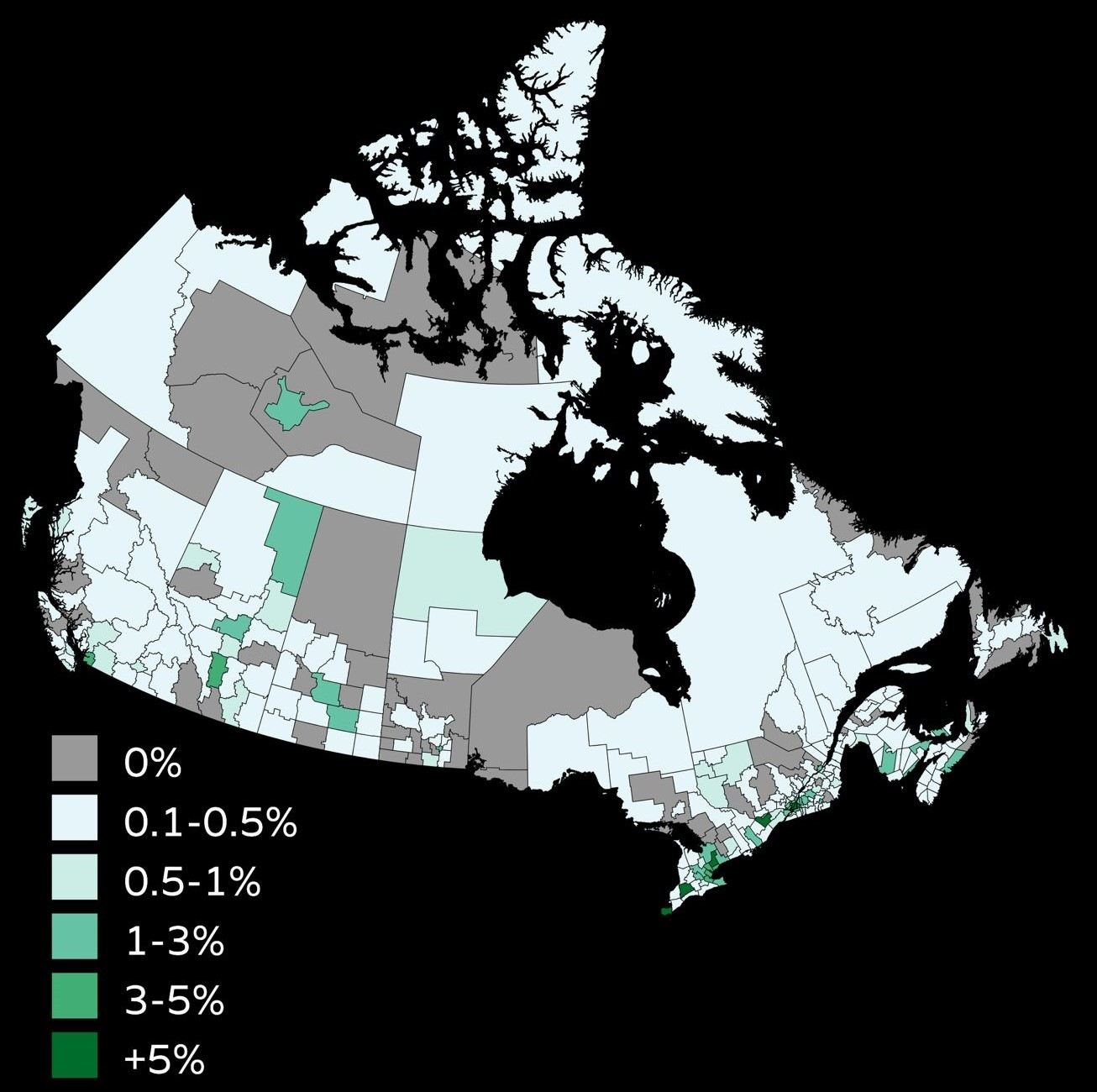
- Population distribution of Middle Eastern Canadians by census division, 2021 census

Total population
- 1,690,015; 4.7% of the total Canadian population (2021)

Regions with significant populations
- Southern Ontario, Southern Quebec, Southwestern BC, Central Alberta

Languages
- Canadian English · Canadian French · Arabic · Persian · Armenian · Turkish · Hebrew; Other Middle Eastern languages

Religion
- Islam (51.2%); Christianity (25.3%); Irreligion (18.5%); Judaism (3.1%); Others (1.9%)

Related ethnic groups
- Middle Eastern Americans · Arab Canadians · West Asian Canadians · Asian Canadians

Middle Eastern Canadians are Canadians who were either born in or can trace their ancestry to the Middle East (MENA region), which includes both West Asia and North Africa.

== History ==
Middle Eastern Canadian; Population History
Year	Pop.	±%
2011	1,036,175	—
2016	1,364,560	+31.7%
2021	1,690,015	+23.9%
Source: Statistics Canada

=== Initial settlement ===
Individuals from the Middle East first arrived in Canada in 1882, when a group of Syrian-Lebanese immigrants settled in Montreal. These early Arab immigrants were mostly Christian and arrived primarily from the Levant (modern-day Israel, Lebanon, Syria, Palestine, and Jordan).

In 1901, approximately 2,000 immigrants from Greater Syria, encompassing modern-day Syria, Lebanon, Jordan, Israel, and Palestine, settled in Canada.

=== 20th century ===
During World War I, Middle Eastern Canadians of Turkish origin were placed in "enemy alien" internment camps.

The Middle Eastern Canadian population grew rapidly during the latter half of the 20th century; the 1979 Iranian Revolution resulted in a spike of immigration to Canada from the West Asian country.

=== 21st century ===
The Syrian refugee crisis during the 2010s fueled further growth to the already existing Syrian population; increased immigration from the West Asian country resulted in Syria becoming the third highest source country of immigration to Canada adding 35,000 Syrians becoming permanent residents in 2016.

== Demography ==
=== Ethnic and national origins ===
Middle Eastern Canadians Demography by Ethnic and National Origins (2011−2021)
Ethnic/National Origins	Origins Region	2021		2016		2011	
Ethnic/National Origins	Origins Region	Pop.	%	Pop.	%	Pop.	%
Arab, n.o.s.	West Asia	263,710	15.6%	111,405	8.16%	94,640	9.13%
Lebanese	West Asia	210,605	12.46%	219,555	16.09%	190,275	18.36%
Iranian	West Asia	200,465	11.86%	210,405	15.42%	163,290	15.76%
Egyptian	North Africa	105,245	6.23%	99,140	7.27%	73,250	7.07%
Moroccan	North Africa	99,980	5.92%	103,945	7.62%	71,910	6.94%
Syrian	West Asia	98,250	5.81%	77,045	5.65%	40,840	3.94%
Persian	West Asia	80,340	4.75%	—N/a	—N/a	—N/a	—N/a
Turkish	West Asia	76,745	4.54%	63,955	4.69%	55,430	5.35%
Algerian	North Africa	73,770	4.37%	67,335	4.93%	49,110	4.74%
Armenian	West Asia	68,850	4.07%	63,810	4.68%	55,740	5.38%
Iraqi	West Asia	59,300	3.51%	70,920	5.2%	49,680	4.79%
Palestinian	West Asia	45,905	2.72%	44,820	3.28%	31,245	3.02%
Berber	North Africa	41,700	2.47%	37,065	2.72%	25,885	2.5%
Israeli	West Asia	35,345	2.09%	28,735	2.11%	15,010	1.45%
Tunisian	North Africa	30,465	1.8%	25,650	1.88%	15,125	1.46%
Kurdish	West Asia	23,130	1.37%	16,315	1.2%	11,685	1.13%
Coptic	North Africa	22,570	1.34%	3,535	0.26%	3,570	0.34%
Kabyle	North Africa	20,565	1.22%	—N/a	—N/a	—N/a	—N/a
Assyrian	West Asia	19,685	1.16%	13,830	1.01%	10,810	1.04%
Sudanese	North Africa	17,485	1.03%	19,965	1.46%	16,595	1.6%
North African, n.o.s.	North Africa	16,315	0.97%	—N/a	—N/a	—N/a	—N/a
Jordanian	West Asia	13,225	0.78%	14,250	1.04%	9,425	0.91%
Chaldean	West Asia	12,115	0.72%	—N/a	—N/a	—N/a	—N/a
Azerbaijani	West Asia	9,915	0.59%	6,425	0.47%	4,580	0.44%
Yemeni	West Asia	8,115	0.48%	6,645	0.49%	3,945	0.38%
Libyan	North Africa	7,945	0.47%	7,740	0.57%	5,515	0.53%
West Asian origins, n.i.e.	West Asia	7,645	0.45%	25,280	1.85%	16,540	1.6%
Georgian	West Asia	5,850	0.35%	4,775	0.35%	3,155	0.3%
Cypriot	West Asia	4,830	0.29%	5,655	0.41%	4,815	0.46%
Saudi Arabian	West Asia	3,935	0.23%	6,810	0.5%	7,955	0.77%
Kuwaiti	West Asia	2,375	0.14%	2,240	0.16%	2,240	0.22%
Circassian	West Asia	1,390	0.08%	—N/a	—N/a	—N/a	—N/a
Yazidi	West Asia	1,140	0.07%	—N/a	—N/a	—N/a	—N/a
Omani	West Asia	660	0.04%	—N/a	—N/a	—N/a	—N/a
North African origins, n.i.e.	North Africa	450	0.03%	6,115	0.45%	2,875	0.28%
Maure	North Africa	—N/a	—N/a	1,195	0.09%	1,040	0.1%
West Asian origins	West Asia	1,253,525	74.17%	992,875	72.76%	771,300	74.44%
North African origins	North Africa	436,490	25.83%	371,685	27.24%	264,875	25.56%
Middle Eastern Canadian Population	Total	1,690,015	100%	1,364,560	100%	1,036,175	100%

=== Language ===
The vast majority of Middle Eastern Canadians speak West Asian and North African languages as a mother tongue or second language. The top five Middle Eastern languages spoken in Canada include Arabic, Persian, Hebrew, Turkish, and Armenian.

Knowledge of Middle Eastern languages in Canada (2001−2021)
Language	2021		2016		2011		2006		2001	
Language	Pop.	%	Pop.	%	Pop.	%	Pop.	%	Pop.	%
Arabic	838,045	55.97%	629,055	55.62%	470,965	54.94%	365,085	53.77%	290,280	53.93%
Persian	326,285	21.79%	252,320	22.31%	196,110	22.88%	154,385	22.74%	111,705	20.75%
Hebrew	83,205	5.56%	75,020	6.63%	70,695	8.25%	67,390	9.93%	63,670	11.83%
Turkish	78,500	5.24%	50,775	4.49%	44,080	5.14%	36,935	5.44%	32,520	6.04%
Armenian	44,500	2.97%	41,295	3.65%	36,235	4.23%	35,260	5.19%	32,905	6.11%
Berber	42,835	2.86%	29,460	2.61%	7,430	0.87%	2,235	0.33%	—N/a	—N/a
Aramaic	39,660	2.65%	26,860	2.38%	—N/a	—N/a	—N/a	—N/a	—N/a	—N/a
Kurdish	24,035	1.61%	15,290	1.35%	11,815	1.38%	9,185	1.35%	7,145	1.33%
Azerbaijani	9,870	0.66%	5,450	0.48%	—N/a	—N/a	2,455	0.36%	—N/a	—N/a
Coptic	3,690	0.25%	—N/a	—N/a	—N/a	—N/a	—N/a	—N/a	—N/a	—N/a
Georgian	3,010	0.2%	2,150	0.19%	—N/a	—N/a	—N/a	—N/a	—N/a	—N/a
Iranian languages, n.i.e.	1,830	0.12%	—N/a	—N/a	—N/a	—N/a	—N/a	—N/a	—N/a	—N/a
Semitic languages, n.i.e.	1,760	0.12%	3,220	0.28%	19,975	2.33%	6,035	0.89%	—N/a	—N/a
Total	1,497,225	100%	1,130,895	100%	857,305	100%	678,965	100%	538,225	100%

=== Religion ===
Religious affiliation amongst Middle Eastern Canadians (2021)
1. Islam (51.2%)
2. Christianity (25.3%)
3. Irreligion (18.5%)
4. Judaism (3.07%)
5. Other religions (1.94%)

Islam, Christianity, and Judaism are the dominant religions among the Middle Eastern Canadian population.

Religious affiliation amongst Middle Eastern Canadians (2021)
Ethnic/National Origins	Islam		Christianity		Irreligion		Judaism		Others		Total	
Ethnic/National Origins	Pop.	%	Pop.	%	Pop.	%	Pop.	%	Pop.	%	Pop.	%
Arab, n.o.s.	212,610	80.62%	30,145	11.43%	18,755	7.11%	270	0.1%	—N/a	—N/a	263,710	15.6%
Lebanese	63,255	30.03%	104,945	49.83%	36,465	17.31%	785	0.37%	—N/a	—N/a	210,605	12.46%
Iranian	89,940	44.87%	12,435	6.2%	85,705	42.75%	870	0.43%	—N/a	—N/a	200,465	11.86%
Egyptian	40,495	38.48%	51,525	48.96%	11,260	10.7%	1,600	1.52%	—N/a	—N/a	105,245	6.23%
Moroccan	68,925	68.94%	2,735	2.74%	12,815	12.82%	15,300	15.3%	—N/a	—N/a	99,980	5.92%
Syrian	47,895	48.75%	39,115	39.81%	9,365	9.53%	595	0.61%	—N/a	—N/a	98,250	5.81%
Persian	33,105	41.21%	5,835	7.26%	34,545	43%	365	0.45%	—N/a	—N/a	80,340	4.75%
Turkish	42,300	55.12%	9,070	11.82%	23,075	30.07%	1,465	1.91%	—N/a	—N/a	76,745	4.54%
Algerian	59,485	80.64%	2,110	2.86%	11,395	15.45%	525	0.71%	—N/a	—N/a	73,770	4.37%
Armenian	710	1.03%	56,290	81.76%	11,145	16.19%	430	0.62%	—N/a	—N/a	68,850	4.07%
Iraqi	27,445	46.28%	24,270	40.93%	4,625	7.8%	2,085	3.52%	—N/a	—N/a	59,300	3.51%
Palestinian	32,895	71.66%	8,605	18.75%	4,155	9.05%	110	0.24%	—N/a	—N/a	45,905	2.72%
Berber	32,490	77.91%	765	1.83%	8,180	19.62%	130	0.31%	—N/a	—N/a	41,700	2.47%
Israeli	205	0.58%	3,345	9.46%	7,805	22.08%	23,730	67.14%	—N/a	—N/a	35,345	2.09%
Tunisian	23,715	77.84%	810	2.66%	5,125	16.82%	760	2.49%	—N/a	—N/a	30,465	1.8%
Kurdish	15,010	64.89%	995	4.3%	6,605	28.56%	45	0.19%	—N/a	—N/a	23,130	1.37%
Coptic	175	0.78%	22,210	98.4%	155	0.69%	30	0.13%	—N/a	—N/a	22,570	1.34%
Kabyle	15,385	74.81%	575	2.8%	4,515	21.95%	0	0%	—N/a	—N/a	20,565	1.22%
Assyrian	75	0.38%	18,835	95.68%	670	3.4%	25	0.13%	—N/a	—N/a	19,685	1.16%
Sudanese	11,345	64.88%	4,880	27.91%	1,190	6.81%	10	0.06%	—N/a	—N/a	17,485	1.03%
North African, n.o.s.	11,655	71.44%	990	6.07%	2,735	16.76%	870	5.33%	—N/a	—N/a	16,315	0.97%
Jordanian	9,500	71.83%	2,590	19.58%	1,075	8.13%	15	0.11%	—N/a	—N/a	13,225	0.78%
Chaldean	70	0.58%	11,885	98.1%	160	1.32%	0	0%	—N/a	—N/a	12,115	0.72%
Azerbaijani	3,765	37.97%	940	9.48%	4,400	44.38%	470	4.74%	—N/a	—N/a	9,915	0.59%
Yemeni	6,800	83.8%	155	1.91%	545	6.72%	575	7.09%	—N/a	—N/a	8,115	0.48%
Libyan	7,075	89.05%	160	2.01%	485	6.1%	205	2.58%	—N/a	—N/a	7,945	0.47%
West Asian origins, n.i.e.	1,755	22.96%	3,465	45.32%	1,655	21.65%	125	1.64%	—N/a	—N/a	7,645	0.45%
Georgian	195	3.33%	3,580	61.2%	1,610	27.52%	380	6.5%	—N/a	—N/a	5,850	0.35%
Cypriot	290	6%	3,590	74.33%	920	19.05%	10	0.21%	—N/a	—N/a	4,830	0.29%
Saudi Arabian	3,125	79.42%	180	4.57%	595	15.12%	0	0%	—N/a	—N/a	3,935	0.23%
Kuwaiti	1,925	81.05%	170	7.16%	265	11.16%	0	0%	—N/a	—N/a	2,375	0.14%
Circassian	880	63.31%	140	10.07%	350	25.18%	0	0%	—N/a	—N/a	1,390	0.08%
Yazidi	30	2.63%	35	3.07%	0	0%	35	3.07%	—N/a	—N/a	1,140	0.07%
Omani	555	84.09%	20	3.03%	75	11.36%	0	0%	—N/a	—N/a	660	0.04%
North African origins, n.i.e.	280	62.22%	130	28.89%	40	8.89%	0	0%	—N/a	—N/a	450	0.03%
Total Middle Eastern Canadian Population	865,360	51.2%	427,525	25.3%	312,460	18.49%	51,815	3.07%	32,855	1.94%	1,690,015	100%

== Geographical distribution ==
Middle Eastern population by province or territory (2016)
Province / territory	Population	Percentage
Ontario	610,005	4.6%
Quebec	465,920	5.8%
Alberta	120,590	3%
British Columbia	109,400	2.4%
Nova Scotia	19,235	2.1%
Manitoba	15,540	1.3%
Saskatchewan	11,605	1.1%
New Brunswick	8,035	1.1%
Newfoundland and Labrador	3,290	0.6%
Prince Edward Island	1,830	1.3%
Northwest Territories	390	0.9%
Yukon	230	0.7%
Nunavut	130	0.4%
Canada	1,366,190	4%

== See also ==
- Armenian Canadians
- Algerian Canadians
- Assyrian Canadians
- Berber Canadians
- Coptic Canadians
- Egyptian Canadians
- Iranian Canadians
- Iraqi Canadians
- Israeli Canadians
- Kurdish Canadians
- Lebanese Canadians
- Libyan Canadians
- Moroccan Canadians
- Palestinian Canadians
- Syrian Canadians
- Turkish Canadians
- Tunisian Canadians
