= Tunisian Canadians =

Total population
- 30,465 (2021 Canada Census)

Regions with significant populations
- Quebec: 26,015
- Ontario: 2,430

Languages
- Arabic (Tunisian Arabic), French, English

Religion
- Islam

Tunisian Canadians (Arabic: التونسيون الكنديون) are Canadians of Tunisian descent or Tunisians who have Canadian citizenship.

Most Tunisian Canadians speak Arabic, French or English. According to the 2016 Census there were 25,645 Canadians who claimed Tunisian ancestry.

== See also ==
- Moroccan Canadians
- Algerian Canadians
- Canada–Tunisia relations
- Arab Canadians
- Berber Canadians
- Tunisian Americans
