= Algerian Canadians =

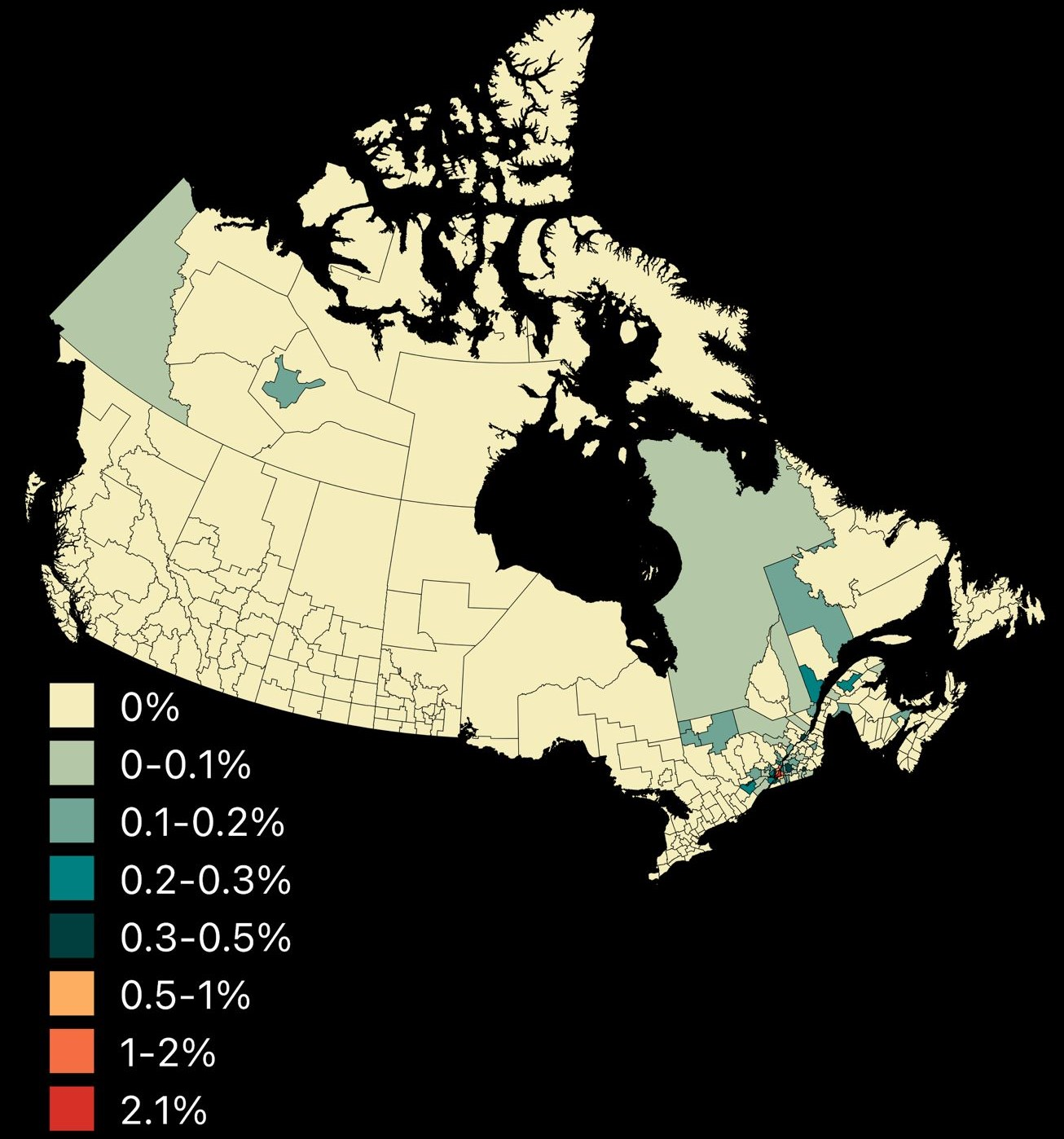
- Population distribution of Algerian Canadians by census division, 2021 census

Total population
- 73,770 (by ancestry, 2021 Census)

Regions with significant populations
- Quebec: 65,860
- Ontario: 4,970

Languages
- Arabic (Algerian Arabic), Berber languages, English and French

Religion
- Islam, Christianity, Judaism, Irreligion

Algerian Canadians (Arabic: كنديون جزائريون) are Canadian citizens of Algerian ancestry or Algeria-born people residing in Canada, as well as people from the state of Algeria who are ethno-linguistic and religious minorities. According to the 2011 Census there were 49,110 Canadians who claimed full or partial Algerian ancestry. Canada is home to the largest Algerian community in North America, as well as the second largest (after France) regarding the Algerian diaspora.

Between 2004 and 2013, 42,252 permanent residents moved to Canada from Algeria.

== Religion ==
Algerian Canadian demography by religion
Religious group	2021 (Note: Religious breakdown proportions based on "Algerian" ethnic or cultural origin response on the 2021 census.)		2001 (Note: Religious breakdown proportions based on "Algerian" ethnic or cultural origin response on the 2001 census.)	
Religious group	Pop.	%	Pop.	%
Christianity	2,100	2.85%	1,080	6.97%
Islam	59,485	80.64%	12,765	82.38%
Irreligion	11,395	15.45%	1,460	9.42%
Judaism	525	0.71%	150	1.03%
Buddhism	20	0.03%	0	0%
Other	245	0.33%	30	0.19%
Total Algerian Canadian population	73,770	100%	15,495	100%

== Notable Algerian Canadians ==
- Rabah Aït Ouyahia, actor
- Zakaria Bahous, professional soccer player
- Mohamed Farsi, professional soccer player
- Boualem Khouider, climate scientist
- Zachary Lagha, ice dancer
- Lynda Thalie, singer-songwriter
- Zaho, singer

== See also ==
- Moroccan Canadians
- Tunisian Canadians
- Arab Canadians
- Berber Canadians
- Algeria–Canada relations
- Middle Eastern Canadians
