= Canada–Ethiopia relations =

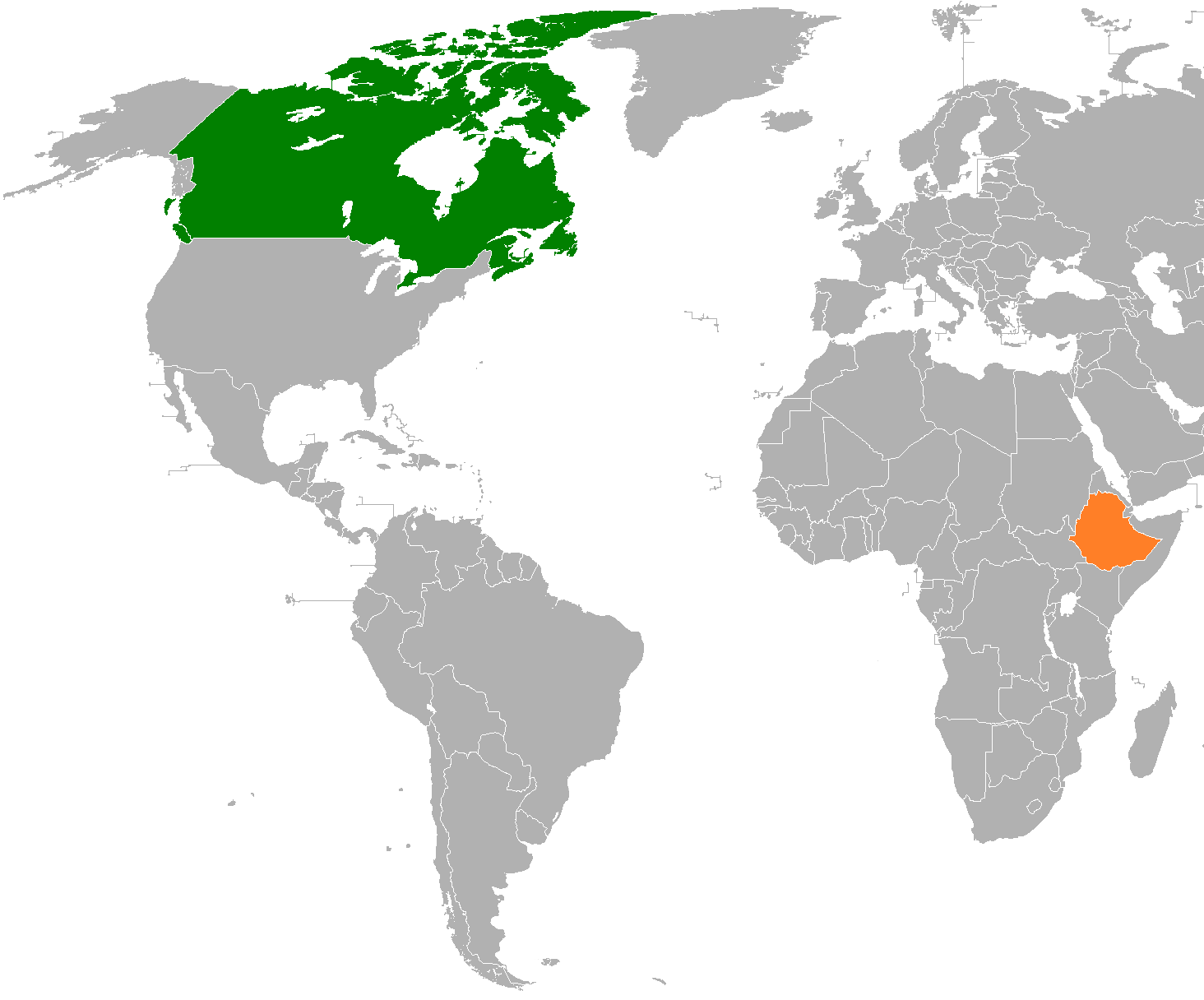

- Canada: Ethiopia

Canada and Ethiopia established diplomatic relations on 13 October 1965. Canada opened an embassy in Addis Ababa in 1966; although Ethiopia opened an embassy in Ottawa in 1968, it was closed in 1970 due to financial constraints and not re-opened until 1989. In 2010, Ethiopia closed its embassy in Ottawa again due to reshuffling and reorganization. On 1 November 2013, Ethiopia reopened its embassy in Ottawa.

== Visits ==
The Canadian Prime Minister, Jean Chrétien made a visit to Ethiopia in 2002. The Vice Minister of the Ministry of Transport and Communication Ayenew Bitewilign visited Canada in 1995, while the President of the Ethiopian Supreme Court Kemal Bedri made a formal visit to that country in 2001.

== Canadian aid ==
Ethiopia was one of 18 countries, in addition to the West Bank and Caribbean nations, which the Canadian government announced would be preferred in receiving foreign aid in 2009, down from 25 previous years. This was down in hope of focussing resources in order to make a larger impact in these countries.

Canada is a significant donor of foreign aid to Ethiopia. Canada's official development assistance in 2007 to Ethiopia totalled US$90.52 million, making it fourth in bilateral donors.

In 2001, Canada sent 450 peacekeepers to the border region as part of a UN force with a mandate to prepare for UN peacekeeping mission in the border region with Eritrea. The Canadian Minister of National Defence, Art Eggleton, visited these troops in Ethiopia that same year.

== High-level visits ==
High-level visits from Canada to Ethiopia

- Prime Minister Jean Chrétien (2003)
- Prime Minister Justin Trudeau (2020)

High-level visits from Ethiopia to Canada

- Emperor Haile Selassie (1954, 1967)
- Prime Minister Meles Zenawi (2010)

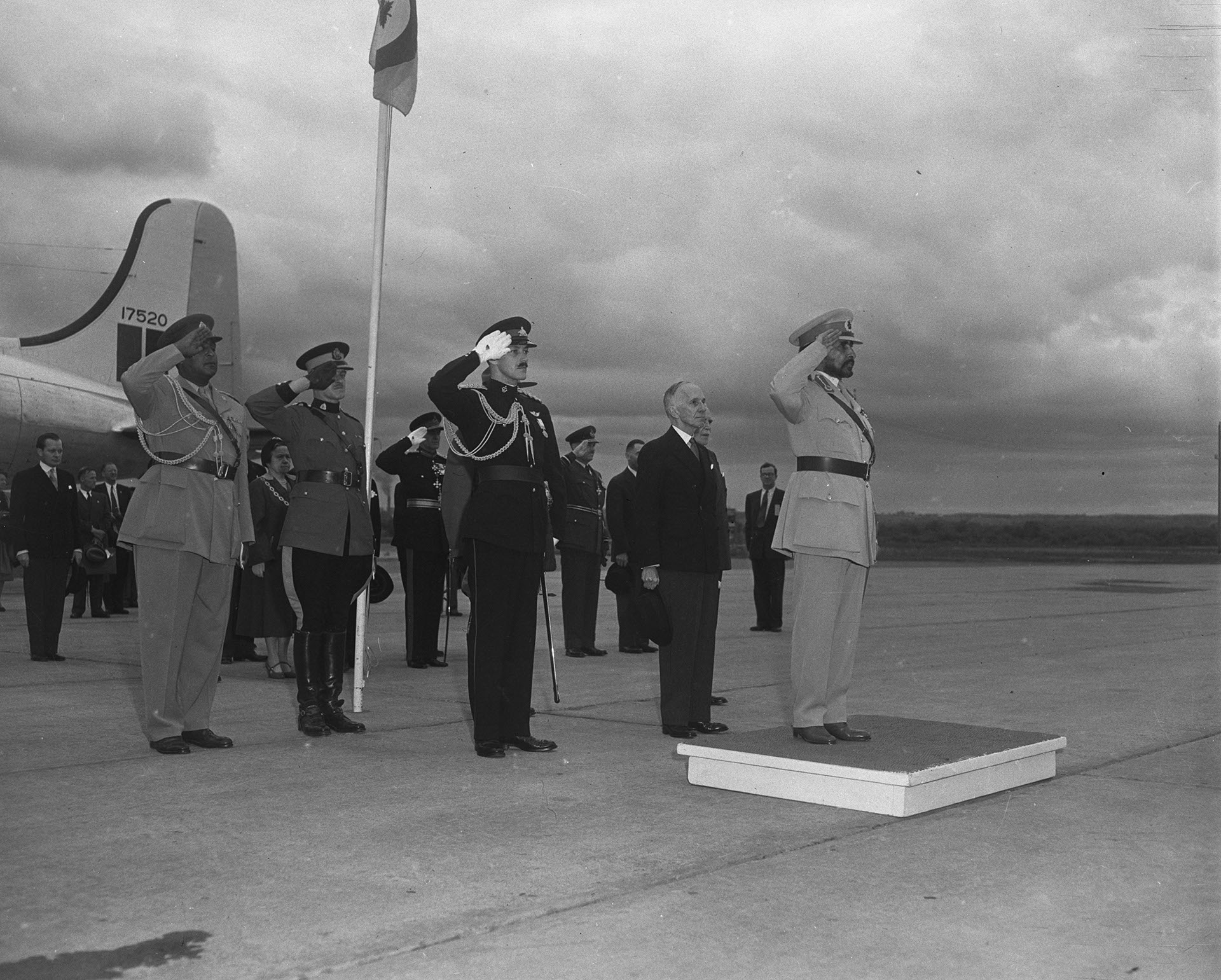
Emperor Haile Selassie and Governor General Vincent Massey at Rockcliffe Airport in Ottawa; 1954.

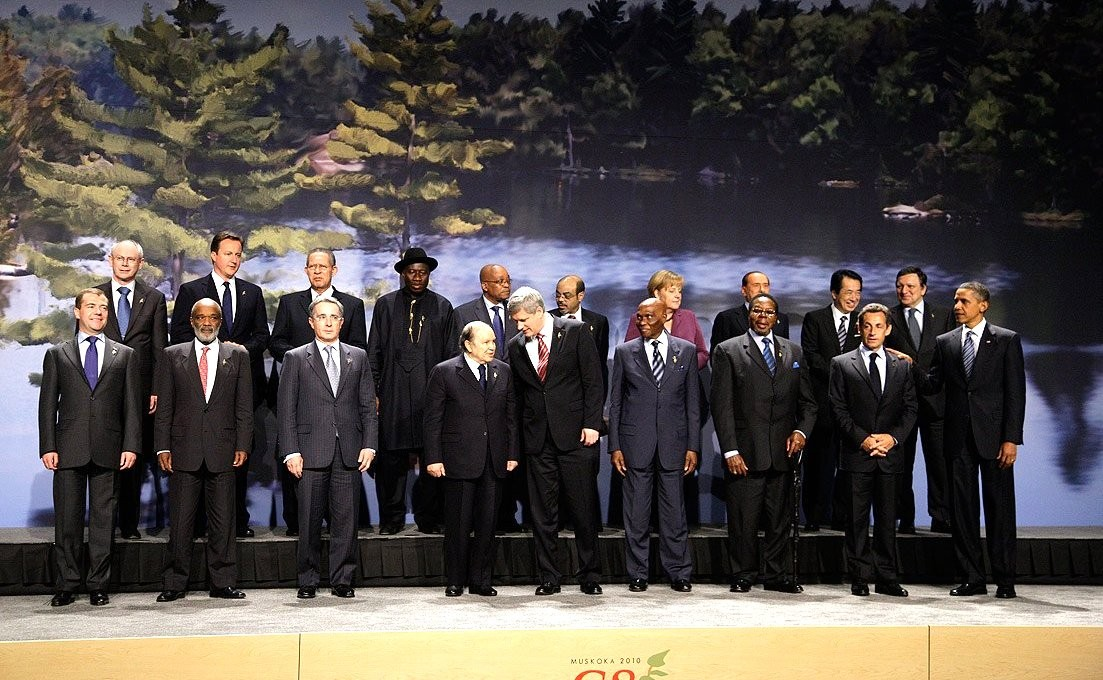
Prime Ministers Stephen Harper and Meles Zenawi attending the 36th G8 summit in Toronto; June 2010.

== Resident diplomatic missions ==
- Canada has an embassy in Addis Ababa.
- Ethiopia has an embassy in Ottawa.

== See also ==
- Africa–Canada relations
- Ethiopian Canadians
- Foreign relations of Canada
- Foreign relations of Ethiopia
