= Canada–Lesotho relations =

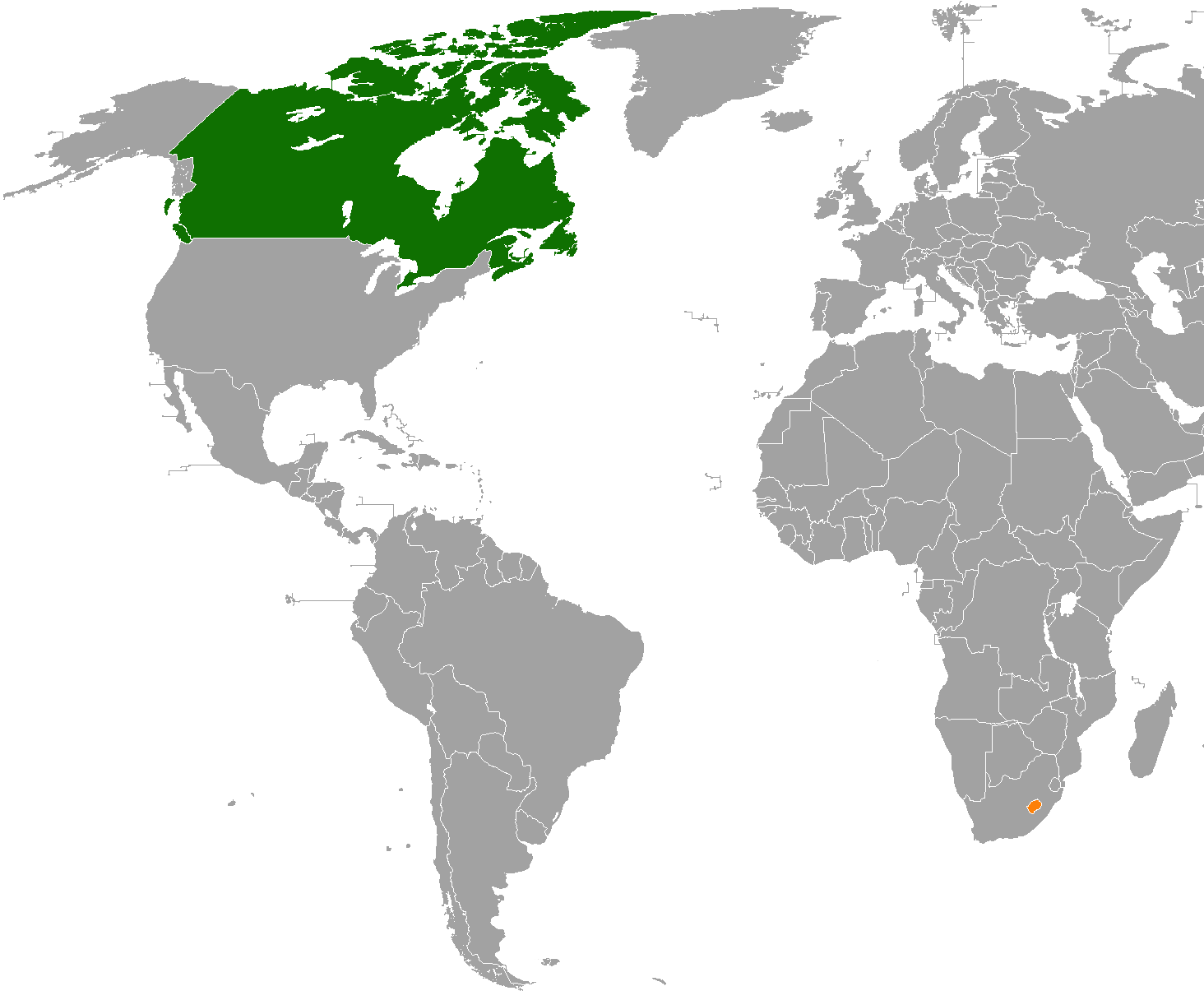

- Canada: Lesotho

Canada and Lesotho established diplomatic relations in 1966. Lesotho businesses can apply for support from the Canada Fund for Local Initiatives, which has funded projects focused on gender equality.

== Trade ==
In 2017, bilateral trade was $10 million, consisting of $9.7 million imports from Lesotho and $302,000 in exports to Lesotho.

== Foreign aid and development ==
Canadian NGOs and Foreign Aid provided by the Canadian Government have improved healthcare and education in Lesotho. Several politicians in Lesotho have used Canadian provided scholarships to get a college degree such as Pakalitha Mosisili, the 4th Prime Minister of Lesotho. Canada continues to strengthen ties by increasing foreign aid and university scholarships for high school students in Lesotho.

== Resident diplomatic missions ==
- Canada is accredited to Lesotho from its high-commission Pretoria, South Africa.
- Lesotho maintains a High Commission in Ottawa.
