= Burkina Faso–Canada relations =

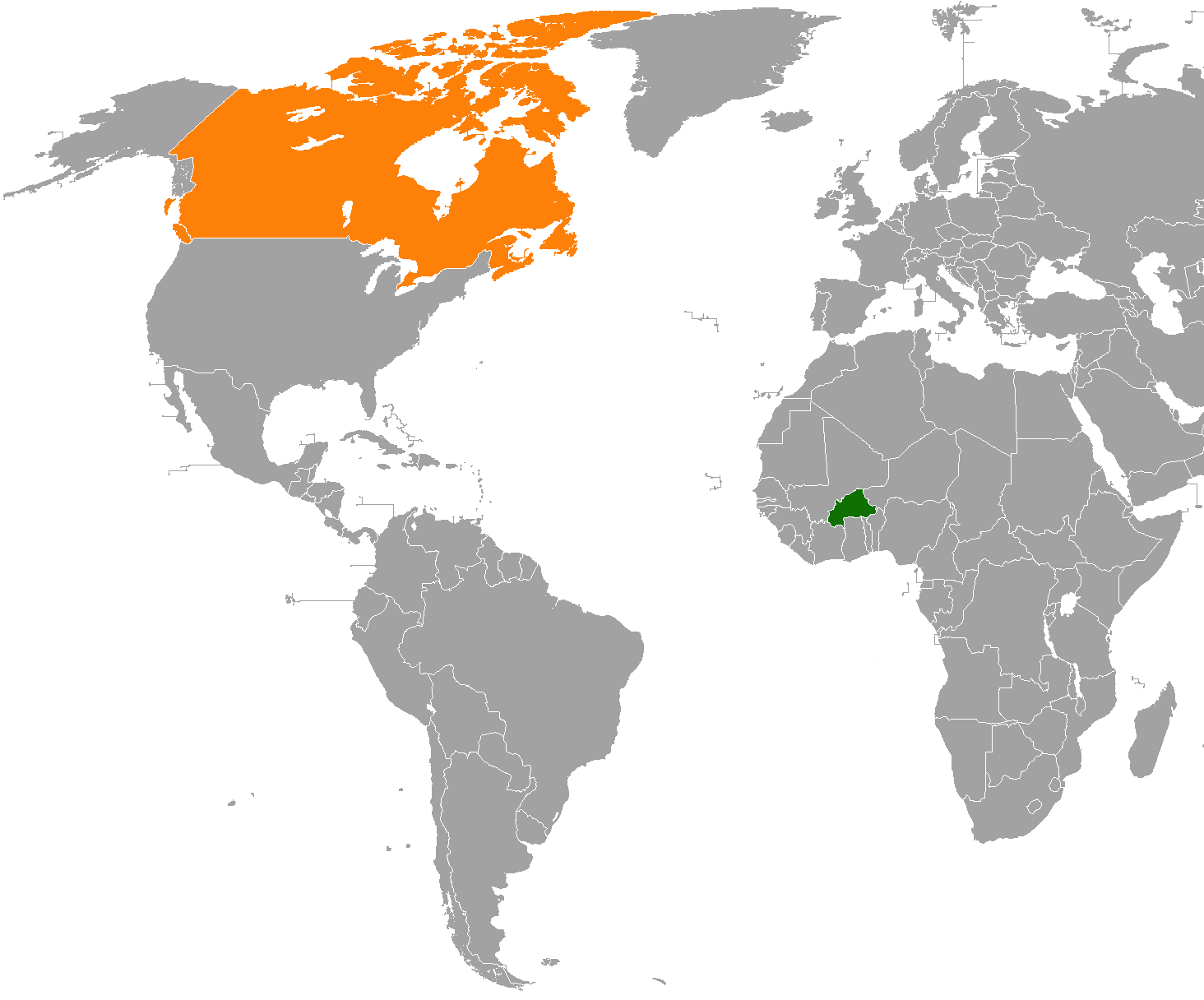

- Burkina Faso: Canada

Burkina Faso and Canada established diplomatic relations in 1962. Canada and Burkina Faso share French as a common language and work together on regional and multilateral issues.

== History ==
In 2019, Al-Qaeda in the Islamic Maghreb targeted a convoy of vehicles working for the Canadian gold mining firm Semafo. While authorities recorded the death toll to be at a minimum of 37, the death toll is likely to be much higher. Survivors have placed casualty estimates in the hundreds. The Canadian embassy to the country described the incident as a "terrorist attack against a convoy of Burkinabe workers of the Canadian mining company Semafo." The massacre also prompted a condemnation from Global Affairs Canada, Canada's foreign ministry. The incident was also denounced by Burkinabé authorities.

== Trade ==
In 2012 bilateral trade was worth $74.4 million. Canadian exports include machines, electrical equipment, rubber, vehicles, tools, medical equipment and manufactured iron and steel goods. Burkinabe exports include gemstones and oilseeds.

== Aid ==
In 2010 and 2011 Canada provided $34.85 million of foreign aid to Burkina Faso through the Canadian International Development Agency (CIDA).

== Resident diplomatic missions ==
Before 1995, Canada's ambassador to Côte d'Ivoire also represented the country's interests in Burkina Faso. In 1995 Canada established an embassy in Ouagadougou.

- Burkina Faso has an embassy in Ottawa.
- Canada has an embassy in Ouagadougou.

== See also ==
- Foreign relations of Burkina Faso
- Foreign relations of Canada
- List of ambassadors of Canada to Burkina Faso
