= Canada–Morocco relations =

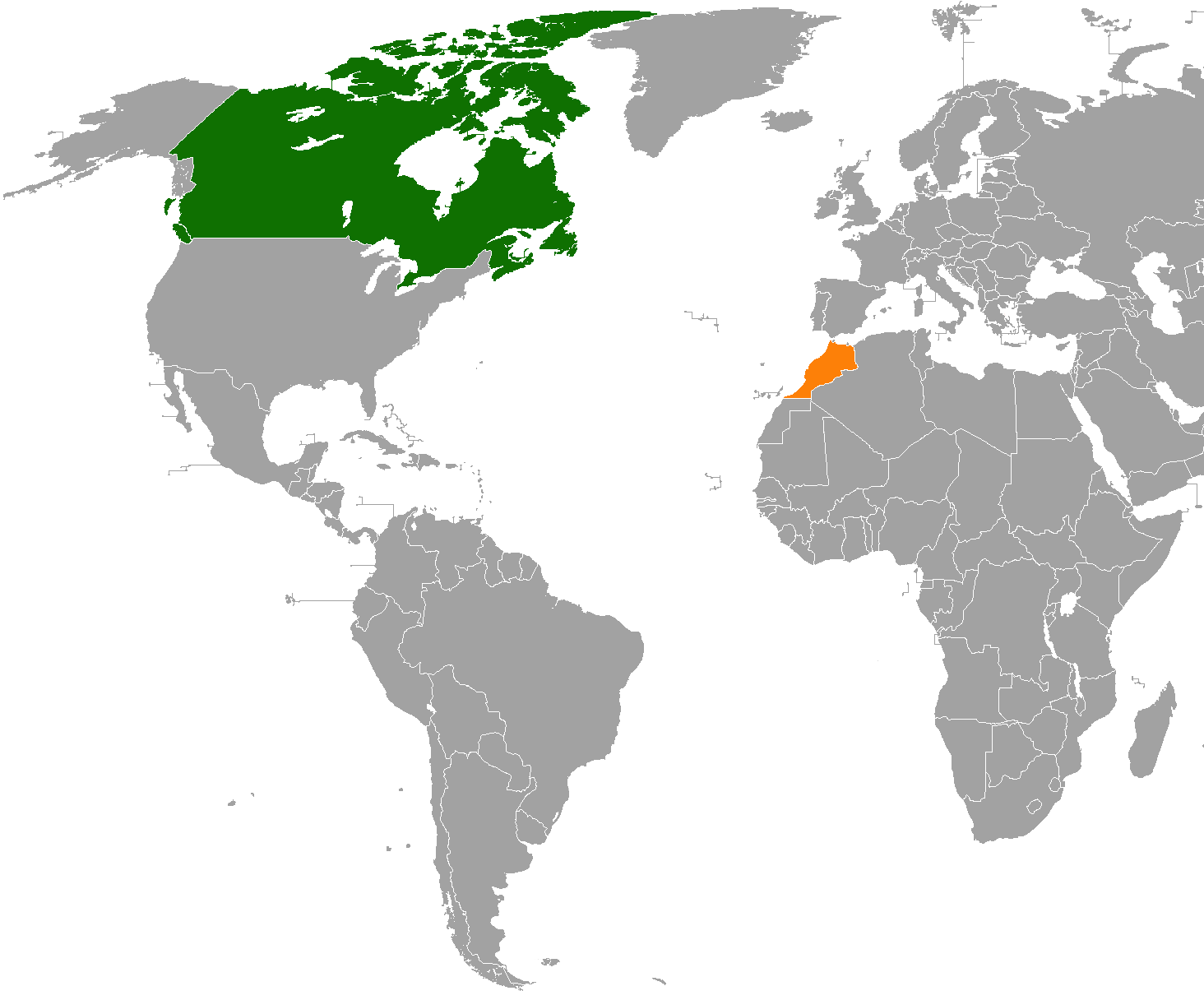

- Canada: Morocco

Canada recognized Morocco de jure on June 19, 1956, shortly after the independence of the latter, and the two countries established diplomatic relations on May 17, 1962. Canada has an embassy in Rabat. Morocco has an embassy in Ottawa and a general consulate in Montreal and in Toronto.

Both countries are full members of the Francophonie.

== The Exchange of Visits ==
- On March 6, 2024, the President of the Council of Advisors, Mr. Naim Myara, received at his office at the headquarters of the Council of Advisors in Rabat, Ms. Isabelle H. Vallerand, Extraordinary and Plenipotentiary Ambassador of Canada to the Kingdom, with the aim of strengthening the political relations between the two friendly countries, which have seen a continuous dynamic in recent years.

== Diaspora ==
There are 100,000 people of Moroccan descent living in Canada, 81,000 of which live in Quebec.

== Resident diplomatic missions ==
- Canada has an embassy in Rabat.
- Morocco has an embassy in Ottawa and consulates-general in Montreal and Toronto.

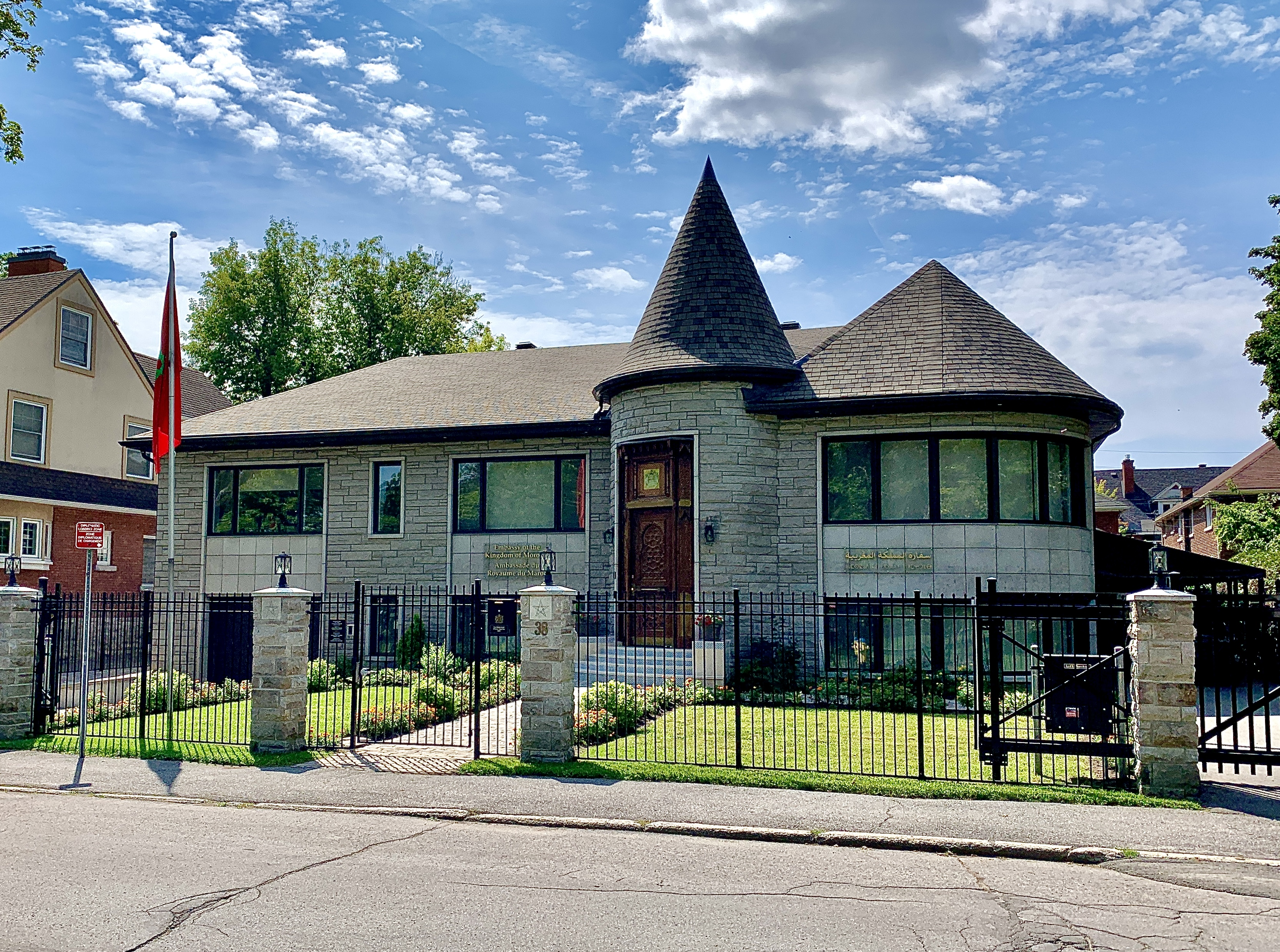
Embassy of Morocco in Ottawa

== See also ==
- Foreign relations of Canada
- Foreign relations of Morocco
- Moroccan Canadian
