= Hicham Bennir =

Canadian-Moroccan film director

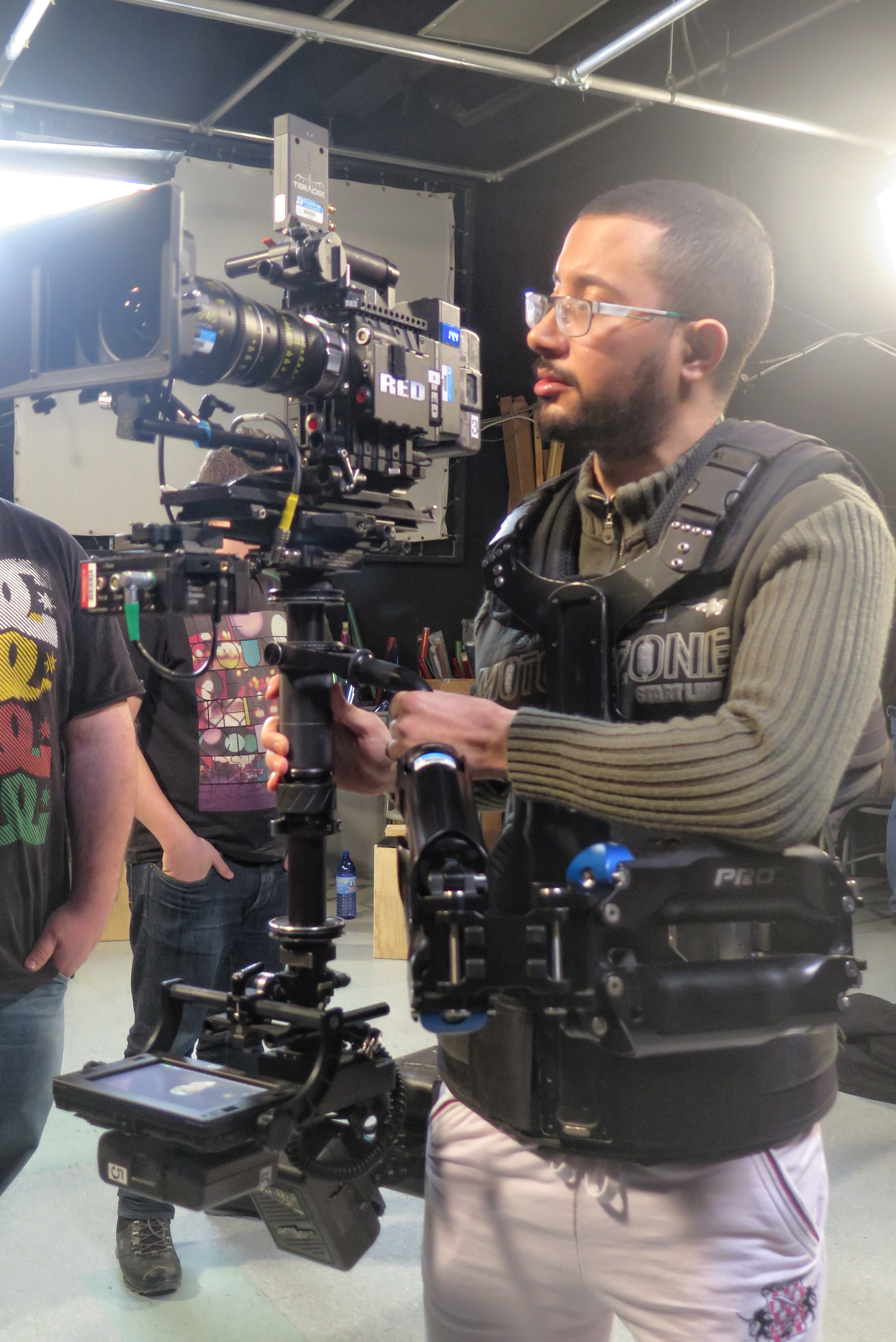
- Hicham Bennir operating a pro steadicam in studio in Montreal, Canada (2014)
- Education: Dawson College, O'Sullivan College of Montreal, Concordia University
- Years active: 2014 - Present
- Website: www.RadicalNew.com

Hicham Bennir (Arabic: هشام بنير) is a Canadian and Moroccan film director, cinematographer, editor, producer, writer and photographer.

== Career ==
He was the winner of the world photo contest in 2009 and 2010. He photographed many special events including Montreal Fashion Week, and Montreal Festival of Mode & Design, as well as French-Moroccan designer Jean-Charles de Castelbajac's fashion show in 2013. He studied filmmaking at O'Sullivan College of Montreal and Concordia University.

In 2014, Bennir directed the short film Perception that was set in Canada's largest film studio "Cite Mel's du Cinema", Bennir's latest short film is set in Morocco and titled The Price of Fame and is set to be released in 2016.

== Short films ==
- The Price of Fame (2015)
- Perception (2014)
- Andy Palacio - Remembering a Legend (Short Documentary) (2014)
- School of Terror "After 10" (2014)
- Xenophobe (2014)

== Books ==
- Universal Wisdom & Reflections (2015)

== Viral Videos ==
Hicham is also known for his "Live to Inspire" inspirational viral videos on social media. As of the end of 2016 his revamped videos of inspirational celebrity tips on success, as well as, comedic memes and short clips have been viewed more than 1 billion times. Some of his notable revamped inspirational videos include a segment of BBC1 Panorama’s Princess Diana interview which broke the internet being viewed more than 20million times in its first 24 hours of being published on Facebook. Other notable featured inspiring celebrity videos include Oprah Winfrey and J.K.Rowling.
