= Canada–Madagascar relations =

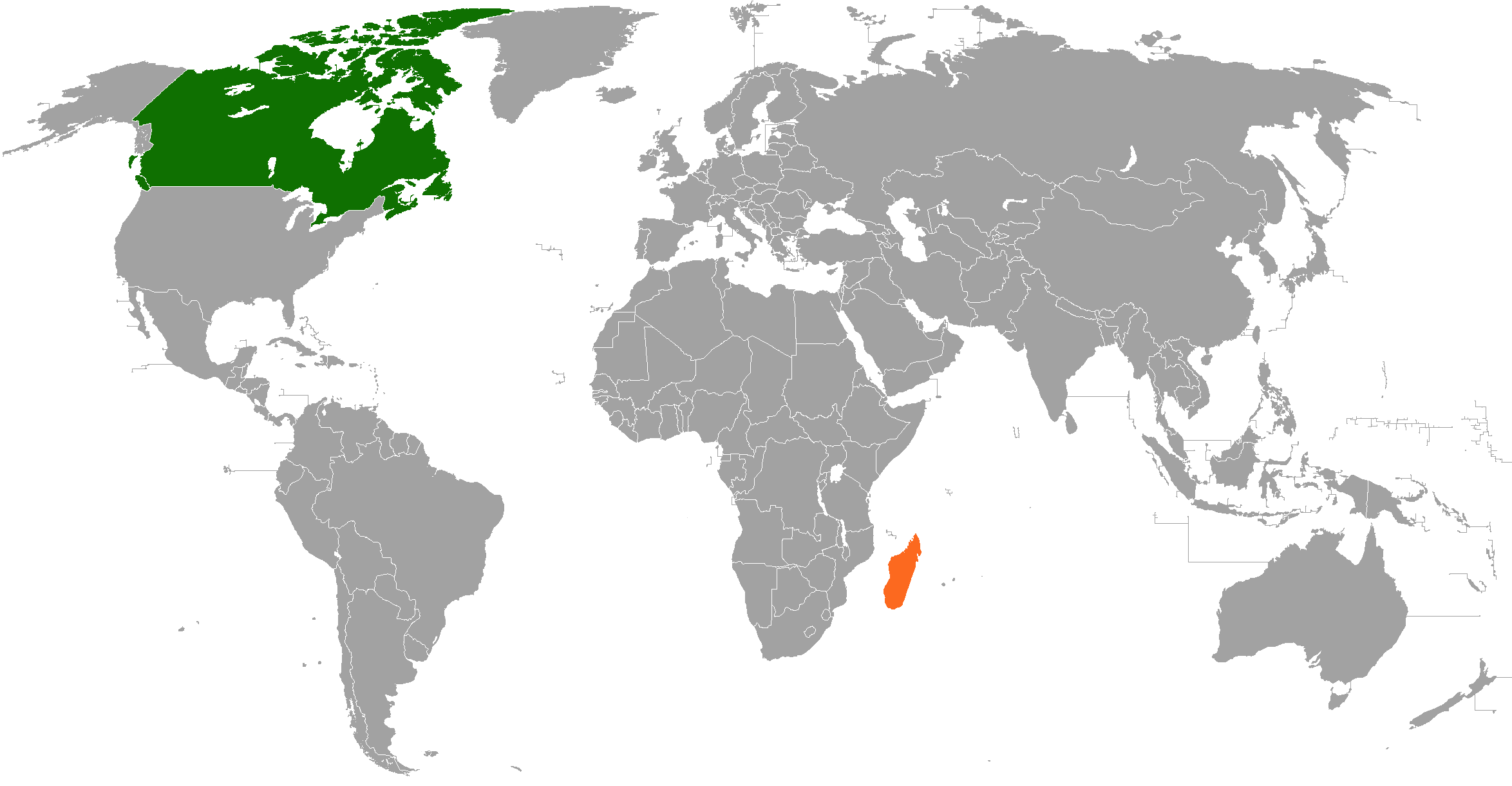

- Canada: Madagascar

The nations of Canada and Madagascar established diplomatic relations in 1965. In addition to their bilateral relations, both countries are full members of the Francophonie, United Nations and the World Trade Organization.

== History ==
Both Canada and Madagascar share a common history in the fact that both nations were once part of the French colonial empire. During World War II troops from both nations fought in the Battle of France (May–June 1940). In 1965, Canada recognized and established diplomatic relations with Madagascar, five years after the country obtained independence from France.

In September 1987, Malagasy president Didier Ratsiraka paid a visit to Canada to attend the 2nd Francophonie summit held in Quebec City and met with Canadian prime minister Brian Mulroney. In September 1999, Malagasy president Ratsiraka returned to Canada to attend the 8th Summit of the Francophonie held in Moncton and met with Canadian prime minister Jean Chrétien.

During the 2009 Malagasy political crisis which saw the removal of Malagasy president Marc Ravalomanana, Canada condemned the coup and the government crack-down on protesters. Democracy was restored to Madagascar after the election of President Hery Rajaonarimampianina in 2014. A delegation from the Canada-Africa Parliamentary Association visited Madagascar in March 2014.

In November 2016, Canadian prime minister Justin Trudeau paid a visit to Madagascar to attend the 16th Francophonie summit being held in the Malagasy capital of Antananarivo. Prime Minister Trudeau met with President Rajaonarimampianina where they discussed the signing of a Double Taxation Agreement between both nations. In February 2020, Prime Minister Justin Trudeau and Malagasy president Andry Rajoelina met on the margins of the 33rd African Union Summit in Addis Ababa, Ethiopia and discussed ways to deepen trade and investment between both nations.

== Trade ==
In 2023, trade between Canada and Madagascar totaled $191.9 million Canadian dollars. Canada's main exports to Madagascar include: nuclear machine equipment, miscellaneous textile articles, electric machinery and equipment, and dried peas. Madagascar's main exports to Canada include: titanium ore, spices, vanilla beans, dried fish (other than cod), coffee, and woven apparel. Canadian mining company, Sherritt International, is major investor in Malagasy mines.

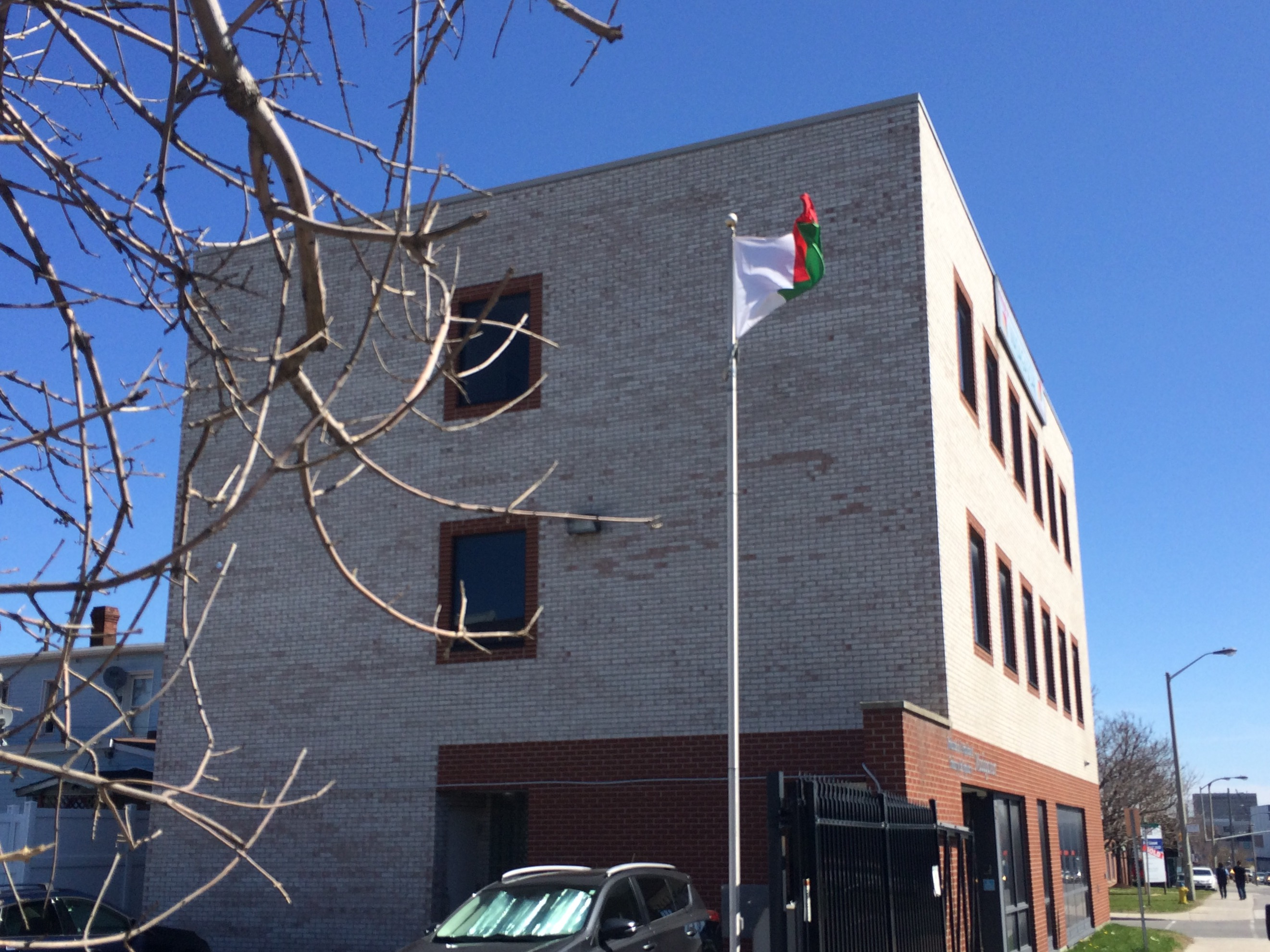
Embassy of Madagascar in Ottawa

== Diplomatic missions ==
- Canada is accredited to Madagascar from its high commission in Pretoria, South Africa.
- Madagascar has an embassy in Ottawa.

== See also ==
- Olivier Le Jeune
- Mathieu Razanakolona
