= Algeria–Canada relations =

- Algeria: Canada

Canada recognized Algeria following its independence from France in 1962, and formal diplomatic relations were established two years later in 1964.

== Bilateral Visits ==
In 2006, Canadian Governor General, Michaëlle Jean, visited Algeria as part of a tour of Africa, during which she promoted the partnership between Canada and Algeria in assisting in African development. In 2010, Algerian President Abdelaziz Bouteflika visited Canada to take part in the G8 summit in Muskoka. Lawrence Cannon, then the Minister of Foreign Affairs, visited Algeria in January 2011 and met with his Algerian counterpart, Minister of Foreign Affairs Mourad Medelci.

In 2019, Canada provided US$400,000 to the UN Refugee Agency to support those living in Sahrawi camps located in southwestern Algeria.

== Migration ==
The Algerian community in Canada numbers approximately 67,000 people, most of whom reside in and around Montreal. There are direct flight between both nations with Air Algérie and Air Canada.

== Security ==
Algeria claimed that two Canadians were among the Jihadi militants responsible for a hostage taking at an isolated natural gas plant in the Sahara desert in January 2013. Canada launched its own investigation. In March, the RCMP confirmed that one Canadian's body was identified to be related to the attack. The investigation was slowed by the fact that Canada and Algeria do not share intelligence information.

== Trade ==
Algeria is Canada's top trading partner in Africa. In 2018, two-way trade between both nations totaled US$778 million. There are more than 60 Canadian companies doing business in Algeria, and their varied activities range from basic foodstuffs to training services and aeronautics.

== Resident diplomatic missions ==
- Algeria has an embassy in Ottawa and a consulate-general in Montreal.
- Canada has an embassy in Algiers.
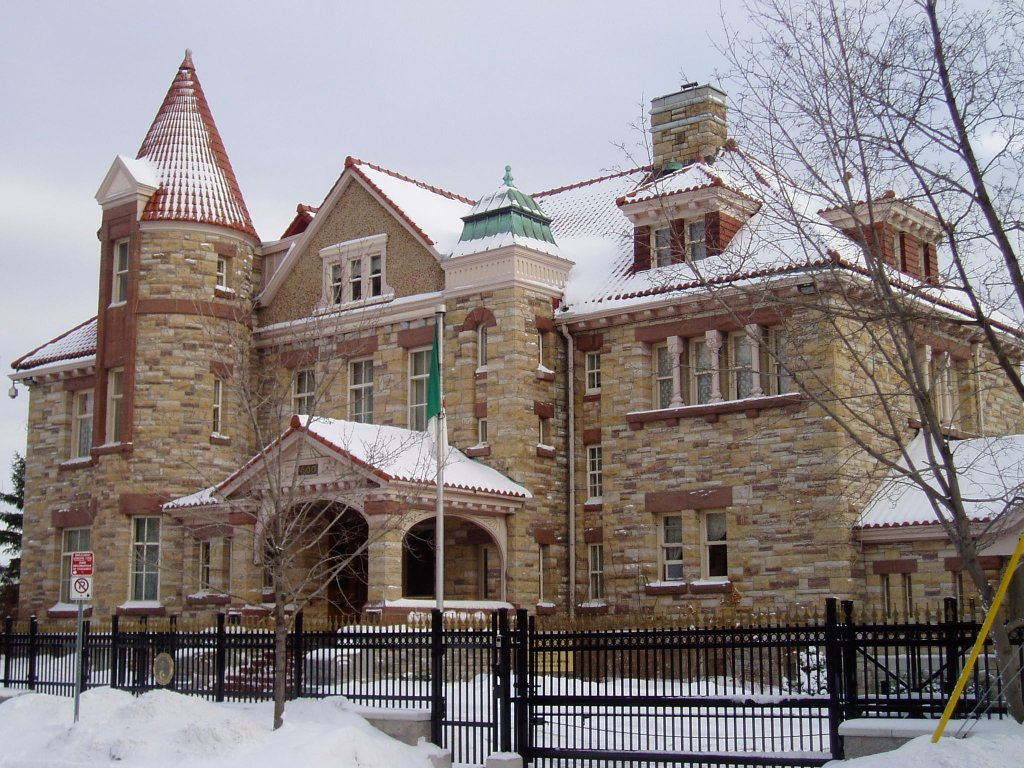
Embassy of Algeria in Ottawa

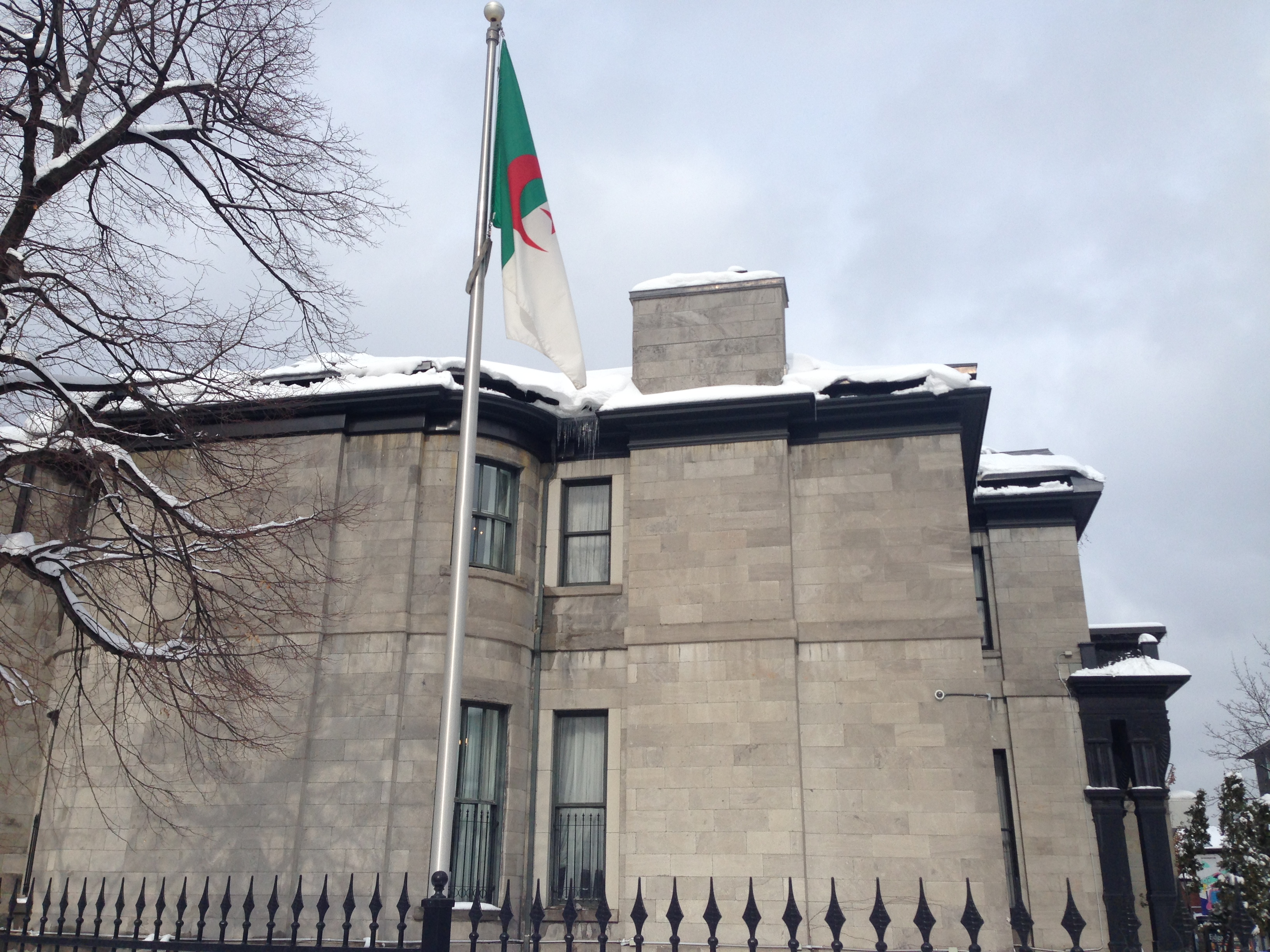
Consulate-General of Algeria in Montreal

== See also ==
- Algerian Canadians
