= Canada–Ivory Coast relations =

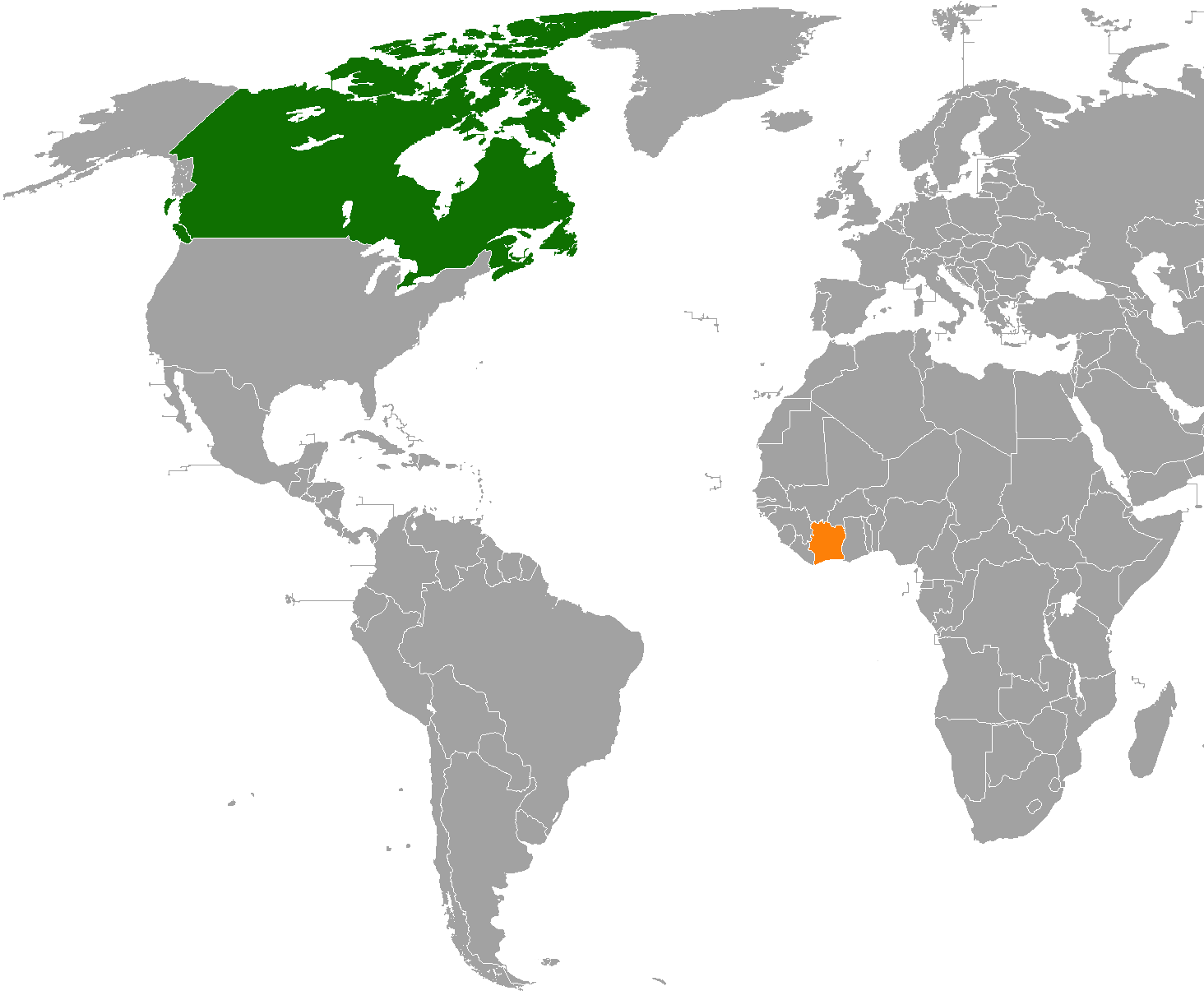

- Canada: Ivory Coast

Canada and Ivory Coast established diplomatic relations in 1962. In addition to their bilateral relations, both nations are members of the Organisation internationale de la Francophonie.

== History ==
Canada and Ivory Coast shared a brief common history in the fact that both nations were once part of the French colonial empire. During that time period, many Black Canadians today trace their ancestry to West Africa as their ancestors were brought directly to Canada as slaves by the French West India Company or brought in from the United States by traders. During World War II, both nations had troops fight in the Battle of France and in the Italian Campaign (soldiers from Ivory Coast were part of the French colonial empire's army).

In August 1960, Ivory Coast obtained its independence from France. In 1962, both Canada and Ivory Coast established diplomatic relations. In August 1967, Ivorian president Félix Houphouët-Boigny paid an official visit to Canada and met with Canadian prime minister Lester B. Pearson. In 1970 Canada opened an embassy in Abidjan and in 1972, Ivory Coast reciprocated the gesture by opening an embassy in Ottawa.

As a result of the First Ivorian Civil War; in May 2005, Canada issued sanctions against Ivory Coast following the decision by the United Nations Security Council in response to continued conflict within the country. Canada's economic sanctions against Ivory Coast included:

- A prohibition on the export of arms and related material to any person in Ivory Coast;
- A prohibition on the provision to any person in Ivory Coast of technical assistance related to military activities;
- An assets freeze against persons designated by the UN committee established pursuant to paragraph 14 of Resolution 1572 (2004) (the “1572 Committee”), persons designated by the 1572 Committee who are acting on behalf of, or at the direction of, another person designated by the committee, and entities owned or controlled by a person designated by the 1572 Committee; and
- A travel ban against persons designated by the 1572 Committee.

In January 2011, during the Second Ivorian Civil War, President Laurent Gbagbo ordered the expulsion of the Canadian ambassador from the country. Canadian prime minister Stephen Harper stated that he would not recognize the expulsion of the ambassador by President Gbagbo as Canada "doesn't recognize the current regime's claim to government, and therefore doesn't recognize its orders for Canadian diplomats to leave.". Canada had earlier asked Ivorian diplomats to leave Ottawa in protest to Gbagbo's refusal to cede power after he lost the November 28th, 2010 presidential run-off to Alassane Ouattara.

In 2012, Canada forgave $130-million in debt owed by Ivory Coast as part of an international effort to forgive billions in Ivorian debt as international players judge that President Alassane Ouattara is making headway in turning the country's finances and governance around. In 2016, Ivorian president Ouattara paid an official visit to Canada and met with Canadian prime minister Justin Trudeau.

== High-level visits ==
High-level visits from Canada to Ivory Coast

- Governor General Roméo LeBlanc (1999)

High-level visits from Ivory Coast to Canada

- President Félix Houphouët-Boigny (1967)
- President Alassane Ouattara (2016)

== Bilateral relations ==
Both nations have signed a few bilateral agreements, such as an Agreement on the Avoidance of Double-Taxation (1983); Air Transportation Agreement (1987) and an Agreement on the Promotion and Protection of Investment (2015). From 2016 to 2017, the total of Canadian development assistance for Ivory Coast was $19.9 million.

== Trade and Investment ==
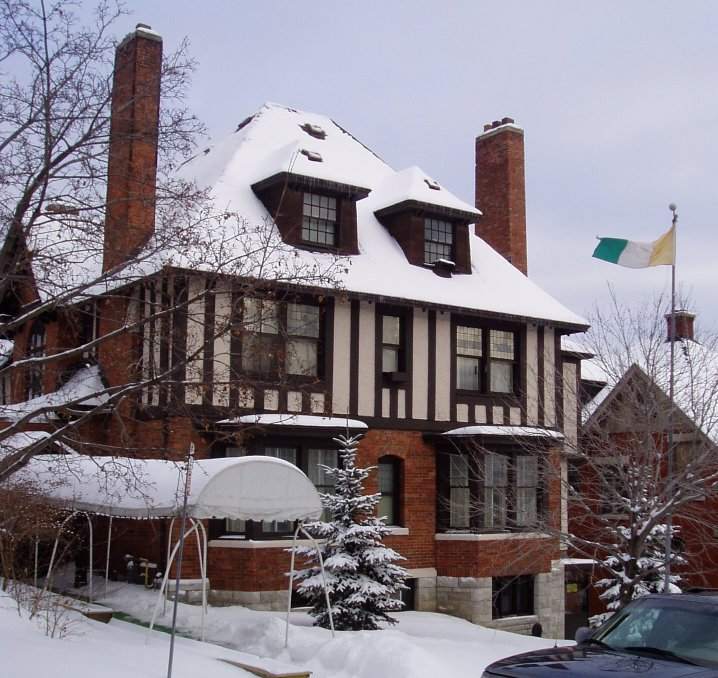
Embassy of Ivory Coast in Ottawa

In 2017, trade between Canada and Ivory Coast totaled US$358.4 million. Canadian main exports include: air and motor vehicles and related parts; cereals (mainly wheat); machinery; fertilizers; electric and electronic equipment; scientific and precision instruments; and meat. Ivory Coasts main exports include: oil; cocoa; rubber and rubber products; fruits and nuts; wood and wood products; and canned goods (fruits and vegetables).

== Resident diplomatic missions ==
- Canada has an embassy in Abidjan.
- Ivory Coast has an embassy in Ottawa.

== See also ==
- Demographics of Ivory Coast
