= Canada–Libya relations =

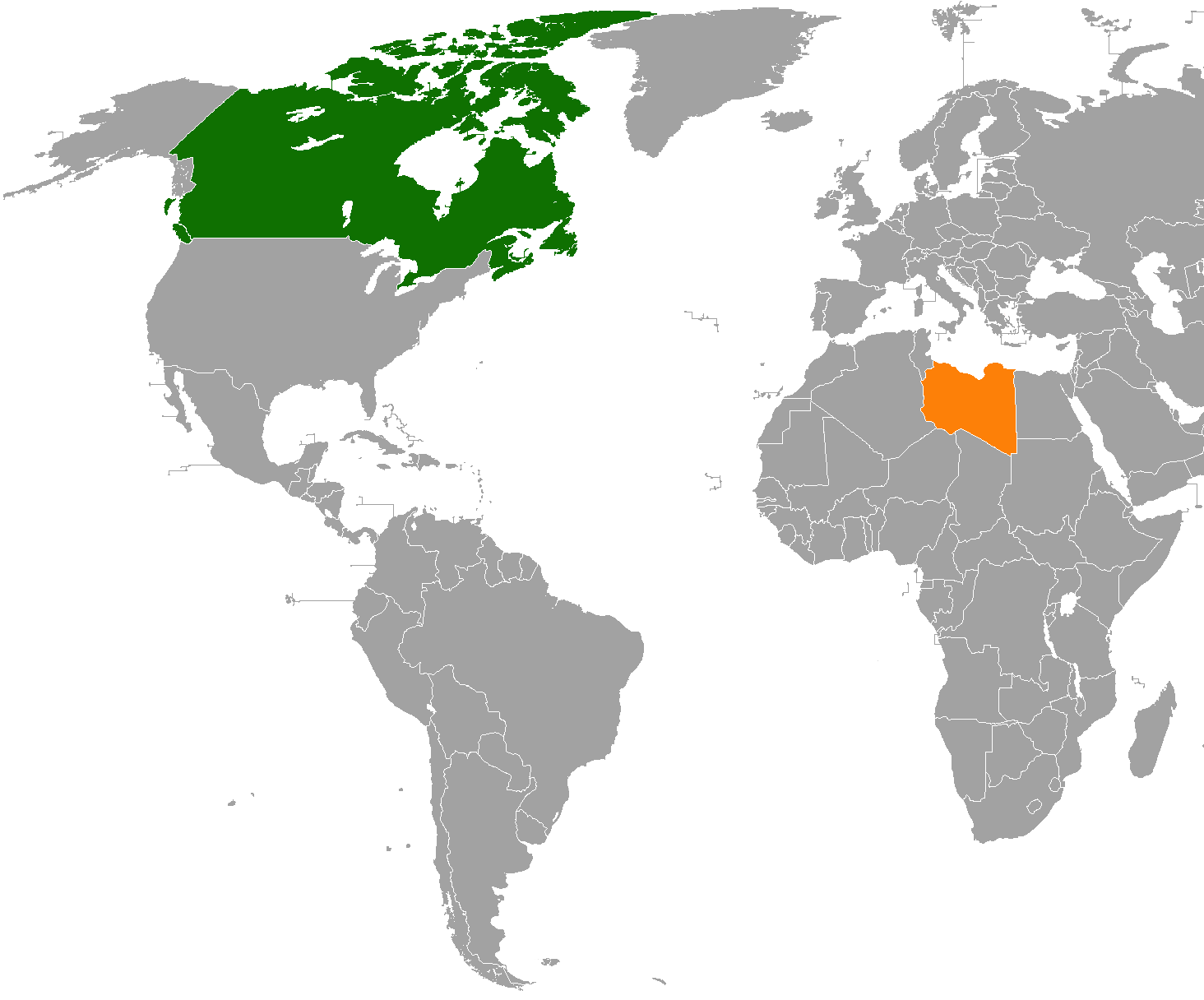

- Canada: Libya

Canada–Libya relations are the bilateral relations between Canada and Libya. The two countries are members of the United Nations.

== History ==
Both countries established diplomatic relations on 26 October 1968.

The Canada-Libya post-revolution bilateral relationship is based on a mutual interest in promoting democratic governance, respect for human rights and the rule of law, as well as a desire to strengthen commercial relations. In July 2014, Canada closed its embassy in Libya due to security challenges, and has temporarily relocated its operations to Tunisia. This measure is not permanent and has no affiliation with Canada's long-standing diplomatic relations with Libya. Canada aims to return to Tripoli when a secure and stable environment has been restored.

== Trade ==
Libya is an OPEC member and has Africa's largest proven oil reserves and the ninth largest globally. The country enjoys comparative affluence within the Middle East and North Africa region and is an important contributor to the global supply of crude oil.

Bilateral merchandise trade between Canada and Libya was $51.6 million in 2020. Top Canadian exports to Libya included motor vehicles and machinery products, while main imports included textiles and food products. Should stability and security return to Libya, Canadian companies could contribute to rebuilding efforts and help return bilateral trade to pre-revolution levels that stood at $270.8 million in 2010.

Libya's political and security situation presents significant challenges for Canadian companies who wish to do business in the Libyan market. Despite these challenges, there remain significant commercial opportunities in Libya for Canadian companies in the oil and gas, infrastructure and education sectors.

For over 30 years, the Canadian Bureau for International Education (CBIE) has been managing the Government of Libya's fully-funded Libyan North American Scholarship Program (LNASP), which allows Libyan post-secondary students to pursue higher education in Canada and the United States.

== Operations ==
In 2011, through its role in NATO Operation Unified Protector, Canada was among the first countries to respond to the demands by the Libyan people for democracy and freedom. The Government of Canada remains committed to supporting the Libyan people on the path towards peace and prosperity.

Since 2011, Canada has contributed $54 million towards stabilization and support for Libya, including $34 million in humanitarian assistance. Canada also contributed to the Deauville Partnership Middle East North Africa Transition Fund to strengthen governance and provide an economic framework for sustainable and inclusive growth in Libya and in several other countries in the region.

Canada continues to support efforts to build a stable, democratic and prosperous Libya, in cooperation with the United Nations (UN) and other international partners. Canada is supportive of ongoing efforts to work towards political reconciliation in Libya, facilitated by the UN, for the benefit of all Libyans.

== Partnership and Organizations ==
To develop effective responses to today's most pressing global challenges, Canada and Libya work closely in multilateral fora, such as:

- International Civil Aviation Organization (ICAO)
- United Nations (UN)
- United Nations Educational, Scientific and Cultural Organization (UNESCO)

== Resident diplomatic missions ==
- Canada is accredited to Libya from its embassy in Tunis, Tunisia.
- Libya maintains an embassy in Ottawa.

== Former Libyan ambassadors to Canada ==
- Fathi Baja
