= Canada–Senegal relations =

Diplomatic relations between Canada and Senegal

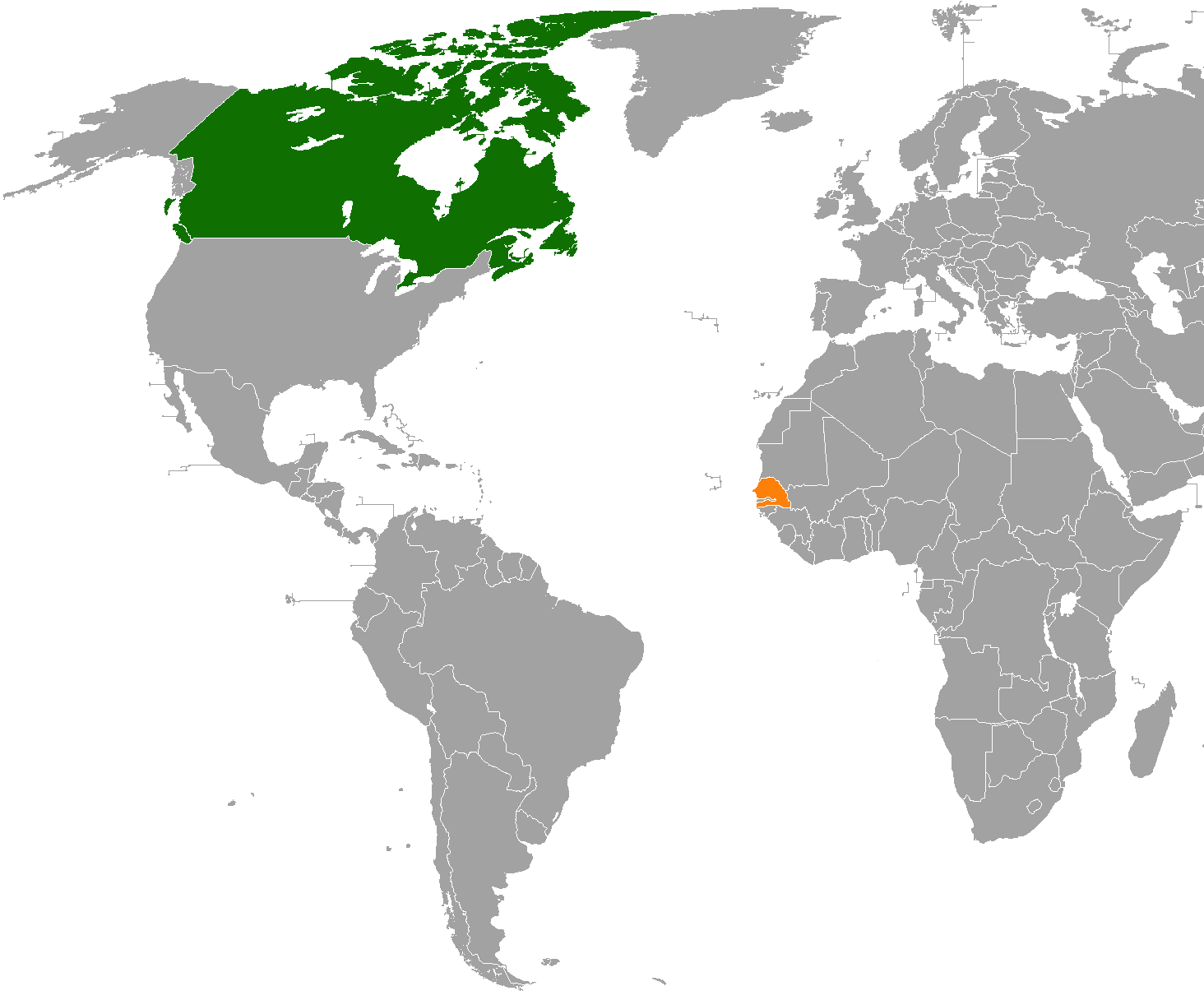

- Canada: Senegal

Diplomatic relations between Canada and Senegal began in 1962. Both nations are members of the Organisation internationale de la Francophonie.

== History ==
Canada and Senegal share a brief common history in the fact that both nations were once part of the French colonial empire. During that time period, many Black Canadians today trace their ancestry to West Africa as their ancestors were brought directly to Canada as slaves by the French West India Company or brought in from the United States by traders. During World War II, both nations had troops fight in the Battle of France and in the Italian Campaign.

In April 1960, Senegal obtained its independence from France. In 1962, Canada and Senegal established diplomatic relations. Soon afterwards, Canada opened an embassy in Dakar and in 1975, Senegal reciprocated the gesture by opening an embassy in Ottawa. In 1966 Senegalese President Léopold Sédar Senghor paid a ten-day visit to Canada, starting on 19 September. Since President Senghor's visit, there have been several high level visits between leaders of both nations. Senegal is a major partner for Canada within multilateral institutions, such as the Francophonie and the United Nations.

In February 2020, Canadian Prime Minister Justin Trudeau traveled to Senegal and met with President Macky Sall. During the press conference, Prime Minister Trudeau raised the issue of LGBT rights in Senegal with President Sall stating that Senegal was comfortable with their laws.

== High-level visits ==
High-level visits from Canada to Senegal

- Prime Minister Pierre Trudeau (1981)
- Prime Minister Brian Mulroney (1987, 1989)
- Prime Minister Jean Chrétien (1999, 2002)
- Prime Minister Stephen Harper (2012, 2014)
- Prime Minister Justin Trudeau (2020)

High-level visits from Senegal to Canada

- President Léopold Sédar Senghor (1966)
- President Abdou Diouf (1987, 1999)
- President Abdoulaye Wade (2002, 2008)
- President Macky Sall (2016)

== Bilateral relations ==
In 2001, Canada and Senegal signed a Double Taxation Agreement and a Customs Duties Exemption Agreement in 2004. In 2012 an Air Transportation Agreement was signed and that same year both nations concluded negotiations for a Foreign Investment Promotion and Protection Agreement (FIPA) agreement. In 2015, Canadian aid to Senegal amounted to US$85 million. Since Senegal's independence in 1962, Canada has donated more than $1.3 billion in official development assistance.

== Trade and investment ==
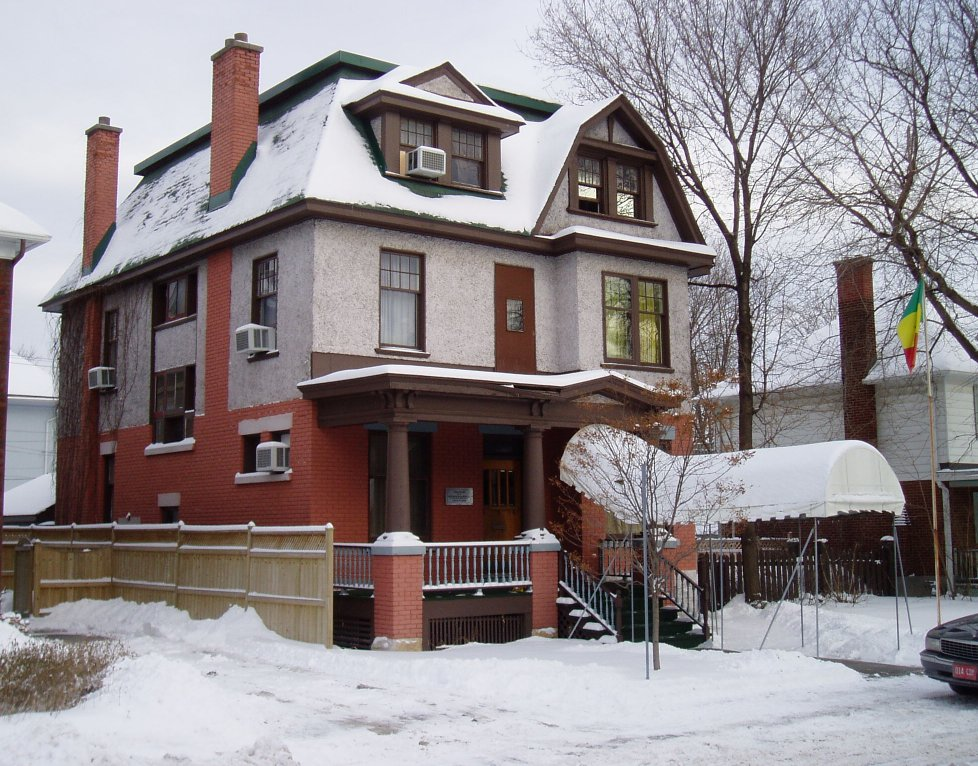
Embassy of Senegal in Ottawa

In 2015, trade between Canada and Senegal totaled US$42.6 million. Canada is a major investor in the mining industry of Senegal. Canadian mining companies such as Iamgold and Teranga Gold operate in Senegal. Canadian investments in the mining industry amount to US$500 million.

== Resident diplomatic missions ==
- Canada has an embassy in Dakar.
- Senegal has an embassy in Ottawa.

== See also ==
- Mining industry of Senegal
