= Canada–Tunisia relations =

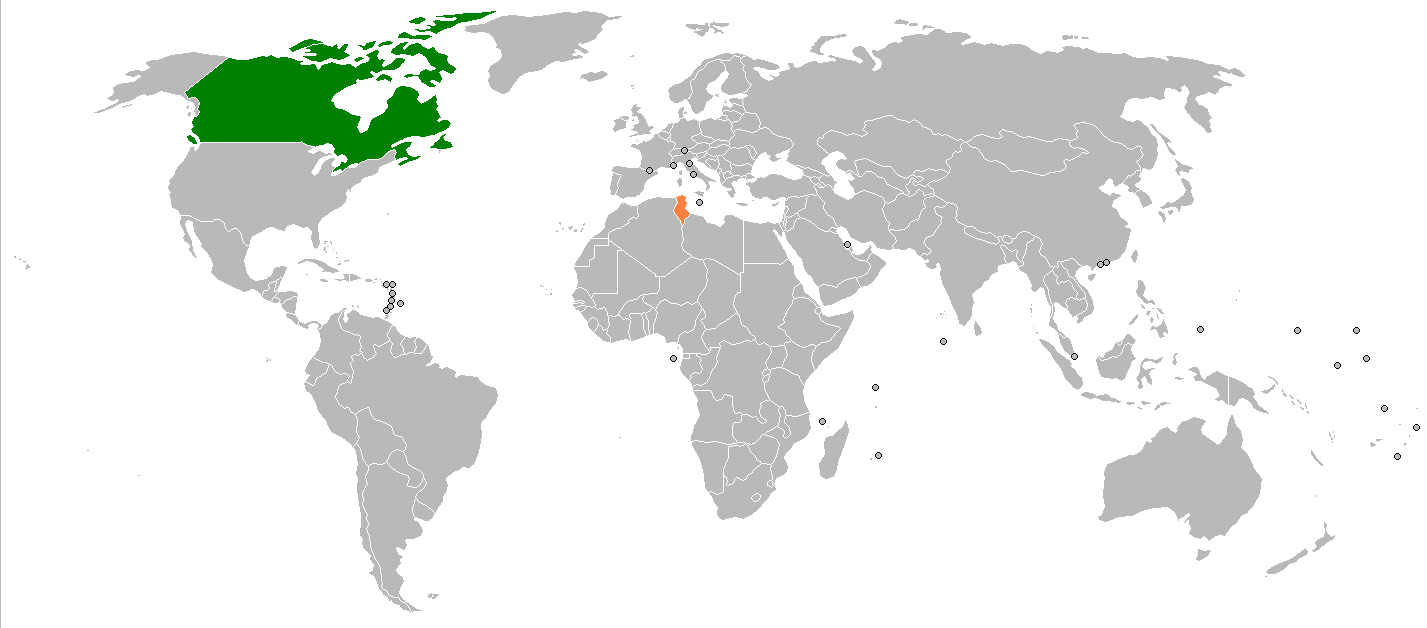

- Canada: Tunisia

Canada–Tunisia relations are foreign relations between Canada and Tunisia. Both countries established diplomatic relations in 1957. At first, the Tunisian government tried to establish relations and get help from both Canadian government and Quebec, but it turned out to be impossible. Since May 1966, Canada has an embassy in Tunis, the first Canadian embassy in North Africa. Since September 1969, Tunisia has an embassy in Ottawa and a consulate in Montreal.

Both countries are full members of the Francophonie.

Canada was always receptive to Tunisian requests for assistance. This led to increased economic and cultural cooperation.

== Resident diplomatic missions ==
Embassy of Canada in Tunis
- Location: Tunis
- Address: 24, rue de la Feuille d'érable, 1053 Les Berges du Lac 2، 24 Rue de la Feuille d'Érable
- Ambassador: Lorraine Diguer

Embassy of Tunisia in Ottawa
- Location: Ottawa
- Address: 515 O'Connor St K1S 3P8
- Ambassador: Hatem Boujemaa

There is a Canadian embassy in Tunis, and there is a Tunisian embassy in Ottawa. There is also a Tunisian consulate in Montreal.

== See also ==
- Foreign relations of Canada
- Foreign relations of Tunisia
