= Berber Canadians =

Ethnic group

Total population
- 41,700 (by ancestry, 2021 Census)

Regions with significant populations
- Quebec: 36,540
- Ontario: 3,055

Languages
- Canadian French · Canadian English · Berber languages · Arabic

Religion
- Sunni Islam · Judaism

Berber Canadians are Canadian citizens of Berber descent or persons of Berber descent residing in Canada.

== Demography ==
=== Population ===
According to the 2011 Census there were 25,885 Canadians who claimed Berber ancestry.

=== Religion ===
Berber Canadian demography by religion
Religious group	2021 (Note: Religious breakdown proportions based on "Berber" ethnic or cultural origin response on the 2021 census.)	
Religious group	Pop.	%
Islam	32,500	77.94%
Irreligion	8,180	19.62%
Christianity	765	1.83%
Judaism	130	0.31%
Other	125	0.3%
Total Berber Canadian population	41,700	100%

== See also ==
- Middle Eastern Canadians
- Berbers in France
