= Boualem =

Boualem (Arabic: بوعلام) is a masculine given name and surname of Arabic origin. Notable people with the name include:

== Given name ==
- Boualem Bel Alouane (born 1961), Algerian boxer
- Boualem Amirouche (born 1942), Algerian footballer
- Boualem Benhamouda (born 1933), Algerian politician
- Boualem Benmalek (born 1989), Algerian footballer
- Boualem Bensaïd (born 1967), Algerian Islamic terrorist
- Boualem Bessaïh (1930–2016), Algerian politician and writer
- Boualem Boualem (1952–2026), Algerian politician
- Boualem Boukacem (born 1957), Algerian singer
- Boualem Charef (born 1958), Algerian football player and manager
- Boualem Khouider, Algerian-Canadian applied mathematician, climate scientist, and author
- Boualem Khoukhi (born 1990), Algerian footballer
- Boualem Mankour (born 1970), French-Algerian football player and manager
- Boualem Mesmoudi (born 1994), Algerian footballer
- Boualem Miloudi (born 1965), Algerian judoka
- Boualem Rahal (1937–1957), Algerian activist
- Boualem Rahoui (born 1948), Algerian athlete
- Boualem Sansal (born 1949), Algerian-French author

== Surname ==
- Mohamed Boualem (born 1987), Algerian footballer

== Companies ==
- Hamoud Boualem, an Algerian soft drinks manufacturer

== Places ==
- Boualem, El Bayadh
- Boualem District
