= Robert O'Malley =

Robert O'Malley may refer to:

- Robert Emmett O'Malley (born 1943), United States Marine soldier and Medal of Honor recipient
- Robert Edmund O'Malley (1939–2020), American mathematician.
- Robert George O'Malley (1856–1938), Irish-born farmer and political figure in Manitoba
- Robbie O'Malley (born 1965), Irish Gaelic footballer

== See also ==
- Robert Malley (born 1963), American lawyer, political scientist and specialist in conflict resolution
