= Andrew Majda =

American mathematician (1949–2021)

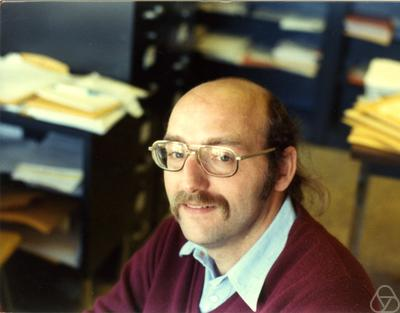
- Born: 30 January 1949; East Chicago, Indiana, US
- Died: 12 March 2021 (aged 72)
- Education: Stanford University; Purdue University
- Known for: Engquist–Majda absorbing boundary condition; Majda's model
- Awards: John von Neumann Award (1990); Norbert Wiener Prize (2013); Lagrange Prize (2015); Leroy P. Steele Prize (2016)
- Scientific career
- Fields: Mathematics
- Workplaces: New York University
- Doctoral advisor: Ralph S. Phillips
- Doctoral students: Andrea Bertozzi; Anne Bourlioux

Andrew Joseph Majda (30 January 1949 – 12 March 2021) was an American mathematician and the Morse Professor of Arts and Sciences at the Courant Institute of Mathematical Sciences of New York University. He was known for his theoretical contributions to partial differential equations as well as his applied contributions to diverse areas including shock waves, combustion, incompressible flow, vortex dynamics, and atmospheric sciences.

== Career ==
Born in East Chicago, Indiana, in a family of Polish immigrants, Majda received a B.S. degree in mathematics from Purdue University in 1970. He then received M.S. and Ph.D. degrees in mathematics from Stanford University in 1971 and 1973, respectively. His Ph.D. thesis advisor was Ralph S. Phillips. He began his scientific career as an instructor at the Courant Institute of Mathematical Sciences from 1973 to 1975. Prior to returning to the Courant Institute in 1994, he held professorships at Princeton University during 1984–1994, the University of California, Berkeley during 1978–1984, and the University of California, Los Angeles during 1976–1978. At Courant Institute, Majda was instrumental in setting up the "Center for Atmosphere-Ocean Science" which aims to promote cross-disciplinary research with modern applied mathematics in climate modelling and prediction.

He had 29 PhD sutdents.

== Honors and awards ==
- The Leroy P. Steele Prize for Seminal Contribution to Research - 2016
- Lagrange Prize of ICIAM - 2015
- Norbert Wiener Prize in Applied Mathematics - 2013
- Honorary Doctorate of Science and Honorary Professor, Fudan University, Shanghai, China - 2008
- Medal of the College de France - 2007
- The New York City Mayor's Award for Excellence in Mathematical, Physical, and Engineering Sciences - 2004
- Honorary Doctorate of Science, Purdue University - 2000
- Gibbs Lecturer of the American Mathematical Society - 1995
- National Academy of Sciences Prize in Applied Mathematics and Numerical Analysis - 1992
- John von Neumann Lecture Prize of SIAM - 1990
- Medal of the College de France - 1982

Majda was a member of National Academy of Sciences, American Mathematical Society, American Physical Society, and Society for Industrial and Applied Mathematics. In 2012 he became a fellow of the American Mathematical Society.

The American Mathematical Society published a memorial tribute written by colleagues Bjorn Engquist, Panagiotis Souganidis, Samuel N Stechmann and Vlad Vicol in its November 2023 issue.

== Books ==
- Information theory and stochastics for multiscale nonlinear systems with Rafail V. Abramov, Marcus J. Grote, American Mathematical Society, 2005.
- Vorticity and Incompressible Flow with Andrea L. Bertozzi, Cambridge University Press, 2008.
- Nonlinear Dynamics and Statistical Theories for Basic Geophysical Flows with Xiaoming Wang, Cambridge University Press, 2009.
- Filtering Complex Turbulent Systems with John Harlim, Cambridge University Press, 2012.
- Introduction to Turbulent Dynamical Systems in Complex Systems, Springer, 2016.
