= Bob O'Malley =

Bob O'Malley may refer to:

- Robert Edmund O'Malley (1939–2020), American mathematician
- Robbie O'Malley (born 1965), Irish Gaelic footballer
