= Kevin Jean-Louis =

Mauritian association football player

Personal information
- Full name: Kevin Obrian Jean-Louis
- Date of birth: June 27, 1989 (age 37)
- Place of birth: Terre Rouge, Mauritius
- Height: 1.88 m (6 ft 2 in)
- Position: Goalkeeper

Team information
- Current team: Pamplemousses SC
- Number: 1

Youth career
- St Francis Xavier Football School

Senior career*
Years	Team	Apps	(Gls)
- Pamplemousses SC

International career
2009–	Mauritius	63	(0)
- * Club domestic league appearances and goals

Kevin Jean-Louis is a Mauritian goalkeeper who now plays for Pamplemousses SC and the Mauritius national football team, otherwise known as Club M.

== Early life ==
His father a former footballer, Kevin Jean Louis was admitted into the St Francis Xavier Football School at age 11. Mentored by Marcel Guillaume, he chose to be a goalkeeper, equivalent to his father. At age 17, he got an offer to go to Pamplemousses SC, which he accepted.

== Club career ==
Mauritian goalkeeper Kevin Jean-Louis has attracted interest from two foreign teams: SS Saint-Louisienne in Réunion and FC Wohlen in Switzerland.

== International career ==
Newly appointed French manager Alain Happe, successor of Didier Six chose Kevin Jean-Louis to be included in the squad for the 2017 Africa Cup of Nations qualification rounds in which there were formidable national squads such as Ghana
