= Cooper Legrand =

Mauritian footballer (born 1998)

Personal information
- Date of birth: 30 December 1998 (age 27)
- Place of birth: Australia
- Height: 1.83 m (6 ft 0 in)
- Position: Midfielder

Team information
- Current team: Port Melbourne Sharks
- Number: 7

Youth career
- 2016–2017: Richmond

Senior career*
Years	Team	Apps	(Gls)
2017	Richmond	7	(0)
2018–2021	Kingston City	56	(15)
2022–2023	Dandenong City	44	(5)
2024–	Kingston City	18	(9)

International career^{‡}
2017	Mauritius U20	3	(0)
2017–	Mauritius	3	(0)
- * Club domestic league appearances and goals as of 13:34, 15 April 2024 (UTC) ‡ National team caps and goals as of 13:34, 5 April 2024 (UTC)

Cooper Legrand (born 30 December 1998) is a Mauritian professional footballer who plays as a midfielder for Port Melbourne Sharks and the Mauritius national football team.

== Club career ==
Legrand started his senior professional career at Richmond in the 2017 NPL Victoria 2 East season after scoring 40 goals in 44 games in the 2017 NPL 2 Under-20 league and the 2016 NPL Under-18 league.

== International career ==
At the youth level, Cooper represented Mauritius national under-20 football team in the 2017 COSAFA U-20 Cup.

Legrand received his first two call-ups to Mauritius Senior National Team from Francisco Filho for an October 2017 friendly match against Equatorial Guinea and a March 2018 friendly match against Macau.

He was called back to Mauritius by Fidy Rasoanaivo for the 2025 Africa Cup of Nations qualification matches against Chad in March 2024.

== Career statistics ==
=== Club ===
As of 15 April 2024.

Club	Season	League			Other		Total	
Club	Season	Division	Apps	Goals	Apps	Goals	Apps	Goals
Richmond SC	2017	NPL Victoria 2 East	7	0	0	0	7	0
Kingston City	2018	NPL Victoria	20	3	1 (Note: Appearances in the FFA Cup)	0	21	3
Kingston City	2019	NPL Victoria	23	5	0	0	23	5
Kingston City	2021	NPL Victoria 2	11	7	1	0	12	7
Dandenong City	2022	NPL Victoria	24	3	1	0	25	3
Dandenong City	2023	NPL Victoria 2	16	1	3	1	19	2
Kingston City	2024	NPL Victoria 2	16	8	2	1	18	9
Career total			117	27	8	2	125	29

=== International ===
As of matches played 31 March 2024.

National team	Year	Apps	Goals
Mauritius	2017	1	0
Mauritius	2018	1	0
Mauritius	2024	1	0
Total		3	0

== Honours ==
Dandenong City

- NPL Victoria 2 Champions: 2023
