= Jonathan Bru =

Mauritian footballer (born 1985)

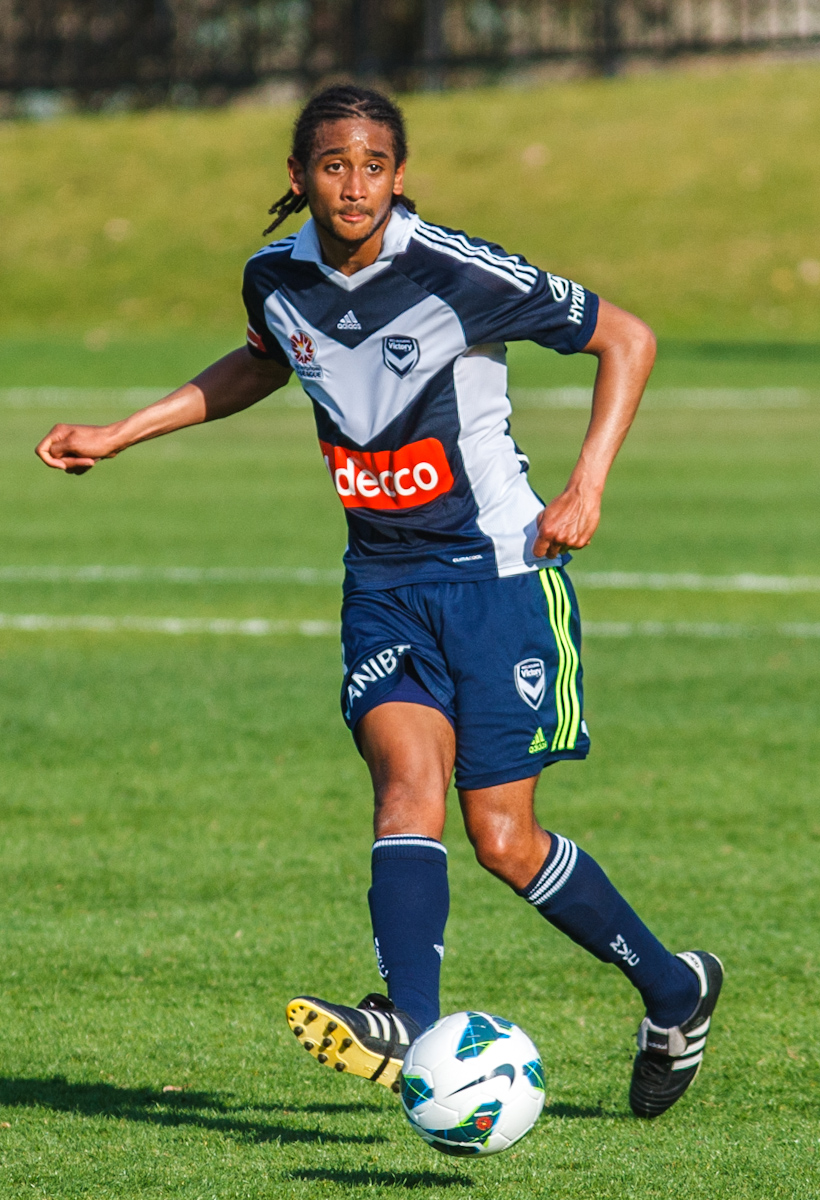
- Bru in action with Melbourne Victory during pre-season in 2012

Personal information
- Date of birth: 2 May 1985 (age 41)
- Place of birth: Neuilly-sur-Seine, France
- Height: 1.82 m (6 ft 0 in)
- Position: Defensive midfielder

Team information
- Current team: Red Star II (manager)

Youth career
- 1995–1998: CS Brétigny
- 1998–2001: Clairefontaine
- 2001–2004: Rennes

Senior career*
Years	Team	Apps	(Gls)
2004–2006	Rennes B	75	(5)
2006	Rennes	1	(0)
2006–2008	Istres	23	(1)
2008–2009	AEP	20	(0)
2009–2010	Académica	3	(0)
2010–2011	Oliveirense	28	(2)
2011–2012	Moreirense	11	(1)
2012–2014	Melbourne Victory	19	(0)
2014–2015	Oliveirense	26	(2)
2016	AS Poissy	7	(0)
Total		206	(11)

International career
2000–2001	France U16	6	(0)
2001–2002	France U17	13	(1)
2002–2003	France U18	8	(1)
2003–2004	France U19	8	(1)
2004–2005	France U21	1	(0)
2010–2016	Mauritius	21	(3)

Managerial career
- ?–2022: Red Star youth
- 2022–: Red Star II
Medal record
Men's football
Representing France
UEFA European Under-17 Championship
Runner-up	2002 Denmark
- * Club domestic league appearances and goals

Jonathan Bru (born 2 May 1985) is a former professional footballer who played as a defensive midfielder. Born in France, he represented France at youth international level before playing for the Mauritius national team. He works as head coach of the Red Star reserves.

== Club career ==
=== France ===
Born in Neuilly-sur-Seine, France, Bru played youth football at CS Brétigny, INF Clairefontaine and Stade Rennais. He began his professional career with the latter, making only one Ligue 1 appearance during his spell.

In the summer of 2006, Bru moved to FC Istres in Ligue 2, playing nine games in his first year and being relegated.

=== Cyprus and Portugal ===
After one season with AEP Paphos FC in the Cypriot First Division, Bru joined Académica de Coimbra in Portugal, appearing in only four official matches in his debut campaign in the Primeira Liga.

On 26 July 2010, he signed a one-year deal with Segunda Liga side U.D. Oliveirense, scoring his first goal for his new club on 23 October in a 1–1 home draw against S.C. Freamunde.

In August 2011, Bru continued in Portugal's second level, signing with Moreirense FC. He netted his first goal against his former team, the 3–2 game-winner on 2 October (away fixture).

=== Australia ===
On 20 June 2012, Bru signed a two-year deal with two-time A-League champions Melbourne Victory FC, as Ange Postecoglou's first import signing. He helped his new team to the preliminary finals in his first year by making 19 out of a possible 29 appearances, but also nearly came to blows with teammate Danny Allsopp after a training ground incident.

On 8 January 2014, after spending several weeks training on his own, Bru was released by the Victory. After almost nine months without a club, he returned to Oliveirense and the Portuguese second division.

== International career ==
Bru represented France in almost every youth team, but never made an appearance for the senior side. In June 2009, he told Mauritian newspaper L'Express that he hoped to play one day for Mauritius, since both of his parents were born in the country; this became a reality when Mauritius head coach Akbar Patel called him to the squad for the 2012 Africa Cup of Nations qualifying campaign.

Bru made his debut on 4 September 2010 in a 3–1 defeat at the hands of Cameroon, scoring the national team's goal through a penalty kick. His second goal came on 5 June of the following year against DR Congo, also for the ACN qualifiers and from the penalty spot.

In August 2011, Bru was called up by Mauritius for the 2011 Indian Ocean Island Games, and played in all of the matches en route to the final, a loss to Seychelles on penalties.

== Managerial career ==
In August 2022 Bru was appointed head coach of the reserve team of Paris-based club Red Star.

== Personal life ==
Bru's younger brother, Kévin, is also a football midfielder. He spent most of his career in France – with a lengthy spell in England with Ipswich Town – and also represented Mauritius internationally.

== Career statistics ==
=== International goals ===
Scores and results list Mauritius' goal tally first, score column indicates score after each Bru goal.

List of international goals scored by Jonathan Bru
No.	Date	Venue	Opponent	Score	Result	Competition
1	4 September 2010	Stade Anjalay, Belle Vue Harel, Mauritius	Cameroon	1–1	1–3	2012 Africa Cup of Nations qualification
2	5 June 2011	Stade Anjalay, Belle Vue Harel, Mauritius	DR Congo	1–0	1–2	2012 Africa Cup of Nations qualification
3	7 October 2015	Stade Anjalay, Belle Vue Harel, Mauritius	Kenya	2–3	2–5	2018 World Cup qualification

== Honours ==
- Indian Ocean Island Games runner-up: 2011
