= Jimmy Cundasamy =

Mauritian footballer

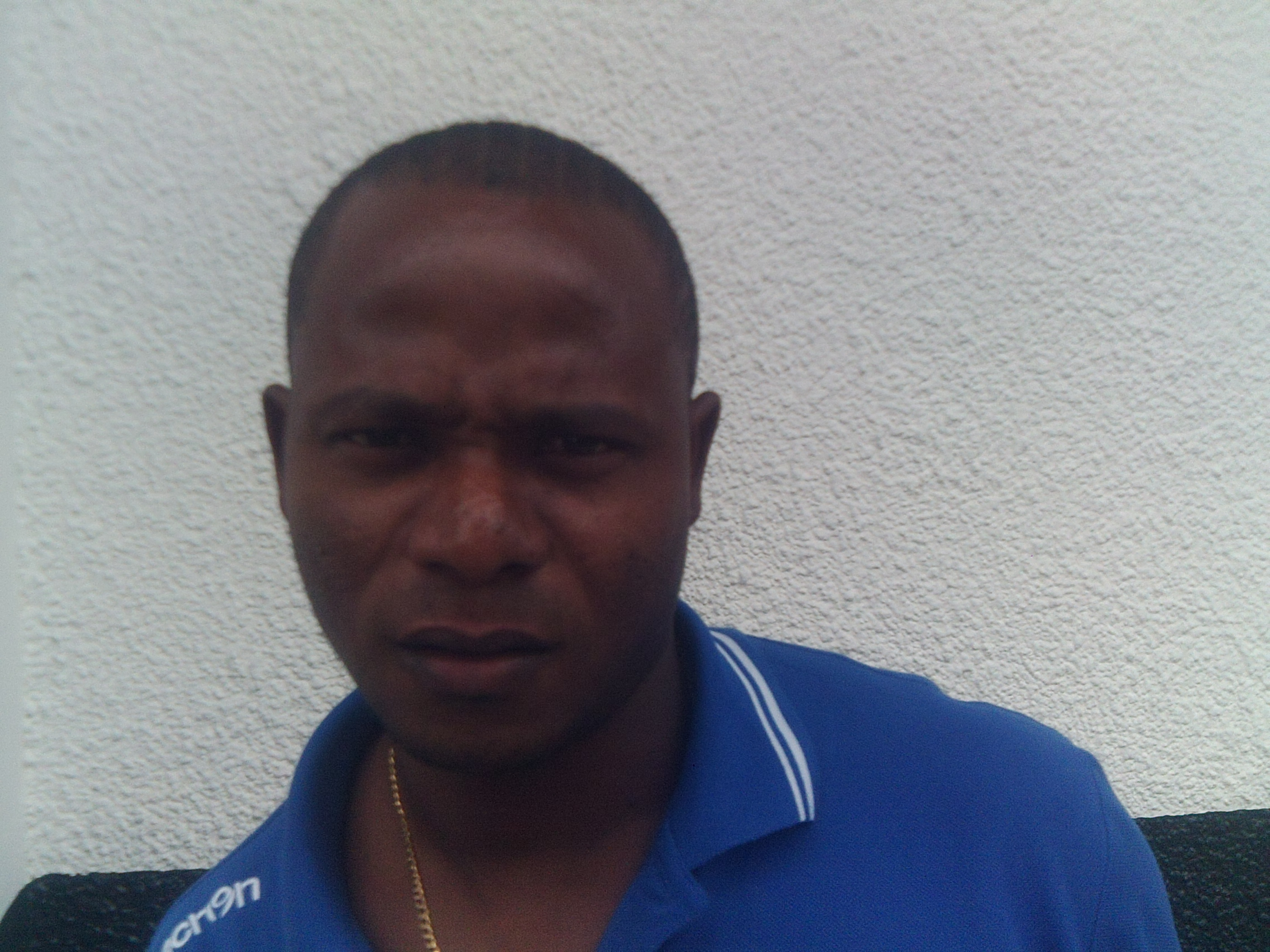

Personal information
- Full name: Jimmy Cundasamy
- Date of birth: July 14, 1977 (age 49)
- Place of birth: Mauritius
- Height: 5 ft 10 in (1.78 m)
- Position: Midfielder

Team information
- Current team: US Stade Tamponnaise
- Number: 14

Senior career*
Years	Team	Apps	(Gls)
1998–2002	FC Les Avirons		
2003–2004	SS Saint-Louisienne		
2005	JS Saint-Pierroise		
2006–	US Stade Tamponnaise		

International career
1997–2014	Mauritius	69	(4)
Medal record
Men's football
Representing Mauritius
Indian Ocean Island Games
Gold medal – first place	2003 Mauritius
Silver medal – second place	2011 Seychelles
- * Club domestic league appearances and goals

Jimmy Cundasamy (born July 14, 1977 in Mauritius) is a football player who currently plays for US Stade Tamponnaise in the Réunion Premier League and for the Mauritius national football team as a midfielder. He is featured on the Mauritian national team in the official 2010 FIFA World Cup video game.

== Honours ==
Mauritius

- Indian Ocean Island Games: Gold Medalist, 2003; Silver Medalist, 2011
