= Richard C. DiPrima Prize =

Mathematics award

The Richard C. DiPrima Prize is awarded every two years by the Society for Industrial and Applied Mathematics to an early career researcher who has done outstanding research in applied mathematics. First awarded in 1988, it honors the memory of Richard C. DiPrima, a former president of SIAM who also served for many years as a member of its council and board of trustees, as vice president for programs, and as a dedicated and committed member.

== Recipients ==
The recipients of the Richard C. DiPrima Prize are:

- 1988: Mary E. Brewster
- 1990: No award
- 1992: Anne Bourlioux
- 1992: Robin Carl Young
- 1994: Stephen Jonathan Chapman
- 1996: David Paul Williamson
- 1998: Bart De Schutter
- 2000: Keith Lindsay
- 2002: Gang Hu
- 2004: Diego Dominici
- 2006: Xinwei Yu
- 2008: Daan Huybrechs
- 2010: Colin B. Macdonald
- 2012: Thomas Goldstein
- 2014: Thomas D. Trogdon
- 2016: Blake H. Barker
- 2018: Peter Gangl
- 2020: Anna Seigal
- 2022: Matthew J. Colbrook
- 2024: John C. Urschel
- 2026: Fatih Dinc

== See also ==
- List of mathematics awards
