= Anne Bourlioux =

Canadian mathematician

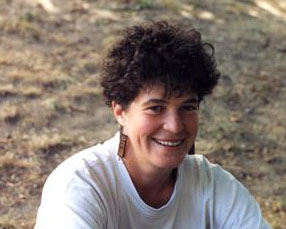
- Bourlioux in 1991
- Education: Princeton University
- Awards: 1992 Richard C. DiPrima Prize
- Scientific career
- Workplaces: Université de Montréal
- Thesis: Numerical Studies of Unstable Detonations (1991)
- Doctoral advisor: Andrew Majda
- Doctoral students: Boualem Khouider

Anne Bourlioux is a Canadian mathematician whose research involves the numerical simulation of turbulent combustion. She is a winner of the Richard C. DiPrima Prize, and a professor of mathematics and statistics at the Université de Montréal.

She is also a former rugby player for the Berkeley All Blues, and a Canadian national champion and world record holder in indoor rowing.

== Education ==
Bourlioux earned her Ph.D. in 1991 at Princeton University. Her dissertation, Numerical Studies of Unstable Detonations, was supervised by Andrew Majda. She was a Miller Research Fellow at the University of California, Berkeley from 1991 to 1993.

== Academic recognition ==
Bourlioux won the Richard C. DiPrima Prize in 1992. She was a keynote speaker at the 2006 Spring Technical Meeting of the Combustion Institute/Canadian Section, speaking on multiscale modeling of turbulent combustion.

== Selected publications ==
- Bourlioux, Anne; Majda, Andrew J. (1992-09-01). "Theoretical and numerical structure for unstable two-dimensional detonations". Combustion and Flame. 90 (3): 211–229. Bibcode:1992CoFl...90..211B. doi:10.1016/0010-2180(92)90084-3. ISSN 0010-2180.
- Bourlioux, Anne; Majda, Andrew J.; Roytburd, Victor (1991-04-01). "Theoretical and Numerical Structure for Unstable One-Dimensional Detonations". SIAM Journal on Applied Mathematics. 51 (2): 303–343. doi:10.1137/0151016. ISSN 0036-1399.
- Bourlioux, Anne; Layton, Anita T.; Minion, Michael L. (2003-08-10). "High-order multi-implicit spectral deferred correction methods for problems of reactive flow". Journal of Computational Physics. 189 (2): 651–675. Bibcode:2003JCoPh.189..651B. doi:10.1016/S0021-9991(03)00251-1. ISSN 0021-9991.
