= Majda's model =

Majda's model is a qualitative model (in mathematical physics) introduced by Andrew Majda in 1981 for the study of interactions in the combustion theory of shock waves and explosive chemical reactions.

The following definitions are with respect to a Cartesian coordinate system with 2 variables. For functions $u(x,t)$, $z(x,t)$ of one spatial variable $x$ representing the Lagrangian specification of the fluid flow field and the time variable $t$, functions $f(w)$, $\phi (w)$ of one variable $w$, and positive constants $k, q, B$, the Majda model is a pair of coupled partial differential equations:

$$\frac{\partial u(x,t)}{\partial t} + q \cdot \frac{\partial z(x,t)}{\partial t} + \frac{\partial f(u(x,t))}{\partial x} = B \cdot \frac{\partial^2u(x,t)}{\partial x^2}$$
$\frac{\partial z(x,t)}{\partial t} = - k \cdot \phi (u(x,t)) \cdot z(x,t)$

the unknown function $u = u(x,t)$ is a lumped variable, a scalar variable formed from a complicated nonlinear average of various aspects of density, velocity, and temperature in the exploding gas;
the unknown function $z = z(x,t) \in [0,1]$ is the mass fraction in a simple one-step chemical reaction scheme;
the given flux function $f = f(w)$ is a nonlinear convex function;
the given ignition function $\phi = \phi (w)$ is the starter for the chemical reaction scheme;
$k$ is the constant reaction rate;
$q$ is the constant heat release;
$B$ is the constant diffusivity.

Since its introduction in the early 1980s, Majda's simplified "qualitative" model for detonation ... has played an important role in the mathematical literature as test-bed for both the development of mathematical theory and computational techniques. Roughly, the model is a $2 \times 2$ system consisting of a Burgers' equation coupled to a chemical kinetics equation. For example, Majda (with Colella & Roytburd) used the model as a key diagnostic tool in the development of fractional-step computational schemes for the Navier-Stokes equations of compressible reacting fluids ...
