= Anna Seigal =

British mathematician

- Education: University of California, Berkeley
- Awards: SIAM Richard C. DiPrima Prize; Bernard Friedman Memorial Prize in Applied Mathematics
- Scientific career
- Fields: Mathematics
- Thesis: Structured Tensors and the Geometry of Data (2019)
- Doctoral advisor: Bernd Sturmfels
- Website: https://people.math.harvard.edu/~aseigal/

Anna Seigal is a British mathematician who conducts research in applied algebraic geometry at Harvard University and the University of Oxford. She was awarded the 2020 SIAM Richard C. DiPrima Prize and the Bernard Friedman Memorial Prize in Applied Mathematics.

== Education and career ==
Seigal earned her bachelor's degree (BA honors) from Emmanuel College, University of Cambridge in 2013, scoring 1st class, top 10 in the Mathematical Tripos. She earned her master's degree (MMath, 2014) there earning an honours pass with distinction on Part III of the Mathematical Tripos. Her Master's essay, Iwasawa Theory of Elliptic Curves with Complex Multiplication, was supervised by John H. Coates.

Seigal earned her PhD in Mathematics from UC Berkeley in 2019. Her dissertation, Structured Tensors and the Geometry of Data, was supervised by Bernd Sturmfels. It investigates the algebraic theory of tensors and algorithms for tensor data. At University of Oxford she is a Junior Research Fellow in The Queen's College and Hooke Research Fellow in the Mathematical Institute.

== Awards and honors ==
She was awarded the 2020 SIAM Richard C. DiPrima Prize and the Bernard Friedman Memorial Prize in Applied Mathematics.
