= Akbar Patel =

Mauritian football coach

Akbar Patel is a Mauritian football coach who manages the national side, a job he took up for the fourth time in October 2018.

== Career ==
Patel led the Mauritian national side to the 2003 Indian Ocean Games title. Patel was also appointed caretaker manager of the national side in August 2007, before being appointed as full manager in March 2009. He returned to the national side in October 2018 for the fourth time.
