= Mohammad Anwar Elahee =

Mauritian footballer and manager

Mohammad Anwar Elahee MBE
Personal information
- Full name: Mohammad Anwar Elahee
- Date of birth: 9 July 1929
- Place of birth: Port Louis, Mauritius
- Date of death: 26 November 2010 (aged 81)
- Place of death: Port Louis, Mauritius
- Position: Defender

Senior career*
Years	Team	Apps	(Gls)
1945–1947	Royal Muslims	?	(?)
1947–1959	Muslim Scouts	?	(?)
1960–1963	Sharks	?	(?)

International career
1951–1956	Mauritius	?	(?)

Managerial career
- 1960–1976: Muslim Scouts
- 1970–1988: Mauritius
- 1989: Sunrise Flacq United
- 1990–1993: Scouts Club
- 1994–1996: Mauritius
- * Club domestic league appearances and goals

Mohammad Anwar Elahee MBE (9 July 1929 – 26 November 2010) was a Mauritian football player and manager who coached the Mauritian national team at the 1974 African Cup of Nations and the 1985 Indian Ocean Games.

He was appointed Member of the Order of the British Empire (MBE) in the 1970 New Year Honours for services to sport.

His son Mohammad Anwar Elahee, Jr. is active with the Mauritius Football Association.
