= Christopher Perle =

Mauritian footballer

Personal information
- Date of birth: 17 December 1974 (age 51)
- Place of birth: Mauritius
- Position: Forward

Senior career*
Years	Team	Apps	(Gls)
1991–1995	Maurice Espoir Moka		
1995–1998	Sunrise Flacq United		
1998–2001	SC Paderborn	14	(0)
2002	Olympique de Moka		
2003–2004	La Passe FC		
2005	US Stade Tamponnaise		
2006	SS Jeanne d'Arc		
2007–2010	Curepipe Starlight SC		

International career
1995–2007	Mauritius	51	(11)
Medal record
Men's football
Representing Mauritius
Indian Ocean Island Games
Gold medal – first place	2003 Mauritius
- * Club domestic league appearances and goals

Christopher Perle (born 17 December 1974) is a former footballer who played as a forward. He represented the Mauritius national team at international level, scoring 11 goals.

== Career ==
Perle played abroad with SC Paderborn (Germany), La Passe FC (Seychelles), US Stade Tamponnaise and SS Jeanne d'Arc. For the Mauritius national team, he made 51 appearances scoring 11 goals.

=== International ===
Appearances and goals by national team and year
National team	Year	Apps	Goals
Mauritius	1993	0	0
Mauritius	1995	1	0
Mauritius	1996	4	0
Mauritius	1997	3	0
Mauritius	1998	5	1
Mauritius	1999	6	3
Mauritius	2000	8	1
Mauritius	2001	6	0
Mauritius	2003	8	4
Mauritius	2004	2	1
Mauritius	2005	3	0
Mauritius	2006	1	0
Mauritius	2007	2	1
Total		51	11

Scores and results list Mauritius' goal tally first, score column indicates score after each Perle goal.

List of international goals scored by Christopher Perle
No.	Date	Venue	Opponent	Score	Result	Competition	Ref.
1	23 August 1998	Stade George V, Curepipe, Mauritius	Lesotho	2-0	3-1	2000 African Cup of Nations qualification	
2	28 February 1999	Estádio da Cidadela, Luanda, Angola	Angola	1-0	2-0	2000 African Cup of Nations qualification	
3	10 April 1999	Stade George V, Curepipe, Mauritius	Angola	1-1	1-1	2000 African Cup of Nations qualification	
4	20 June 1999	Stade Paulo-Brabant, Les Avirons, Réunion	Gabon	2-2	2-2	2000 African Cup of Nations qualification	
5	16 July 2000	Stade George V, Curepipe, Mauritius	Tanzania	3-2	3-2	2002 African Cup of Nations qualification	
6	6 July 2003	Mahamasina Municipal Stadium, Antananarivo, Madagascar	Madagascar	1-0	2-0	2004 African Cup of Nations qualification	
7	30 August 2003	Stade George V, Curepipe, Mauritius	Madagascar	2-0	3-1	2003 Indian Ocean Island Games	
8	4 September 2003	Stade George V, Curepipe, Mauritius	Comoros	1-0	5-0	Indian Ocean Island Games	
9	4 September 2003	Stade George V, Curepipe, Mauritius	Comoros	5-0	5-0	Indian Ocean Island Games	
10	10 January 2004	Stade George V, Curepipe, Mauritius	South Africa	2-0	2-0	2004 COSAFA Cup	
11	9 September 2007	Stade George V, Curepipe, Mauritius	Seychelles	1-1	1-1	2008 Africa Cup of Nations qualification	

== Honours ==
Mauritius

- Indian Ocean Island Games: Gold Medalist, 2003
