= Richard DiPrima =

American fluid dynamicist (1927 – 1984)

Richard Clyde DiPrima (1927 to 1984) was a professor of applied mechanics at Rensselaer Polytechnic Institute, specializing in hydrodynamic stability and lubrication theory.

DiPrima studied at Carnegie Mellon University attaining B.A. M.S. and Ph.D. there. He wrote his thesis under George H. Handelman.

He continued his studies, first at MIT with C. C. Lin, and then for two years at Harvard with Bernard Budiansky and George Carrier. In Boston he married Maureen. DiPrima was employed at Hughes Aircraft for a year in their laboratory.

Rensselaer Polytechnic Institute acquired his services in 1957; he was promoted to associate professor in 1959. He was made a full professor in 1962. From 1972 to 1981 he served as chair of the department of mathematical sciences. He joined William E. Boyce to write Elementary Differential Equations and Boundary Value Problems, a textbook that is now in its eleventh edition.

DiPrima was a fellow of the American Society of Mechanical Engineers, the American Academy of Mechanics, and of the American Physical Society. He was a member of the American Mathematical Society, the Mathematical Association of America, and of the Society for Industrial and Applied Mathematics.

In administrative service, he served as president of SIAM, and as chair of the executive committee of the Applied Mechanics Division of ASME.

DiPrima was a Fulbright fellow in 1964 and 1983, and had a Guggenheim Fellowship in 1982. He received the W.H. Wiley distinguished faculty award in 1980 from Rensselaer. In 1988 SIAM began awarding the Richard C. DiPrima Prize every two years.

DiPrima died on September 10, 1984. One year later a conference dedicated to the memory of DiPrima was held at Rensselaer, and the Proceedings published.

== Selected works ==
- 1966: (with R. Soni) "The convergence of the Galerkin method for the Taylor–Dean stability problem", Quarterly of Applied Mathematics 23(4): 183.
- 1969 (with G. J. Hobitler) "A completeness theorem for non-self-adjoint eigenvalue problems in hydrodynamic stability", Archive for Rational Mechanics and Analysis
- 1970: (with S. Kogelman) "Stability of spatially periodic supercritical flows in hydrodynamics", Physics of Fluids 13: 1–11
- 1978: (with J. Trevor Stuart) "The Eckhaus and Benjamin-Feir Resonance Mechanisms", Proceedings of the Royal Society A 362: 27, issue 1708, Bibcode:1978RSPSA.362...27S S2CID 119822941
- 2006: (with P.M.Eagles & Trevor Stuart) "The effects of eccentricity on torque and load in Taylor-vortex flow", Journal of Fluid Mechanics 87(2): 209 doi:10.1017/S002211207800155X S2CID 122036724
