= Mauritius national football team =

Mauritius
- Nickname(s): Club M Les Dodos (The Dodos)
- Association: Mauritius Football Association (MFA) (Lasosiasion foutborl Moris)
- Confederation: CAF (Africa)
- Sub-confederation: COSAFA (Southern Africa)
- Head coach: Rui Pedro & Daniel Ramsamy
- Captain: Kevin Jean-Louis
- Most caps: Henri Speville (72)
- Top scorer: Daniel Imbert (17)
- Home stadium: Complexe Sportif de Côte d'Or
- FIFA code: MRI
First colours	Second colours

FIFA ranking
- Current: 179 (18 November 2026)
- Highest: 112 (December 1992)
- Lowest: 203 (November 2012)

First international
- Mauritius 16–1 Réunion (Madagascar; Date Unknown 1947)

Biggest win
- Mauritius 16–1 Réunion (Madagascar; Date Unknown 1947)

Biggest defeat
- Egypt 7–0 Mauritius (Port Said, Egypt; 8 June 2003); Seychelles 7–0 Mauritius (Witbank, South Africa; 19 July 2008); Senegal 7–0 Mauritius (Dakar, Senegal; 9 October 2010)

Africa Cup of Nations
- Appearances: 1 (first in 1974)
- Best result: Group stage (1974)

COSAFA Cup
- Appearances: 16 (first in 2000)
- Best result: Quarter-finals (2001, 2004)
Medal record
Men's football
Indian Ocean Island Games
Gold medal – first place	1985 Mauritius
Gold medal – first place	2003 Mauritius
Silver medal – second place	1990 Madagascar
Silver medal – second place	2011 Seychelles
Silver medal – second place	2019 Mauritius
Bronze medal – third place	1993 Seychelles
Bronze medal – third place	2015 Reunion
Bronze medal – third place	2023 Madagascar

The Mauritius national football team (Morisyen: Lekip nasional foutborl Moris), nicknamed Club M and Les Dodos (The Dodos), is the national team of Mauritius. They are overseen by the Mauritius Football Association, which is a member of FIFA, the Confederation of African Football (CAF), and the Council of Southern Africa Football Associations (COSAFA).

Their most significant achievements are qualification for the 1974 African Cup of Nations, and winning the Indian Ocean Island Games football tournament in 1985 and 2003. They have also been a finalist in this competition in 1990, 2011 and 2019.

== History ==
=== Early years ===
Mauritius played its first competitive international game in 1947 against Réunion, which they won 2–1. For the next twenty years, they would only play Réunion and Madagascar (probably due to the proximity of the three islands to each other) in friendlies and the Indian Ocean Games Triangulaire, which existed from 1947 to 1963. Mauritius won the competition ten times over that time period, were runners-up twice, and came in third once.

=== 1960s–1990s ===
Starting in 1967, Mauritius began competing against other countries, playing friendlies and entering in such competitions as the Africa Cup of Nations and the FIFA World Cup qualifiers, though they haven't found much success. While they have never qualified for the World Cup finals, they have qualified once for the Africa Cup of Nations, in 1974, however, they were eliminated in the group stages. Mauritius did manage to win the resurrected Indian Ocean Games in 1985. In 1999, after deadly riots caused by supporters of Scouts Club (renamed as Port Louis Sporting Club) angry about a controversial penalty awarded to Fire Brigade Sports Club (now renamed as Pamplemousses SC) in the championship deciding game, which gave Fire Brigade a 1–0 win, all domestic football was suspended for 18 months, and only the national team was allowed to play. This is regarded as the point at which Mauritian football, both on the domestic and international stage, started on a downward slope.

=== 2000s–present ===
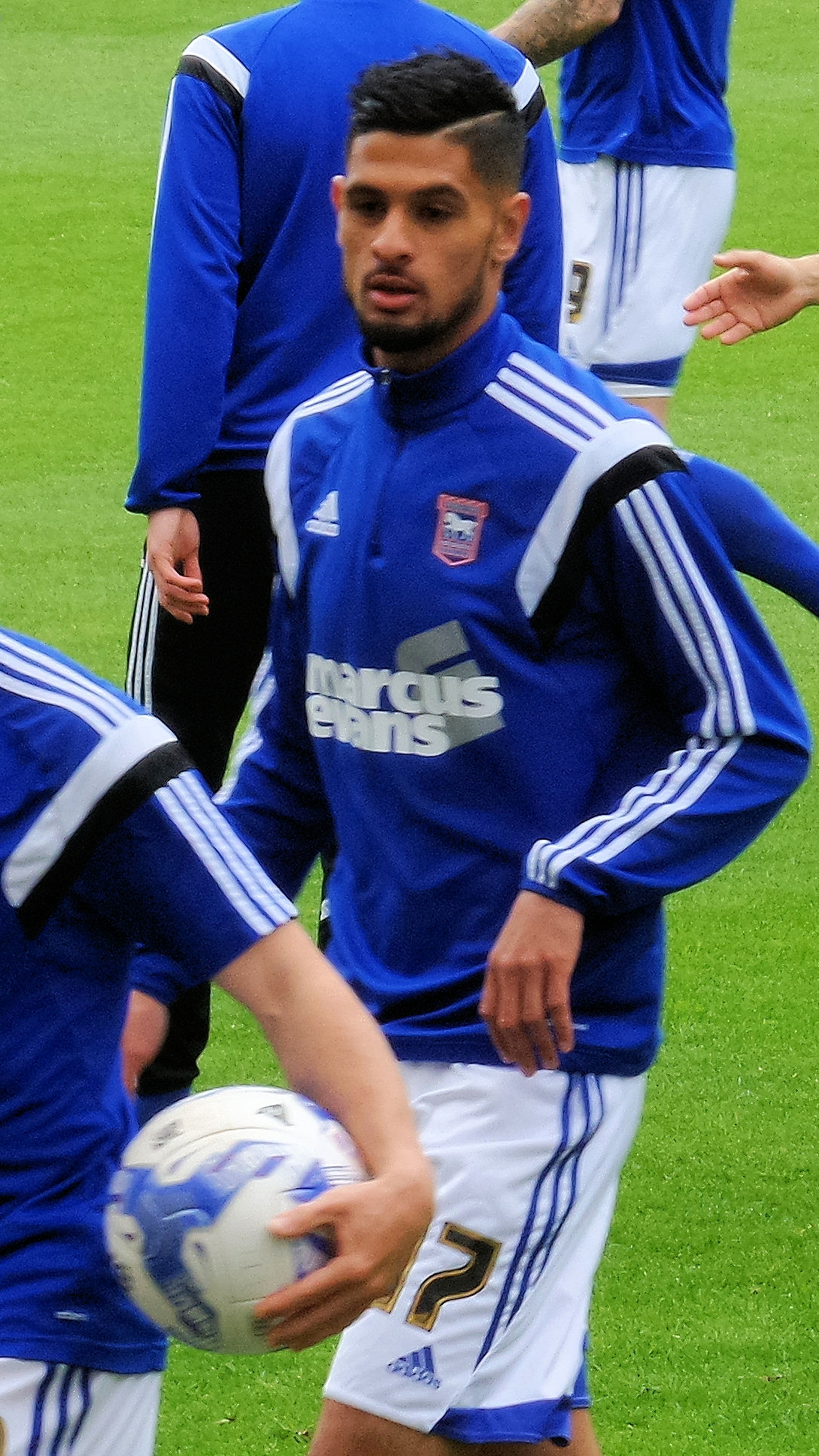
Kévin Bru made his debut for Mauritius in 2011

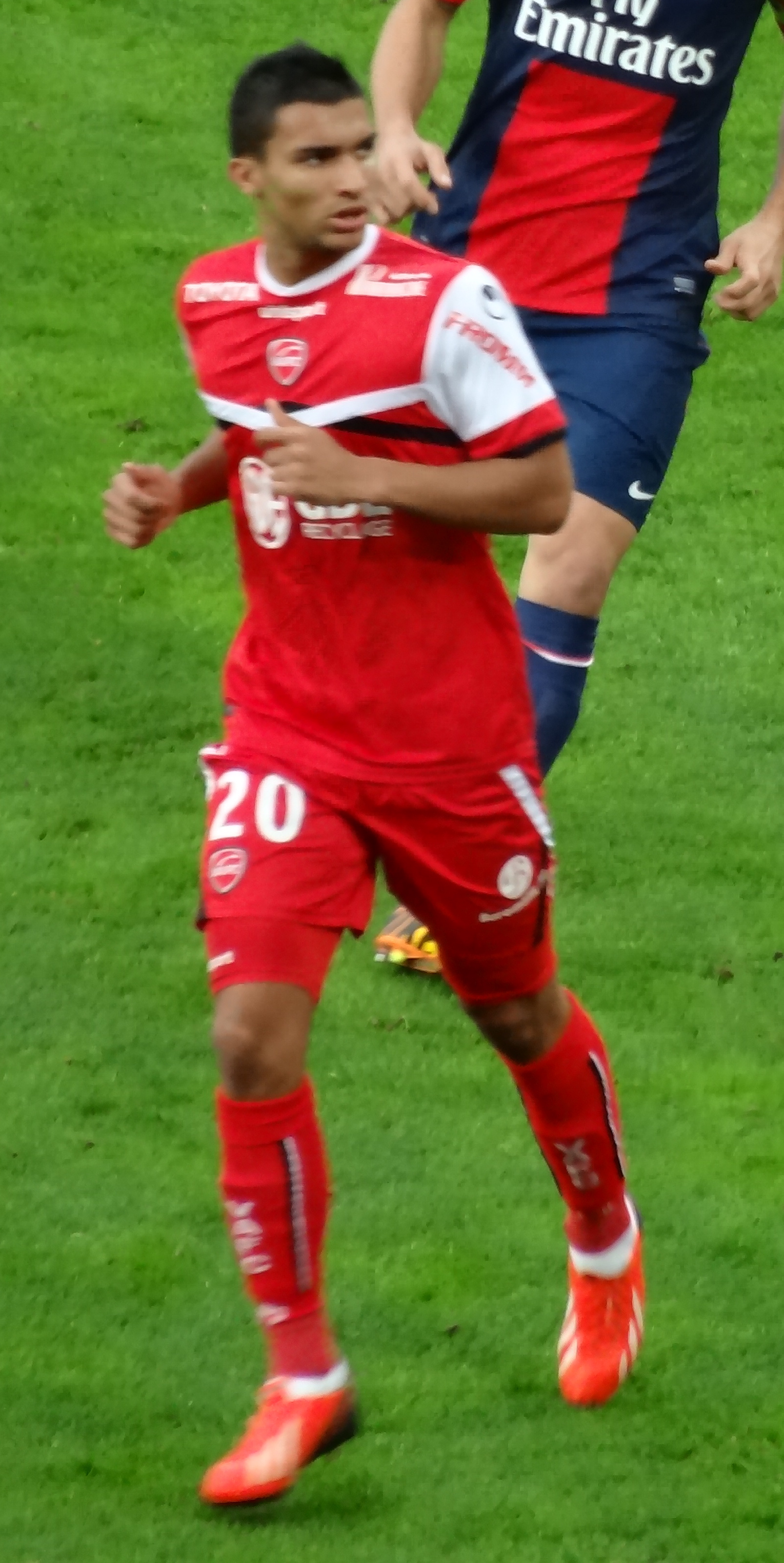
Lindsay Rose made his debut for Mauritius in 2018

Throughout the new millennium, the national team's performances progressively declined. From a high of the 116th place in the FIFA rankings in 2000, they tumbled down to an all-time low of the 195th place in the summer of 2011.

A peak was reached in 2003, when Mauritius convincingly won the 2003 Indian Ocean Island Games, on home soil, under head coach Akbar Patel. They followed up with a 3-1 home win over Uganda in the 2006 FIFA World Cup Qualification (CAF) first round in November 2003, although Uganda progressed on aggregate. Mauritius then reached the quarterfinals of the 2004 COSAFA Cup, beating South Africa 2–0 in January 2004. Mauritius eventually lost out 3–1 to the tournament's favorites Zambia. In the next few years, the team would go through a slump in performance, suffering their biggest defeats in the process and recording few official wins. Mauritius have also cycled through many head coaches, especially since the new millennium, but none have had true success.

During the 2017 African Cup of Nations qualifiers, Les Dodos achieved their best results in a decade, defeating both Mozambique and Rwanda. However, they were unable to build on these wins, losing to Comoros and then São Tomé and Príncipe in the preliminary round of the next two editions. In the 2023 AFCoN qualifiers, Mauritius faced São Tomé again in the preliminary round and lost 1–0 in the first leg and drew 3–3 at home, failing to progress. Following the result, CAF ruled that one of the São Tomé players was not eligible, awarding Mauritius a 3–0 victory and sending them into the group stages for the first time since 2017. However, this decision was reversed, following an appeal by São Tomé.

In 2023, Mauritius recorded impressive wins vs Kenya (1-0), who were in the FIFA rankings' top 100, and Angola (1-0; 0-0). However, in the 2025 AFCoN qualifiers, Mauritius lost to Chad in the preliminary round, marking four consecutive unsuccessful attempts to reach the group stage of the qualification round.

== Team image ==
=== Media coverage ===
For most home games of significant importance, the Mauritius Broadcasting Corporation provides televised coverage.

=== Kit providers ===
Kit provider	Period
(Germany) Puma	1985–1998
(Mauritius) Allsports	1998–2003
(United States) Nike	2003–2006
(Mauritius) Allsports	2006–2009
(Germany) Adidas	2009–2017
(Spain) Joma	2017–2019
(Germany) Adidas	2019–2022
(Italy) Macron	2022–2023
(India) Nivia	2023–Present

=== Supporters' groups ===
On 30 May 2011, the official fan club of Club M, Kop Moris, was launched. it was a massive moment for the entire country of Mauritius. The objective of this club is to build up excitement for Mauritius' games, fill up the stands as much as possible, and create a festive and family-friendly atmosphere. This fan club is officially sanctioned by the MFA.

== Stadium ==
Mauritius now plays the majority of its games at the modern Complexe Sportif de Côte d'Or (cap. 7,000). Matches were previously hosted at Stade Anjalay (cap. 18,000) for high-profile matches, and Stade George V (cap. 6,200).

== Results and fixtures ==
The following is a list of match results in the last 12 months, as well as any future matches that have been scheduled.

Win Draw Loss Fixture

=== 2026 ===
27 March 2027 Africa Cup of Nations qualification, 1st round	Somalia	0–0	Mauritius	Maputo, Mozambique
15:00 UTC+2		Report		Stadium: Arena Lalgy Tchumene; Referee: Kouassi Biro (Ivory Coast)

31 March 2027 Africa Cup of Nations qualification, 1st round	Mauritius	0–0 (2–4 p)	Somalia	Saint Pierre, Mauritius
19:00 UTC+4		Report		Stadium: Côte d'Or National Sports Complex; Referee: Ali Brahamou Sadou (Niger)
	Penalties
	Rose (penalty scored); Alizart (penalty missed); Ferré (penalty scored); Perticots (penalty missed)		Awad (penalty scored); Akram (penalty scored); Shariif (penalty scored); Cabdi (penalty scored)

8 June Sikelia Cup	Sicily	1–2	Mauritius	Terrasini, Italy
18:00 UTC+2	Maltese 12'	Report	Aristide 4'; Antoine 91' (pen.)	Stadium: Stadio Salvatore Favazza

2 October Friendly	Mauritius	3–0	Sri Lanka	Saint Pierre, Mauritius
19:00 UTC+4	De Robillard 28' (pen.); W. François 33'; A. François 59'	Report		Stadium: Côte d'Or National Sports Complex

5 October Friendly	Sri Lanka	3–2	Mauritius	Saint Pierre, Mauritius
17:30 UTC+5:30	Bharath 20'; Senthurvasan 40'; Durrant 70'	Report	de Robillard 7'; Francois 83'	Stadium: Côte d'Or National Sports Complex

== Staff ==
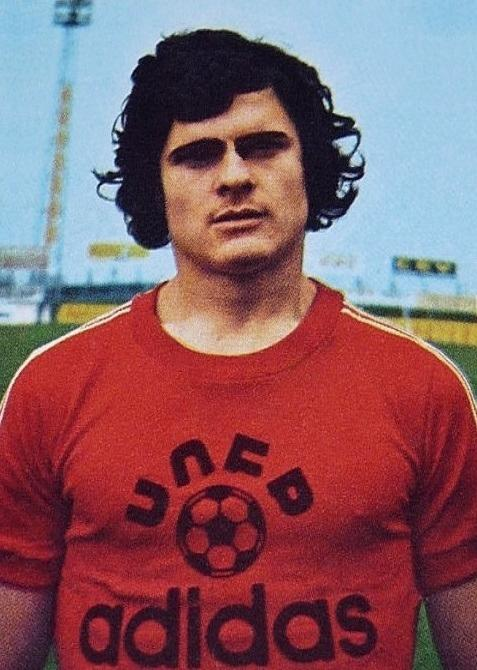
Didier Six became the manager of the Mauritius national football team in 2015

=== Current staff ===
Position	Name
Head coaches	(Portugal) Rui Pedro & (Mauritius) Daniel Ramsamy
Assistant Coach	(Mauritius) Sanjay Ramchurn
Assistant coach	(Mauritius) Oliver Dufresne
Fitness Coach	(Mauritius) Sameer Chattarjee
Goalkeeper Coach	(Mauritius) Karan Jadhav
Match Analyst	(Mauritius) Manoj Desai
Doctors	(Mauritius) Pradeep Menon (Mauritius) Ashok Puran
Physiotherapists	(Mauritius) Jonas Gosselin (Mauritius) Neelesh Singh (Mauritius) Amit Pillay (Mauritius) Suresh Sharma
Team Coordinator	(Mauritius) Jonathan Bru
Technical Director	(Mauritius) Akbar Patel

=== Managerial history ===
- (England) Harry Brophy (1957–59)
- (Mauritius) Joseph Le Roy (1959–63)
- (Scotland) Danny McLennan (1963–64)
- (Mauritius) Mohammad Anwar Elahee (1970–88)
- (Germany) Helmut Kosmehl (1976–88)
- (Germany) Rudi Gutendorf (1993)
- (Mauritius) Mohammad Anwar Elahee (1994–96)
- (Mauritius) Akbar Patel (1996-97)
- (Germany) Rudi Gutendorf (1997)
- (Mauritius) Ashok Chundunsing (1998)
- (Mauritius) Rajen Dorasami & (Mauritius) France L'Aiguille (1998–02)
- (France) Patrick Parizon (2002–03)
- (Mauritius) Akbar Patel & (Mauritius) Saoud Lallmahomed (2003)
- (Mauritius) Elvis Antoine & (Mauritius) Rajesh Gunesh (2003–05)
- (Mauritius) Sarjoo Gowreesunkur (2006)
- (Mauritius) Rajen Dorasami & (Mauritius) France L'Aiguille (2006)
- (Mauritius) Akbar Patel (2007)
- (Mauritius) Ashok Chundunsing (2007–08)
- (Mauritius) Benjamin Théodore (2008–09)
- (Mauritius) Akbar Patel (2009–14)
- (France) Didier Six (2015)
- (France) Alain Happe (2015–16)
- (Belgium) Joe Tshupula (2016–17)
- (Brazil) Francisco Filho (2017–18)
- (Mauritius) Akbar Patel (2018–19)
- (Algeria) Boualem Mankour (2020–2021)
- (Mauritius) Tony François (2021–2023)
- (Madagascar) Fidy Rasoanaivo (2023–2024)
- (France) Guillaume Moullec (2024–2026)
- (Portugal) Rui Pedro & (Mauritius) Daniel Ramsamy (2026–present)

== Players ==
=== Current squad ===
The following players were selected for the 2027 Africa Cup of Nations qualification preliminary round matches against Somalia on 27 and 31 March 2026.

Caps and goals as of 13 October 2025, after the game against Libya.

No.	Pos.	Player	Date of birth (age)	Caps	Goals	Club
	GK	Kevin Jean-Louis	27 June 1989 (age 37)	59	0	(Mauritius Football Association) Pamplemousses
	GK	Dorian Chiotti	16 August 1998 (age 28)	13	0	(French Football Federation) Blois Football 41
	GK	Christopher James Caserne	22 February 1993 (age 33)	4	0	(Mauritius Football Association) Beau Bassin-Rose Hill
	DF	Emmanuel Vincent	27 August 1997 (age 29)	33	1	(Ligue réunionnaise de football) Saint-Denis
	DF	Wilson Mootoo	8 April 2002 (age 24)	25	0	Free agent
	DF	Lindsay Rose	8 February 1992 (age 34)	24	2	(Romanian Football Federation) Sepsi OSK
	DF	Jordan François	5 May 2002 (age 24)	17	0	Unknown
	DF	Brandon Citorah	9 January 1994 (age 32)	7	0	(Mauritius Football Association) Cercle de Joachim
	DF	Rosario Latouchent	21 March 1996 (age 30)	6	0	(French Football Federation) Bourges Foot 18
	DF	Bradley Antoine	6 April 2003 (age 23)	4	0	Unknown
	MF	Kévin Bru	December 12, 1988 (age 37)	31	3	Free agent
	MF	Adel Langue	17 September 1997 (age 29)	30	0	(Ligue réunionnaise de football) Saint-Louisienne
	MF	Adrien Botlar	19 September 1996 (age 30)	23	0	(Mauritius Football Association) Pamplemousses
	MF	Gabriel Caliste	18 November 2006 (age 20)	6	0	(The Football Association) West Ham United
	MF	William François	2 December 2004 (age 21)	3	1	Free agent
	MF	Kentiss Bhugeerathee	March 21, 2001 (age 25)	0	0	(Mauritius Football Association) Pamplemousses
	FW	Kevin Perticots	1 May 1996 (age 30)	43	6	Unknown
	FW	Adrien François	26 August 1999 (age 27)	20	3	Unknown
	FW	Ashley Nazira	11 November 1995 (age 31)	19	9	(Mauritius Football Association) Pamplemousses
	FW	Jason Ferré	20 November 1998 (age 28)	13	2	(Mauritius Football Association) Cercle de Joachim
	FW	Fernando Jackson	11 March 1999 (age 27)	12	0	Unknown
	FW	Linley Rita	4 February 1994 (age 32)	5	0	(Mauritius Football Association) Cercle de Joachim
	FW	Leon Alizart	25 March 2007 (age 19)	2	0	(Football Australia) Avondale

=== Recent call-ups ===
The following players have also been called up to the Mauritius squad within the last twelve months.

Pos.	Player	Date of birth (age)	Caps	Goals	Club	Latest call-up
GK	Jininio Darbon	7 November 2003 (age 23)	0	0	(Mauritius) Cercle de Joachim	v. Libya, 13 October 2025
DF	Dylan Collard	16 April 2000 (age 26)	16	1	(Portugal) Lusitânia	v. Libya, 13 October 2025
	Raphaël Augustin	*Unknown* (age 16)	0	0	Unknown Homegrown	v. Sri Lanka, 4 October 2026
MF	Jérémy Villeneuve	25 April 1994 (age 32)	26	2	Free agent	v. Libya, 13 October 2025
MF	Yannick Aristide	15 March 2001 (age 25)	23	1	(Mauritius) Cercle de Joachim	v. Libya, 13 October 2025
MF	Fabrice Brasse	15 July 1996 (age 30)	10	0	(Mauritius) GRSE Wanderers	v. Libya, 13 October 2025
MF	Pascal Colin	7 April 1996 (age 30)	8	0	(Mauritius) Cercle de Joachim	v. Libya, 13 October 2025
MF	Angel Arthée	13 March 2003 (age 23)	4	0	(Germany) FC Eddersheim	v. Libya, 13 October 2025
FW	Cooper Legrand	30 December 1998 (age 27)	7	0	(Australia) Langwarrin	v. Libya, 13 October 2025

== Player records ==
As of 3 September 2024
Players in bold are still active with Mauritius.

=== Most appearances ===
Rank	Player	Caps	Goals	Career
1	Henri Speville	72	1	1995–2007
2	Jimmy Cundasamy	69	4	1997–2014
3	Jean Gilbert Bayaram	64	1	1995–2008
4	**Kevin Jean-Louis**	63	0	2009–present
5	Andy Sophie	57	11	2007–2022
6	Daniel Imbert	53	17	1972–1983
7	**Emmanuel Vincent**	52	1	2015–present
8	Jean-Marc Ithier	50	11	1988–2003
8	Christopher Perle	50	11	1995–2007
8	Francis Rasolofonirina	50	2	2015–2023

=== Top goalscorers ===
Rank	Player	Goals	Caps	Ratio	Career
1	Daniel Imbert	17	53	0.32	1972–1983
2	Jean-Yves L'Enflé	15	29	0.52	1976–1984
3	Regis Jean	13	–	–	1947–1955
3	Roland Desvaux de Marigny	13	–	–	1949–1955
5	France Martin	12	–	–	1947–1950
5	Doona Raman	12	–	–	1953–1957
7	**Ashley Nazira**	11	33	0.33	2015–present
7	Kersley Appou	11	46	0.24	1993–2014
7	Jean-Marc Ithier	11	50	0.22	1988–2003
7	Christopher Perle	11	50	0.22	1995–2007
7	Andy Sophie	11	57	0.19	2007–2022

== Competitive record ==
=== FIFA World Cup ===
FIFA World Cup									Qualification					
Year	Round	Position	Pld	W	D	L	GF	GA	Pld	W	D	L	GF	GA
1930 to 1950	Part of United Kingdom								Part of United Kingdom					
1954 to 1962	Not a FIFA member								Not a FIFA member					
1966 and 1970	Did not enter								Did not enter					
(West Germany) 1974	Did not qualify								2	0	1	1	3	5
1978 and 1982	Did not enter								Did not enter					
(Mexico) 1986	Did not qualify								2	0	0	2	0	5
(Italy) 1990	Banned by FIFA								Banned by FIFA					
(United States) 1994	Did not enter								Did not enter					
(France) 1998	Did not qualify								2	0	0	2	1	7
(South Korea) (Japan) 2002	Did not qualify								2	0	0	2	2	6
(Germany) 2006	Did not qualify								2	1	0	1	3	4
(South Africa) 2010	Did not qualify								6	0	1	5	3	17
(Brazil) 2014	Withdrew during qualifying								Withdrew during qualifying					
(Russia) 2018	Did not qualify								2	0	1	1	2	5
(Qatar) 2022	Did not qualify								2	0	0	2	0	3
(Canada) (Mexico) (United States) 2026	Did not qualify								10	1	3	6	7	17
(Morocco) (Portugal) (Spain) 2030	To be determined								To be determined					
(Saudi Arabia) 2034	To be determined								To be determined					
Total		0/15							30	2	6	22	21	69

=== Africa Cup of Nations ===
Africa Cup of Nations record
Year	Round	Position	Pld	W	D*	L	GF	GA
(Sudan) 1957	Not affiliated to CAF							
(United Arab Republic) 1959	Not affiliated to CAF							
(Ethiopia) 1962	Not affiliated to CAF							
(Ghana) 1963	Not affiliated to CAF							
(Tunisia) 1965	Not affiliated to CAF							
(Ethiopia) 1968	Did not qualify							
(Sudan) 1970	Did not qualify							
(Cameroon) 1972	Did not qualify							
(Egypt) 1974	Group stage	8th	3	0	0	3	2	8
(Ethiopia) 1976	Did not qualify							
(Nigeria) 1980	Did not qualify							
(Libya) 1982	Did not qualify							
(Ivory Coast) 1984	Did not qualify							
(Egypt) 1986	Did not qualify							
(Morocco) 1988	Withdrew							
(Algeria) 1990	Did not qualify							
(Senegal) 1992	Did not qualify							
(Tunisia) 1994	Did not qualify							
(South Africa) 1996	Did not qualify							
(Burkina Faso) 1998	Did not qualify							
(Ghana) (Nigeria) 2000	Did not qualify							
(Mali) 2002	Did not qualify							
(Tunisia) 2004	Did not qualify							
(Egypt) 2006	Did not qualify							
(Ghana) 2008	Did not qualify							
(Angola) 2010	Did not qualify							
(Equatorial Guinea) (Gabon) 2012	Did not qualify							
(South Africa) 2013	Did not enter							
(Equatorial Guinea) 2015	Did not qualify							
(Gabon) 2017	Did not qualify							
(Egypt) 2019	Did not qualify							
(Cameroon) 2021	Did not qualify							
(Ivory Coast) 2023	Did not qualify							
(Morocco) 2025	Did not qualify							
(Kenya) (Tanzania) (Uganda) 2027	Did not qualify							
2028	To be determined							
Total	Round 1	1/35	3	0	0	3	2	8

=== COSAFA Senior Challenge Cup ===
COSAFA Cup record
Year	Round	Position	Pld	W	D*	L	GF	GA
1997 to 1999	Did not enter							
2000	First round		1	0	0	1	0	3
2001	Quarter-final		2	1	0	1	1	1
2002	First round		1	0	0	1	2	3
2003	First round		1	0	0	1	1	2
2004	Quarter-final		2	1	0	1	3	3
2005	First round		2	1	0	1	2	1
2006	First round		1	0	0	1	5	1
2007	First round		2	0	1	1	0	2
(South Africa) 2008	Group stage		3	0	1	2	2	10
(Zimbabwe) 2009	Group stage		2	0	0	2	0	4
2010	Cancelled							
(Zambia) 2013	Group stage		2	1	0	1	5	2
(South Africa) 2015	Group stage		3	1	0	2	1	4
(South Africa) 2016	Group stage		3	1	0	2	2	4
(South Africa) 2017	Group stage		3	0	2	1	1	2
(South Africa) 2018	Group stage		3	0	2	1	1	2
(South Africa) 2019	Group stage		2	0	1	1	3	4
(South Africa) 2020	Cancelled							
(South Africa) 2021	Did not enter							
(South Africa) 2022	Group stage		3	0	0	3	1	7
(South Africa) 2023	Group stage		3	1	0	2	1	3
(South Africa) 2024	Did not enter							
(South Africa) 2025	Group stage		3	0	3	0	0	0
Total	Quarter-final	19/24	42	7	10	25	31	58

=== African Nations Championship ===
African Nations Championship record
Year	Round	Position	Pld	W	D	L	GF	GA
(Ivory Coast) 2009	Withdrew							
(Sudan) 2011	Did not enter							
(South Africa) 2014	Did not qualify							
(Rwanda) 2016	Did not qualify							
(Morocco) 2018	Did not qualify							
(Cameroon) 2020	Did not qualify							
(Algeria) 2022	Did not qualify							
(Kenya) (Uganda) (Tanzania) 2024	Did not qualify							
Appearances: 0

== Head-to-head record ==
As of 5 October 2026 after the match vs. Sri Lanka

Opponent	Played	Won	Drew	Lost	GF	GA	GD	Last Played	Best Result
Angola	10	2	2	6	6	14	−8	9 September 2025	Angola 0–2 Mauritius (Angola; 28 February 1999)
Burundi	1	0	1	0	2	2	0	25 March 2015	Mauritius 2–2 Burundi (Mauritius; 25 March 2015)
Botswana	3	1	1	1	1	6	–5	1 June 2018	Botswana 0–1 Mauritius (Botswana; 1 June 2018)
Cameroon	6	0	0	6	1	21	−20	8 October 2025	Mauritius 1–3 Cameroon (Mauritius; 4 September 2010)
Chad	2	0	0	2	1	3	−2	26 March 2024	
Cape Verde	4	0	0	4	1	7	−6	4 September 2025	Mauritius 0–2 Cape Verde (Mauritius; 4 September 2025)
Comoros	9	7	1	1	23	3	+20	29 May 2019	Mauritius 5–0 Comoros (Mauritius; 4 September 2003)
Congo	3	0	1	2	1	4	−3	3 June 2001	Congo 0–0 Mauritius (Congo; 3 June 2001)
DR Congo	2	0	0	2	1	5	−4	5 June 2011	Mauritius 1–2 DR Congo (Mauritius; 5 June 2011)
Ivory Coast	1	0	0	1	0	3	−3	21 March 2007	Mauritius 1–2 Ivory Coast (Mauritius; 21 March 2007)
Djibouti	1	0	0	1	1	3	−2	14 June 2023	
Egypt	5	0	0	5	2	18	−16	2 October 2009	Mauritius 0–1 Egypt (Mauritius; 29 March 2003)
Eswatini	4	1	2	1	7	9	–2	23 March 2025	Eswatini 2–2 Mauritius (South Africa; 25 May 2019); Mauritius 2–1 Eswatini (Mauritius; 11 June 2024); Eswatini 3–3 Mauritius (Eswatini; 23 March 2025)
Ethiopia	4	1	0	3	3	5	−2	24 April 1983	Mauritius 1–0 Ethiopia (Mauritius; 24 April 1983)
Equatorial Guinea	1	0	0	1	1	3	−2	9 October 2017	
Fiji	1	0	0	1	0	1	−1	23 March 2019	
Gabon	4	0	1	3	2	10	−8	20 June 1999	Mauritius 2–2 Gabon (Réunion; 20 June 1999)
Guinea	1	0	0	1	1	2	−1	5 March 1974	Guinea 2–1 Mauritius (Egypt; 5 March 1974)
Hong Kong	2	0	0	2	3	5	−2	19 November 2024	Hong Kong 4–3 Mauritius (Hong Kong; 12 October 1999)
India	2	0	1	1	1	2	-1	3 September 2024	India 2–1 Mauritius (India; 20 August 2017)
Indonesia	1	0	0	1	0	1	-1	11 September 2018	Indonesia 2–1 Mauritius (Indonesia; 11 September 2018)
Kenya	6	1	2	3	6	9	−3	18 June 2023	Mauritius 0–0 Kenya (Mauritius; 18 July 1971); Mauritius 2–2 Kenya (Mauritius; 17 February 1973); Mauritius 1–0 Kenya (Mauritius; 18 June 2023)
Lesotho	12	4	3	5	16	14	+2	7 July 2023	Mauritius 5–1 Lesotho (Mauritius; 30 September 1973)
Liberia	2	0	0	2	0	6	−6	16 June 2001	Mauritius 0–2 Liberia (Mauritius; 16 June 2001)
Libya	2	0	1	1	1	2	−1	13 October 2025	
Macau	1	1	0	0	1	0	+1	22 March 2018	Macau 0–1 Mauritius (Macau; 22 March 2018)
Madagascar	38	15	8	15	74	53	+21	23 July 2008	Mauritius 7–0 Madagascar (Réunion; 31 July 1952)
Malawi	10	1	2	7	8	18	−10	10 July 2022	Mauritius 3–2 Malawi (Mauritius; 28 January 1977)
Maldives	1	0	1	0	1	1	0	4 August 2011	Maldives 1–1 Mauritius (Seychelles; 4 August 2011)
Mauritania	2	0	0	2	0	3	−3	20 April 2014	Mauritania 1–0 Mauritius (Mauritania; 12 April 2014)
Mayotte	4	0	2	2	1	4	−3	11 August 2011	Mayotte 0–0 (4–5) Mauritius (Seychelles; 11 August 2011)
Mongolia	1	1	0	0	2	0	+2	27 March 2018	Mongolia 0–2 Mauritius (Mongolia; 27 March 2018)
Mozambique	8	0	3	5	1	11	−10	7 June 2025	Mauritius 0–0 Mozambique (Mauritius; 16 September 1984); Mauritius 0–0 Mozambique (Lesotho; 30 April 2006); Mozambique 0–0 Mauritius (South Africa; 7 June 2025)
Namibia	3	2	0	1	4	3	+1	6 July 2013	Namibia 1–2 Mauritius (Namibia; 7 June 1990); Mauritius 1–0 Namibia (Mauritius; 8 April 2001)
Nepal	2	0	0	2	0	2	–2	1 February 2022	Nepal 1–0 Mauritius (Nepal; 1 February 2022)
New Caledonia	1	1	0	0	3	1	+2	20 March 2019	New Caledonia 1–3 Mauritius (New Caledonia; 21 March 2019)
Pakistan	1	1	0	0	3	0	+3	11 June 2023	Mauritius 3–0 Pakistan (Mauritius; 11 June 2023)
Qatar	1	0	0	1	0	3	−3	5 September 2013	Qatar 3–0 Mauritius (Qatar; 5 September 2014)
Réunion	36	19	10	7	102	40	+62	15 September 2012	Mauritius 15–2 Réunion (Madagascar; 1950)
Rhodesia	2	2	0	0	5	3	+2	26 November 1967	Rhodesia 1–2 Mauritius (Rhodesia; 25 November 1967); Rhodesia 2–3 Mauritius (Rhodesia; 26 November 1967)
Saint Kitts and Nevis	1	0	1	0	1	1	0	22 August 2017	Mauritius 1–1 Saint Kitts and Nevis (Mauritius; 22 August 2017)
São Tomé and Príncipe	4	0	1	3	5	9	–4	27 March 2022	Mauritius 3–3 São Tomé and Príncipe (Mauritius; 27 March 2022)
Senegal	2	0	0	2	0	9	−9	9 October 2011	Senegal 2–0 Mauritius (Mauritius; 9 October 2011)
Seychelles	22	11	5	6	39	27	+12	10 July 2013	Seychelles 2–6 Mauritius (Mauritius; 28 August 1993); Seychelles 0–4 Mauritius (Zambia; 10 July 2013)
Singapore	1	0	1	0	1	1	0	7 September 2018	Singapore 1–1 Mauritius (Singapore; 7 September 2018)
Somalia	2	0	2	0	0	0	0	31 March 2026	Mauritius 0–0 Somalia (Mauritius; 31 March 2026)
South Africa	13	1	4	8	5	19	−14	10 June 2025	Mauritius 2–0 South Africa (Mauritius; 10 January 2004)
Sri Lanka	2	1	0	1	5	3	+2	5 October 2026	Mauritius 3–0 Sri Lanka (Mauritius; 2 October 2026)
Sudan	2	0	0	2	1	5	−4	2 June 2007	Mauritius 1–2 Sudan (Mauritius; 25 March 2007)
Syria	1	0	0	1	0	2	−2	6 September 2024	Syria 2–0 Mauritius (India; 6 September 2024)
Tanzania	12	3	4	5	13	22	−9	6 September 2008	Mauritius 3–2 Tanzania (Mauritius; 16 September 1979)
Togo	2	0	1	1	1	7	–6	12 November 2017	Mauritius 1–1 Togo (Mauritius; 28 March 2015)
Tunisia	2	0	1	1	0	2	−2	16 June 2007	Mauritius 0–0 Tunisia (Mauritius; 3 September 2006)
Uganda	5	1	1	3	5	13	−8	16 November 2003	Mauritius 3–1 Uganda (Mauritius; 16 November 2003)
Zaire	3	0	0	3	2	11	−9	16 June 1996	Zaire 2–0 Mauritius (Zaire; 16 June 1996)
Zambia	11	0	2	9	6	28	−22	31 July 2004	Zambia 2–2 Mauritius (Mauritius; 17 November 1978); Mauritius 0–0 Zambia (Mauritius; 23 February 1997)
Zimbabwe	11	1	2	8	5	22	−17	4 June 2025	Mauritius 2–0 Zimbabwe (Mauritius; 29 August 1982)
Total	287	77	67	143	367	466	−99	5 October 2026	Mauritius 15–2 Réunion (Madagascar; 1950)

== Honours ==
=== Regional ===
- Indian Ocean Games
  - (gold) Gold medal (2): 1985, 2003
  - (silver) Silver medal (3): 1990, 2011, 2019
  - (bronze) Bronze medal (3): 1993, 2015, 2023
- Indian Ocean Games Triangulaire
  - (gold) Champions (10): 1947, 1948, 1949 1950, 1951, 1952, 1953, 1954, 1956, 1957
  - (silver) Runners-up (2): 1955, 1958
  - (bronze) Third place (1): 1963

== See also ==
- Mauritius national under-17 football team
- Mauritius national under-20 football team
- Mauritius national beach soccer team
