= Football at the 2003 Indian Ocean Island Games =

2003 Football at the Indian Ocean Island Games
Jeux des îles de l'océan Indien

Tournament details
- Host country: Mauritius
- City: Curepipe
- Dates: 28 August – 6 September
- Teams: 5 (from 1 confederation)
- Venue: George V Stadium (in Curepipe host cities)

Final positions
- Champions: Mauritius (2nd title)
- Runners-up: Réunion
- Third place: Seychelles

Tournament statistics
- Matches played: 9
- Goals scored: 22 (2.44 per match)
- Top scorer(s): (Mauritius) Kersley Appou (Mauritius) Christopher Perle (3 goals each)

The men's association football tournament at the 2003 Indian Ocean Island Games (French: Jeux des îles de l'océan Indien 2003) held in Mauritius. Originally scheduled for Moroni, Comoros; moved to Mauritius

== Teams ==
- Comoros
- Madagascar
- Mauritius
- Réunion
- Seychelles

== Group stage ==
=== Group A ===
Pos	Team	Pld	W	D	L	GF	GA	GD	Pts	Qualification
1	Mauritius (H)	2	1	1	0	3	1	+2	4	Advance to knockout stage
2	Seychelles	2	0	2	0	1	1	0	2	Advance to knockout stage
3	Madagascar	2	0	1	1	2	4	−2	1	

Source: IOCS
Rules for classification: Tie-breaking criteria
(H) Hosts
28 August 2003
UTC+4

Seychelles	1–1	Madagascar
Alpha Baldé 87'		Ruphin Menakely 32'

Stade George V, Curepipe
Attendance: 1,000
Referee: Lim Kee Chong (Mauritius)

30 August 2003
UTC+4

Mauritius	3–1	Madagascar
Kersley Appou 15' (pen.), 63'; Christopher Perle 17'		Claude Ralaitafika 54'

Stade George V, Curepipe
Attendance: 4,500
Referee: Christophe Ramsamy (Réunion)

2 September 2003
UTC+4

Mauritius	0–0	Seychelles

Stade George V, Curepipe

=== Group B ===
Pos	Team	Pld	W	D	L	GF	GA	GD	Pts	Qualification
1	Réunion	2	2	0	0	5	0	+5	6	Advance to knockout stage
2	Comoros	2	0	0	2	0	5	−5	0	Advance to knockout stage

Source: IOCS
Rules for classification: Tie-breaking criteria
30 August 2003
UTC+4

Réunion	1–0	Comoros
Willy Robert 34'

Stade Auguste Vollaire, Centre de Flacq
Attendance: 103
Referee: Jean-Claude Labrosse (Seychelles)

2 September 2003
UTC+4

Comoros	0–4	Réunion
		Payet 6', 87'; Hoarau 10', 74'

Stade Auguste Vollaire, Centre de Flacq

== Knockout stage ==
Semi-finals
4 September
Mauritius	5
Comoros	0
4 September
Réunion	1
Seychelles	0

Final
6 September
Mauritius	2
Réunion	1
Third place
6 September
Comoros	0
Seychelles	2

== Semi-final ==
4 September 2003
UTC+4

Mauritius	5–0	Comoros
Christopher Perle 8', 87'; Kersley Appou 42' (pen.); Henri Speville 47'; Jimmy Cundasamy 70'

Stade George V, Curepipe
Attendance: 4,500
Referee: Jean-Claude Labrosse (Seychelles)

4 September 2003
UTC+4

Réunion	1–0	Seychelles
Willy Robert 2'

Stade Auguste Vollaire, Centre de Flacq
Attendance: 1,000

== Third place match ==
6 September 2003
UTC+4

Seychelles	2–0	Comoros
Yelvahny Rose 2', 25'

Stade George V, Curepipe

== Final ==
6 September 2003
UTC+4

Mauritius	2–1	Réunion
Jimmy Cundasamy 41'; J.M. Ithier 83'		Gérard Hubert 70'

Stade George V, Curepipe
Attendance: 10,000
Referee: Jean-Claude Labrosse (Seychelles)

== Medalists ==
Event	Gold	Silver	Bronze
Men's football	Mauritius	Réunion	Seychelles

== Final ranking ==
Pos	Team	Pld	W	D	L	GF	GA	GD	Pts	Final result
1	Mauritius (H)	4	3	1	0	10	2	+8	10	Champions
2	Réunion	4	3	0	1	7	2	+5	9	Runners-up
3	Seychelles	4	1	2	1	3	2	+1	5	Third place
4	Comoros	4	0	0	4	0	12	−12	0	Fourth place
5	Madagascar	2	0	1	1	2	4	−2	1	Group stage

Source: IOCS
(H) Hosts

Per statistical convention in football, matches decided in extra time are counted as wins and losses, while matches decided by penalty shoot-out are counted as draws.

== See also ==
- Indian Ocean Island Games
- Football at the Indian Ocean Island Games
