= Alain Happe =

French football director

Managerial career
- Years: Team
- AS Algrange (men and women)
- 2011–2014: Togo (fitness and assistant)
- Mauritius (women)
- 2015: Mauritius (assistant)
- 2015–2016: Mauritius

Alain Happe is a French football director who was last known to have been in charge of the Mauritius national football team from 2015 to 2016.

== Career ==
=== Togo ===
Responsible for making sure that the Togo national team members were fit for every game at the 2013 Africa Cup of Nations, Happe complained that since they would travel through uncomfortable conditions, a decrease in their performance would be ineluctable, v stepping down from his post that February.

=== Mauritius ===
Assistant to Didier Six in Togo and in Mauritius, the Frenchman filled in Didier's post in 2015, taking charge of them for their 2017 Africa Cup of Nations qualifying Group H match away to Ghana but crashed out to Mayotte 1-2 at the semi-finals of the 2015 Indian Ocean Island Games and was owed some money from the Mauritius Football Association. Despite being uncertain regarding his future with the Mauritius Football Association, the former assistant was named as technical director of Mauritius at the start of 2016 before being relieved of his duties that April. However, he was originally angry at the miscommunication between him and the MFA and wanted official clarification about his dismissal but stated that he regretted nothing in the end.
