= Francisco Filho (footballer) =

Brazilian footballer and coach (born 1940)

Personal information
- Full name: Joaquim Francisco Filho
- Date of birth: 27 October 1940 (age 86)
- Place of birth: São Paulo, Brazil
- Height: 1.76 m (5 ft 9 in)
- Position: Midfielder

Senior career*
Years	Team	Apps	(Gls)
1966–1967	Nîmes	16	(5)
1967–1968	Besançon	25	(8)
1968–1972	Boulogne	106	(38)
1972	Toulouse	3	(0)
Total		150	(51)

Managerial career
- 2017–2018: Mauritius
- * Club domestic league appearances and goals

Joaquim Francisco Filho (born 27 October 1940), sometimes known simply as Francisco, is a Brazilian former professional footballer and coach. A midfielder, he spent 17 years as a footballer in Brazil, Venezuela, Portugal and France before going into coaching at the age of 33. After 29 years at Clairefontaine, the academy of the French Football Federation, Filho joined Manchester United as a youth coach in 2002. He retired as a coach in 2005, but returned to the game with the newly formed A.C. St. Louis in 2009.

== Career ==
Born in São Paulo, Filho began his professional football career in 1957, at the age of 16. During a 17-year career, he played for clubs in Brazil, Venezuela, Portugal and France, where he retired. After retiring as a player, Filho became a coach and embarked on a 29-year career with the French Football Federation's academy, Clairefontaine. During that time, he oversaw the development of players such as Thierry Henry, Eric Cantona and Jean-Pierre Papin.

In August 2002, Filho was hired by Premier League side, Manchester United, to help with the development of their youth players. He was appointed manager of the Manchester United Under-17s team, and later the Under-18s, following the club's reorganisation of their youth teams. He retired from football in 2005 but was tempted back to the game four years later, when he linked up with American side A.C. St. Louis as their Director of Player Development.

In August 2017, 76-year old Filho was appointed manager of the Mauritius national football team. He was sacked in October 2018.
