= Robert George O'Malley =

Canadian politician

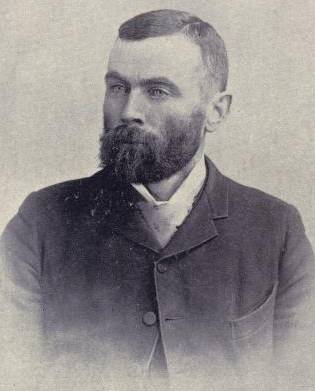

Member of the Legislative Assembly of Manitoba for Lorne
- In office 1888–1895

Personal details
- Born: September 4, 1856; Tuam, County Galway, Ireland
- Died: October 9, 1938 (aged 90); Winnipeg, Manitoba

Robert George O'Malley (September 4, 1856 – October 9, 1938) was an Irish-born farmer and political figure in Manitoba. He represented Lorne from 1888 to 1895 in the Legislative Assembly of Manitoba as a Conservative.

He was born in Tuam, County Galway, the son of John O'Malley and Catharine Robinson, and was educated in Connemara. O'Malley came to Manitoba in 1872. He was employed in the surveys of the province for three years and then worked on the construction of telegraph lines. O'Malley then settled on a farm in Marquette County but moved to Somerset in Rock Lake County after two years. In 1882, he married Sarah Clouston. He served on the council for the Rural Municipality of Lorne, also serving as reeve. O'Malley was also president of the local Agricultural Society. He was defeated when he ran for reelection to the Manitoba assembly in 1896. He died in Winnipeg at the age of 82.
