= Boualem Khouider =

- Occupations: Applied mathematician, climate scientist, academic, and author
- Awards: Distinguished Visitor, Courant Institute for Mathematical Sciences, New York University; Senior Fellow, Institute for Pure and Applied Mathematics (IPAM), University of California Los Angeles

Academic background
- Education: University of Sciences and Technology Houari Boumedienne; University of Montreal
- Thesis: Modelisation asymptotique pour la simulation aux grandes echelles de la combustion turbulente premelangee (2002)
- Doctoral advisor: Anne Bourlioux

Boualem Khouider is an Algerian-Canadian applied mathematician, climate scientist, academic, and author. He is a professor, and former Chair of Mathematics and Statistics at the University of Victoria.

Khouider has published more than 100 papers with his most recognizable contributions being in the applied mathematics, atmospheric science, as well as climate modelling. He is the author of a book Models for Tropical Climate Dynamics: Waves, Clouds, and Precipitation, and is the editor of several edited volumes. He is also a Senior Fellow of Institute for Pure and Applied Mathematics (IPAM) at the University of California Los Angeles, a senior advisor of Center for Prototype Climate Models at NYU Abu-Dhabi Institute, and holds editorial appointments as an editor for Mathematics of Climate and Weather Forecasting, and as associate editor for AIMS Mathematics,

== Education ==
Khouider received a "High studies diploma" (DES) in Mathematical Analysis of Partial Differential Equations from the University of Sciences and Technology Houari Boumedienne in 1990. He then enrolled at University of Montreal, and earned his Master's and doctoral degrees in Applied Mathematics in 1997 and 2002, respectively.

== Career ==
Khouider began his academic career as an assistant lecturer at Ecole Nationale Polytechnique in 1990, and was subsequently appointed as an assistant lecturer at the University of Sciences and Technology Houari Boumedienne from 1992 until 1994. During this time period, he also held concurrent appointments as lecturer at Ecole Nationale Naval, and Institut National de Formation en Batiment. In 1995, he held a brief appointment as lecturer at Ecole Militaire Polytechnique, before being appointed by the University of Montreal as a Teaching Assistant, and by Center of Research on Applied Computations (Cerca) as a research assistant from 1996 to 2000. Following this, he was appointed as a research associate in Courant Institute of Mathematical Sciences at New York University until 2003. He held his next appointment at the University of Victoria as Assistant Professor Mathematics and Statistics in 2003, and was promoted to associate professor in 2008, and to Full Professor in 2013.

Khouider's contribution to the community includes his role as an organizer of the conferences and workshops, especially the ones in Banff and Oberwolfach. He has also conducted invited lectures and presentations at various professional institutions, including New York University, DongHua University, and the University of Sciences and Technology Houari Boumedienne.

== Research ==
Khouider's work mainly focuses on applied mathematics, in particular in the fields of computational fluid dynamics, earth System modelling, sea-ice dynamics modelling, tropical meteorology, tropical extra-tropical interactions, organized convection and convectively coupled waves. His research work has been supported by numerous professional organizations, including Natural Sciences and Engineering Research Council (NSERC), Canadian Foundation for Climate and Atmospheric Research, Indian Institute of Tropical Meteorology, and Pacific Institute for Mathematical Sciences.

=== Atmospheric science ===
Khouider conducted a detailed dynamical analysis for the linear waves in 2006, while developing a systematic model convective parameterization focused on highlighting the dynamic role of the three cloud types, congestus, stratiform, and deep convective cumulus clouds, in terms of exploring the dynamics of large-scale convectively coupled Kelvin waves, westward-propagating two-day waves, and the Madden–Julian oscillation. In a companion paper, he presented a report on idealized nonlinear numerical simulations in the context of the developed model. Furthermore, he highlighted how the adequate representation of the dominant intraseasonal and synoptic-scale variability in the tropics, characterized by the Madden–Julian oscillation (MJO) and convectively coupled waves, continues to be a problem in current operational general circulation models (GCMs).

Khouider discussed the role of environmental moisture in terms of the deepening of cumulus convection. It was found out that the mixing of water vapor by subgrid-scale turbulence has a significant impact on cloud depth, while the mixing of sensible heat has comparatively a negligible impact. In another study, he presented a paradigm model, and provided the applications of the stochastic multicloud framework in terms of improving deterministic parameterizations with clear deficiencies. Moreover, he along with co-worker, demonstrated the linear stability results for the multicloud model on an equatorial beta plane.

=== Climate modelling ===
In 2010, Khouider developed a stochastic multicloud model to represent the missing variability that occurred in global climate models due to unresolved features of organized tropical convection. Furthermore, he coupled stochastic multicloud model to a simple tropical climate model consisting of a system of ODEs, and highlighted the dynamical features of the coupled model. Using a statistical inference method based on the Bayesian paradigm, he estimated the stochasticity of convection in terms of Giga-LES data. In his study conducted in 2019, he demonstrated the stochastic parametrization of organized convection, and also explored the performance of the stochastic multicloud model in a stand-alone mode where the cloud model is forced directly by the observed predictors without feedback into the environmental variables. Later on, he successfully implemented the stochastic multicloud model in the CFSv2 GCM, used by the Indian Institute for Tropical Meteorology which led to huge improvements of the climate model in terms of simulating tropical modes of variability, including the MJO, monsoon intra-seasonal oscillations, and convectively coupled equatorial waves.

Khouider also proposed a non-oscillatory balanced numerical scheme with application to preserve geostrophic steady states with minimal ad hoc dissipation by using state of the art numerical methods for each piece. Furthermore, he explored and highlighted the role of stratiform heating in the context of scale-selection of organized tropical convection over the monsoon trough, while using aquaplanet version of a coarse-resolution atmospheric general circulation model coupled to a stochastic multicloud cumulus parameterization scheme. In his paper titled "Climate science in the tropics: waves, vortices and PDEs," he presented a review on the interdisciplinary contributions over the last decade through the modus operandi of applied mathematics to most frequently occurring scientific problems. He discussed novel multiscale equations, PDEs, and numerical algorithms with the purpose to persuade mathematicians and physicists to do research in this particular area of study. In a recent study, he conducted a comparative analysis between four theories of the Madden-Julian Oscillation (MJO), which lead to a realization that theoretical thinking of the MJO is diverse and understanding of MJO dynamics needs to be further advanced.

== Awards and honors ==
- 2009-10 - Distinguished Visitor, Courant Institute for Mathematical Sciences, New York University
- 2010 - Senior Fellow, Institute for Pure and Applied Mathematics (IPAM), University of California Los Angeles
- 2015 - Research Excellence Award, Faculty of Science

== Bibliography ==
=== Books ===
- Models for Tropical Climate Dynamics: Waves, Clouds, and Precipitation (2019) ISBN 9783030177751

=== Selected articles ===
- Majda, A. J., & Khouider, B. (2002). Stochastic and mesoscopic models for tropical convection. Proceedings of the National Academy of Sciences, 99(3), 1123–1128.
- Khouider, B., & Majda, A. J. (2006). A simple multicloud parameterization for convectively coupled tropical waves. Part I: Linear analysis. Journal of the atmospheric sciences, 63(4), 1308–1323.
- Khouider, B., & Majda, A. J. (2007). A simple multicloud parameterization for convectively coupled tropical waves. Part II: Nonlinear simulations. Journal of the atmospheric sciences, 64(2), 381–400.
- Majda, A. J., Franzke, C., & Khouider, B. (2008). An applied mathematics perspective on stochastic modelling for climate. Philosophical Transactions of the Royal Society A: Mathematical, Physical and Engineering Sciences, 366(1875), 2427–2453.
- Khouider, B., Biello, J., & Majda, A. J. (2010). A stochastic multicloud model for tropical convection. Communications in Mathematical Sciences, 8(1), 187–216.
