= Boualem Mankour =

French-Algerian football manager

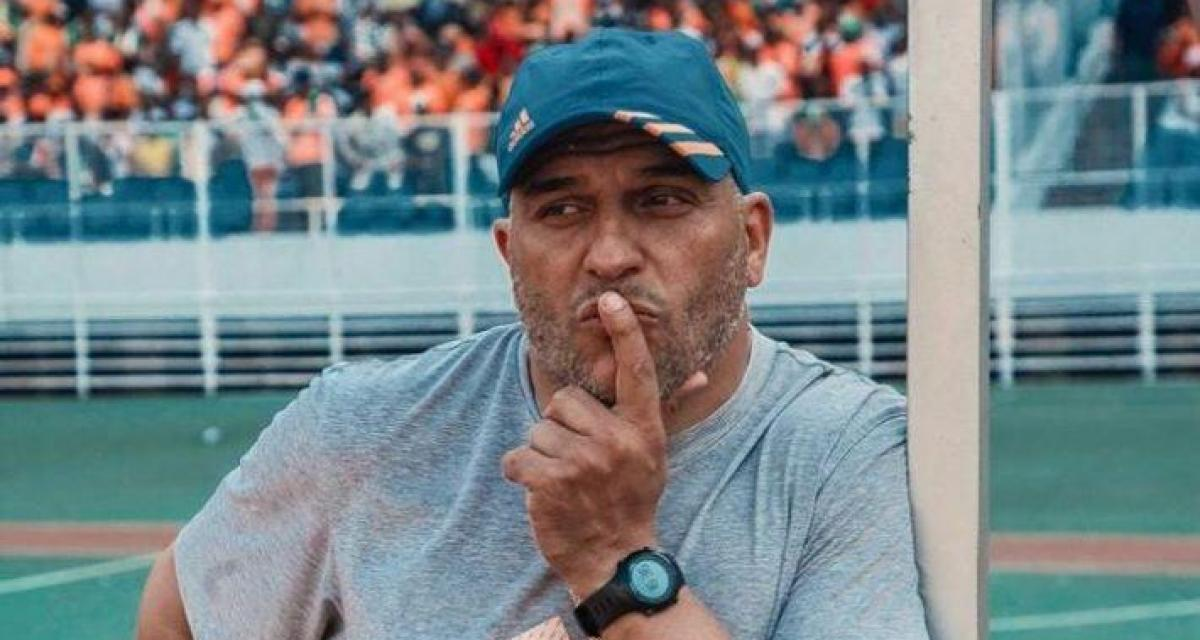

Personal information
- Date of birth: 21 September 1970 (age 56)

Managerial career
- Years: Team
- 2007–2011: Saint-Éloi Lupopo
- 2014: FC Seichamps
- 2014: Democratic Republic of the Congo U-17
- 2017: Saint-Éloi Lupopo
- 2020–2021: Mauritius

Boualem Mankour (born 21 September 1970) is a French-Algerian football manager and former footballer.

He coached Saint-Éloi Lupopo from 2007 to 2011, managing a second place in 2010 Linafoot. In 2014, he was coach of FC Seichamps.

He was appointed manager of the Mauritius national team in February 2020.
