= Robert Edmund O'Malley =

American mathematician (1939–2020)

Robert E. O'Malley
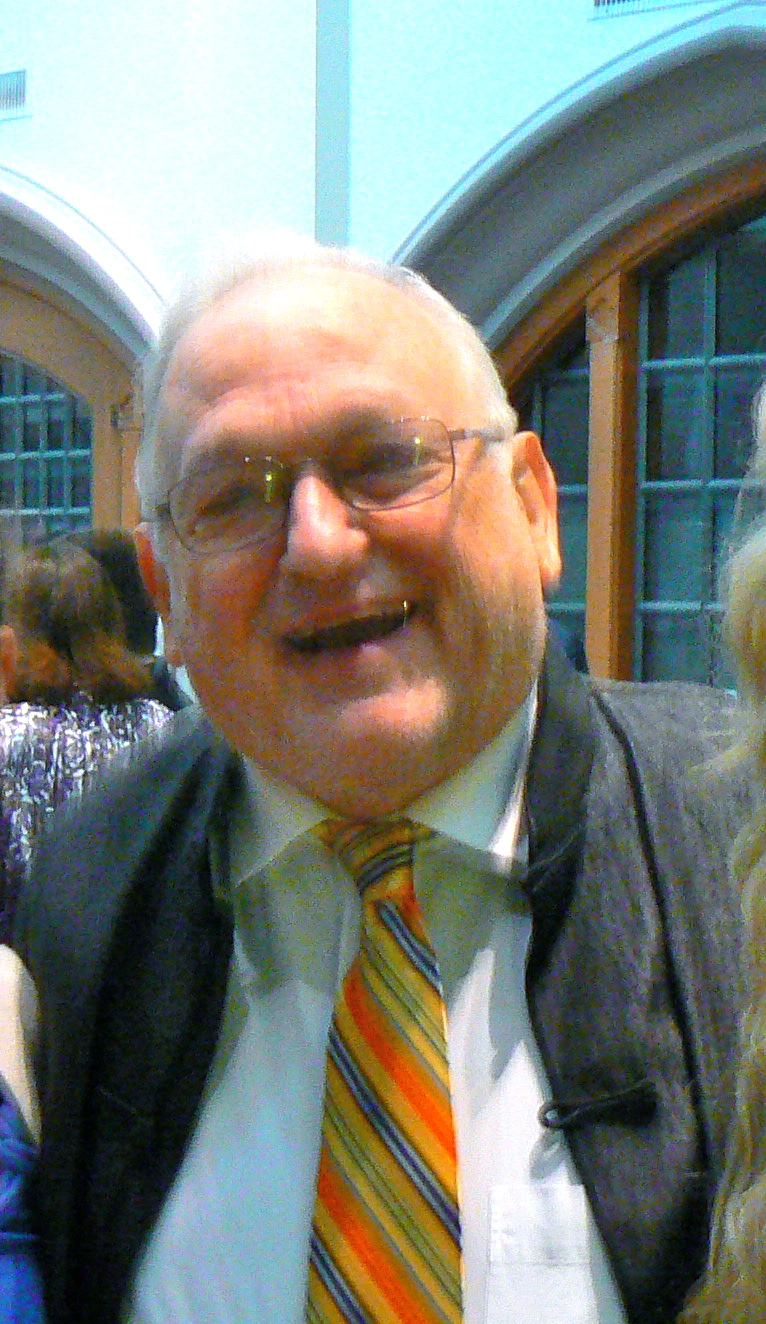
- O'Malley in 2011
- Born: May 23, 1939
- Died: December 31, 2020 (aged 81)
- Education: University of New Hampshire Stanford University
- Known for: Singular Perturbation Theory, Asymptotic Methods
- Scientific career
- Fields: Mathematician
- Workplaces: University of Washington
- Doctoral advisor: Gordon Eric Latta

Robert Edmund O'Malley Jr. (1939—2020) was an American mathematician.

O'Malley studied electrical engineering and mathematics at the University of New Hampshire, where he received his baccalaureate degree in 1960 and his master's in 1961. He then studied differential equations and singular perturbations at Stanford University, where he received his doctorate in mathematics in 1966. After brief appointments at the University of North Carolina (Chapel Hill), Bell Telephone Laboratories, the Courant Institute (New York University), and the Mathematics Research Center (the University of Wisconsin, Madison), O'Malley returned to New York University in 1968. He remained there, doing research on asymptotic methods and singular perturbations with Joseph Keller and a number of other stimulating colleagues and students. O'Malley spent a year at the University of Edinburgh, where his lecture notes formed the basis of his book, Introduction to Singular Perturbations (Academic Press, 1974). In 1973, he moved to the University of Arizona (Tucson) where he later organized a successful interdisciplinary program in applied mathematics, and where he applied singular perturbation ideas in control theory. After a sabbatical at Stanford University, O'Malley moved to Rensselaer Polytechnic Institute (Troy, New York) in 1981. At Rensselaer, he headed a mathematical sciences department which emphasized applied mathematics and computer science. There, he was active in campus affairs and served as the chairman of the faculty and the Ford Foundation Professor. Soon after a sabbatical at the Technical University of Vienna, where O'Malley studied asymptotic methods in semiconductor modeling, he moved to the University of Washington, Seattle.

O'Malley's final appointment was at the University of Washington Department of Applied Mathematics as an emeritus faculty member. He served as the president of the Society for Industrial and Applied Mathematics (SIAM) (1991–1992). In 2009 he became a SIAM Fellow. In 2012 he became a fellow of the American Mathematical Society.

== Work ==
O'Malley's research emphasized the relationship between singular perturbation theory and various regularization methods for differential-algebraic systems, geometric approaches to understanding the limiting solutions to singularly perturbed boundary value problems, the motion of shock layers and other interfaces, the interplay between asymptotic and numerical methods, and tough problems of asymptotic matching. Toward the end of his life, he continued to collaborate with an international collection of interesting characters, and received support for his scholarly work from the National Science Foundation.

O'Malley was known for several pioneering contributions to singular perturbation theory and applications.

O'Malley was especially active as a member of SIAM, the Society for Industrial and Applied Mathematics. He was president of SIAM in 1991 and 1992, and had been vice-president in charge of their publication program which encompasses ten journals and several book series. Among his other positions with SIAM he had been program chair for several meetings including ICIAM `91, the second international industrial and applied mathematics conference, which drew 2,200 participants.

O'Malley served on a number of boards, including advisory committees for the National Institute of Standards and Technology, the Electric Power Research Institute, and Argonne National Laboratory, and more generally as a spokesperson for applied mathematics

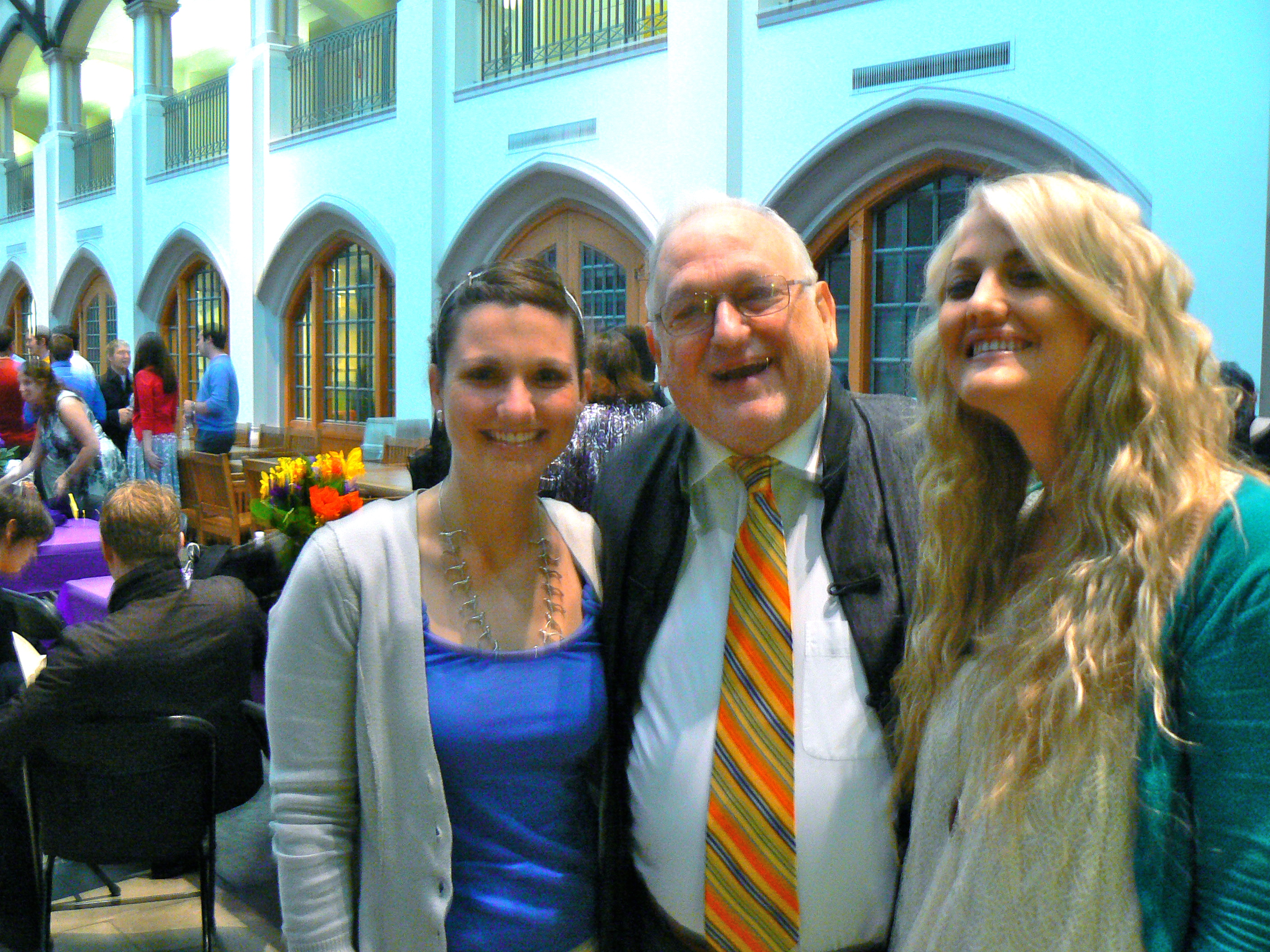
O'Malley with two of his students at University of Washington's 2011 graduation.

== Selected publications ==
- On the motion of viscous shocks and the supersensitivity of their steady-state limits, Methods Applics. Analysis, 1, (1994), (with J.G.L. Laforgue).
- Shock layer movement for Burger's equation, SIAM J. Appl. Math. 54: (1994) (with J.G.L. Laforgue).
- On regularizing differential-algebraic equations, Trends and Developments in Ordinary Differential Equations, Y. Alavi and P.F. Hsieh, editors, World Scientific, 1994 (with L.V. Kalachev).
- The regularization of nonlinear differential-algebraic equations. SIAM J. Math Anal., 25: pp. 615–629, 1994 (with L.V. Kalachev).
- Super sensitive boundary value problems, "Asymptotic and Numerical Methods for Partial Differential Equations with Critical Parameters", H.G. Kaper and M. Garbey, editors, Kluwer, 1993, pp. 215–223 (with J.G.L. Laforgue).
- Singular Perturbation Methods for Ordinary Differential Equations, Springer-Verlag, New York, 1991.
