= 2002 African Cup of Nations qualification =

Football tournament

This page details the process of qualifying for the 2002 African Cup of Nations.

== Qualified teams ==
The 16 qualified teams are:

- Algeria
- Burkina Faso
- Cameroon (holders)
- DR Congo
- Egypt
- Ghana
- Ivory Coast
- Liberia
- Mali (hosts)
- Morocco
- Nigeria
- Togo
- Senegal
- South Africa
- Tunisia
- Zambia

== Preliminary round ==
The quarter finalists of 2000 Africa Cup of Nations received a bye to the group stage. These teams are: Algeria, Egypt, Ghana, Nigeria, Senegal, South Africa, Tunisia.

Team 1	Agg.	Team 2	1st leg	2nd leg
Mauritania	0–3	Burkina Faso	0–0	0–3
Gambia	2–4	Guinea	2–2	0–2
São Tomé and Príncipe	2–5	Gabon	1–1	1–4
Equatorial Guinea	1–5	Angola	0–1	1–4
Benin	4–8	Namibia	2–0	2–8
Niger	0–7	Ivory Coast	0–1	0–6
Cape Verde	1–3	Liberia	1–0	0–3
Sierra Leone	2–2 (2–4 p)	Togo	2–0	0–2
Central African Republic	1–3	DR Congo	1–1	0–2
Sudan	6–3	Eritrea	5–1	1–2
Rwanda	3–6	Congo	2–1	1–5
Djibouti	1–4	Burundi	1–3	0–1
Botswana	1–2	Madagascar	1–0	0–2
Chad	4–4 (7–8 p)	Libya	3–1	1–3
Ethiopia	1–2	Zambia	1–0	0–2
Seychelles	0–6	Zimbabwe	0–1	0–5
Tanzania	2–4	Mauritius	0–1	2–3
Uganda	5–2	Malawi	3–1	2–1
Lesotho	1–1 (3–2 p)	Mozambique	1–0	0–1
Swaziland	3–5	Kenya	3–2	0–3
Morocco	w/o	Guinea-Bissau	—	—

30 June 2000

Mauritania	0–0	Burkina Faso

Stade Olympique, Nouakchott
Attendance: 10,000
Referee: Albina da Silva (Guinea-Bissau)
16 July 2000

Burkina Faso	3–0	Mauritania
Barro 23', 71'; Diabaté 76'

Stade du 4 Août, Ouagadougou
Attendance: 25,000
Referee: Ibrahim Djingarey (Niger)

Burkina Faso win 3–0 on aggregate.

1 July 2000

Gambia	2–2	Guinea
Corr 31' (pen.), 44' (pen.)		Diané 39'; Youla 87'

Independence Stadium, Bakau
Attendance: 15,000
16 July 2000

Guinea	2–0	Gambia
T. Camara 8'; Youla 90'

Stade du 28 Septembre, Conakry
Attendance: 15,000

Guinea win 4–2 on aggregate.

1 July 2000

São Tomé and Príncipe	1–1	Gabon
Tonga 5'		Tamboucha 12'

Estádio Nacional 12 de Julho, São Tomé
15 July 2000

Gabon	4–1	São Tomé and Príncipe
Bito'o 17', 21', 70'; Ondo 50'		Ramos 88'

Stade Omar Bongo, Libreville
Attendance: 15,000
Referee: Eboh Messan (Togo)

Gabon win 5–2 on aggregate.

2 July 2000

Equatorial Guinea	0–1	Angola
		Isaac 72'

Estadio La Paz, Malabo
16 July 2000

Angola	4–1	Equatorial Guinea
Paulão 14'; Akwá 18'; Mendonça 83'; Isaac 88'		Mba 33'

Estádio da Cidadela, Luanda
Attendance: 20,000

Angola win 5–1 on aggregate.

2 July 2000

Benin	2–0	Namibia
Bessan 46'; Latoundji 50'

Stade de l'Amitié, Cotonou
Attendance: 25,000
15 July 2000

Namibia	8–2	Benin
Nauseb 4'; Goraseb 8', 20', 36'; Tjikuzu 25', 43'; Jacobs 31' (pen.); Benjamin 77'		Assouma 6', 12'

Independence Stadium, Windhoek
Attendance: 5,000

Namibia win 8–4 on aggregate.

2 July 2000

Niger	0–1	Ivory Coast
		Dindane 55'

Stade Général Seyni Kountché, Niamey
Referee: Joseph Wellington (Ghana)
16 July 2000

Ivory Coast	6–0	Niger
Bamba 9'; Yoffou 42', 65', 68'; Zézé 77'; Zoko 84'

Stade Félix Houphouët-Boigny, Abidjan
Attendance: 25,000
Referee: Abderahim El Arjoun (Morocco)

Ivory Coast win 7–0 on aggregate.

3 July 2000

Cape Verde	1–0	Liberia
Toni

Estádio Municipal Adérito Sena, Mindelo
16 July 2000

Liberia	3–0	Cape Verde
Weah 3'; Brown 71'; Roberts 83'

Samuel Kanyon Doe Sports Complex, Monrovia
Attendance: 18,000
Referee: Zeli Sinko (Ivory Coast)

Liberia win 3–1 on aggregate.

20 August 2000

Sierra Leone	2–0	Togo
Bah 33'; Kanu 51'

National Stadium, Freetown
Attendance: 10,000
Referee: Mamadouba Camara (Guinea)
3 September 2000

Togo	2–0	Sierra Leone
Kader 26'; Salou 60' (pen.)
Penalties
	4–2

Stade de Kégué, Lomé
Attendance: 25,000
Referee: Lassina Paré (Burkina Faso)

Togo win 4–2 on penalties after 2–2 after extra time.

2 July 2000

Central African Republic	1–1	DR Congo
Malo 25'		Yemweni 12'

Barthelemy Boganda Stadium, Bangui
Referee: Hissene Ladoual (Chad)
16 July 2000

DR Congo	2–0	Central African Republic
Yemweni 6'; Mayélé 82'

Stade des Martyrs, Kinshasa
Attendance: 75,000
Referee: Alex Mana Sule (Nigeria)

DR Congo won 3–1 on aggregate.

2 July 2000

Sudan	5–1	Eritrea
Khalid Bakhit 4'; Moga 11'; Mohamed Musa Dawod 54'; Hisham Seeni 56'; Amir Mustafa 86'		Abraham 6'

Khartoum Stadium, Khartoum
15 July 2000

Eritrea	2–1	Sudan
Abreha 33'; Shimangus 45'		Richard 66'

Asmara Stadium, Asmara

Sudan won 6–3 on aggregate.

2 July 2000

Rwanda	2–1	Congo

Stade Amahoro, Kigali
16 July 2000

Congo	5–1	Rwanda
Eder 6'; Amoros 8' (pen.); Moyimouadeka 26'; Ngoma-Nanitélamio 61'; Tsoumou 61'		Mayele 80'

Stade Municipal, Pointe Noire
Attendance: 30,000

Congo won 6–3 on aggregate.

30 June 2000

Djibouti	1–3	Burundi

Djibouti city
15 July 2000

Burundi	1–0	Djibouti

Prince Louis Rwagasore Stadium, Bujumbura
Attendance: 6,000

Burundi won 4–1 on aggregate.

1 July 2000

Botswana	1–0	Madagascar
Selolwane 25'

National Stadium, Gaborone
Attendance: 15,000
15 July 2000

Madagascar	2–0	Botswana
Randrianaivo 3'; Ralaitafika 48'

Mahamasina Municipal Stadium, Antananarivo

Madagascar won 2–1 on aggregate.

30 June 2000

Chad	3–1	Libya
Lokissimbaye 2'		Al Masli

Stade Omnisports Idriss Mahamat Ouya, N'Djamena
14 July 2000

Libya	3–1	Chad
El Taib; Al-Tarhouni; Al Masli		Lokissimbaye
Penalties
	8–7

June 11 Stadium, Tripoli

Libya won 8–7 on penalty shootout after 4–4 on aggregate.

2 July 2000

Ethiopia	1–0	Zambia
Getachew 34'

Addis Ababa Stadium, Addis Ababa
Attendance: 25,000
Referee: Ahmed Salih (Sudan)
15 July 2000

Zambia	2–0	Ethiopia
Makufi 2'; Kampamba 67'

Independence Stadium, Lusaka
Referee: Petros Mathabela (South Africa)

Zambia on 2–1 on aggregate.

1 July 2000

Seychelles	0–1	Zimbabwe
		Mwaruwari 35'

Victoria, Seychelles
16 July 2000

Zimbabwe	5–0	Seychelles
Petros; Makunike; Ndlovu; Ncube

Barbourfields Stadium, Bulawayo
Attendance: 30,000

Zimbabwe on 6–0 on aggregate.

1 July 2000

Tanzania	0–1	Mauritius
		Naboth 57'

Benjamin Mkapa National Stadium, Dar es Salaam
16 July 2000

Mauritius	3–2	Tanzania
Bax 77'; François 79'; Perle 88'		Tembele 24'; Lungu 28'

Stade George V, Curepipe
Attendance: 30,000

Mauritius won 4–2 on aggregate.

1 July 2000

Uganda	3–1	Malawi
Mubiru 3'; Magumba 14'; Mukasa 52'		Chitsulo 89'

Nakivubo Stadium, Kampala
Attendance: 15,000
15 July 2000

Malawi	1–2	Uganda
Chirwali 51'		Mubiru 30'; Musisi 81'

Chichiri Stadium, Blantyre
Attendance: 25,000
Referee: ... (Mauritius)

Uganda won 5–2 on aggregate.

2 July 2000

Lesotho	1–0	Mozambique
Ntsonyana 85'

Setsoto Stadium, Maseru
Attendance: 5,000
16 July 2000

Mozambique	1–0	Lesotho
Dário 82'
Penalties
	2–3

Estádio da Machava, Maputo
Attendance: 15,000

Lesotho won 3–2 on penalty shootout after 1–1 after extra time.

2 July 2000

Swaziland	3–2	Kenya
D. Dlamini 43', 75' (pen.); M. Dlamini 56'		Otieno 38'; Okoth 86'

Somholo National Stadium, Lobamba
15 July 2000

Kenya	3–0	Swaziland
Onyango 19'; Okoth 78'; Simiyu 83'

Mombasa Municipal Stadium, Mombasa
Attendance: 15,000

Kenya won 5–3 on aggregate.

Morocco	w/o	Guinea-Bissau

Guinea-Bissau withdrew; Morocco advanced.

== Qualifying round ==
Qualifying took place between 2 September 2000 and 17 June 2001.

=== Group 1 ===
Team	Pld	W	D	L	GF	GA	GD	Pts
Nigeria	6	4	2	0	9	1	+8	14
Zambia	6	2	2	2	5	5	0	8
Madagascar	6	1	2	3	5	7	−2	5
Namibia	6	1	2	3	5	11	−6	5

2 September 2000

Nigeria	4–0	Namibia
Ikpeba 39', 73', 88'; Ojigwe 55'

Lagos National Stadium, Lagos
Attendance: 25,000
Referee: Zeli Sinko (Ivory Coast)
2 September 2000

Zambia	1–2	Madagascar
Lota 34'		Ratsimialona 42'; Randrianaivo 75'

Independence Stadium, Lusaka
Attendance: 30,000
Referee: Edwin Senai (Botswana)

7 October 2000

Madagascar	0–0	Nigeria

Alarobia Municipal Stadium, Antananarivo
Attendance: 7,000
Referee: Petros Mathabela (South Africa)
8 October 2000

Namibia	1–2	Zambia
Mukwaya 9'		Mwape 80'; Chepita 81'

Independence Stadium, Windhoek
Referee: Reda Baltagy (Egypt)

13 January 2001

Nigeria	1–0	Zambia
Agali 33'

Lagos National Stadium, Lagos
Attendance: 60,000
Referee: Kamel Berber (Algeria)
13 January 2001

Namibia	2–2	Madagascar
Hindjou 77'; Hummel 89'		Randrianaivo 33'; Ratsimialona 44'

Independence Stadium, Windhoek
Attendance: 5,000

24 March 2001

Zambia	1–1	Nigeria
Okoronkwo 42' (o.g.)		Akwuegbu 30'

Nchanga Stadium, Chingola
Attendance: 20,000
Referee: Wilfrid Mukuna (Zimbabwe)
24 March 2001

Madagascar	1–2	Namibia
Menakely 30'		Pienaar 5'; Diergaardt 10'

Mahamasina Municipal Stadium, Antananarivo
Attendance: 20,000

2 June 2001

Zambia	0–0	Namibia

Nchanga Stadium, Chingola
Attendance: 20,000
Referee: Edwin Senai (Botswana)
2 June 2001

Nigeria	1–0	Madagascar
Akwuegbu 4'

Benin City, Nigeria
Attendance: 15,000
Referee: Coffi Codjia (Benin)

16 June 2001

Namibia	0–2	Nigeria
		Yakubu 89'; Shuaibu 90'

Independence Stadium, Windhoek
Attendance: 10,000
Referee: Lim Kee Chong (Mauritius)
16 June 2001

Madagascar	0–1	Zambia
		Lungu 13'

Mahamasina Municipal Stadium, Antananarivo
Attendance: 25,000
Referee: Eddy Maillet (Seychelles)

=== Group 2 ===
Team	Pld	W	D	L	GF	GA	GD	Pts
Liberia	6	4	1	1	14	4	+10	13
South Africa	6	3	3	0	9	4	+5	12
Congo	6	1	2	3	4	9	−5	5
Mauritius	6	0	2	4	2	12	−10	2

3 September 2000

Liberia	4–0	Mauritius
Roberts 25'; Debbah 47', 49'; Sebwe

Samuel Kanyon Doe Sports Complex, Monrovia
Referee: Mamadouba Amalfi Camara (Guinea)
3 September 2000

Congo	1–2	South Africa
Guié-Mien 70' (pen.)		Mngomeni 21'; August 59'

Stade Municipal, Pointe Noire
Attendance: 25,000
Referee: Coffi Codjia (Benin)

8 October 2000

Mauritius	1–2	Congo
Ithier 47'		Guié-Mien 27', 29'

Stade George V, Curepipe
Attendance: 21,200
Referee: Wilfred Mukuna (Zimbabwe)
16 December 2000

South Africa	2–1	Liberia
Bartlett 49'; Masinga 73'		Daye 80'

First National Bank Stadium, Johannesburg
Attendance: 10,000
Referee: Mohamed Guezzaz (Morocco)

13 January 2001

Mauritius	1–1	South Africa
François 60' (pen.)		Buckley 43'

Stade Anjalay, Mauritius
Attendance: 11,260
Referee: Maxim Itur (Kenya)
14 January 2001

Liberia	5–1	Congo
Debbah 23', 60'; Makor 30'; Roberts 51'; Daye 62'		Bongo 21'

Samuel Kanyon Doe Sports Complex, Monrovia
Attendance: 50,000
Referee: Alex Quartey (Ghana)

24 March 2001

South Africa	3–0	Mauritius
McCarthy 4'; Phiri 14'; Zuma 20'

Telkom Park Stadium, Port Elizabeth
Attendance: 10,000
Referee: Ishak Omar Abdelkader (Tanzania)
25 March 2001

Congo	0–1	Liberia
		Daye 62'

Stade Municipal, Pointe Noire
Attendance: 20,000
Referee: Hissene Ladoual (Chad)

3 June 2001

Congo	0–0	Mauritius

Stade Municipal, Pointe Noire
Attendance: 10,000
3 June 2001

Liberia	1–1	South Africa
Makor 48' (pen.)		Rabutla 39'

Samuel Kanyon Doe Sports Complex, Monrovia
Attendance: 40,000
Referee: Lucien Bouchardeau (Niger)

16 June 2001

Mauritius	0–2	Liberia
		Tondo 1', 61'

Stade Anjalay, Mauritius
Attendance: 10,780
Referee: Samuel Moeketsi (Lesotho)
17 June 2001

South Africa	0–0	Congo

Kings Park Stadium, Durban
Attendance: 45,000
Referee: Wilson Mukuna (Zimbabwe)

=== Group 3 ===
Team	Pld	W	D	L	GF	GA	GD	Pts
Morocco	6	3	1	2	5	4	+1	10
Tunisia	6	2	2	2	9	7	+2	8
Gabon	6	2	2	2	8	8	0	8
Kenya	6	1	3	2	5	8	−3	6

2 September 2000

Gabon	2–0	Morocco
Nzeng 38'; Bito'o 56'

Stade Omar Bongo, Libreville
Attendance: 4,000
Referee: Sidi Bekaye Magassa (Mali)
3 September 2000

Kenya	0–0	Tunisia

Moi International Sports Centre, Nairobi
Attendance: 20,000
Referee: Mohammed Mahmoud (Somalia)

7 October 2000

Tunisia	4–2	Gabon
Jaziri 3'; Jaïdi 42'; Gabsi 58'; Thabet 75'		Moubamba 14'; Bito'o 25'

Stade El Menzah, Tunis
Attendance: 4,000
Referee: Karim Daho (Algeria)
8 October 2000

Morocco	1–0	Kenya
Chippo 43'

Mohamed V Stadium, Casablanca
Referee: Alex Quartey (Ghana)

13 January 2001

Tunisia	0–1	Morocco
		Camacho 49'

Stade El Menzah, Tunis
Attendance: 35,000
Referee: Gamal Al-Ghandour (Egypt)
13 January 2001

Kenya	2–1	Gabon
Maruti 16'; Mumba 72'		Nguema 12'

Moi International Sports Centre, Nairobi
Attendance: 10,000
Referee: Petros Mathabela (South Africa)

24 March 2001

Morocco	2–0	Tunisia
Chippo 20'; Camacho 60'

Prince Moulay Abdellah Stadium, Rabat
Attendance: 25,000
Referee: Coffi Codjia (Benin)
24 March 2001

Gabon	1–1	Kenya
Ondo 67' (pen.)		Wanyonyi 85'

Stade Omar Bongo, Libreville
Attendance: 45,000
Referee: Gilbert Njike (Cameroon)

2 June 2001

Kenya	1–1	Morocco
Origi 5'		Bassir 43'

Moi International Sports Centre, Nairobi
Attendance: 17,000
Referee: Robin Williams (South Africa)
2 June 2001

Gabon	1–1	Tunisia
Cousin 57'		Jelassi 67'

Stade Omar Bongo, Libreville
Attendance: 16,000
Referee: Chukwujekwu Chukwudi (Nigeria)

16 June 2001

Morocco	0–1	Gabon
		Nguema 43'

Complexe Hassan II, Fès
Attendance: 12,000
Referee: Mohamed Abdellah (Libya)
17 June 2001

Tunisia	4–1	Kenya
Zitouni 33', 62'; Jaziri 42', 44'		Mulama 61'

Stade El Menzah, Tunis
Attendance: 20,000
Referee: Kamel Berber (Algeria)

=== Group 4 ===
Team	Pld	W	D	L	GF	GA	GD	Pts
Algeria	6	3	2	1	9	7	+2	11
Burkina Faso	6	3	2	1	4	3	+1	11
Angola	6	2	2	2	8	7	+1	8
Burundi	6	0	2	4	2	6	−4	2

3 September 2000

Burundi	0–0	Angola

Prince Louis Rwagasore Stadium, Bujumbura
Attendance: 10,000
3 September 2000

Algeria	1–1	Burkina Faso
Tasfaout 62'		Zongo 52'

5 July stadium, Algiers
Attendance: 20,000
Referee: Hichem Guirat (Tunisia)

7 October 2000

Burkina Faso	1–0	Burundi
Sanou 52'

Stade du 4 Août, Ouagadougou
Attendance: 20,000
Referee: Olaniyan Olufemi (Nigeria)
8 October 2000

Angola	2–2	Algeria
P.Sousa 52'; Mendonça 66'		Tasfaout 10', 26'

Estádio da Cidadela, Luanda
Referee: Gilbert Njike (Cameroon)

12 January 2001

Algeria	2–1	Burundi
Ghazi 6'; Tasfaout 45'		Mossi 60'

5 July stadium, Algiers
Attendance: 20,000
Referee: Abdulhakim Al-Shelmani (Libya)
13 January 2001

Burkina Faso	1–0	Angola
Zongo 38'

Stade du 4 Août, Ouagadougou
Attendance: 25,000
Referee: Falla Ndoye (Senegal)

25 March 2001

Burundi	0–1	Algeria
		Bourahli 17'

Prince Louis Rwagasore Stadium, Bujumbura
Attendance: 10,000
Referee: Tessema Hailemalek (Ethiopia)
25 March 2001

Angola	2–0	Burkina Faso
Quinzinho 44'; Akwá 75'

Estádio da Cidadela, Luanda
Attendance: 25,000
Referee: Falla Ndoye (Senegal)

1 June 2001

Algeria	3–2	Angola
Saïfi 6', 41' (pen.); Kherkhache 80'		Quinzinho 29'; Joni 60'

19 May Stadium, Annaba
Attendance: 25,000
Referee: Mohamed Guezzaz (Morocco)
3 June 2001

Burundi	0–0	Burkina Faso

Prince Louis Rwagasore Stadium, Bujumbura
Attendance: 15,000
Referee: Yusuf Awuye (Uganda)

17 June 2001

Burkina Faso	1–0	Algeria
Traoré 38'

Stade du 4 Août, Ouagadougou
Attendance: 25,000
Referee: Komam Coulibaly (Mali)
17 June 2001

Angola	2–1	Burundi
Paulão 25'; Flávio 52'		Ndikumana 50'

Estádio Municipal do Tafe, Cabinda
Attendance: 10,000

=== Group 5 ===
Guinea were excluded on 19 March 2001, after the Guinean sports minister had failed to meet a third FIFA deadline to reinstall the Guinean FF functionaries.

Team	Pld	W	D	L	GF	GA	GD	Pts
Togo	4	3	1	0	7	0	+7	10
Senegal	4	1	2	1	4	2	+2	5
Uganda	4	0	1	3	1	10	−9	1
Guinea (W)	0	0	0	0	0	0	0	0

(W) Withdrew
2 September 2000

Uganda	3–1 (Annulled)	Guinea
Mubiru 14', 31'; Mukasa 77'		Feindouno 44'

Nakivubo Stadium, Kampala
Attendance: 30,000
24 September 2000

Senegal	0–0	Togo

Stade Léopold Sédar Senghor, Dakar
Referee: Alex Mana Sule (Nigeria)

8 October 2000

Togo	3–0	Uganda
Salou 29' (pen.); Kossi 49'; Mohamed Kader 73'

Stade de Kégué, Lomé
Attendance: 30,000
Referee: Chukwudi Chukwujekwu (Nigeria)
8 October 2000

Guinea	1–0 (Annulled)	Senegal
Baldé 59'

Stade du 28 Septembre, Conakry

13 January 2001

Uganda	1–1	Senegal
Kaweesa 69'		Thiaw 6'

Nakivubo Stadium, Kampala
Attendance: 25,000
Referee: Tessema Hailemelak (Ethiopia)

24 March 2001

Senegal	3–0	Uganda
Diouf 18', 85'; H. Camara 40'

Stade Léopold Sédar Senghor, Dakar
Attendance: 50,000
Referee: Joseph Wellington (Ghana)

2 June 2001

Uganda	0–3	Togo
		Mohamed Kader 34', 70'; Dogbe 48'

Nakivubo Stadium, Kampala
Attendance: 15,000
Referee: Abdulkadir Isaack Omar (Tanzania)

17 June 2001

Togo	1–0	Senegal
Kossi 32'

Stade de Kégué, Lomé
Attendance: 20,000
Referee: Alex Quartey (Ghana)

=== Group 6 ===
Team	Pld	W	D	L	GF	GA	GD	Pts
Ghana	6	4	1	1	16	8	+8	13
DR Congo	6	2	2	2	7	9	−2	8
Lesotho	6	1	3	2	7	9	−2	6
Zimbabwe	6	2	0	4	8	12	−4	6

3 September 2000

Zimbabwe	3–2	DR Congo
Petros 6', 73'; P. Ndlovu 22'		Mayélé 29' (pen.); Wakanyenkele 67'

National Stadium, Harare
Attendance: 25,000
Referee: Lim Kee Chong (Mauritius)
3 September 2000

Lesotho	3–3	Ghana
Lephoto 47'; Majara 49'; Makhele 61'		Amoah 27'; Duah 80', 88'

Setsoto Stadium, Maseru
Attendance: 11,000
Referee: Robin Williams (South Africa)

8 October 2000

Ghana	4–1	Zimbabwe
Appiah 28'; Duah 42'; Amoah 48'; Akunnor 78' (pen.)		Mwaruwari 47'

Accra Sports Stadium, Accra
Attendance: 60,000
Referee: Gamal Al-Ghandour (Egypt)
10 October 2000

DR Congo	1–1	Lesotho
Nvula 57'		Mpakanyane 65'

Stade des Martyrs, Kinshasa
Attendance: 50,000
Referee: Joseph Mandzioukouta (Congo)

14 January 2001

Zimbabwe	1–2	Lesotho
Mwaruwari 21'		Majara 40'; Seema 87' (pen.)

Barbourfields Stadium, Bulawayo
Attendance: 20,000
14 January 2001

DR Congo	2–1	Ghana
Dinzey 10'; Mbungu 13'		Ayew 77'

Stade des Martyrs, Kinshasa
Attendance: 80,000
Referee: Coffi Codjia (Benin)

24 March 2001

Lesotho	0–1	Zimbabwe
		P. Ndlovu 88'

Setsoto Stadium, Maseru
Attendance: 20,000
25 March 2001

Ghana	3–0	DR Congo
Allotey 17', 84'; Appiah 49'

Accra Sports Stadium, Accra
Attendance: 20,000
Referee: Gamal Al-Ghandour (Egypt)

3 June 2001

Lesotho	0–0	DR Congo

Setsoto Stadium, Maseru
Attendance: 20,000
Referee: Walter Mochubela (South Africa)
3 June 2001

Zimbabwe	1–2	Ghana
Mugeyi 15'		Owusu-Ansah 39'; Boakye 89'

National Stadium, Harare
Attendance: 35,000
Referee: Ahmed Auda (Egypt)

17 June 2001

DR Congo	2–1	Zimbabwe
Mulangu 54'; Mulekelayi 56'		Mwaruwari 7'

Stade des Martyrs, Kinshasa
Attendance: 40,000
Referee: Petros Mathabela (South Africa)
17 June 2001

Ghana	3–1	Lesotho
Appiah 25'; Gyan 31'; Amoah 37'		Nts'onyana 63'

Kumasi Sports Stadium, Kumasi
Attendance: 30,000
Referee: Moussa Kanouté (Mali)

=== Group 7 ===
Team	Pld	W	D	L	GF	GA	GD	Pts
Egypt	6	4	1	1	11	6	+5	13
Ivory Coast	6	3	2	1	9	4	+5	11
Libya	6	2	0	4	4	10	−6	6
Sudan	6	1	1	4	3	7	−4	4

2 September 2000

Egypt	1–0	Ivory Coast
Abdel Hafeez 15'

Alexandria Stadium, Alexandria
Attendance: 10,000
Referee: Hailemelak Tessema (Ethiopia)
10 September 2000

Libya	1–0	Sudan
Al-Masrati 44'

June 11 Stadium, Tripoli

8 October 2000

Sudan	0–1	Egypt
		H. Hassan 22'

Khartoum Stadium, Khartoum
Referee: Felix Tangawarima (Zimbabwe)
19 November 2000

Ivory Coast	2–1	Libya
Bakayoko 17'; Zoko 87'		Al Masli 8'

Stade Félix Houphouët-Boigny, Abidjan
Attendance: 20,000
Referee: Monteiro Duarte (Cape Verde)

14 January 2001

Egypt	4–0	Libya
I. Hassan 27'; A. Hassan 47', 62'; Sabry 66' (pen.)

Cairo International Stadium, Cairo
Attendance: 25,000
Referee: Abderrahim El Arjoun (Morocco)
20 January 2001

Ivory Coast	2–0	Sudan
Keïta 38'; Zoko 80'

Stade Bouaké, Bouaké
Referee: Malick Sillah (Gambia)

23 March 2001

Libya	2–0	Egypt
Al-Tawerghi 53'; Al Masli 65'

March 28 Stadium, Benghazi
Attendance: 25,000
Referee: Kamel Berber (Algeria)
25 March 2001

Sudan	0–0	Ivory Coast

Al-Merrikh Stadium, Omdurman
Referee: Berhane Teshome (Eritrea)

3 June 2001

Egypt	3–2	Sudan
A. Hossam 20', 51'; Hosni 58'		Moga 69'; Faroug Jabra 89' (pen.)

Alexandria Stadium, Alexandria
Attendance: 13,000
Referee: Mohsen Boukthir (Tunisia)
3 June 2001

Libya	0–3	Ivory Coast
		Keïta 21'; Bakayoko 31'; Ettien 67'

June 11 Stadium, Tripoli

17 June 2001

Ivory Coast	2–2	Egypt
Bakayoko 70' (pen.); El-Sayed 83' (o.g.)		Hosni 56'; Said 84'

Stade Félix Houphouët-Boigny, Abidjan
Attendance: 6,000
Referee: Hailemalik Tessema (Ethiopia)
17 June 2001

Sudan	1–0	Libya
Edward Jildo 45'

Khartoum Stadium, Khartoum
