= 2008 Africa Cup of Nations qualification =

Football matches

This page details the process of qualifying for the 2008 Africa Cup of Nations.

== Qualified teams ==
The 16 qualified teams were:

- Ghana as hosts.
- Ivory Coast as group 1 winner.
- Egypt as group 2 winner.
- Nigeria as group 3 winner.
- Sudan as group 4 winner.
- Cameroon as group 5 winner.
- Angola as group 6 winner.
- Senegal as group 7 winner.
- Guinea as group 8 winner.
- Mali as group 9 winner.
- Namibia as group 10 winner.
- Zambia as group 11 winner.
- Morocco as group 12 winner.
- Tunisia, Benin, and South Africa as the three best runners-up from groups 2–11.

== Teams that did not enter ==
(FIFA World Ranking of 16 May 2007)

- Central African Republic [180]
- Comoros [182]
- Somalia [192]
- São Tomé and Príncipe [199]

== Team Excluded ==
(FIFA World Ranking of 16 May 2007)

- Guinea-Bissau [187] had their entry rejected as they had unpaid debts to CAF.

== Qualifying round ==
The 47 nations were divided into 11 groups of four teams and 1 group of 3 teams, with the 12 group winners and the best 3 runners-up from groups with four teams (originally groups 1–11, now groups 2–11 after the withdrawal of Djibouti from group 1) qualifying for the finals. Qualifying took place between 2 September 2006 and 13 October 2007.

=== Group 1 ===
On 17 August 2006, the Djiboutian Football Federation announced that the Djibouti national team was withdrawing from the qualifying tournament, without giving a reason. All Djibouti matches were therefore cancelled.

Team	Pld	W	D	L	GF	GA	GD	Pts
Ivory Coast	4	3	1	0	13	0	+13	10
Gabon	4	2	1	1	6	5	+1	7
Madagascar	4	0	0	4	0	14	−14	0
Djibouti (W)	0	0	0	0	0	0	0	0

(W) Withdrew
2 September 2006

Gabon	4–0	Madagascar
Antchouet 40'; Cousin 67' (pen.); N'Zigou 76', 82'

Stade Omar Bongo, Libreville
Attendance: 3,000

8 October 2006

Ivory Coast	5–0	Gabon
K. Touré 10'; Koné 22', 55', 70'; Dindane 32'

Stade Félix Houphouët-Boigny, Abidjan

25 March 2007

Madagascar	0–3	Ivory Coast
		Gohouri 29'; Dindane 35'; Diané 82'

Stade Municipal de Mahamasina, Antananarivo

3 June 2007

Ivory Coast	5–0	Madagascar
Kalou 18'; Koné 30', 82'; Y. Touré 48'; Drogba 90'

Stade Bouaké, Bouaké
Attendance: 25,000

17 June 2007

Madagascar	0–2	Gabon
		Akieremy 20'; Méyé 89'

Stade Municipal de Mahamasina, Antananarivo

8 September 2007

Gabon	0–0	Ivory Coast

Stade Omar Bongo, Libreville

=== Group 2 ===
Team	Pld	W	D	L	GF	GA	GD	Pts
Egypt	6	3	3	0	9	2	+7	12
Mauritania	6	2	1	3	9	10	−1	7
Burundi	6	2	1	3	6	8	−2	7
Botswana	6	2	1	3	3	7	−4	7

2 September 2006

Egypt	4–1	Burundi
Zidan 5'; Hosny 29'; Aboutrika 31'; Hassan 52' (pen.)		Se. Ndikumana 79' (pen.)

Cairo International Stadium, Cairo
2 September 2006

Mauritania	4–0	Botswana
Mbodjj 2'; Moussa 10', 23'; Langlet 31'

Stade Olympique, Nouakchott

7 October 2006

Botswana	0–0	Egypt

Botswana National Stadium, Gaborone
8 October 2006

Burundi	3–1	Mauritania
Sa. Ndikumana 3', 30'; Mbazumutima 45'		Benyachou 7'

Stade Prince Louis Rwagasore, Bujumbura

25 March 2007

Botswana	1–0	Burundi
Siska 57'

Botswana National Stadium, Gaborone
25 March 2007

Egypt	3–0	Mauritania
Zidan 20'; Sidibé 23' (o.g.); Ghaly 66'

Cairo International Stadium, Cairo

3 June 2007

Burundi	1–0	Botswana
Hakimana 63'

Stade Amahoro, Kigali
3 June 2007

Mauritania	1–1	Egypt
Langlet 67'		Hassan 15'

Stade Olympique, Nouakchott

16 June 2007

Botswana	2–1	Mauritania
Marumo 19'; Selolwane 40'		Langlet 75'

Botswana National Stadium, Gaborone

9 September 2007

Burundi	0–0	Egypt

Stade Prince Louis Rwagasore, Bujumbura

13 October 2007

Egypt	1–0	Botswana
Fadl 77'

Cairo International Stadium, Cairo
13 October 2007

Mauritania	2–1	Burundi
Corville 32'; Teguedi 50'		Imantona 85' (pen.)

Stade Olympique, Nouakchott

=== Group 3 ===
Team	Pld	W	D	L	GF	GA	GD	Pts
Nigeria	6	5	0	1	10	3	+7	15
Uganda	6	3	2	1	8	3	+5	11
Niger	6	1	1	4	5	11	−6	4
Lesotho	6	1	1	4	3	9	−6	4

2 September 2006

Uganda	3–0	Lesotho
Massa 29', 42'; Obua 57' (pen.)

Nelson Mandela National Stadium, Kampala
2 September 2006

Nigeria	2–0	Niger
Yakubu 27'; Obodo 60'

Abuja Stadium, Abuja

8 October 2006

Lesotho	0–1	Nigeria
		Yakubu 50'

Setsoto Stadium, Maseru
8 October 2006

Niger	0–0	Uganda

Général Seyni Kountché Stadion, Niamey

24 March 2007

Nigeria	1–0	Uganda
Kanu 73'

MKO Abiola Stadium, Abeokuta
25 March 2007

Lesotho	3–1	Niger
Potse 22', 44'; Marai 75'		Kamilou 80'

Setsoto National Stadium, Maseru

2 June 2007

Uganda	2–1	Nigeria
Obua 52' (pen.); Sekagya 65' (pen.)		Utaka 25'

Nelson Mandela National Stadium, Kampala
3 June 2007

Niger	2–0	Lesotho
Djibo 10'; Sacko 36'

Général Seyni Kountché Stadion, Niamey

17 June 2007

Niger	1–3	Nigeria
Kamilou 68'		Kanu 40'; Taiwo 70'; Yakubu 89'

Général Seyni Kountché Stadion, Niamey
19 June 2007

Lesotho	0–0	Uganda

Setsoto National Stadium, Maseru

8 September 2007

Nigeria	2–0	Lesotho
Makinwa 42'; Uche 73'

Warri Township Stadium, Warri
8 September 2007

Uganda	3–1	Niger
Obua 2' (pen.), 77', 86'		Idrissa 45'

Nelson Mandela National Stadium, Kampala

=== Group 4 ===
Team	Pld	W	D	L	GF	GA	GD	Pts
Sudan	6	5	0	1	13	4	+9	15
Tunisia	6	4	1	1	12	3	+9	13
Seychelles	6	1	1	4	3	14	−11	4
Mauritius	6	0	2	4	3	10	−7	2

3 September 2006

Mauritius	0–0	Tunisia

Stade George V, Curepipe
3 September 2006

Sudan	3–0	Seychelles
Galag 22'; Tambal 77' (pen.), 90'

Khartoum Stadium, Khartoum

7 October 2006

Seychelles	2–1	Mauritius
Brutus 22', 81'		Godon 50'

Stade Linité, Victoria
7 October 2006

Tunisia	1–0	Sudan
Lado 79' (o.g.)

Stade 7 Novembre, Radès

24 March 2007

Seychelles	0–3	Tunisia
		Jemâa 16', 76', 80'

Stade Linité, Victoria
25 March 2007

Mauritius	1–2	Sudan
Naboth 68'		Agab 42', 86'

Stade George V, Curepipe

2 June 2007

Sudan	3–0	Mauritius
Lado 24', 65'; Agab 44'

Al Merreikh Stadium, Omdurman
2 June 2007

Tunisia	4–0	Seychelles
Jemâa 25'; Zaiem 41', 66'; Chermiti 81'

Stade 7 Novembre, Radès

16 June 2007

Seychelles	0–2	Sudan
		Agab 46'; Tambal 61'

Stade Linité, Victoria
16 June 2007

Tunisia	2–0	Mauritius
Jemâa 44'; Nafti 60'

Stade 7 Novembre, Radès

9 September 2007

Mauritius	1–1	Seychelles
Perle 59'		Godfrey 43' (pen.)

Stade George V, Curepipe
9 September 2007

Sudan	3–2	Tunisia
Alaa Eldin Babiker 26'; Agab 61' (pen.); Mousa 72'		Tafti 55'; Santos 82' (pen.)

Khartoum Stadium, Khartoum

=== Group 5 ===
Team	Pld	W	D	L	GF	GA	GD	Pts
Cameroon	6	5	0	1	13	4	+9	15
Equatorial Guinea	6	3	1	2	6	7	−1	10
Rwanda	6	2	0	4	10	11	−1	6
Liberia	6	1	1	4	6	13	−7	4

3 September 2006

Rwanda	0–3	Cameroon
		Feutchine 55'; Geremi 62'; Nguemo 84'

Stade Amahoro, Kigali
3 September 2006

Equatorial Guinea	2–1	Liberia
J. Epitié 24'; Bodipo 88'		Zah Rahan 35'

Estadio Internacional, Malabo

7 October 2006

Cameroon	3–0	Equatorial Guinea
Idrissou 72', 89'; Webó 80'

Stade Omnisports Ahmadou Ahidjo, Yaoundé
8 October 2006

Liberia	3–2	Rwanda
Doe 24'; Makor 68'; Williams 76'		Karekezi 70'; Mulenda 82'

Antoinette Tubman Stadium, Monrovia

24 March 2007

Cameroon	3–1	Liberia
Webó 12', 24'; Idrissou 86'		Doe 38'

Stade Omnisports Ahmadou Ahidjo, Yaoundé
25 March 2007

Equatorial Guinea	3–1	Rwanda
Neles 10'; Juvenal 75'; J. Epitié 83'		Karekezi 17'

Estadio Internacional, Malabo

2 June 2007

Rwanda	2–0	Equatorial Guinea
Niyonzima 57', 77'

Stade Amahoro, Kigali
3 June 2007

Liberia	1–2	Cameroon
Mennoh 80'		Mbia 12'; Eto'o 78'

Antoinette Tubman Stadium, Monrovia

17 June 2007

Cameroon	2–1	Rwanda
Idrissou 16'; Geremi 49'		Gatete 79'

Stade Omnisports Roumdé Adjia, Garoua
17 June 2007

Liberia	0–0	Equatorial Guinea

Antoinette Tubman Stadium, Monrovia

8 September 2007

Rwanda	4–0	Liberia
Bokota 21'; Makasi 29'; Witakenge 85'; Karekezi 89'

Stade Amahoro, Kigali
9 September 2007

Equatorial Guinea	1–0	Cameroon
Juvenal 35'

Estadio de Malabo, Malabo

=== Group 6 ===
Team	Pld	W	D	L	GF	GA	GD	Pts
Angola	6	4	1	1	16	5	+11	13
Eritrea	6	2	3	1	5	8	−3	9
Kenya	6	2	1	3	6	7	−1	7
Swaziland	6	0	3	3	0	7	−7	3

2 September 2006

Kenya	1–2	Eritrea
Mambo Mumba 65'		Origi 60' (o.g.); Shimangus 68'

Moi International Sports Centre, Nairobi
3 September 2006

Swaziland	0–2	Angola
		Jamba 21'; Locó 80'

Somhlolo National Stadium, Lobamba

7 October 2006

Eritrea	0–0	Swaziland

Asmara Stadium, Asmara
8 October 2006

Angola	3–1	Kenya
Flávio 27', 68'; Mateus 60'		Ambani 81'

Estadio Nacional da Cidadela Desportiva, Luanda

25 March 2007

Angola	6–1	Eritrea
Flávio 26', 69'; Mantorras 35'; Zé Kalanga 41'; Mendonça 51'; Figueiredo 80'		Tenese Gay 58'

Estadio Nacional da Cidadela Desportiva, Luanda
25 March 2007

Kenya	2–0	Swaziland
Mariga 51'; Shikanda 75'

Nyayo National Stadium, Nairobi

2 June 2007

Eritrea	1–1	Angola
Abubeker 17'		Maurito 88'

Asmara Stadium, Asmara
3 June 2007

Swaziland	0–0	Kenya

Somhlolo National Stadium, Lobamba

16 June 2007

Eritrea	1–0	Kenya
Aregay 80'

Asmara Stadium, Asmara
17 June 2007

Angola	3–0	Swaziland
Figueiredo 18'; Love 25'; Flávio 56'

Estadio Nacional da Cidadela Desportiva, Luanda

8 September 2007

Kenya	2–1	Angola
Boya 18'; Oliech 87'		Manucho 35'

Nyayo National Stadium, Nairobi
9 September 2007

Swaziland	0–0	Eritrea

Trade Fair Ground, Manzini

=== Group 7 ===
Team	Pld	W	D	L	GF	GA	GD	Pts
Senegal	6	3	2	1	12	3	+9	11
Mozambique	6	2	3	1	5	4	+1	9
Tanzania	6	2	2	2	4	7	−3	8
Burkina Faso	6	1	1	4	5	12	−7	4

2 September 2006

Tanzania	2–1	Burkina Faso
Koulibaly 23' (o.g.); Khalfan 65'		Cissé 39'

National Stadium, Dar es Salaam
2 September 2006

Senegal	2–0	Mozambique
Nando 33' (o.g.); Ndaw 61'

Stade Leopold Senghor, Dakar

7 October 2006

Burkina Faso	1–0	Senegal
Yameogo 63' (pen.)

Stade du 4-Août, Ouagadougou
8 October 2006

Mozambique	0–0	Tanzania

Estádio da Machava, Maputo

24 March 2007

Senegal	4–0	Tanzania
Niang 35', 49', 64'; Kamara 46'

Stade Leopold Sedar Senghor, Dakar
24 March 2007

Burkina Faso	1–1	Mozambique
Pitroipa 36'		Mano 2'

Stade du 4-Août, Ouagadougou

2 June 2007

Tanzania	1–1	Senegal
Khalfan 18'		Ba 75'

CCM Kirumba Stadium, Mwanza
3 June 2007

Mozambique	3–1	Burkina Faso
Monteiro 7'; Tico-Tico 42', 48'		Sanou 38'

Estádio da Machava, Maputo

16 June 2007

Burkina Faso	0–1	Tanzania
		Nyoni 77'

Stade du 4-Août, Ouagadougou
17 June 2007

Mozambique	0–0	Senegal

Estádio da Machava, Maputo

8 September 2007

Senegal	5–1	Burkina Faso
N'Daw 28'; N'Doye 69'; Camara 73', 83'; Diouf 87'		Traoré 40'

Stade Leopold Sedar Senghor, Dakar
8 September 2007

Tanzania	0–1	Mozambique
		Tico-Tico 8'

Benjamin Mkapa National Stadium, Dar es Salaam

=== Group 8 ===
Team	Pld	W	D	L	GF	GA	GD	Pts
Guinea	6	3	2	1	10	3	+7	11
Algeria	6	2	2	2	6	6	0	8
Gambia	6	2	2	2	6	6	0	8
Cape Verde	6	1	2	3	3	10	−7	5

3 September 2006

Gambia	2–0	Cape Verde
Ceesay 8' (pen.); Jatta 88'

Independence Stadium, Bakau
3 September 2006

Guinea	0–0	Algeria

Stade 28 Septembre, Conakry

7 October 2006

Algeria	1–0	Gambia
Ziani 75' (pen.)

Stade 5 Juillet 1962, Algiers
7 October 2006

Cape Verde	1–0	Guinea
Lito 52'

Estádio da Várzea, Praia

24 March 2007

Gambia	0–2	Guinea
		Diawara 50'; Feindouno 70'

Independence Stadium, Bakau
24 March 2007

Algeria	2–0	Cape Verde
Deham 60'; Meniri 89'

Stade 5 Juillet 1962, Algiers

2 June 2007

Cape Verde	2–2	Algeria
Soares 65'; Borges 90'		Bougherra 33'; Saifi 84'

Estádio da Várzea, Praia
3 June 2007

Guinea	2–2	Gambia
Diallo 10'; Mansaré 53'		Sonko 51'; Jagne 71'

Stade 28 Septembre, Conakry

16 June 2007

Algeria	0–2	Guinea
		Mansaré 43'; Feindouno 84'

Stade 5 Juillet 1962, Algiers
16 June 2007

Cape Verde	0–0	Gambia

Estádio da Várzea, Praia

9 September 2007

Gambia	2–1	Algeria
Jatta 75' (pen.), 86'		Saifi 58'

Independence Stadium, Bakau
9 September 2007

Guinea	4–0	Cape Verde
Feindouno 19'; Cissé 32'; Camara 39'; Bangoura 45'

Stade 28 Septembre, Conakry

=== Group 9 ===
Team	Pld	W	D	L	GF	GA	GD	Pts
Mali	6	3	3	0	10	1	+9	12
Benin	6	3	2	1	10	4	+6	11
Togo	6	3	0	3	7	9	−2	9
Sierra Leone	6	0	1	5	1	14	−13	1

3 September 2006

Sierra Leone	0–0	Mali

National Stadium, Freetown
3 September 2006

Togo	2–1	Benin
Dossevi 15'; Amewou 75'		Tchomogo 83'

Stade de Kégué, Lome

8 October 2006

Benin	2–0	Sierra Leone
Chitou 22'; Ogunbiyi 77'

Stade de l'Amitié, Cotonou
8 October 2006

Mali	1–0	Togo
Traoré 90+1'

Stade 26 mars, Bamako

24 March 2007

Togo	3–1	Sierra Leone
Adebayor 37', 85'; Olufade 62'		Wobay 77'

Stade de Kégué, Lome
25 March 2007

Mali	1–1	Benin
Kanouté 47' (pen.)		Ogunbiyi 44'

Stade 26 mars, Bamako

3 June 2007

Sierra Leone	0–1	Togo
		senaya 78'

National Stadium, Freetown
3 June 2007

Benin	0–0	Mali

Stade de l'Amitié, Cotonou

17 June 2007

Benin	4–1	Togo
Omotoyossi 44', 52'; Sessègnon 47'; Ogunbiyi 58'		Olufade 75'

Stade de l'Amitié, Cotonou
17 June 2007

Mali	6–0	Sierra Leone
Sidibé 22' (pen.); Keita 68', 87'; M. Diallo 76'; L. Diallo 89'; Basala 90'

Stade 26 mars, Bamako

12 October 2007

Sierra Leone	0–2	Benin
		Tchomogo 9', 63'

National Stadium, Freetown
12 October 2007

Togo	0–2	Mali
		Kanouté 41'; M. Diallo 90'

Stade de Kégué, Lome

=== Group 10 ===
Team	Pld	W	D	L	GF	GA	GD	Pts
Namibia	6	3	1	2	9	8	+1	10
DR Congo	6	2	3	1	8	6	+2	9
Libya	6	2	2	2	7	6	+1	8
Ethiopia	6	2	0	4	5	9	−4	6

3 September 2006

Ethiopia	1–0	Libya
Mebratu 15'

Addis Abeba Stadium, Addis Ababa
3 September 2006

DR Congo	3–2	Namibia
Mbele 31'; Kalulika 67'; Kinkela 80'		Plaatjies 37', 60'

Stade des Martyrs, Kinshasa

7 October 2006

Namibia	1–0	Ethiopia
Jacobs 18' (pen.)

Sam Nujoma Stadium, Windhoek
8 October 2006

Libya	1–1	DR Congo
Hussein 63'		Bageta 40'

June 11 Stadium, Tripoli

25 March 2007

Libya	2–1	Namibia
Al Rewani 12'; El Taib 61'		Helu 88'

June 11 Stadium, Tripoli
29 April 2007

DR Congo	2–0	Ethiopia
Mbungu 29'; LuaLua 52' (pen.)

Stade des Martyrs, Kinshasa

1 June 2007

Ethiopia	1–0	DR Congo
Said 30'

Addis Abeba Stadium, Addis Ababa
2 June 2007

Namibia	1–0	Libya
Benjamin 5'

Sam Nujoma Stadium, Windhoek

16 June 2007

Namibia	1–1	DR Congo
Pienaar 40'		Matumona 27'

Sam Nujoma Stadium, Windhoek
17 June 2007

Libya	3–1	Ethiopia
Zuway 11', 48'; Al Rewani 23'		Tefera 59'

June 11 Stadium, Tripoli

8 September 2007

DR Congo	1–1	Libya
Nonda 39' (pen.)		Hussein 51'

Stade des Martyrs, Kinshasa
8 September 2007

Ethiopia	2–3	Namibia
Bogale 44'; Said 67'		Bester 64', 82'; Katupose 86'

Addis Abeba Stadium, Addis Ababa

=== Group 11 ===
Zambia finished as group winner by winning the head-to-head against South Africa.

Team	Pld	W	D	L	GF	GA	GD	Pts
Zambia	6	3	2	1	9	3	+6	11
South Africa	6	3	2	1	10	4	+6	11
Congo	6	1	4	1	5	6	−1	7
Chad	6	0	2	4	3	14	−11	2

2 September 2006

South Africa	0–0	Congo

First National Bank Stadium, Johannesburg
3 September 2006

Chad	0–2	Zambia
		Chamanga 47'; Phiri 58'

Stade Omnisports Idriss Mahamat Ouya, N'Djamena

8 October 2006

Congo	3–1	Chad
Abdoulaye 17'; Malonga 29'; N'Guessi 46'		Betolngar 89'

Stade Alphonse Massemba-Débat, Brazzaville
8 October 2006

Zambia	0–1	South Africa
		Makoena 28'

Independence Stadium, Lusaka

24 March 2007

Chad	0–3	South Africa
		Moriri 32'; Buckley 45+'; Zuma 76'

Stade Omnisports Idriss Mahamat Ouya, N'Djamena
25 March 2007

Congo	0–0	Zambia

Stade Alphonse Massemba-Débat, Brazzaville

2 June 2007

South Africa	4–0	Chad
Morris 13'; Zuma 23', 33'; Nomvethe 74'

Absa Stadium, Durban
2 June 2007

Zambia	3–0	Congo
Mulenga 22'; Ngo 74' (o.g.); Chalwe 87'

Konkola Stadium, Chililabombwe

16 June 2007

Zambia	1–1	Chad
Mbesuma 57'		Kedigui 13'

Konkola Stadium, Chililabombwe
17 June 2007

Congo	1–1	South Africa
Bantsimba 59'		Zuma 51'

Stade Municipal, Pointe-Noire

9 September 2007

Chad	1–1	Congo
Djimrangar 90'		Mayimbi 6'

Stade Omnisports Idriss Mahamat Ouya, N'Djamena
9 September 2007

South Africa	1–3	Zambia
McCarthy 51'		Katongo 6', 28', 30'

Newlands Stadium, Cape Town

=== Group 12 ===
Team	Pld	W	D	L	GF	GA	GD	Pts
Morocco	4	3	1	0	6	1	+5	10
Zimbabwe	4	1	1	2	4	5	−1	4
Malawi	4	1	0	3	2	6	−4	3

2 September 2006

Morocco	2–0	Malawi
Chamakh 50'; Boussoufa 72'

Stade Moulay Abdellah, Rabat

7 October 2006

Malawi	1–0	Zimbabwe
Chavula 33'

Kamuzu Stadium, Blantyre

25 March 2007

Zimbabwe	1–1	Morocco
Nyandoro 82'		Hadji 7'

Rufaro Stadium, Harare

2 June 2007

Morocco	2–0	Zimbabwe
Chamakh 3'; Hadji 26'

Stade Mohamed V, Casablanca

16 June 2007

Malawi	0–1	Morocco
		El Moubarki 12'

Kamuzu Stadium, Blantyre

9 September 2007

Zimbabwe	3–1	Malawi
Nkhatha 24'; Mteki 54'; Mwanjali 61'		Kanyenda 43'

Barbourfields Stadium, Bulawayo

=== Best runners-up (groups 2-11) ===
The best 3 runners-up from groups with four teams (groups 2-11) would qualify for the finals.

Team	Pld	W	D	L	GF	GA	GD	Pts
Tunisia	6	4	1	1	12	3	+9	13
Benin	6	3	2	1	10	4	+6	11
South Africa	6	3	2	1	10	4	+6	11
Uganda	6	3	2	1	8	3	+5	11
Equatorial Guinea	6	3	1	2	6	7	−1	10
DR Congo	6	2	3	1	8	6	+2	9
Mozambique	6	2	3	1	5	4	+1	9
Eritrea	6	2	3	1	5	8	−3	9
Algeria	6	2	2	2	6	6	0	8
Mauritania	6	2	1	3	9	10	−1	7

== Top goalscorers ==
Scorer	Goals	Nation	Club
Arouna Koné	5	Ivory Coast	(Spain) Sevilla
David Obua	5	Uganda	(South Africa) Kaizer Chiefs
Faisal Agab	5	Sudan	(Sudan) Al-Merreikh
Flávio	5	Angola	(Egypt) Al Ahly
Issam Jemâa	5	Tunisia	(France) Caen
Mohammadou Idrissou	4	Cameroon	(Germany) MSV Duisburg
Sibusiso Zuma	4	South Africa	(Germany) Arminia Bielefeld
Pascal Feindouno	3	Guinea	(France) Saint-Étienne
Yakubu	3	Nigeria	(England) Everton
Chris Katongo	3	Zambia	(Denmark) Brøndby

Source: Official site - qualifying
