= Yoann Langlet =

Association football player (born 1982)

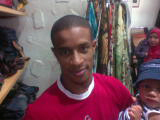

Personal information
- Full name: Yoann-Jean-Noël Langlet
- Date of birth: 25 December 1982 (age 43)
- Place of birth: Le Port, Réunion, France
- Height: 1.65 m (5 ft 5 in)
- Position: Midfielder

Senior career*
Years	Team	Apps	(Gls)
1999–2001	Bordeaux B	6	(1)
2002–2003	Stade Lavallois	16	(0)
2003–2004	Baulmes	15	(10)
2004–2005	Sion	27	(5)
2005–2006	Baulmes	32	(2)
2006–2007	Vaduz	26	(1)
2007–2008	Al-Ittihad Tripoli	19	(5)
2008	Fribourg	12	(5)
2009	Stade Nyonnais	12	(1)
2009–2010	Ionikos	29	(0)
2010–2011	Thrasyvoulos	11	(2)
2011–2012	Veria	28	(1)
2012–2013	Enosis Neon Paralimni	16	(1)
2013–2014	Fribourg	8	(0)
2014	Monthey		
2014–2015	Aigle		
2015–2016	Vevey United		
2016–2017	Monthey		

International career
2003–2008	Mauritania	11	(4)
- * Club domestic league appearances and goals

Yoann-Jean-Noël Langlet (born 25 December 1982) is a former professional footballer who played as a midfielder. Born in Réunion, an overseas department and region of France in the Indian Ocean, he represented the Mauritania national team internationally.

== Club career ==
Langlet has played for clubs in France, Switzerland, Libya and Greece.

== International career ==
In 2003, Langlet agreed to become a naturalized citizen of Mauritania, following an invitation by fellow Frenchman Noel Tosi, who was then the Mauritania national team manager and wanted him in the squad.

== Career statistics ==
Scores and results list Mauritania's goal tally first.

No.	Date	Venue	Opponent	Score	Result	Competition
1.	14 November 2003	Stade Olympique, Nouakchott, Mauritania	Zimbabwe	1–0	2–1	2006 FIFA World Cup qualification
2.	3 September 2006	Stade Olympique, Nouakchott, Mauritania	Botswana	4–0	4–0	2008 Africa Cup of Nations qualification
3.	3 June 2007	Stade Olympique, Nouakchott, Mauritania	Egypt	1–0	1–1	2008 Africa Cup of Nations qualification
4.	16 June 2007	Botswana National Stadium, Gaborone, Botswana	Botswana	1–2	1–2	2008 Africa Cup of Nations qualification
