= Karl Gall (footballer) =

Austrian footballer (1905–1943)

Personal information
- Date of birth: 5 October 1905
- Place of birth: Vienna, Austria
- Date of death: 27 February 1943 (aged 37)
- Place of death: near Staraya Russa, Soviet Union
- Position: Midfielder

Senior career*
Years	Team	Apps	(Gls)
-1928	HAC-Nordstern		
1928-1936	Austria Wien		
1936-1939	Mulhouse		
1939-1942	Austria Wien		

International career
1931–1936	Austria	11	(0)
- * Club domestic league appearances and goals

Karl Gall (5 October 1905 – 27 February 1943) was an Austrian footballer who played as a midfielder. He made eleven appearances for the Austria national team from 1931 to 1936.

== Personal life ==
Gall served as a Gefreiter (lance corporal) in the German Army during the Second World War. He was killed in action on the Eastern Front on 27 February 1943.
