= Stade de l'Ill =

Multi-purpose stadium in Mulhouse, France

Coordinates: 47.7381°N 7.32111°E

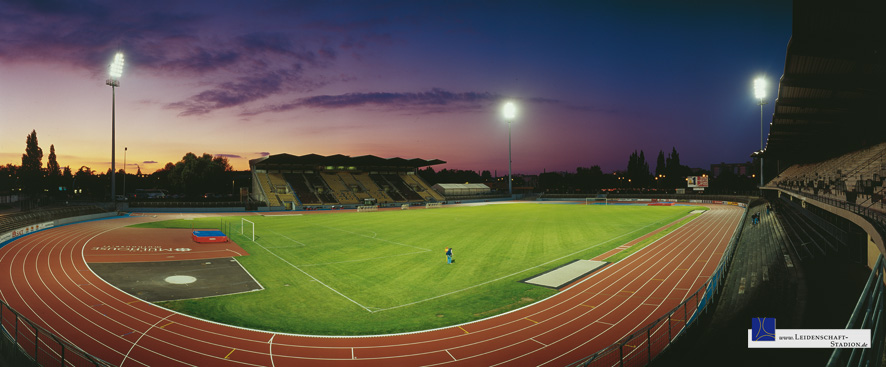
- Interactive map of Stade de l'Ill
- Location: Mulhouse, France
- Capacity: 7,871
- Surface: Grass

Construction
- Opened: 11 August 1979

Tenant
- FC Mulhouse

The Stade de l'Ill is a multi-purpose stadium in Mulhouse, France. Home to FC Mulhouse, it has a capacity of 7,871.
