= Sibusiso Zuma =

South African footballer (born 1975)

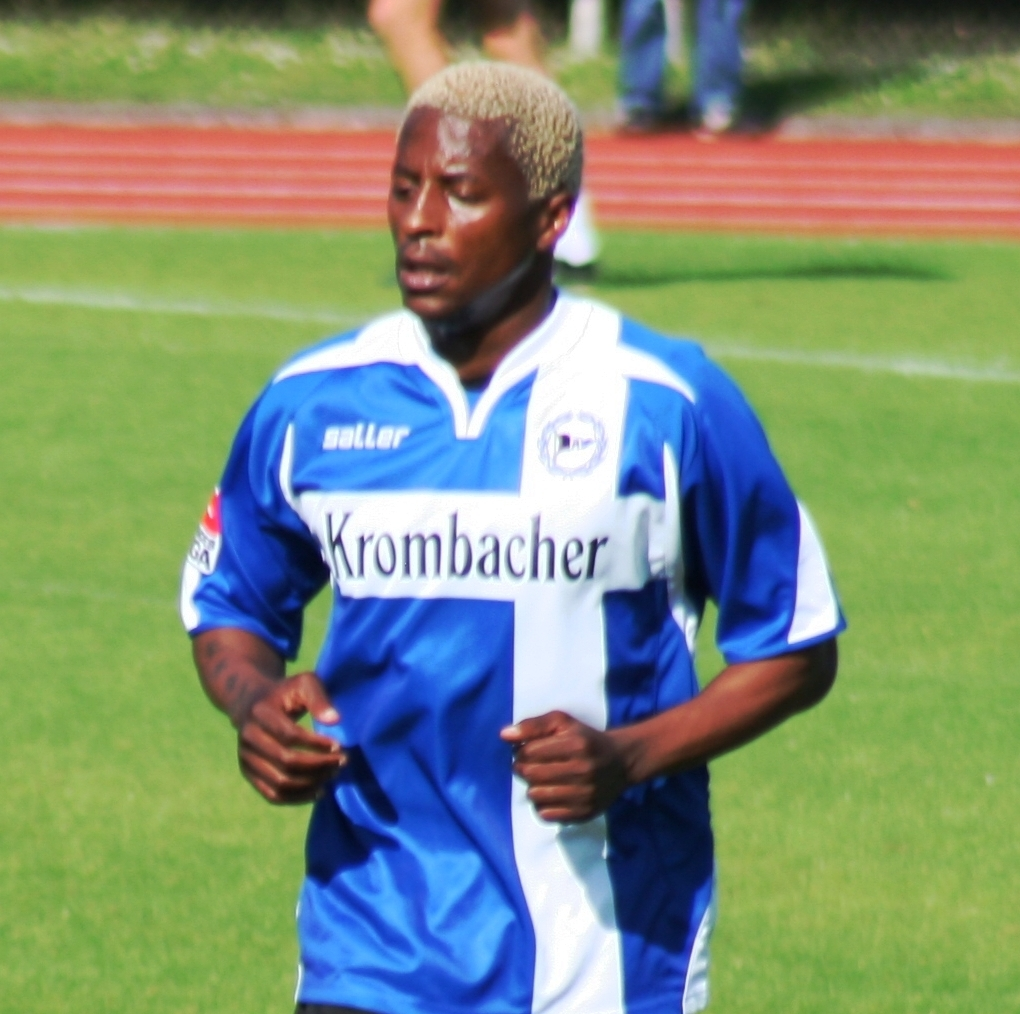
- Zuma with Arminia Bielefeld in 2007

Personal information
- Full name: Sibusiso Wiseman Zuma
- Date of birth: 23 June 1975 (age 51)
- Place of birth: Durban, South Africa
- Height: 1.80 m (5 ft 11 in)
- Positions: Striker; attacking midfielder; right winger

Youth career
- Mighty Pa

Senior career*
Years	Team	Apps	(Gls)
1995–1998	African Wanderers	71	(29)
1998–2000	Orlando Pirates	70	(37)
2000–2005	F.C. Copenhagen	145	(40)
2005–2008	Arminia Bielefeld	69	(8)
2008–2009	Mamelodi Sundowns	12	(1)
2009–2010	Nordsjælland	13	(1)
2010–2011	Vasco da Gama	27	(11)
2011–2015	SuperSport United	39	(6)
Total		446	(133)

International career
1998–2008	South Africa	66	(13)
- * Club domestic league appearances and goals

Sibusiso Wiseman Zuma (born 23 June 1975) is a South African former professional soccer player who played as a forward or midfielder.

== Club career ==
=== Early career ===
Born in Durban, KwaZulu-Natal, Zuma started his career for South African clubs Mighty Pa, African Wanderers and Orlando Pirates.

=== F.C. Copenhagen ===
In June 2000, Zuma joined Danish club F.C. Copenhagen, where he blossomed as a player.

In 2001 Zuma was tied for 29th place for the 2001 FIFA World Player of the Year award, for his performance in the 2000–01 season.

He helped the club win its second Danish football championship in the 2000–01 season, where Copenhagen won the Copenhagen Derby 3–1 in the last match of the season. He scored a bicycle kick that match, volleying the ball into the top corner out of Brøndby keeper Mogens Krogh's reach. This was later voted the Danish goal of the year, and was voted the best Superliga goal of the decade in December 2009.

Zuma was voted into the club's hall of fame for his outstanding efforts in the 2004–05 season. In 2006 Zuma was voted number one by the fans among the greatest profiles to have ever played in F.C. Copenhagen.

In March 2013, FCK TV visited Zuma back in his home country for an interview, where he stated, "I enjoyed every day at the club", that he is very thankful and "owes everything to the club." Later that year, Zuma's bicycle kick was voted the greatest moment in the history of F.C. Copenhagen. As a result, a monument was created to honor Zuma. Zuma himself was invited by F.C. Copenhagen and attended Parken Stadium on 18 August 2013 where the unveiling of the monument took place, which is a replica of his bicycle kick.

=== Arminia Bielefeld ===
After five and a half years at FC Copenhagen, Zuma was sold to German Bundesliga club Arminia Bielefeld for €1 million in July 2005.

=== Mamelodi Sundowns ===
On 21 June 2008, Zuma signed for Mamelodi Sundowns. He was released in the summer of 2009 and in October 2009 he had a trial period with FC Nordsjælland, eventually being signed by the club.

=== Nordsjælland ===
On 16 October 2009, he signed a one-year contract with the Danish club FC Nordsjælland. On 8 November 2009, Zuma scored his first goal for Nordsjælland in the club's 1–0 win over SønderjyskE. When Nordsjælland visited F.C. Copenhagen on 24 March 2010 in a Danish League match, Zuma played well and was substituted to a large majority of the F.C. Copenhagen supporters applauding him. A distinctly touched Zuma claimed that the home supporters were incredible.

=== Vasco da Gama ===
In 2010, Zuma joined Vasco da Gama, based in Cape Town. He played one season for the club.

=== SuperSport United ===
In 2011, Zuma joined SuperSport United, where he stayed until announcing his retirement in 2015.

== International career ==
He has represented South Africa 67 times. He played for his country at the 2002 FIFA World Cup. Zuma was the captain of South African National team at the 2006 African Cup of Nations tournament.

== Personal life ==
=== Sibusiso Zuma Foundation ===
In 2010, Zuma opened the Sibusiso Zuma Foundation which works with young kids with HIV. The foundation also works with "prevention and education about HIV/Aids" and "the prevention of HIV infection and/or the distribution of information relating to HIV/Aids".

=== Nickname ===
He is also known as "Zuma the Puma" to the Copenhagen supporters and "Puma" appears on his shirt instead of "Zuma" in the PES 2009 video game.

=== Incident ===
On 25 June 2007, it was reported that Zuma had been involved in an incident in his home country South Africa. After an altercation there were allegations that he threatened to shoot a group of men at a party in Kokstad. The local police investigated the situation, and Zuma was prevented from leaving the country for a period, but no charges were made.

=== Family ===
Zuma told in the 2002 documentary "Zuma the Puma" that his father was never very supportive of his footballing career, never believing in him, telling him he would never be good enough, never coming to his games and always working instead. When Zuma moved to the Orlando Pirates in 1998, his father told him "The good players play on the national team." Zuma's father died the day before his son played his first game for the South Africa national team.

== Career statistics ==
Scores and results list South Africa's goal tally first, score column indicates score after each Zuma goal.

List of international goals scored by Sibusiso Zuma
No.	Date	Venue	Opponent	Score	Result	Competition
1	24 March 2001	Boet Erasmus Stadium, Port Elizabeth, South Africa	Mauritius	3–0	3–0	2002 Africa Cup of Nations qualification
2	1 July 2001	4 August Stadium, Ouagadougou, Burkina Faso	Burkina Faso	1–0	1–1	2002 FIFA World Cup qualification
3	3 February 2002	Amady Ngaou Stadium, Segou, Mali	Morocco	1–0	3–0	2002 Africa Cup of Nations
4	3 September 2005	4 August Stadium, Ouagadougou, Burkina Faso	Burkina Faso	1–3	1–3	2006 FIFA World Cup qualification
5	8 October 2005	Kings Park Stadium, Durban, South Africa	DR Congo	1–0	2–2	2006 FIFA World Cup qualification
6	8 October 2005	Kings Park Stadium, Durban, South Africa	DR Congo	2–2	2–2	2006 FIFA World Cup qualification
7	12 November 2005	Boet Erasmus Stadium, Port Elizabeth, South Africa	Senegal	1–1	2–3	Friendly
8	24 March 2007	Stade Omnisports Idriss Mahamat Ouya, Ndjamena, Chad	Chad	3–0	3–0	2008 Africa Cup of Nations qualification
9	2 June 2007	Kings Park Stadium, Durban, South Africa	Chad	2–0	4–0	2008 Africa Cup of Nations qualification
10	2 June 2007	Kings Park Stadium, Durban, South Africa	Chad	3–0	4–0	2008 Africa Cup of Nations qualification
11	17 June 2007	Stade Municipal, Pointe-Noire, Congo	Congo	1–0	1–1	2008 Africa Cup of Nations qualification
12	13 January 2008	Chatsworth Stadium, Durban, South Africa	Mozambique	1–0	2–0	Friendly
13	16 January 2008	King Zwelithini Stadium, Durban, South Africa	Botswana	2–1	2–1	Friendly

== Honours ==
F.C. Copenhagen

- Danish Superliga: 2000–01, 2002–03
- Danish Super Cup: 2001

FC Nordsjælland

- Danish Cup: 2009–10
