= Saidi Ndikumana =

Burundian footballer

Personal information
- Date of birth: May 24, 1986 (age 40)
- Place of birth: Bujumbura, Burundi
- Position: Defender

Team information
- Current team: AS Rangers

Senior career*
Years	Team	Apps	(Gls)
2004–	AS Rangers		

International career^{‡}
2003–2007	Burundi	5	(2)
- * Club domestic league appearances and goals as of 9 November 2007 ‡ National team caps and goals as of 9 November 2007

Saidi Ndikumana (born 24 May 1986 in Bujumbura) is a Burundian defender who played with AS Rangers in the Burundi Second Division.

== International career ==
=== International goals ===
Scores and results list Burundi's goal tally first.

No.	Date	Venue	Opponent	Score	Result	Competition
1.	8 October 2006	Prince Louis Rwagasore Stadium, Bujumbura, Burundi	Mauritania	1–0	3–1	2008 Africa Cup of Nations qualification
2.	8 October 2006	Prince Louis Rwagasore Stadium, Bujumbura, Burundi	Mauritania	2–0	3–1	2008 Africa Cup of Nations qualification
