= Toussaint Mayembi =

Republic of the Congo footballer

Toussaint Mayimbi is a footballer from the Republic of Congo who plays for Diables Noirs. A member of the Republic of Congo national football team, Mayimbi scored 1 goal in the 2008 African Cup of Nations qualifying tournament, against Chad.
