= Mousa El Tayeb =

Sudanese footballer

Musa Eltayeb
Personal information
- Full name: Musa Eltayeb Elnour
- Date of birth: June 15, 1984 (age 42)
- Place of birth: Sudan
- Height: 1.92 m (6 ft 3 1/2 in)
- Position: Left back

Team information
- Current team: Al-Zoma SC (Khartoum)
- Number: 3

Senior career*
Years	Team	Apps	(Gls)
2005	Al-Zoma SC (Khartoum)		
2006-2014	Al-Merrikh SC		
2014-2015	Al Ahli SC (Khartoum)		
2016	Al-Nil SC (Shendi)		
2017	Al Ahli SC (Khartoum)		
2018	Hay Al-Arab SC		
2018-2020	Al-Mourada SC		
2020-2024	Al-Zoma SC (Khartoum)		
2024-	Al Rabita Kosti		

International career
2006-2012	Sudan	38	(1)
Medal record
Representing Sudan
CECAFA Cup
Winner	2006 Ethiopia
- * Club domestic league appearances and goals

Musa El Tayeb (known as Musa El Zoma) is a Sudanese footballer who currently plays for El-Merreikh. He is a member of the Sudan National Football Team. He plays as left back.

He was born on 15 June 1984.

== International goals ==
#	Date	Venue	Opponent	Score	Result	Competition
1.	9 September 2007	Khartoum, Sudan	Tunisia	3-2	Won	2008 Africa Cup of Nations qualification

== Honours ==
Sudan

- CECAFA Cup: 2006
