= Stade Lavallois =

French football club in Laval

- Full name: Stade Lavallois Mayenne; Football Club
- Nickname: Les Tango
- Founded: 17 July 1902; 124 years ago
- Stadium: Stade Francis Le Basser
- Capacity: 11,107
- President: Laurent Lairy
- Head coach: David Vignes
- League: Ligue 2
- 2025–26: Ligue 2, 16th of 18
- Website: www.stade-lavallois.com
Home colours	Away colours

Stade Lavallois Mayenne Football Club (French: Stade lavallois Mayenne Football Club; French pronunciation: [stɑd lavalwa majɛn]), also referred to as Stade Lavallois or simply Laval, (Note: Stade Laval, used by some English-speaking media outlets and journalists, is not a grammatically correct name for the club.) is a French association football club based in Laval in western France. The club was formed on 17 July 1902 and currently plays in Ligue 2, the second level of French football. Laval plays its home matches at the Stade Francis Le Basser located in the city.

== History ==
The club was founded in 1902 by Joseph Gemain, a passionate supporter of the sport of football. Émile Sinoir was installed as the club's first president. At that time, players were supplied with red tops and black shorts and matches were played at Senelle, a district of Laval. Laval's first official match was against nearby Rennes. In 1903, the club participated in the Breton championship for the first time, and the red and black strip was changed for a green and white combination. In September 1923, the kit colour was changed again, to a bright orange strip. In 1930, the club began playing at the Stade Jean Yvinec, named in honour of a former player who died at the age of 26. By 1931, Laval had risen to the Division d'Honneur, the sixth level of French football. The club continued to rotate between the amateur leagues before finally winning the Division d'Honneur in 1964, which propelled the club to the Championnat de France amateur, France's highest division of amateur football.

The following season, Laval surprisingly won the league in its debut season. With the club heightening its ambitions, new aspirations came about and Laval named former club player and Breton Michel Le Milinaire manager. The president was Henri Bisson. Together, the two made Laval into one of the best clubs in France. In 1976, Laval reached the top division of French football, thus becoming a professional team for the first time in the club's history. Despite being classed as outsiders, the club managed to stay in the top-flight division, even qualifying for the UEFA Cup in 1983 after finishing a commendable fifth in the league. In Laval's first season in Europe, it knocked Dynamo Kyiv out of the competition, before being knocked out by Austria Wien. This would prove to be the club's only European experience. In 1989, the club was relegated to the second division, after 13 years in the elite division. In 2005, Laval became a SASP (Société Anonyme Sportive Professionnelle), roughly equivalent to going on the stock exchange. In the 2005–06 season, the club was relegated to the Championnat National. Laval remained in the third division for two seasons before managing promotion back to Ligue 2 after the 2008–09 season.

In the 2021–22 season, Laval achieved promotion to Ligue 2 by winning the Championnat National.

== Honours ==
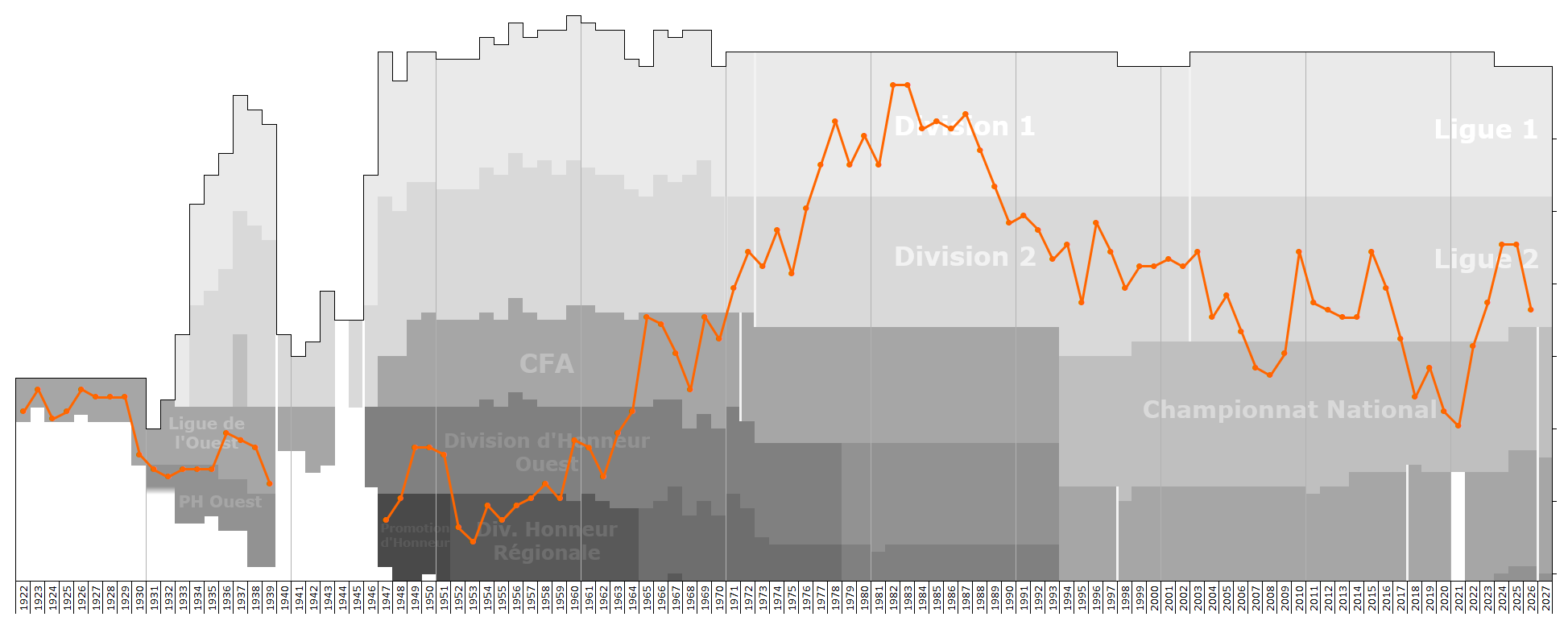
Historical league performance chart of Stade Lavallois FC

- Championnat National:

- Champions (1): 2021–22

- Division d'Honneur (West):

- Champions (1): 1963–64

- Coupe Gambardella:

- Champions (1): 1983–84

- Coupe de la Ligue:

- Winners (2): 1982, 1984

== Current squad ==
As of 7 September 2026.

Note: Flags indicate national team as defined under FIFA eligibility rules; some limited exceptions apply. Players may hold more than one non-FIFA nationality.

No.	Pos.	Nation	Player
1	GK	FRA	Maxime Hautbois
3	DF	FRA	William Bianda
5	MF	FRA	Julien Maggiotti
6	MF	FRA	Sam Sanna
7	MF	FRA	Chafik Gourichy
8	MF	FRA	Teddy Bouriaud
11	FW	FRA	Trévis Dago
12	DF	FRA	Mattéo Commaret
13	MF	FRA	Francis Coquelin
14	MF	MTQ	Cyril Mandouki
17	FW	FRA	Corentin Fatou
18	DF	SEN	Aboubacar Lô
20	MF	FRA	Ethan Clavreul

No.	Pos.	Nation	Player
21	MF	FRA	Alessio Beaudouin
22	DF	FRA	Jules Gaudin
23	DF	FRA	Esteban Mouton
24	DF	SEN	Sidi Bane
26	MF	FRA	Hermann Esmel
27	MF	FRA	Alpha Diallo
28	FW	GAM	Aboubakary Kanté
29	DF	GUI	Mamadou Sidibé
30	GK	MLI	Mamadou Samassa
31	FW	FRA	Mathys Houdayer
32	MF	FRA	Yanis Court
35	DF	SEN	Layousse Samb

=== Out on loan ===
Note: Flags indicate national team as defined under FIFA eligibility rules; some limited exceptions apply. Players may hold more than one non-FIFA nationality.

No. / Pos. / Nation / Player; — / MF / POR / Loïs Martins (at Avranches until 30 June 2027)	No. / Pos. / Nation / Player; — / MF / FRA / Enzo Montet (at Thionville until 30 June 2027)

=== Notable players ===
Below are the notable former players who have represented Laval in league and international competition since the club's foundation in 1902.

For a complete list of Stade Laval players, see Category:Stade Lavallois players.

- (France) Anthony Losilla
- (Cameroon) Christian Bekamenga
- (France) Claude Le Roy
- (Mali) Djimi Traoré
- (Germany) Erwin Kostedde
- (Ivory Coast) Eugène Dadi
- (Tunisia) Fahid Ben Khalfallah
- (France) Francis Coquelin
- (France) Franck Haise
- (Cameroon) François Omam-Biyik
- (France) Frank Leboeuf
- (Ivory Coast) François Zoko
- (Algeria) Hassan Yebda
- (Morocco) Hugo Boumous
- (France) Jean-Luc Dogon
- (France) Jean-Marc Furlan
- (France) Jean-Pierre Tempet
- (France) Jérôme Leroy
- (France) Lilian Nalis
- (France) Lionel Pérez
- (Algeria) Mehdi Boudjemaa
- (Algeria) Mehdi Lacen
- (France) Mickaël Madar
- (France) Nicolas Pallois
- (France) Nordi Mukiele
- (France) Oumar Solet
- (France) Ousmane Dabo
- (France) Patrice Carteron
- (France) Patrick Delamontagne
- (Gabon) Pierre-Emerick Aubameyang
- (France) Raymond Keruzoré
- (France) Régis Le Bris
- (France) Romain Hamouma
- (Guinea) Serhou Guirassy
- (Germany) Uwe Krause
- (France) Wesley Saïd
- (Democratic Republic of the Congo) Yoane Wissa
- (Cameroon) Yvan Neyou

== Coaching staff ==
Position	Staff
Manager	(France) Olivier Frapolli
Assistant managers	(France) Gilles Bourges
Assistant managers	(France) Francis De Percin
Goalkeeper coach	(France) Anthony Corre
Fitness coaches	(France) Sébastien Sergent
Fitness coaches	(France) Antoine Roussel
Data analyst	(France) Maxime Robin
Video analyst	(France) Maxime Muhieddine
Physiotherapists	(Portugal) Ruben Pacheco
Physiotherapists	(France) Clément Blin
Intendant	(France) Patrick Essandi

== Managers ==
- Antoine Raab (1949–50)
- André Sorel (1954–58)
- Robert Heuillard (1958–63)
- Jean Barré (1963–68)
- Michel Le Millinaire (1968–Oct 92)
- Bernard Maligorne (Oct 1992–95)
- Denis Troch (Jan 1995–97)
- Hervé Gauthier (1997–2001)
- Victor Zvunka (2001–03)
- Francis Smerecki (2003–Jan 4)
- Alex Dupont (Jan 2004–June 4)
- Denis Troch (2004–07)
- Philippe Hinschberger (2007–14)
- Denis Zanko (2014–2016)
- Marco Simone (2016–2017)
- Thierry Goudet 2017
- Jean-Marc Nobilo 2017
- Manuel Pires (caretaker) (2017–2018)
- François Ciccolini (2018–2019)
- Pascal Braud (caretaker) (2019)
- Olivier Frapolli (2019–present)
