= Ethan Clavreul =

French footballer (born 2006)

Personal information
- Date of birth: 29 June 2006 (age 20)
- Place of birth: Laval, France
- Height: 1.81 m (5 ft 11 in)
- Position: Attacking midfielder

Team information
- Current team: Laval
- Number: 20

Youth career
- 2015–2025: Laval

Senior career*
Years	Team	Apps	(Gls)
2024–	Laval B	21	(7)
2025–	Laval	26	(5)
- * Club domestic league appearances and goals as of 12 May 2026

Ethan Clavreul (born 29 June 2006) is a French professional footballer who plays as an attacking midfielder for Ligue 2 club Laval.

== Early life ==
Clavreul was born in Laval and grew up in Courbeveille. He began his football career at Stade Lavallois, where he joined at the age of nine.

== Club career ==
After good performances with Laval's reserves team, Clavreul integrated Laval's first team for the pre-season friendlies and training camp ahead of the 2025–26 season. On 10 August 2025, Clavreul made his first appearance for Laval, coming in as a substitute in a Ligue 2 game against Saint-Étienne, and scored the equalizer goal in the 87th minute as the game ended 3–3. Following his successful debut, on 19 August, Laval offered Clavreul his first professional contract, signing with the team until June 2029. Three weeks after, on 12 September, he scored two goals against Boulogne, granting a 2–1 win for Laval - the team's first victory in the season.
