= FC Mulhouse =

French football club, based in Mulhouse

- Full name: Football Club de Mulhouse
- Founded: 1893; 133 years ago (as FC Mülhausen)
- Ground: Stade de l'Ill, Mulhouse
- Capacity: 7,871
- Manager: Cédric Fauré
- League: Régional (level to be determined)
- 2021–22: National 3 Group M, 8th (relegated administratively)
- Website: https://fcmulhouse.net
Home colours	Away colours

Football Club de Mulhouse (pronounced [myluz]; commonly referred to as FCM or simply Mulhouse) is a French association football club based in Mulhouse. The club was founded in 1893 and currently play in the Championnat National 3, the fifth level of French football. Mulhouse plays its home matches at the Stade de l'Ill located within the city.

Mulhouse was founded under the name Fussball-Club Mülhausen in what was then Mülhausen, Alsace-Lorraine in Germany. The club's location has been dependent on the control of the Alsace region between France and Germany. Mulhouse has played in French football since the re-acquisition of the region after World War II and is the second-oldest football club in France after Le Havre AC. The club has achieved minimal honours in its history having spent most of its existence playing in the amateur divisions of France. However, Mulhouse have spent seven seasons in Ligue 1 and 27 seasons in Ligue 2. The club's highest honour to date in France was winning the Division d'Honneur in 1928. Regionally, Mulhouse has won the Alsace Division d'Honneur seven times. During the club's stint in Germany, it won the Gauliga Elsaß three times.

Mulhouse has served as a springboard for several football players and managers, most notably Arsène Wenger and Raymond Domenech. In the managerial role Wenger is known for his time at English club Arsenal, but prior to that had successful stints at Nancy, AS Monaco, and Nagoya Grampus. Domenech also played for Mulhouse, and he had his first managerial spell there. He later went on to manage the France national team from 2004 to 2010.

== History ==
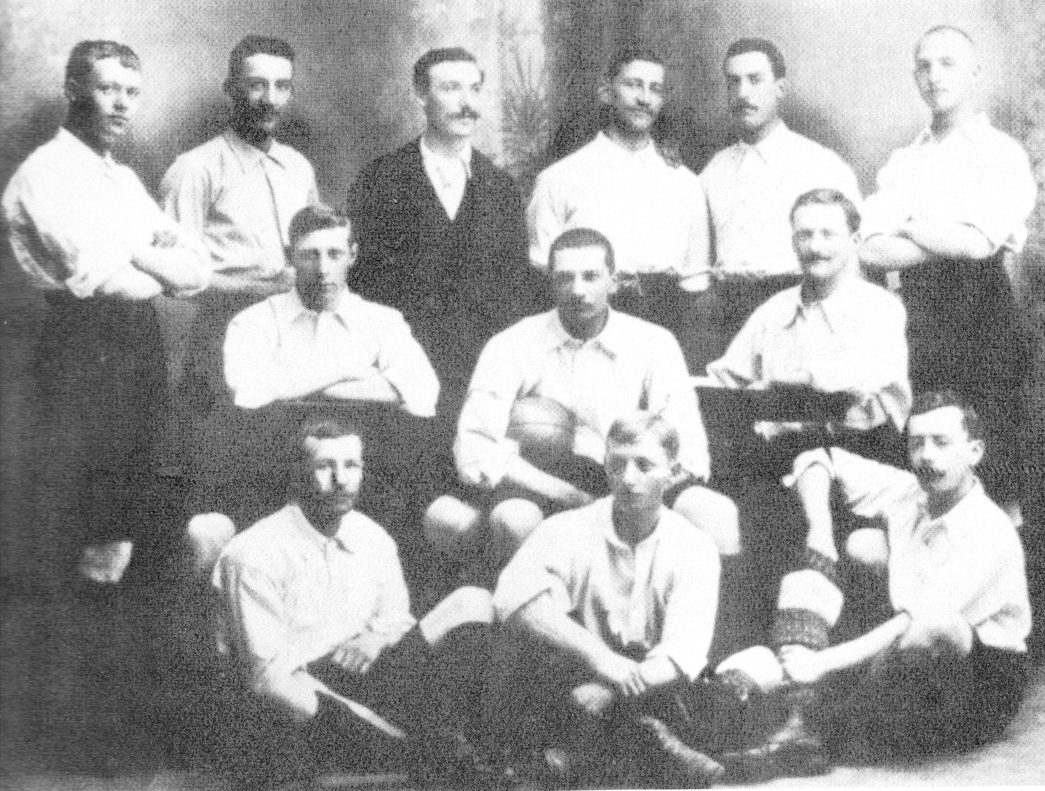

Football Club de Mulhouse was founded in 1893 under the name Fussball Club Mülhausen by two young Englishmen enrolled at the Mulhouse Chemistry School in Mülhausen, Alsace-Lorraine, in Germany. The students introduced the sport to their fellow students, and a club was subsequently formed. In 1901, they were joined by a group of footballers known as the "Young Boys" from the Oberrealschule Gymnasium. The club was a member of the VSFV (German: Verband Süddeutscher Fussball Vereine or Federation of South German Football Clubs) by 1904; it suffered a financial crisis in 1905–06, but survived.

France reclaimed the territory of Alsace from Germany after World War I, and FC Mülhausen became part of the regional top flight Division d'Honneur – Alsace as FC Mulhouse (FCM) where the club captured the division title in 1921 and finished as vice-champions in 1926. FCM then put together a string of five consecutive division titles from 1928 to 1932. The 1932 regional title was parlayed into a win in the Coupe Sochaux, also known as the Challenge Peugeot, one of the predecessors of the national championship competition first staged the following season.

After the re-organization of French football into a national system, FCM played a single season in the First Division/Group A before being relegated. They played their way back to the top flight in 1934 until again being relegated in 1937.

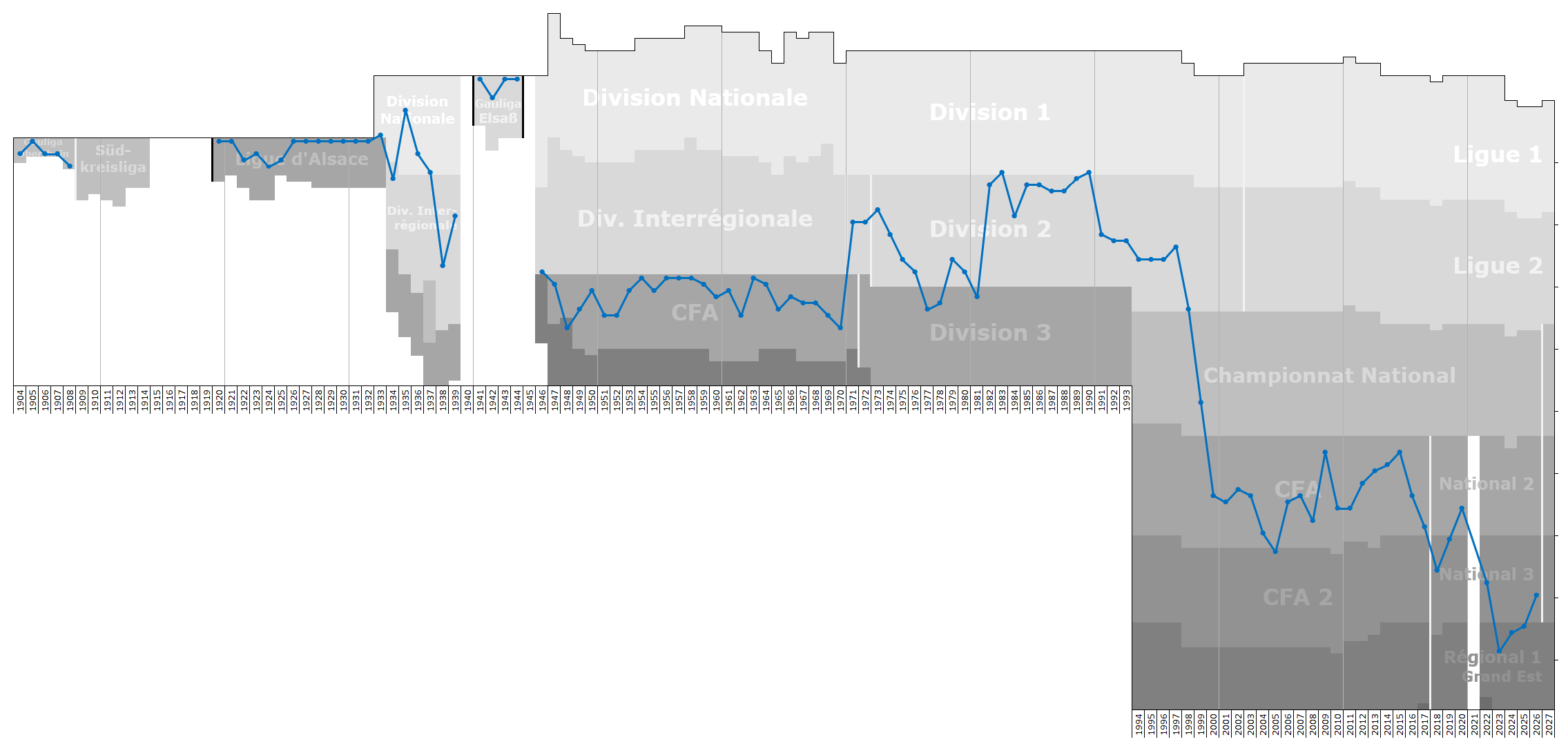
Historical league performance chart of FC Mulhouse

With the onset of World War II and the re-conquest of Alsace by Germany, FCM returned to that country's football competition in the regional first division Gauliga Elsaß in 1941. They quickly became the dominant side there capturing titles in 1941, 1943, and 1944, but were not able to follow up with any success in the German national championship playoff rounds, being eliminated in the early going on each occasion. Play in the Gauliga was suspended part-way through the 1944–45 season as Allied armies advanced into Germany.

Following the war, FCM was once again returned to French football to play a single season in the second division before slipping to amateur level play, where they would remain until 1970. The club struggled through six seasons in the second division over the course of the decade. However, its performance improved in the 1980s, and FCM became a solid second division side, earning single-season turns in the top flight in 1982–83 and 1989–90. Through the early 1990s the club played as FC Mulhouse Sud-Alsace and continued to play second-tier football until relegated in 1998. A financial crisis followed and the club was bankrupted in 1999; it re-organised as an amateur side the following season. In 2005 the club was promoted from the CFA 2 (V) to the third division CFA (Championnat de France), the country's highest class.

In January 2017, the club was bought by American businessman Gary Allen, who saved the club from an immediate threat of bankruptcy by investing 150,000 euros. Ambitious goals to were set, to see the club rise to Ligue 2 in the medium term.

In 2020, the club was administratively relegated from Championnat National 2 due to financial issues, despite finishing 12th in its group. On 12 July 2022, the Grand Est league announced that Mulhouse were to be relegated to Régional 1 for financial reasons, subject to appeal. Four days later, Gary Allen resigned as president of the club, quoting personal reasons. On 21 July 2022, the club was placed into receivership by the courts in Mulhouse, with debts reported to amount to 500,000 euros.

== Stadium ==
Since 1979, FC Mulhouse has played its home games at the Stade de l'Ill. Between 1906 and the end of World War I the team played in the Stade Vélodrome and, after the war, in the Stade de Bourtzwiller.

== Current squad ==
As of 26 February 2019

Note: Flags indicate national team as defined under FIFA eligibility rules; some limited exceptions apply. Players may hold more than one non-FIFA nationality.

No.	Pos.	Nation	Player
—	GK	SEN	Issa Ndoye
—	GK	FRA	Enzo Bonaso
—	DF	FRA	Dorian Dugon
—	DF	FRA	Samir Kecha
—	DF	SEN	Mouhameth Sané
—	DF	SEN	Assane Diouf
—	DF	FRA	Clément Kowalczuk
—	DF	ESP	Enriq Maureta
—	DF	FRA	Edgar Delbos
—	DF	FRA	Mickaël Claudel
—	MF	FRA	Medhi Bouhabila
—	MF	FRA	Malik M'Tir

No.	Pos.	Nation	Player
—	MF	FRA	Adam Shaiek
—	MF	FRA	Hermann Baka
—	MF	FRA	Imad El Moussaid
—	MF	CMR	Franck Essomba
—	MF	FRA	Nassim Titebah
—	MF	FRA	José Nsongo
—	FW	FRA	Reda Taqtak
—	FW	FRA	Idrissa Soumah
—	FW	FRA	Mahamadou Diawara
—	FW	FRA	Tiago Teixeira
—	FW	HAI	Ashkanov Apollon

== Notable players ==
Had international caps for their respective countries. Players whose name is listed in bold represented their countries while playing for Mulhouse.

France

- Arsène Wenger
- Raymond Domenech
- Jean-Marc Guillou
- Jean-Noël Huck
- Marc Keller
- Lucien Laurent
- Stéphane Paille
- Pierre Pleimelding
- André Rey
- Didier Six
- Yannick Stopyra
- Jean-Pierre Tempet
- Roland Wagner

Argentina

- Néstor Subiat

Algeria

- Malek Aït-Alia
- Salah Assad
- Ali Bouafia

Australia

- Eddie Krncevic

Austria

- Karl Gall
- Franz Weselik

Belgium

- Dominique Lemoine

Benin

- Daniel Gbaguidi

Bulgaria

- Georgi Georgiev
- Borislav Mihaylov

Chile

- Jorge Infante

Congo

- Jean-Vivien Bantsimba

Congo DR

- Zico Tumba

Denmark

- John Eriksen

Gabon

- Guy Roger Nzamba
- Landry Poulangoye

Germany

- Manfred Kaltz
- Willibald Kreß

Ghana

- Abédi Pelé

Guinea

- Bobo Baldé
- Morlaye Cissé

Luxembourg

- Edy Dublin

Morocco

- Gharib Amzine
- Mourad Bounoua

Netherlands

- Kees Kist

Norway

- Terje Kojedal
- Arve Seland

Switzerland

- Nestor Subiat

Togo

- Tagba Mini Balogou

Yugoslavia

- Zoran Bojović
- Saša Kovačević
- Blaž Slišković
- Nenad Stojković

== Coaches ==
- Ferdinand Swatosch :1932–1933
- Franz Platko:1933
- Rudolf Hanak :1933–1934
- Franz Weselik :1934–1935
- Fritz Kerr :1935–1936
- Emile Grienenberger :1939–1945
- Josef Remay :1945–1946
- Lucien Perpère :1945–1946
- Aimé Nuic :1951–1952
- Mohammed Azzouz :1952–1954
- Pierre Ranzoni :1954–1955
- Georges Boulogne :1955
- Albertus De Harder :1962–1964
- Lucien Mille :1964–1965
- Marian Borkowski :1966–1967
- Léon Deladerrière :1967–1973
- Pierre Alonso :1973–1974
- Marcel Schloetter :1974–1976
- Roland Merschel :1976–1980
- Eugène Battmann : 1980–1981
- Jean-Marc Guillou :1981–1982
- Eugène Battmann : 1982–1983
- Gérard Banide :1983–1984
- Raymond Domenech :1984–1988
- Didier Notheaux :1988–1990
- Robert Dewilder :1990–1992
- Bernard Genghini :1992–1995
- Christian Sarramagna :1995 – November 1996
- Gilles Bourges: November 1996 – April 1998
- Lamine N'Diaye : April–December 1998
- Eugène Battmann : December 1998 – 1999
- Bruno Scipion : 1999–2001
- Damien Ott : 2001–2002
- Jacky Lemée : 2002–2003
- Jean-Paul Pfertzel : 2003
- Maurice Danelon : 2003–2004
- Damien Ott : 2004–2008
- Albert Falette :2008–2010
- Laurent Croci :2010–2013
- Gharib Amzine :2013–2015
- Hakim Aibeche : 2015–2016
- Franck Priou :2016 - January 2017
- Noël Tosi : January 2017 – June 2017
- Carlos Inarejos : June 2017–2018
- Eric Descombes : 2018
