= Jean-Pierre Tempet =

French footballer (born 1954)

Personal information
- Full name: Jean-Pierre Tempet
- Date of birth: 31 December 1954 (age 71)
- Place of birth: Humbercourt, France
- Position: Goalkeeper

Senior career*
Years	Team	Apps	(Gls)
1970–1978	Lens	62	(0)
1978–1983	Laval		
1983–1984	Lens	34	(0)
1984–1987	FC Mulhouse		
1987–1990	Valenciennes		

International career
1982–1983	France	5	(0)
- * Club domestic league appearances and goals

Jean-Pierre Tempet (French: [ʒɑ̃ pjɛʁ tɑ̃pɛ]; born 31 December 1954) is a French former football goalkeeper.
