= Alex Brown (Liberian footballer) =

Liberian footballer

Personal information
- Date of birth: 16 April 1978 (age 48)
- Position: Midfielder

Senior career*
Years	Team	Apps	(Gls)
1996–1998	FC Luzern		
1998–1999	FC Sion		

International career
1999–2001	Liberia	20	(1)
- * Club domestic league appearances and goals

Alex Brown (born 16 April 1978) is a Liberian former professional footballer who played as a midfielder. He played 20 matches for the Liberia national team from 1999 to 2001, scoring once. He was also named in Liberia's squad for the 2002 African Cup of Nations tournament.
