= Abdoulie Corr =

Gambian footballer

Personal information
- Full name: Abdoulie Paco Corr
- Date of birth: 9 June 1982 (age 44)
- Place of birth: Banjul, Gambia
- Height: 1.84 m (6 ft 1/2 in)
- Positions: Defender; midfielder

Team information
- Current team: Närpes Kraft

Senior career*
Years	Team	Apps	(Gls)
2002–2006	Banjul Hawks	?	(?)
2006–2010	KPV	81	(1)
2010–2011	PoPa	4	(0)
2011	VPS	2	(0)
2011–	Närpes Kraft	2	(0)

International career
2002–2007	Gambia	8	(0)
- * Club domestic league appearances and goals as of 23:50, 18 March 2012 (UTC)

Abdoulie Paco Corr (born 9 June 1982) is a Gambian footballer who has played for Banjul Hawks, KPV, PoPa, VPS and Närpes Kraft. He has been capped at international level by the Gambia national team.
