= Jean-Vivien Bantsimba =

French-Congolese footballer (born 1982)

Personal information
- Date of birth: 1 September 1982 (age 44)
- Place of birth: Paris, France
- Height: 1.72 m (5 ft 8 in)
- Position: Midfielder

Team information
- Current team: FC Mulhouse

Senior career*
| Years | Team | Apps | (Gls) |
| 2002–2003 | Amiens SC | 3 | (0) |
| 2003–2005 | US Boulogne | 44 | (0) |
| 2005–2007 | Pau FC | 31 | (0) |
| 2007–2008 | US Raon-l'Etape | 22 | (3) |
| 2008– | FC Mulhouse | 22 | (2) |

International career
| 2005– | Republic of the Congo | 2 | (0) |
- * Club domestic league appearances and goals as of 05:52, 1 December 2007 (UTC)

Jean-Vivien Bantsimba (born 1 September 1982) is a French-Congolese football player. Currently, he plays in the Championnat de France amateur for FC Mulhouse.
