= Assan Jatta =

Gambian footballer

Personal information
- Full name: Assan Jatta
- Date of birth: 26 June 1984 (age 42)
- Place of birth: Gambia
- Position: Striker

Senior career*
| Years | Team | Apps | (Gls) |
| 2005–2006 | Steve Biko | | |
| 2006–2009 | Lierse S.K. | | |
| 2007–2008 | → Verbroedering Geel-Meerhout (loan) | | |
| 2010 | Ron Mango FC | | |
| 2011 | Mariekerke | 7 | (2) |
| 2011– | Steve Biko | | |

International career
| | Gambia | 2 | |
- * Club domestic league appearances and goals

Assan Jatta (born 26 June 1984) is a Gambian football striker. He currently plays for Steve Biko FC in Gambia. He scored twice in seven league appearances in a Mariekerke shirt since switching to the club from local side Steve Biko in the opening stage of the Belgian third tier campaign in 2011, , and has been on the national team of Gambia. In July and August 2008 he joined FC Dallas on a 10-day trial. In July 2009 he joined Columbus Crew SC on trial, but was not signed.

Jatta previously played for Lierse in the Belgian First Division.

In the 2005–2006 season he played in Gambia for club Steve Biko, and then joined Lierse S.K. In Belgian First Division, he was loaned out to Verbroedering Geel-Meerhout. In 2010, he went back home in Gambia to play for Ron Mango FC. He has played twice for the national side.
