= Victor Helu =

Namibian footballer (1983–2009)

Personal information
- Date of birth: 6 April 1983
- Date of death: 18 December 2009 (aged 26)
- Place of death: Windhoek, Namibia
- Position: Midfielder

Senior career*
Years	Team	Apps	(Gls)
2002–2007	Ramblers		
2004–2005	→ United Africa Tigers		
2007–2009	Civics		
2009	Eleven Arrows		

International career
2002–2008	Namibia	14	(1)
- * Club domestic league appearances and goals

Victor Helu (6 April 1983 – 18 December 2009) was a Namibian footballer who played as a midfielder in the Namibia Premier League and for the Namibia national team. Helu was stabbed to death in Windhoek on 18 December 2009.

Helu was one of Namibia's most respected and experienced soccer players. He started his career Premier League career with Ramblers in 2002, before joining Civics Windhoek in 2007. He made his debut for the Namibia national team in 2002 against Botswana and went on to win 15 caps for his country. His last appearance for the Brave Warriors came in March 2008 against Malawi.
