= Ahmed Al Masli =

Libyan footballer (born 1979)

Ahmed Al Masli أَحْمَد الْمَصْلِيّ
Personal information
- Full name: Ahmed Faraj Hussein Al Masli
- Date of birth: December 28, 1979 (age 46)
- Place of birth: Benghazi, Libya
- Height: 1.79 m (5 ft 10 1/2 in)
- Position: Striker

Youth career
- 1993–2000: Tahaddy

Senior career*
Years	Team	Apps	(Gls)
1998–2001	Tahaddy		(??)
2004–2006	Ittihad Tripoli	32	(16)
2006–2007	Nasr Benghazi	22	(14)
2007–2008	Ittihad Tripoli	9	(7)
2008	Arabi	2	(2)
2008	Ahly Benghazi	40	(11)
2009	Stade Tunisien		
2009–2010	Hilal		
2011–2012	El-Entag El-Harby		
2012–2013	Club Athlétique Bizertin		
2013–2014	Tersana SC		

International career
1998–2008	Libya	33	(17)
- * Club domestic league appearances and goals as of January 27, 2007

Ahmed Faraj Hussein Al Masli (Arabic: أَحْمَد فَرَج حُسَيْن الْمَصْلِيّ) (born March 4, 1979) was a Libyan international footballer. He was also a member of the Libyan national team.

== Career ==
By scoring against Al Hilal on November 21, 2008, al-Masli has now scored against every team in the Libyan Premier League. He is the only player ever to do so.

After an impressive couple of seasons with Ahly Benghazi (2008–10), it was announced that the Egyptian Premier League side El-Entag El-Harby had signed the striker on a two-year deal.

On December 27, 2011, the Tunisian Ligue Professionnelle 1 side Club Athlétique Bizertin had signed the striker on a one year and al half deal.
