= Khaled Hussein =

Libyan footballer (born 1977)

Personal information
- Full name: Khaled Hussein Mohamed al Tarhouni
- Date of birth: 24 February 1977 (age 49)
- Place of birth: Benghazi, Libya
- Position: Midfielder

Senior career*
Years	Team	Apps	(Gls)
1996–2012	Al-Nasr SC (Benghazi)		

International career
1999–2010	Libya	23	(1)
- * Club domestic league appearances and goals as of 29 December 2012

Khaled Hussein Mohamed al Tarhouni (born 24 February 1977) is a Libyan football midfielder. As of the 2009–10 season, he plays for the Libyan Premier League club Nasr Benghazi. He is the captain of Nasr and has played in the first team for over 10 years.

== Early years ==
Hussein was born on February 24, 1977, in Benghazi. In 1988, at the age of 10, he joined the club he grew up supporting as a boy in 1988. Since then, he has advanced through the ranks, playing the youth, reserve, and eventually first, teams.

In the 1995–96 season, Hussein helped the reserve team to the Reserve Premier League title, his first major achievement as a player.

== First team ==
In the next season, he debuted for the first team in its match against Al Suqoor at the age of 19. Initially deployed as a playmaker, Hussein gradually grew in importance to the team. He is a goalscoring midfielder as well, having scored over 60 goals in national competitions. He scored his first goal for the club in his debut season, in a 3–0 victory against Afriqi. He helped his side to their Libyan Cup victory in 1997.

== International career ==
After his performance in the first season, Hussein was selected for the squad that was to play at the 1998 Arab Nations Cup in Qatar. He emerged as an important player for the national team after that, and scored his first international goal against Kenya on January 19, 2004. Hussein has made 11 appearances in FIFA World Cup qualifying matches.

Hussein was an important part of the national team. Many managers, such as Mahmoud Al-Sharif, Yousef Sidqi and the Tunisian Munsaf Arfaoui, built their teams around him and Tarik El Taib, and were committed to selecting him for the squad.

== Loyalty ==
Hussein has received many offers to join various clubs both inside and outside Libya, but has refused them to remain with his boyhood club.

== Trophies Won ==
Al Nasr Benghazi

- Libyan Premier League
  - Runner-Up 2002-03
- Libyan Cup
  - Winner 1997, 2003, 2010
- Libyan Super Cup
  - Runner-up (3): 1997, 2003, 2010
- Libyan Reserve Premier League
  - Winner 1996-97
