= Jean Natal Ratsimialona =

Malagasy footballer

Jean Ratsimialona
Personal information
- Full name: Jean Natal Ratsimialona
- Date of birth: May 23, 1978 (age 48)
- Place of birth: Madagascar
- Position: Midfielder

Team information
- Current team: AS Adema

Senior career*
Years	Team	Apps	(Gls)
2002–2004	AS Fortior		
2005–	AS Adema		

International career
2000–2003	Madagascar	16	(2)
- * Club domestic league appearances and goals

Jean Natal Ratsimialona (born May 23, 1978) is a Malagasy footballer currently plays for AS Adema.
