= Gilles Bourges =

French footballer (born 1963

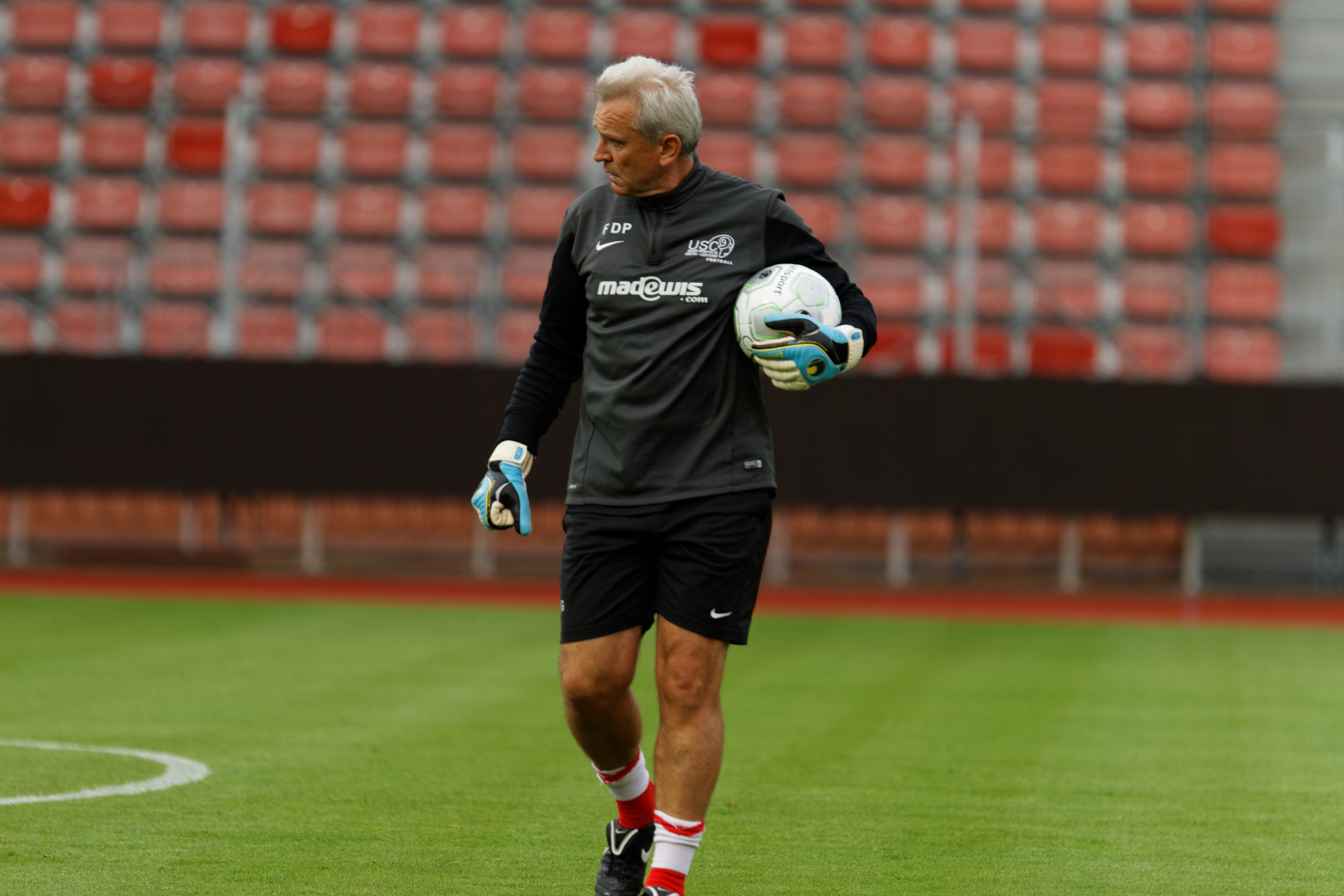

Personal information
- Date of birth: 21 May 1963 (age 63)
- Place of birth: France
- Position: Goalkeeper

Senior career*
Years	Team	Apps	(Gls)
1983–1988	Stade Rennais FC	31	(0)
1988–1991	AC Avignonnais	96	(0)
1991–1992	Olympique Alès	46	(14)
1992–1994	Red Star FC	78	(0)
1994–1995	FC Mulhouse	43	(0)
- * Club domestic league appearances and goals

Gilles Bourges (born 21 May 1963) is a French former footballer who last played as a goalkeeper for FC Mulhouse.

== Early life ==
Bourges is a native of Brittany, France.

== Playing career ==
Bourges started his career in Saint-Brieuc, France.

== Managerial career ==
After retiring from professional football, Bourges established a goalkeeper academy in Morocco. He then worked as a goalkeeper coach and set-piece coach.

== Personal life ==
Bourges is married and has a daughter and a son.
