= Ricardo Naboth =

Mauritian footballer

Personal information
- Full name: Ricardo Naboth
- Date of birth: February 13, 1978 (age 48)
- Place of birth: Mauritius
- Position: Forward

Team information
- Current team: AS Case Créole

Senior career*
Years	Team	Apps	(Gls)
2001–2003	SS Jeanne d'Arc	-	(-)
2004	FC Les Avirons	-	(-)
2005–2007	US Possession	-	(-)
2007–2010	AS Possession	-	(-)
2010	AS Excelsior	-	(-)
2010–	AS Case Créole	-	(-)

International career
2001–2010	Mauritius	21	(3)
- * Club domestic league appearances and goals

Ricardo Naboth (born February 13, 1978, in Mauritius) is a football player who currently plays for AS Case Créole in Réunion and for the Mauritius national football team as a forward. He is featured on the Mauritian national team in the official 2010 FIFA World Cup video game.
