= Michael Pienaar =

Namibian footballer

Elias Michael Pienaar (born 10 January 1978) is a Namibian footballer for Carara Kicks in the South African National First Division.

== Career ==
He previously played for Ramblers F.C. in his home country.

Currently playing for FNB Orlando Pirates in the Namibian Premier League.

== International career ==
Pienaar plays with the Namibia national football team. He also captained Namibia at the 2008 Africa Cup of Nations.
